= Charles Old Goodford =

British headmaster (1812–1884)

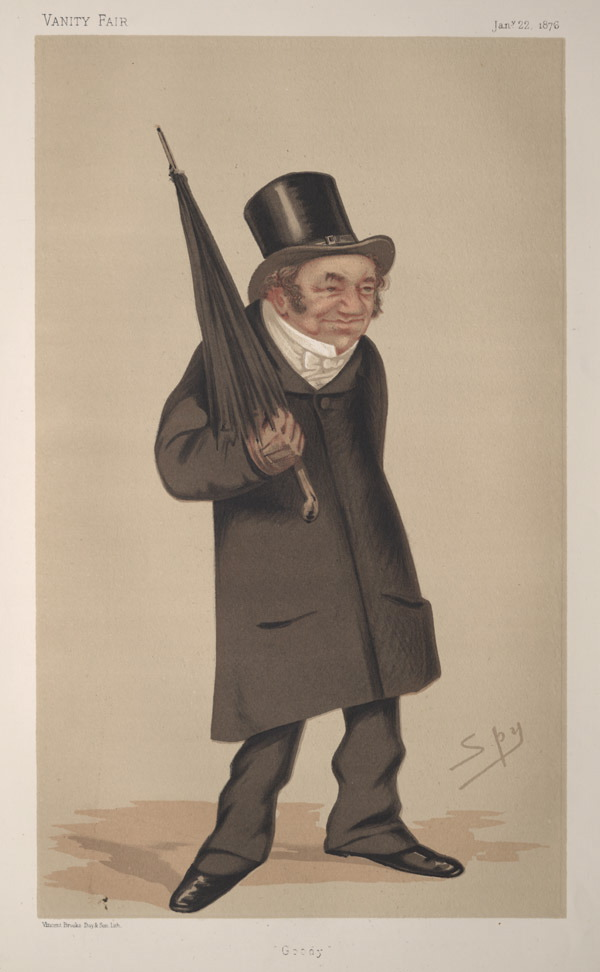
"Goody". Caricature by Spy published in Vanity Fair in 1876.

Charles Old Goodford (15 July 1812, in Chilton-Cantelo – 9 May 1884, in Eton) was an English headmaster, and provost of Eton College.

Goodford was the second son of John Goodford of Chilton Cantelo, Somerset, who died in 1835, by Charlotte, fourth daughter of Montague Cholmeley of Easton, Lincolnshire. He entered Eton in 1826, and proceeded to King's College, Cambridge in 1830, from where he took his B.A. 1836, M.A. 1839, and D.D. 1853.

He was elected a Fellow of King's, but did not long retain his fellowship, as on 28 March 1844 he married Katharine Lucia, third daughter of George Law of Lincoln's Inn. While still an undergraduate he returned to Eton and became an assistant master in 1835. Soon he succeeded his former tutor, John Wilder, as the housemaster of a large house, in which a number of the resident boys were from his own and the adjacent counties. As a housemaster he was liberal and kind, but his management was not equal to his good intentions. In 1853 he succeeded Edward Hawtrey as headmaster at Eton. His rule on the whole was beneficial to the college. He aimed at a very complete reconstruction of the system of teaching; he made discipline a reality, while he abolished many vexatious rules which had needlessly restricted liberty and would have done more but for the veto of the Provost, Dr Hawtrey. In 1854 he edited P. Terentii Afri Comœdiæ, a work which he had printed chiefly to present as a leaving book to his sixth-form boys. On the death of Dr Hawtrey, Lord Palmerston, in ignorance of the needs of Eton, and much against Goodford's own wishes, appointed him Provost of Eton, a position which he held from 27 January 1862 until his death. Under the Cambridge University commission of 1860, and more particularly under the Royal Commission of 1865, great changes and improvements were made in the college. Goodford held the small family living of Chilton-Cantelo from 1848 to his death.

From 1848 until his death in 1884 he was the incumbent at the Church of St James, Chilton Cantelo and supervised the restoration of the church by Sir Arthur Blomfield.

He died at the Provost's Lodge, Eton, on 9 May 1884, and was buried in the Eton cemetery on 14 May.

== Notes ==
Academic offices
Preceded by Edward Craven Hawtrey	Head Master of Eton College; 1853–1862	Succeeded by Edward Balston
Preceded by Edward Craven Hawtrey	Provost of Eton; 1862–1884	Succeeded by James John Hornby
