= Gareth Forwood =

British actor (1945–2007)

- Born: Gareth Langton Johns Forwood; 14 October 1945; Marylebone, London, England
- Died: 16 October 2007 (aged 62); London, England
- Education: Ludgrove School; Stowe School; Chilton Cantelo School; Millfield School
- Occupation: Actor
- Years active: 1964–2000
- Spouse: Veronique Lecoq (m. 1973)
- Children: 1
- Parents: Anthony Forwood (father); Glynis Johns (mother)
- Relatives: Mervyn Johns (grandfather)

Gareth Langton Johns Forwood (14 October 1945 – 16 October 2007) was a British actor. Forwood was the only child of actors Glynis Johns and Anthony Forwood. He made his screen debut in 1965 and went on to prosper as a character actor with over 40 credits in film, television and theatre. His career was marked with recurring roles in several large productions, particularly with the British public broadcast network ITV. In his later career, Forwood was typecast in several British television adaptations of classic novels.

== Early life and education ==
Forwood was born on 14 October 1945 in Marylebone, London to British actors Glynis Johns (1923–2024) and Anthony Forwood (1915–1988), who became stars in the postwar era and divorced in 1948 when Forwood was three years old. Forwood's great-great-grandfather, Thomas Friend Brittain Peploe Forwood, was the forefather of the Forwood baronetcy. On his maternal grandmother's side, he became the fifth generation to act on stage.

Forwood lived with both his mother and father. His father lived with actor Dirk Bogarde at Beel House, a Grade II* listed building in Amersham. He attended Ludgrove School in Wokingham. He was later enrolled at Stowe School in 1959, followed by Chilton Cantelo School, and Millfield School in Street.

== Career ==
=== Early career ===
Though his mother attempted to dissuade him from the stage, Forwood would later make his stage debut on 22 December 1964 with her blessing, playing The Prince in Nicholas Stuart Gray's Beauty and the Beast at the Castle Theatre in Farnham; this production lasted little more than a month, closing on 23 January 1965. He followed this with later appearances at the Apollo Theatre in London as Charles Wykeham in Brandon Thomas' Charley's Aunt from 30 August 1971 to 13 February 1972, Bath's Theatre Royal and London's Cambridge Theatre in Marcelle Maurette's Anastasia in October 1976, and the Ashcroft Theatre in London as Jackie Jackson in a Cambridge Theatre Company production of Terence Rattigan's The Deep Blue Sea from 5 July 1977 to 30 July 1977.

Forwood made his professional television debut with the series of one-off plays The Wednesday Play in 1965, in which he appeared three separate times: as Balcar in 1965, Colin in 1966, and Cantfield in 1970. Forwood made a guest appearance in the sitcom The Golden Age in 1967 and made his cinematic debut in Jack Gold's The Bofors Gun the following year. He appeared in the anthology television series Detective (1968), the silent television comedy For Amusement Only (1968) and the anthology period piece The Jazz Age (1968), as John, Second Youth, and Tom Kent-Cumberland respectively. Forwood was given the minor role of Alistair in Guy Hamilton's 1969 war film Battle of Britain.

The same year, he was cast in two separate ITV anthology series: ITV Playhouse and ITV Sunday Night Theatre. In Playhouse, Forwood played Martin Wyld in the episode Public Face (1969) and Carr in the episode Refuge for a Hero (1972); in Sunday Night Theatre, he played Steven Hindle in the episode The Innocent Ceremony (1969), Basil Anthony in the episode Man and Boy (1971), and Desmond in the episode The Piano Player (1972). In the intervening years, Forwood played Rex Gascoigne in Daniel Deronda (1970), Julian Webb in The Main Chance (1970), P.C. Mansell in Doctor at Large (1971), Brian Foxe in Eyeless in Gaza (1971), and Graham in Late Night Theatre (1972). In 1973, Forwood was cast as Doctor Park in ITV Granada's courtroom drama series Crown Court, along with his grandfather, actor Mervyn Johns, who played Arthur Charles Parfitt and Edward Lumsden.

=== Later career ===
By the mid-1970s, Forwood was already an established character actor, with parts in such films as Where Adam Stood (1976) as Mr. Brackley, Birth of the Beatles (1979) as Alden, and Blade on the Feather (1980) as the Doctor. His television credits of this era include playing Everett Wharton on the 1974 BBC television adaptation of Anthony Trollope's eponymous novels The Pallisers, Jonathan Bridges on the nonlinear narrative series The ITV Play, and Doctor Crampton on the final season of ITV's drama series Armchair Thriller in 1980.

The following two decades saw Forwood take on more film roles. He was cast as the Photographer on Aquitania in Christopher Miles' 1981 biographical film Priest of Love, the Secretary in Richard Attenborough's 1982 period biographical film Gandhi, Duke in David S. Ward's 1991 comedy film King Ralph, Ian in Pradip Krishen's 1992 Indian film Electric Moon, and Denis Carradine in Sarah Pia Anderson's 1995 crime drama Prime Suspect: Inner Circles. Forwood's television roles, too, grew more numerous. He played Max in three episodes of ITV's Funny Man alongside Jimmy Jewel and David Schofield in 1981, Wyndham in one episode of the 1982 adaptation of Thomas Flanagan's eponymous novel The Year of the French, Professional Man in one episode of Roy Ward Baker's sitcom Fairly Secret Army starring Geoffrey Palmer in 1984, the Doctor in three episodes of Johnny Speight's BBC television sitcom In Sickness and in Health in 1987, Boris in one episode of Andrew Davies' adaptation of Domini Taylor's eponymous novel Mother Love, and the surgeon in one episode of Simon Langton's 1994 television mini-series adaptation of the eponymous 1978 novel The Cinder Path by Catherine Cookson.

In 1989, Forwood played Derek Preston in the episode Life and Death of Geoff McQueen's police procedural television series The Bill on ITV. Nine years later in 1998, he was recast in the same series, this time as Maurice Petrow in the episode Indiscretion. His final screen role was as Hilary Quentin in Rob Heyland's 2000 series Bomber. In later life, Forwood worked as a guest commentator for the BBC.

== Personal life ==
In 1973, Forwood married French set designer Véronique Lecoq, with whom he had one son, Thomas Forwood, an animator, writer and director based in Paris.

He died on 16 October 2007 aged 62, at his home in London from cancer complications. He was survived by his mother, son and wife.

== Filmography ==
=== Film ===
Year	Title	Role	Notes	Ref(s)
1968	The Bofors Gun	Lt. Packering		
1969	Battle of Britain	Alistair		
1976	Where Adam Stood	Mr. Brackley	TV movie	
1979	Birth of the Beatles	Alden		
1980	Blade on the Feather	Doctor	TV movie	
1981	Priest of Love	Photographer on Aquitania		
1982	Gandhi	Secretary		
1991	King Ralph	Duke		
1992	Electric Moon	Ian		
1995	Prime Suspect: Inner Circles	Denis Carradine	TV movie	

=== Television ===
Year	Title	Role	Notes	Ref(s)
1965–1970	The Wednesday Play	Balcar / Colin / Cantfield		
1967	The Golden Age	Francis		
1968	Detective	John		
1968	For Amusement Only	Second Youth		
1968	The Jazz Age	Tom Kent-Cumberland		
1969–1972	ITV Playhouse	Carr / Martin Wyld		
1969–1972	ITV Sunday Night Theatre	Steven Hindle / Basil Anthony / Desmond		
1970	Daniel Deronda	Rex Gascoigne	TV mini series	
1970	The Main Chance	Julian Webb		
1971	Doctor at Large	P.C. Mansell		
1971	Eyeless in Gaza	Brian Foxe		
1972	Late Night Theatre	Graham		
1973	Crown Court	Doctor Park		
1974	The Pallisers	Everett Wharton	TV mini series	
1975	The ITV Play	Jonathan Bridges		
1980	Armchair Thriller	Dr. Crampton		
1981	Funny Man	Max		
1982	The Year of the French	Wyndham	TV mini series	
1984	Fairly Secret Army	Professional Man		
1985	Time for Murder	Algernon		
1987	In Sickness and in Health	The Doctor		
1989	Mother Love	Boris	TV mini series	
1989–1998	The Bill	Maurice Petrow / Derek Preston		
1990	Never Come Back	Male Neighbour	TV mini series	
1994	The Cinder Path	Surgeon	TV mini series	
2000	Bomber	Hilary Quentin		

=== Theatre ===
Year	Title	Role	Company	Location	Ref(s)
1964–1965	Beauty and the Beast	The Prince	Farnham Repertory Company	Castle Theatre, Farnham	
1971–1972	Charley's Aunt	Charles Wykeham	69 Theatre Company	Apollo Theatre, London / Manchester University Theatre	
1976	Anastasia			Theatre Royal, Bath / Cambridge Theatre, London	
1977	The Deep Blue Sea	Jackie Jackson	Cambridge Theatre Company	Ashcroft Theatre, London / Cambridge Arts Theatre	

== Ancestors ==
Ancestors of Gareth Forwood

8. Ernest Harrison Forwood
4. Leslie Langton Forwood
9. Margaret Maud Lockton
2. Anthony Lytton Leslie Forwood
10. William John Westing
5. Edith Florence Westing
11. Edith Domaille
1. Gareth Langton John Forwood
12. William Johns
6. David Mervyn Johns
13. Margaret Anne Samuel
3. Glynis Margaret Payne Johns
14. Ralph Steele-Wareham
7. Alice Maude Steele-Wareham
15. Elizabeth Steele-Payne
