= Edward Craven Hawtrey =

Head Master of Eton College (1789–1862)

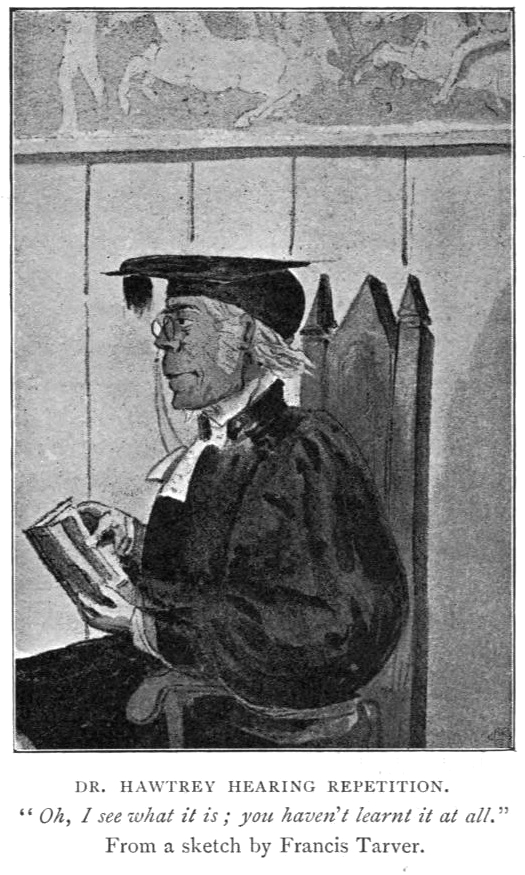
Edward Craven Hawtrey

Edward Craven Hawtrey (7 May 1789 – 27 January 1862) was an English educationalist, headmaster and later provost of Eton College.

== Life ==
Hawtrey was born at Burnham, Bucks, the son of the vicar of the parish. He was educated at Eton College and King's College, Cambridge, and in 1814 was appointed assistant master at Eton under John Keate. In 1834 he became headmaster of Eton, which role he performed until 1853, when he was elected Provost of Eton following the death of Francis Hodgson. While he was headmaster and Hodgson was Provost, new buildings were erected, including the school library and the sanatorium, the college chapel was restored, the Old Christopher Inn was closed, and the custom of Montem, the collection by street begging of funds for the university expenses of the captain of the school, was suppressed.

Hawtrey is supposed to have suggested the modern language prizes given by Prince Albert, and himself founded the prize for English essay. In 1852 he became provost of Eton, and in 1854 vicar of Mapledurham. He was buried in the Eton College chapel.

On account of his command of languages, he was known in London as "the English Mezzofanti", and he was a book collector of the finest taste. Among his own books are some translations from the English into Italian, German and Greek. He had a considerable reputation as a writer of English hexameters and as a judge of Homeric translation: his translation of a brief passage from the Iliad was described by Matthew Arnold, in On Translating Homer, as "the most successful attempt hitherto made at rendering Homer into English".

F. D. How included Hawtrey in the 1904 book Six Great Schoolmasters.

Academic offices
Preceded by John Keate	Head Master of Eton College; 1834–1853	Succeeded by Charles Old Goodford
Preceded by Francis Hodgson	Provost of Eton; 1853–1862	Succeeded by Charles Old Goodford
