= The Park School, Yeovil =

Former independent school in Yeovil, England

The Park School

Location
- Yeovil, Somerset, BA22 8BG; England
- Coordinates: 50.9981°N 2.6102°W

Information
- Type: Private day school
- Motto: Nisi dominus frustra (Unless the Lord builds all is in vain, from Psalm 127:1)
- Religious affiliation: Christian (Inter-denominational)
- Established: 1851
- Founder: Mrs Bennet
- Closed: 2020
- Local authority: Somerset
- Department for Education URN: 123917 Tables
- Head: Jane Huntington
- Gender: Mixed
- Age: 4 to 18
- Enrolment: 200~
- Colour: Green
- Website: http://www.parkschool.com/

The Park School (Yeovil) was an independent, co-educational day school, near Yeovil, Somerset, England. It had 250 students from Reception to sixth form and was the only independent school in Yeovil. Based in Yeovil since its foundation in 1851, the school moved to Chilton Cantelo in 2017–2018 where it maintained Junior, Senior and Sixth Form departments.

The school closed in May 2020.

== History ==
The school was founded in 1851 by Mrs Bennet, who was headmistress from 1851 to 1919. It was originally an all-girls school, before becoming a co-educational school in 1991. In 2017 the school acquired the buildings and grounds of the former Chilton Cantelo School and relocated the junior school and boarders in September 2017, followed by the senior school and sixth form in September 2018. The final head was Jane Huntington, who had been appointed in 2011 following Paul Bate's retirement.

== School format ==
The school was independent, co-educational with a Christian foundation. Founded as an evangelical Christian foundation, before it became a registered charity. Students were predominantly from the local area.

== School houses ==
Students and staff (apart from P.E teachers, and headteachers) were placed into one of four school houses. Families were always put into the same house. The houses were: (house colour in brackets)

- Müller (formerly Ashley) (green)
- Slessor (yellow)
- Shaftesbury (red)
- Livingstone (blue)

Ashley House was formally changed to Müller following a school referendum in 2014. Head of House, Mr. Richard Coles, suggested that a change of name would be a suitable way to mark the centenary of the start of WW1. The other three houses were named after Christian philanthropists. Ashley, however, was named after Ashley Down in Bristol, which was the location of the George Müller's children's homes. The prefects in the interwar years felt that it was unfitting to have a house with a Germanic name, but still wanted to recognise the work of Müller.

== Closure ==
In April 2020 the school was placed into administration following the withdrawal of a loan offer due to the COVID-19 pandemic. It closed in May 2020.
