= Funny Man (TV series) =

- Genre: Comedy
- Starring: Jimmy Jewel; David Schofield
- Country of origin: United Kingdom
- Original language: English
- No. of series: 1
- No. of episodes: 13

Production
- Producers: Anthea Browne-Wilkinson; Peter Duguid
- Running time: 60 minutes
- Production company: Thames Television

Original release
- Network: ITV
- Release: 23 April – 23 July 1981

Funny Man is a British comedy television series which first aired on ITV in 1981. It portrays a family of music hall entertainers in the late 1920s and early 1930s, at the time of the Great Depression and the continuing desertion of traditional music hall audiences to the cinemas. Star Jimmy Jewel had himself grown up in a family of comedians active during the era.

Actors who appeared in individual episodes include Elsie Randolph, Nell Campbell, Sylvia Coleridge, Madeline Smith and Leslie Sarony

== Cast ==
- Jimmy Jewel as Alec Gibson (13 episodes)
- David Schofield as Davey Gibson (13 episodes)
- Andrew Fell as Teddy Gibson (13 episodes)
- Jean Boht as Elsie (13 episodes)
- Sharon Duce as Kath Gibson (11 episodes)
- Lynda Bellingham as Gwen (11 episodes)
- Trudie Styler as Babs (11 episodes)
- Lesley Hand as Wendy (11 episodes)
- Veronica Doran as Freda (11 episodes)
- Tricia Ford as Dolly (10 episodes)
- Marianne Price as Rose (9 episodes)
- Pamela Stephenson as Iris Reade (9 episodes)
- Barrie Ingham as Bobby Stobart (7 episodes)
- Jonathan Adams as Brendan Sykes (6 episodes)
- Bob Todd as Billy Strothers (6 episodes)
- Joanna Van Gyseghem as Peggy Stobart (6 episodes)
- Pearl Hackney as Gloria Leslie (5 episodes)
- Arthur English as George Leslie (5 episodes)
- Billy Milton as Ozzie (5 episodes)
- John Blythe as Cecil Foster (4 episodes)
- Alfred Marks as Ainsley King (4 episodes)
- Gareth Forwood as Max (3 episodes)
- Betty Alberge as Mrs Gibson (1 episode)

== Bibliography ==
- Leslie Halliwell. Double Take and Fade Away. Grafton, 1987.
