= The Bofors Gun =

1968 British drama film by Jack Gold

- DVD cover art
- Directed by: Jack Gold
- Written by: John McGrath
- Based on: Events While Guarding the Bofors Gun by John McGrath
- Produced by: Robert A. Goldston; Otto Plaschkes
- Starring: Nicol Williamson; David Warner; Ian Holm; Gareth Forwood; John Thaw
- Cinematography: Alan Hume
- Edited by: Anne V. Coates
- Music by: Carl Davis
- Production companies: Copelfilms; Everglades Productions; Avernus Productions; Universal Pictures
- Distributed by: Universal Pictures
- Release date: April 1968
- Running time: 105 minutes
- Country: United Kingdom
- Language: English
- Budget: $800,000 or £160,442 or £171,058

The Bofors Gun is a 1968 British drama film directed by Jack Gold and starring Nicol Williamson, David Warner, Ian Holm and John Thaw. It was written by John McGrath based on his 1966 play Events While Guarding the Bofors Gun. Set in 1954, during the British peacetime occupation of West Germany following the Second World War, it portrays the increasingly violent interaction between members of a squad of soldiers during a single night of guard duty.

== Plot ==
West Germany, 1954. Lance Bombardier Evans, a sheltered middle-class National Serviceman, is about to be sent back to England to undertake a second attempt at officer training. But first he has to get through one night of guard duty without incident. Evans is in charge of a section of six men detailed to guard an anti-aircraft Bofors gun at a British military base. It soon becomes clear that, with the exception of Flynn, none of the section have any respect for Evans, guessing rightly that he has no enthusiasm and little ability in his role. Gunner O'Rourke in particular is troublesome and insubordinate, his contempt for Evans spurring him to test the authority and patience of the weak-willed non-commissioned officer (NCO). Evans' fumbling attempts to engage him in friendly conversation only make matters worse. The atmosphere grows more tense and O'Rourke strikes one of the other men, Rowe and then dares Evans to place him on a disciplinary charge but the NCO is too nervously intimidated to do so. O'Rourke and his sidekick Featherstone insist on being allowed to go to the NAAFI to buy cigarettes and Evans ill-advisedly lets them go.

O'Rourke confides to Featherstone that at midnight it will be his 30th birthday and the two decide to go the canteen and start drinking, knowing full well it is forbidden whilst on guard duty. O'Rourke, having endured a grim childhood and the harsh, unjust punishments of the army for all his adult life, is at breaking point. Drunk and unstable, he tries to kill himself by jumping out of an upper-storey window but only suffers minor injuries. Evans refuses to report the incident but not out of any genuine concern for O'Rourke but rather out of fear that it might affect his chances of becoming an officer. Sgt Walker, a much stronger NCO, arrives on a visit only to find Evans has apparently lost control of his section. Walker, aware of Evans' lack of experience, is prepared to turn a blind eye to the mess provided Evans disciplines O'Rourke. Evans refuses, prompting Walker to warn him that when he returns, he will bring the duty officer with him and that Evans had better have his section back in order. An exasperated Flynn tries to convince Evans that he needs to exert some authority and that his attempts to win O'Rourke over by being lenient will not work.

O'Rourke and Featherstone, drunk and dishevelled, finally return. Ignoring Flynn's advice to report them, Evans is still convinced he can retrieve the situation himself and he puts O'Rourke on guard duty. Walker and Lieutenant Pickering arrive for the nightly inspection when Evans is checking on O'Rourke, still trying to talk him round. O'Rourke angrily accuses Evans of caring more about his own chances of becoming an officer than he does about the welfare of his own men. Evans admits that this is true, saying that becoming an officer represents his only chance of going home. O'Rourke threatens to attempt suicide again but Evans is too preoccupied with his own problems to really hear him. Walker orders the section to assemble for inspection and Evans goes back to the guard hut only to be ordered to fetch O'Rourke. He goes back to the Bofors gun only to discover that O'Rourke has stripped to the waist and fatally stabbed himself in the abdomen with a bayonet. Evans angrily kicks O'Rourke's corpse, knowing that his chances of going back to England are ruined. Walker and Lt Pickering arrive and Evans, now destined to spend the rest of his service in the ranks, has to face the full force of military punishment.

== Cast ==
- Nicol Williamson as Gunner O'Rourke
- Ian Holm as Gunner Flynn
- David Warner as Lance Bombardier Terry "Lance Bar" Evans
- Peter Vaughan as Sergeant Walker
- John Thaw as Gunner Featherstone
- Barry Jackson as Gunner Shone
- Richard O'Callaghan as Gunner Rowe
- Gareth Forwood as Lieutenant Pickering
- Donald Gee as Gunner Crowley
- Barbara Jefford as NAAFI girl
- Geoffrey Hughes as Private Samuel, cook
- John Herrington as German Pointer
- Lindsay Campbell as Captain Cheeseman
- Glynn Edwards as Sergeant-Major West

== Production ==
The film's budget was an estimated $800,000.

== Critical reception ==
The Monthly Film Bulletin wrote: "There are no tricks of style, no obvious directorial touches; [Gold's] control of his subject is so unobtrusive that an audience can get his points without noticing him make them. ... The Bofors Gun is a film that appeals (or fails to appeal, for there are those who react to it with distaste) on the strength of its emotional textures rather than its argument. ...The feeling that hangs over the whole film is that nobody cares about anybody else. ...The film asks questions like "What is life about?" and does it with enough vehemence to disturb even the most complacently well-adjusted. The achievement is far from accidental. Study, for instance, the images of parallel despair in O'Rourke and Evans that lead up to O’Rourke's first suicide attempt. They are images of birth rather than death, images that lead into life as well as out of it. With his first film Gold also reveals himself as an excellent director of actors: Nicol Williamson gives a shattering performance as the manic, intransigent Irishman, and all the acting has a fine, astringent quality that compels attention."

Vincent Canby in The New York Times wrote that it "played with such unaffected honesty ... I totally accepted its high-pitched, stylised reality." Canby also praised the performances of both Warner and Williamson, describing the latter's performance as O'Rourke as "a man who has peered over the edge of his soul and seen a terrible void. During this night, O'Rourke is preparing to jump into that void – and to take Bombardier Evans with him. How he destroys Evans – using the man's own vanities – is the story of the film."

Variety wrote: "It has all the gripping fascination of a tussle between two wily, desperate young animals. Taut, icy direction and acting flawlessly ... bring a faultless realism."

The Spectator wrote: "Nicol Williamson's high-voltage performance is obviously plugged in to some private dynamo: he clears the ground around him, turns it into a kind of disaster area, persuades you that something ominous and intolerable is about to happen. But as he shouts and David Warner shivers, the splenetic confrontation seems to be between actors rather than valid characters."

Leslie Halliwell said: "Keen, fascinating, but often crude and eventually rather silly expansion of a TV play chiefly notable for the excellent acting opportunities privided by its unattractive but recognisable characters."

== Accolades ==
At the 22nd British Academy Film Awards, Williamson received a nomination for Best Actor in a Leading Role, and Holm won Best Actor in a Supporting Role.
