= BAFTA Award for Best Actor in a Supporting Role =

British film industry award

BAFTA Award for Best Supporting Actor
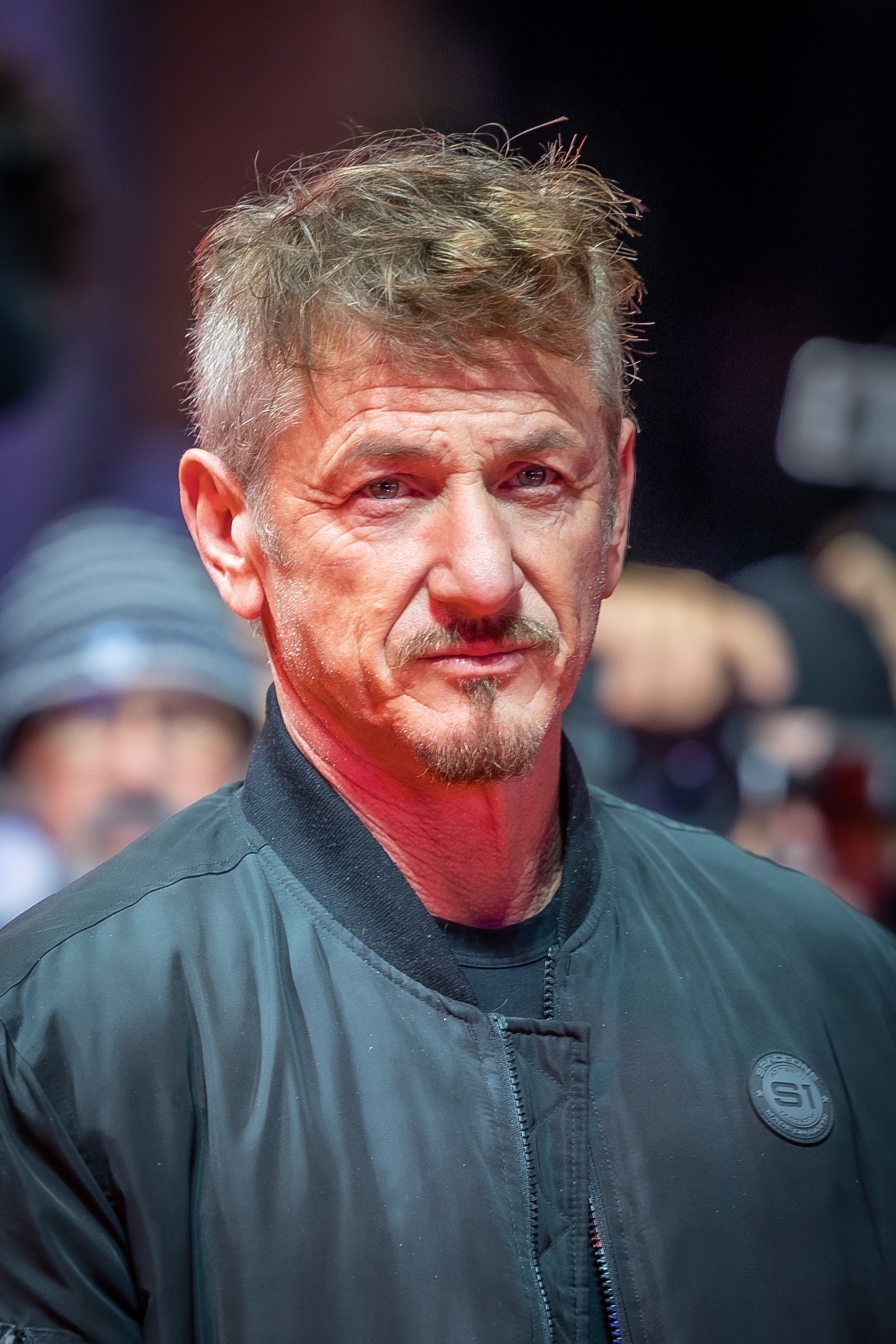
- The 2025 recipient: Sean Penn
- Awarded for: Best Performance by an Actor in a Supporting Role
- Location: United Kingdom
- Presented by: British Academy of Film and Television Arts
- Currently held by: Sean Penn for One Battle After Another (2025)
- Website: http://www.bafta.org/

Best Actor in a Supporting Role is a British Academy Film Award presented annually by the British Academy of Film and Television Arts (BAFTA) to recognise an actor who has delivered an outstanding supporting performance in a film.

In the following lists, the titles and names in bold with a gold background are the winners and recipients respectively; those not in bold are the nominees. The years given are those in which the films under consideration were released, not the year of the ceremony, which always takes place the following year.

== History ==
Since 1968, selected actors have been awarded with the BAFTA Award for Best Actor in a Supporting Role at an annual ceremony. The Best Supporting Actor award has been presented a total of 54 times to 48 different actors. No award was given out in this category in 1980, when no actors, male or female, were nominated for supporting roles. In addition, the award was replaced with a gender-neutral category for Best Supporting Artist, allotted for the year 1981 only, with all four nominees that year being male. The first winner was Ian Holm for his role in The Bofors Gun. The most recent winner is Sean Penn for his role in One Battle After Another. The record for most wins is three, held by Denholm Elliott, who won three consecutive times, while five other actors have won twice. Elliott also holds the record for most nominations, with seven.

== Winners and nominees ==
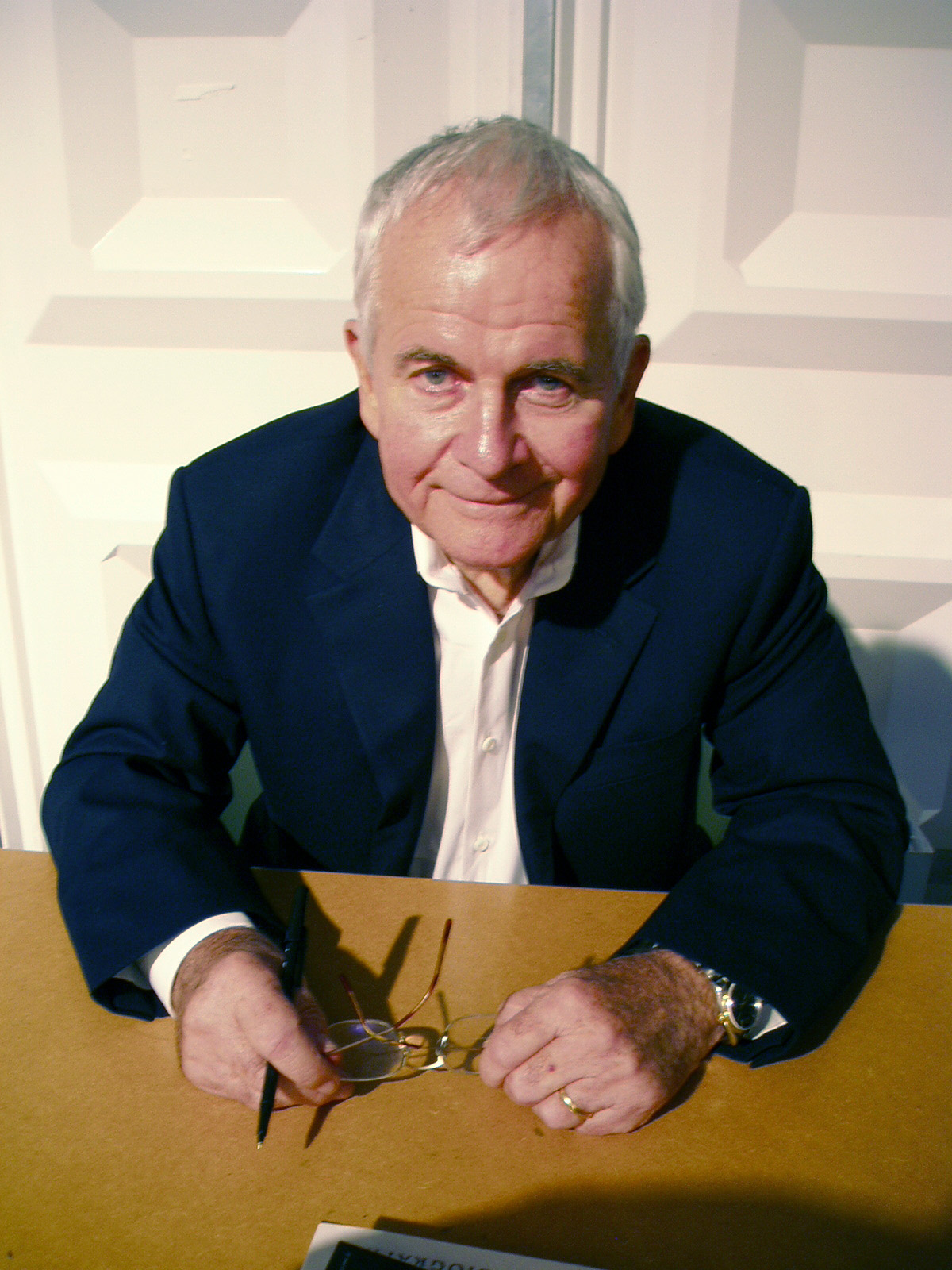
Ian Holm won twice for The Bofors Gun (1968) and Chariots of Fire (1981).

indicates the winner

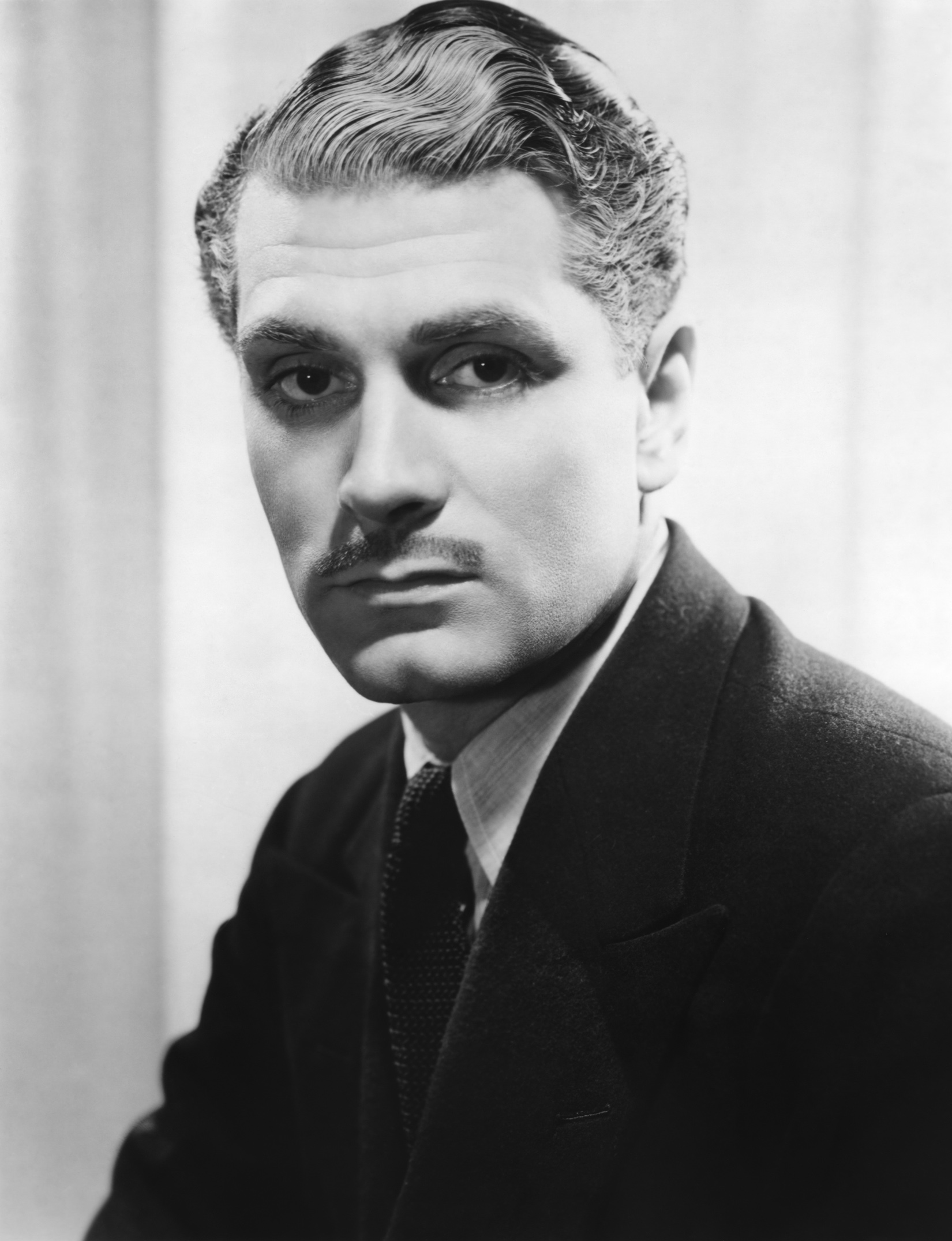
Laurence Olivier won for Oh! What a Lovely War (1969).

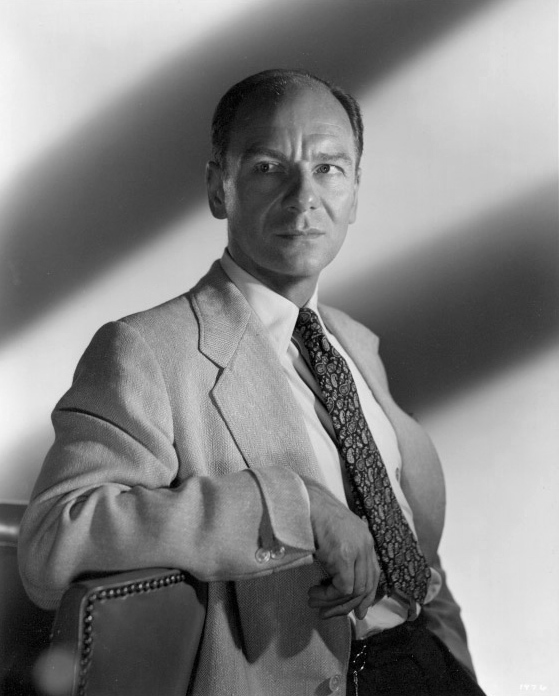
John Gielgud won for Murder on the Orient Express (1974)

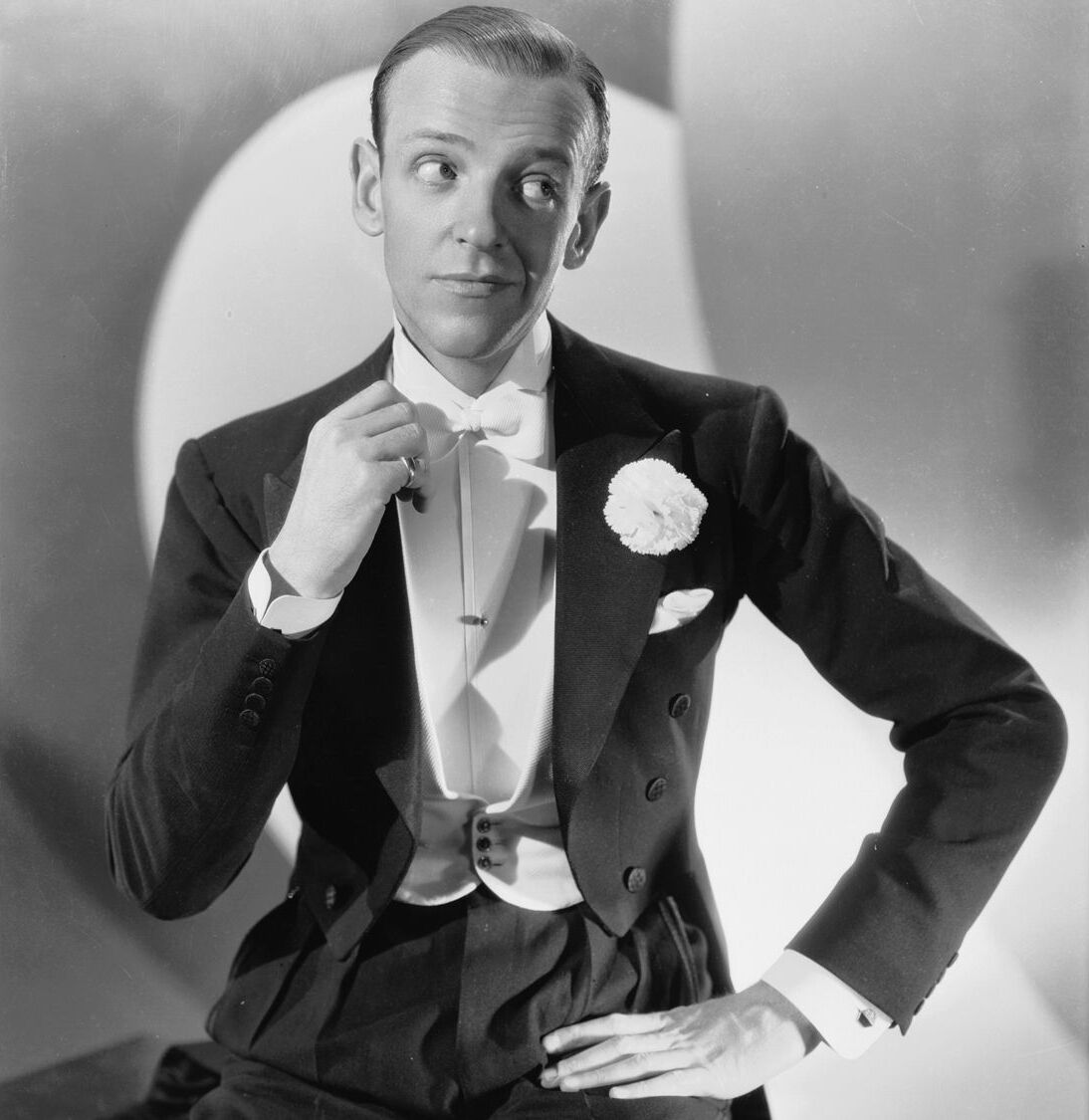
Fred Astaire won for The Towering Inferno (1975).

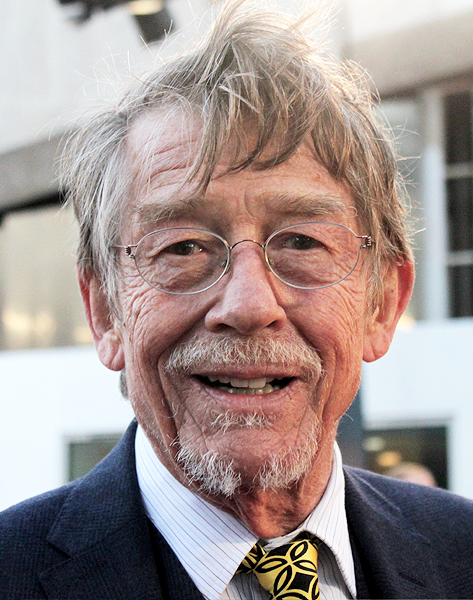
John Hurt won for Midnight Express (1978)

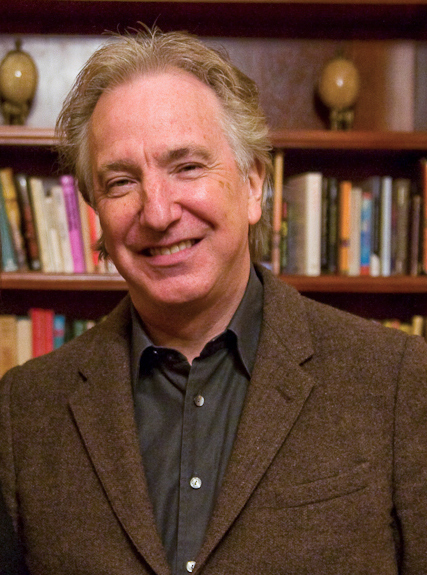
Alan Rickman won for Robin Hood: Prince of Thieves (1991).

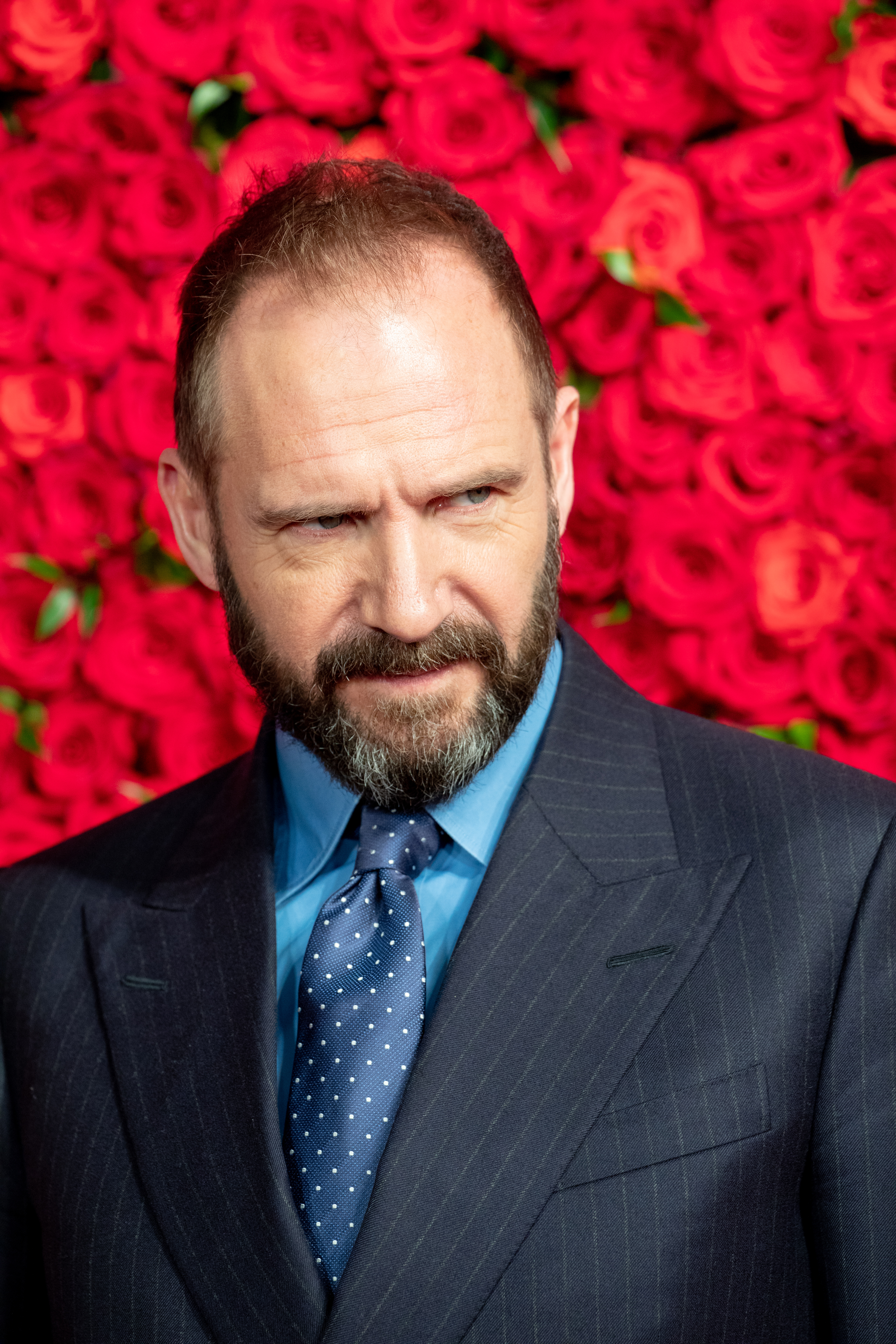
Ralph Fiennes won for Schindler's List (1993).

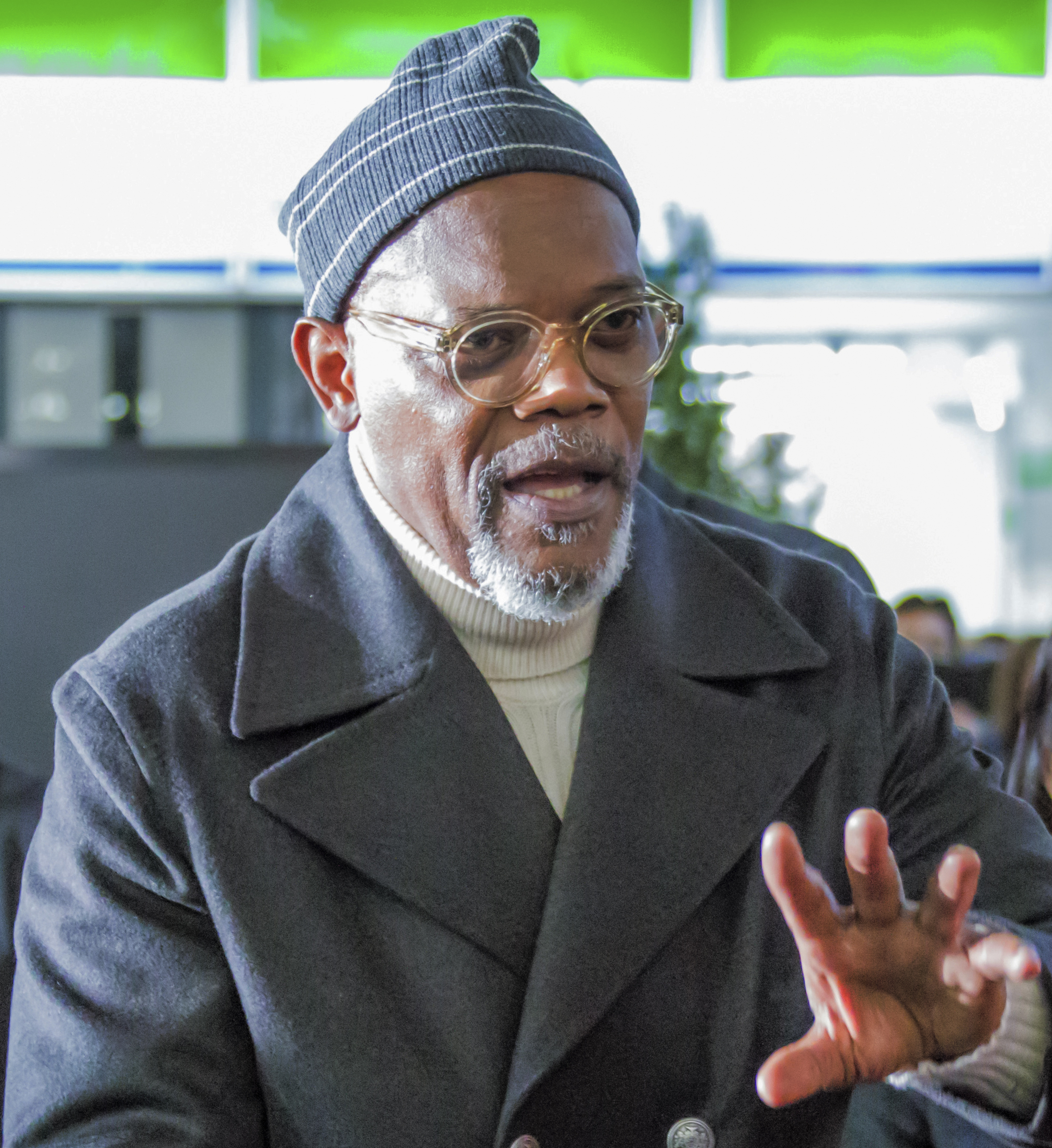
Samuel L. Jackson won for Pulp Fiction (1994).

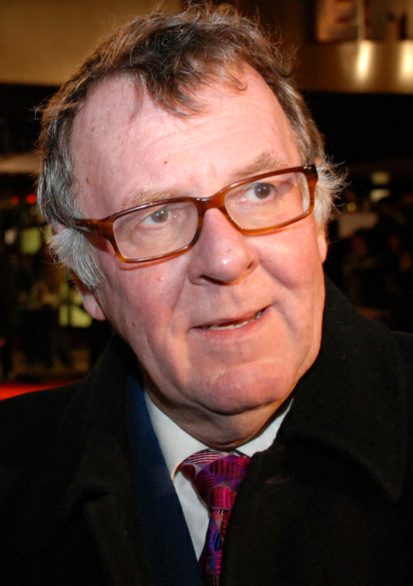
Tom Wilkinson won for The Full Monty (1997).

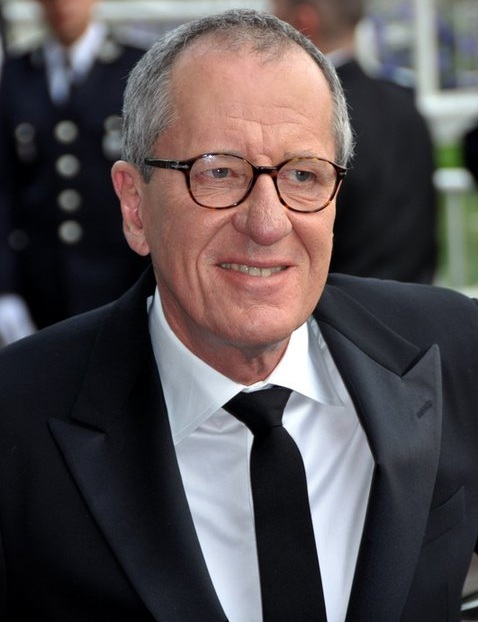
Geoffrey Rush won twice, for Shakespeare in Love (1998) and The King's Speech (2010).

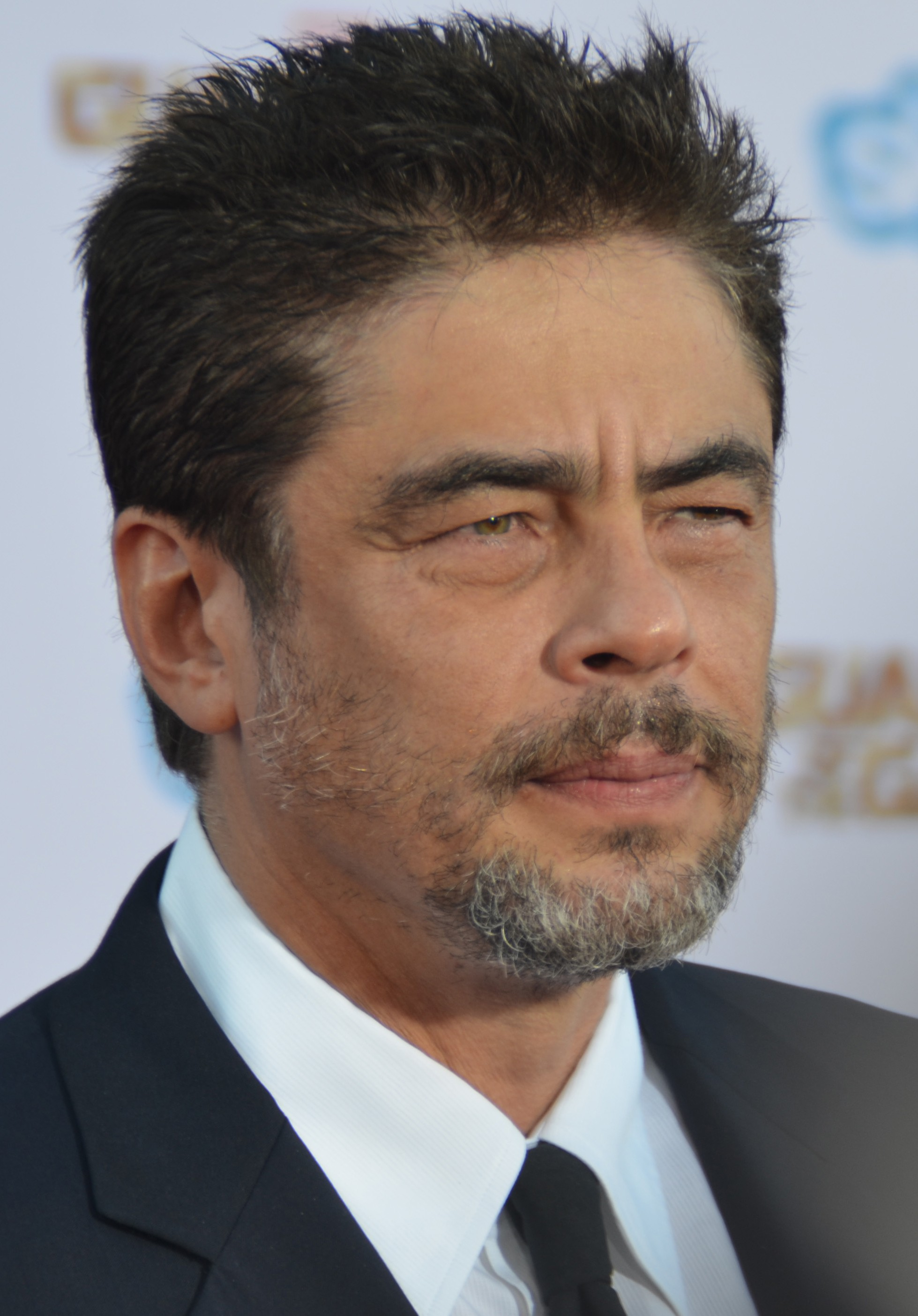
Benicio del Toro won for Traffic (2000).

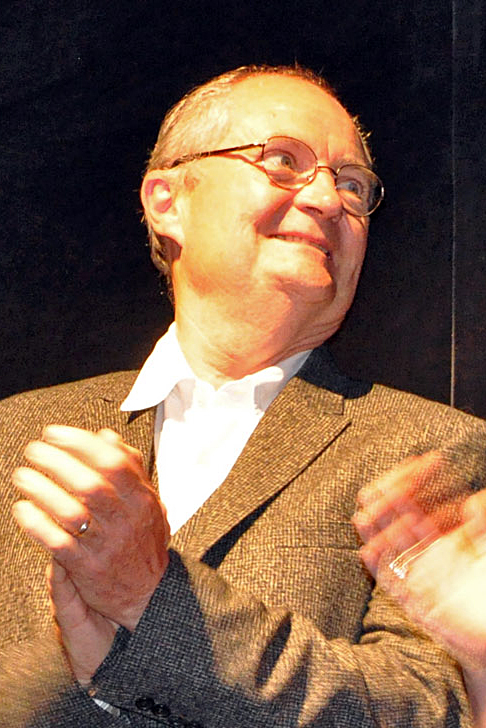
Jim Broadbent won for Moulin Rouge! (2001).

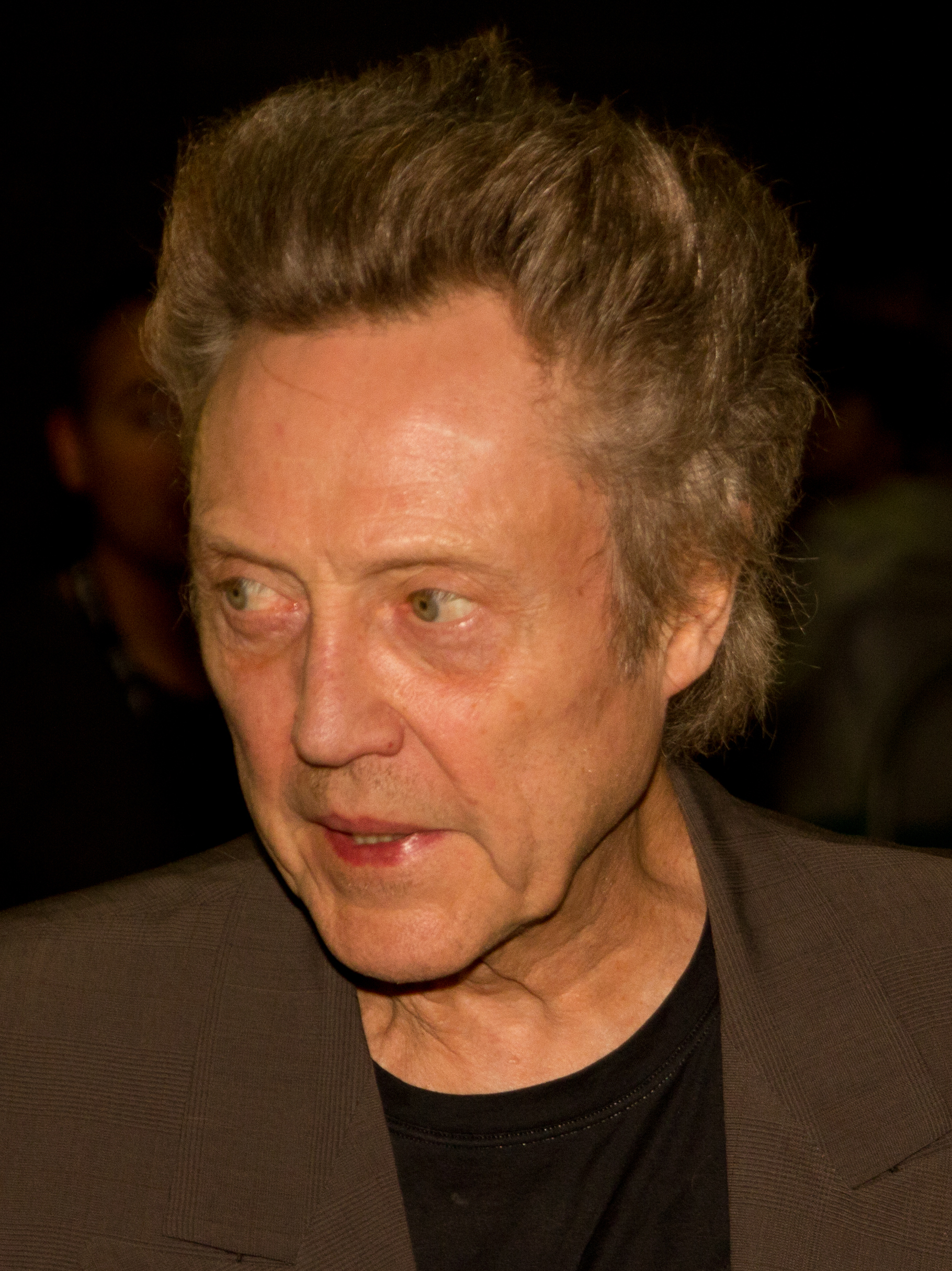
Christopher Walken won for Catch Me If You Can (2002).

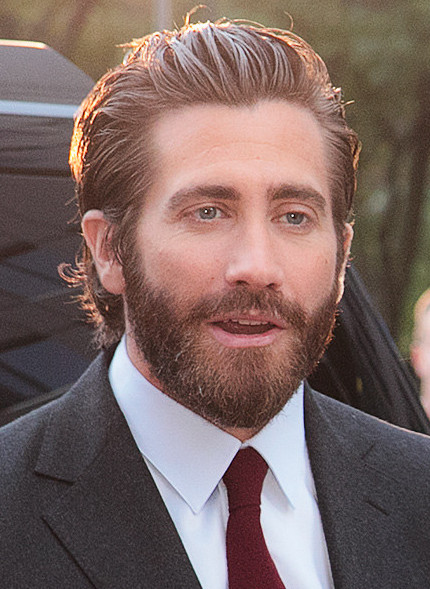
Jake Gyllenhaal won for Brokeback Mountain (2005).

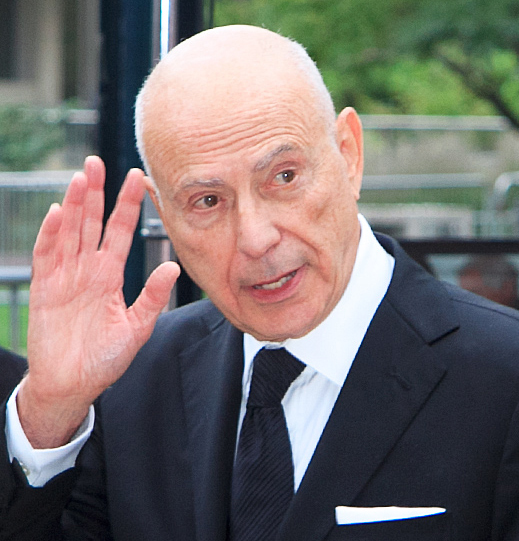
Alan Arkin won for Little Miss Sunshine (2006).

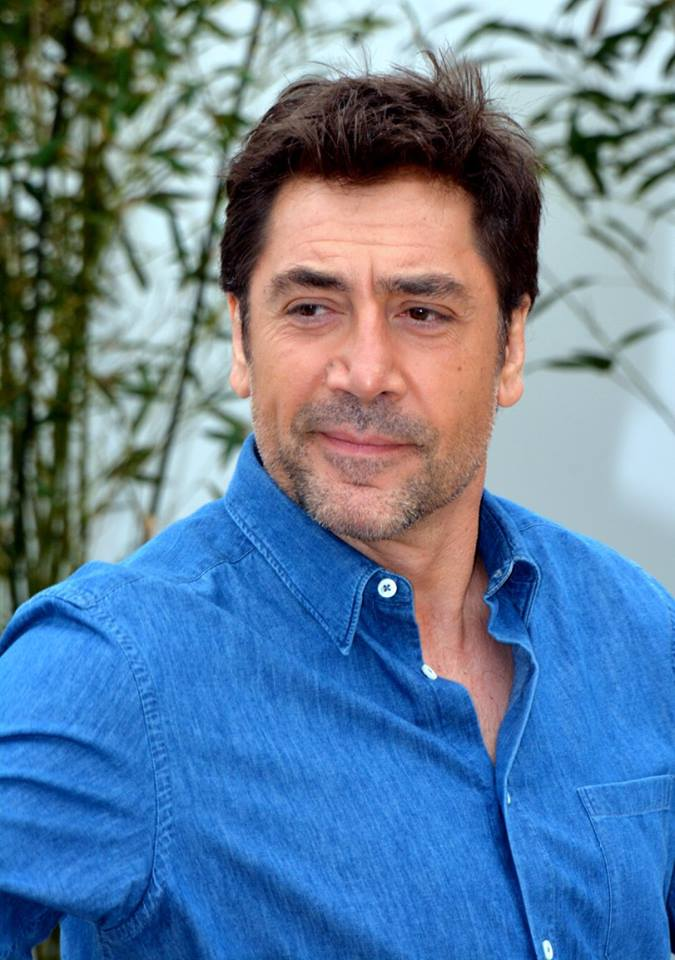
Javier Bardem won for No Country for Old Men (2007).

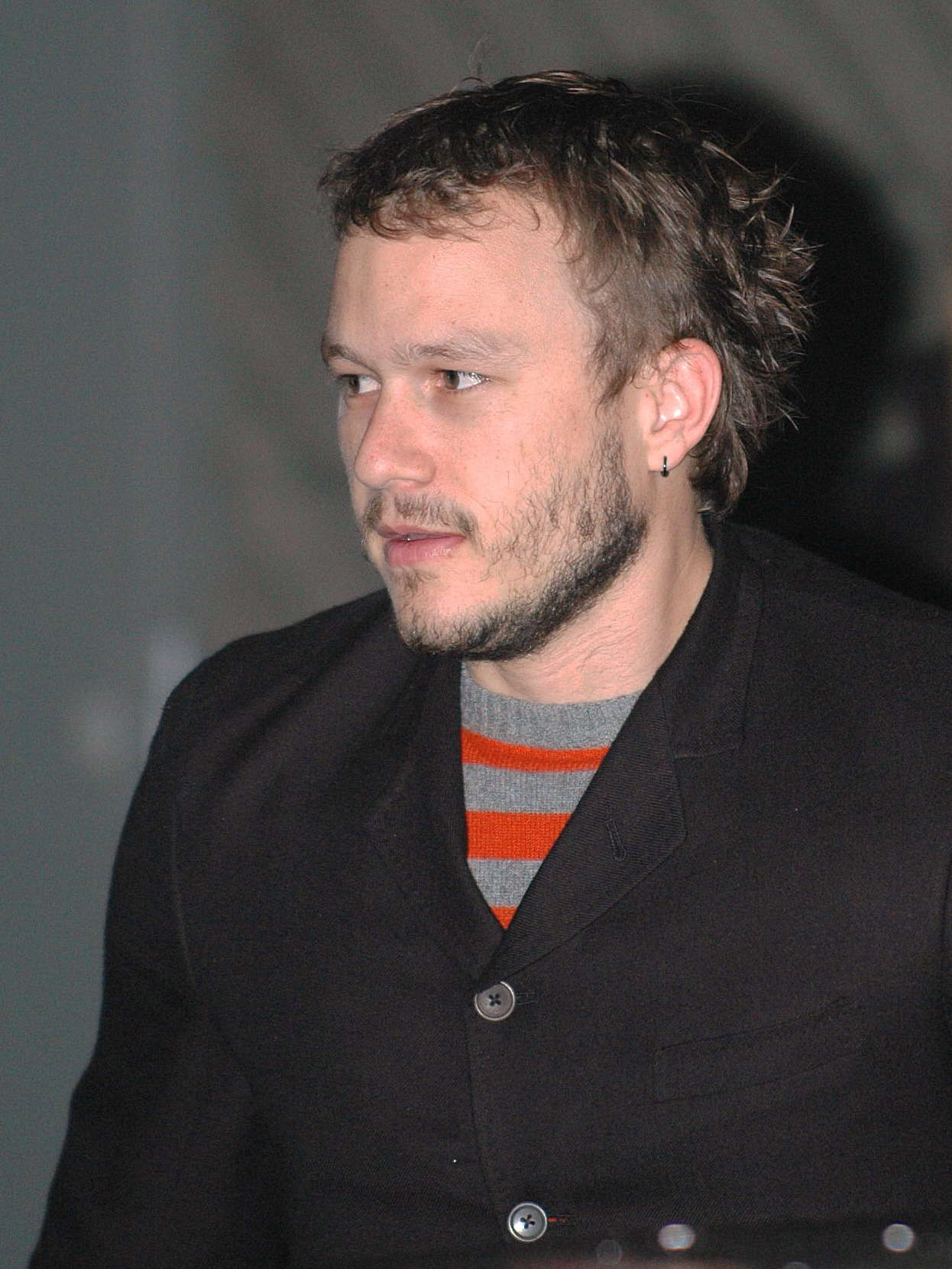
Heath Ledger won posthumously for The Dark Knight (2008).

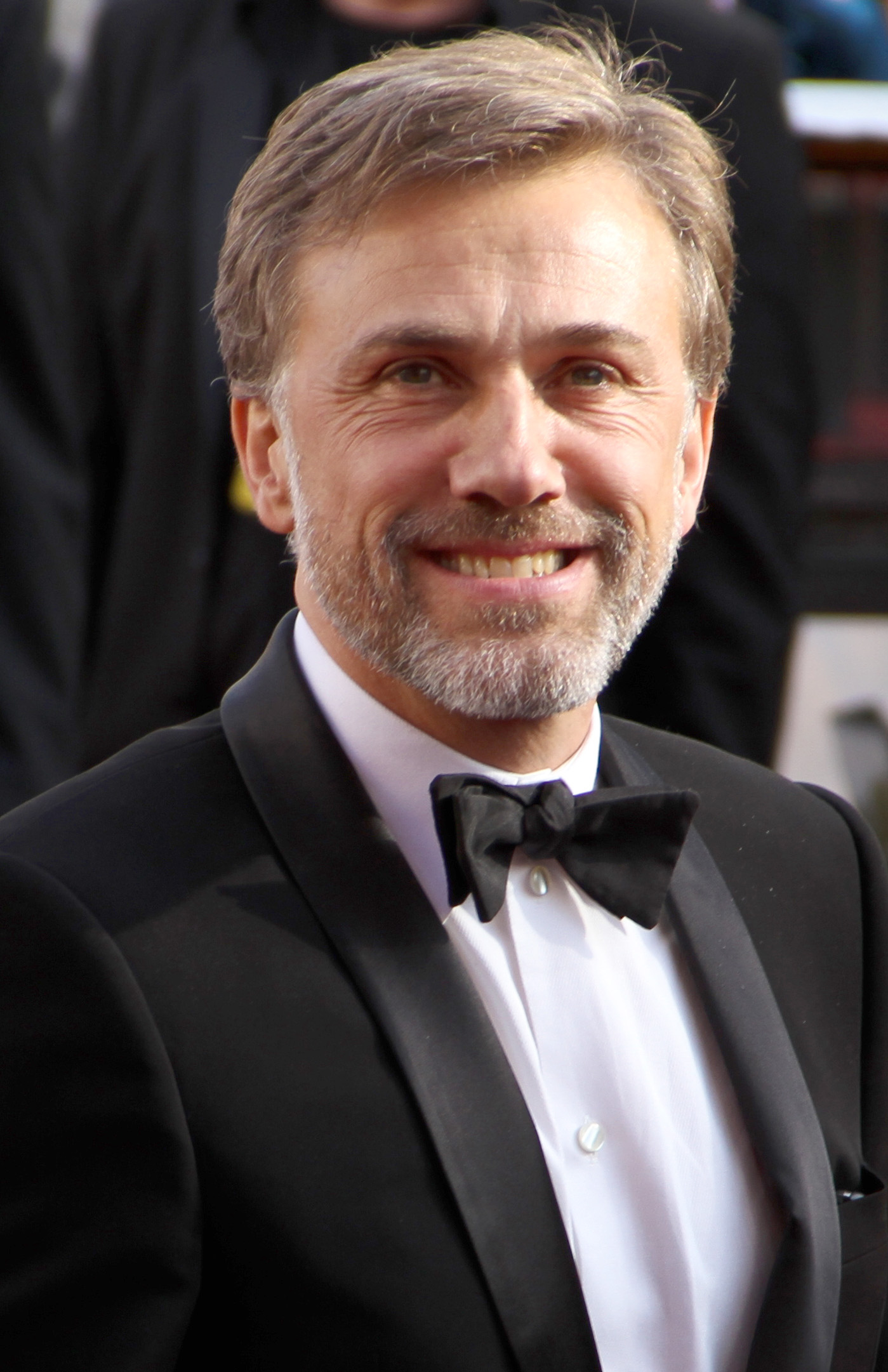
Christoph Waltz won twice, for Inglourious Basterds (2009) and Django Unchained (2012).

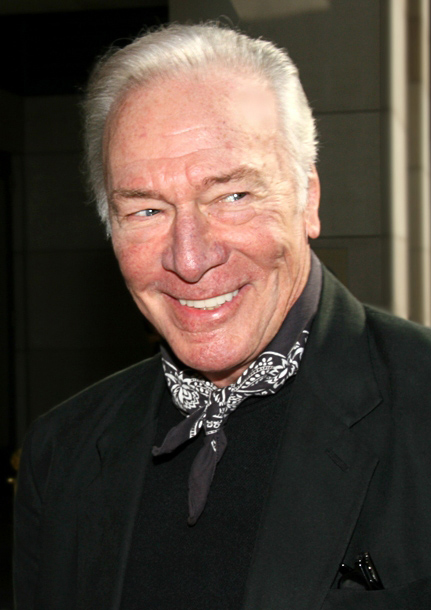
Christopher Plummer won for Beginners (2011).

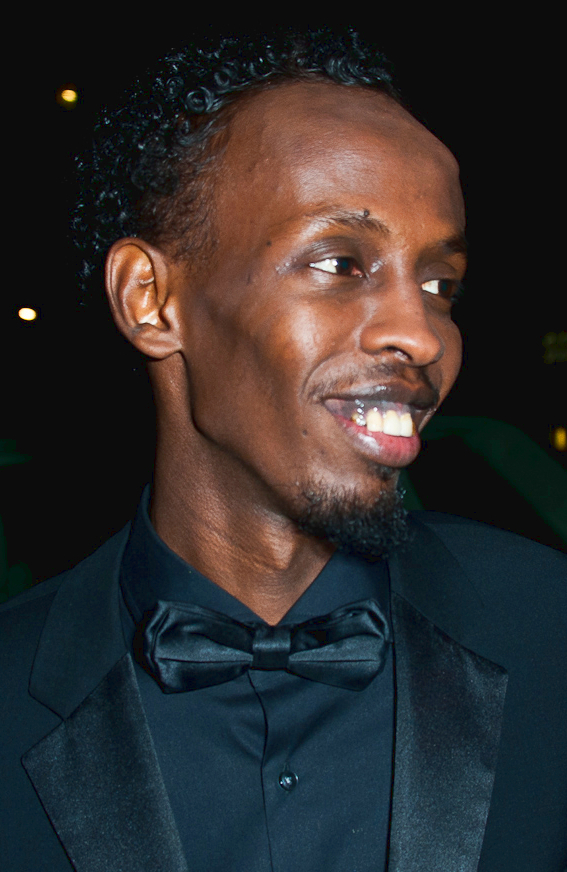
Barkhad Abdi won for Captain Phillips (2013).

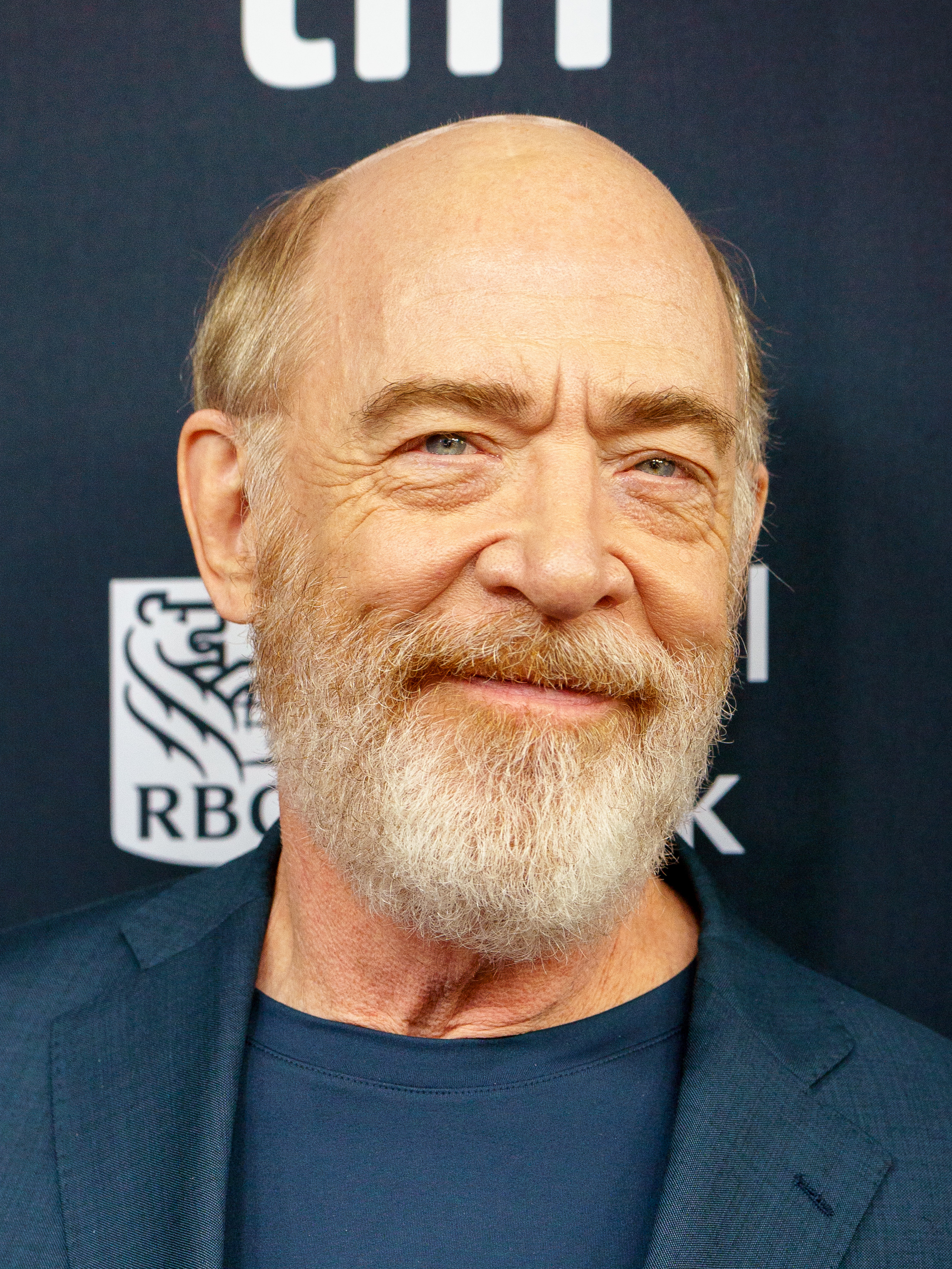
JK Simmons won for Whiplash (2014).

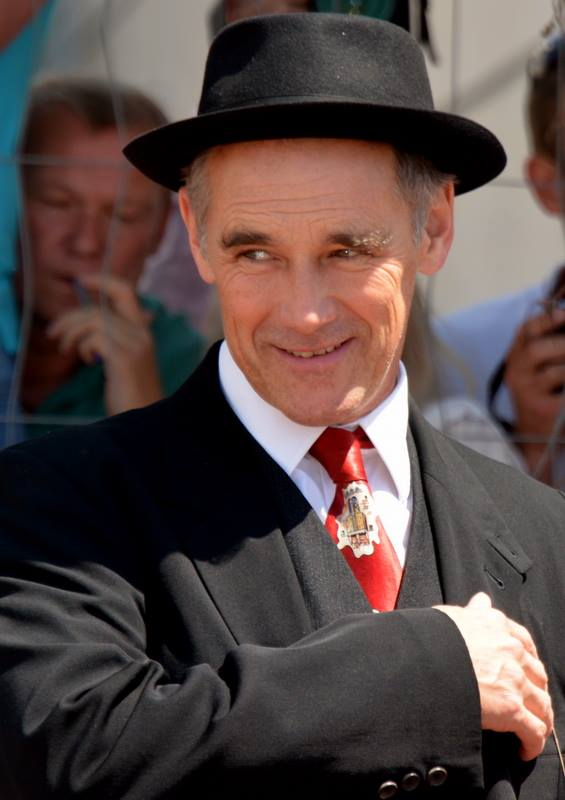
Mark Rylance won for Bridge of Spies (2015).

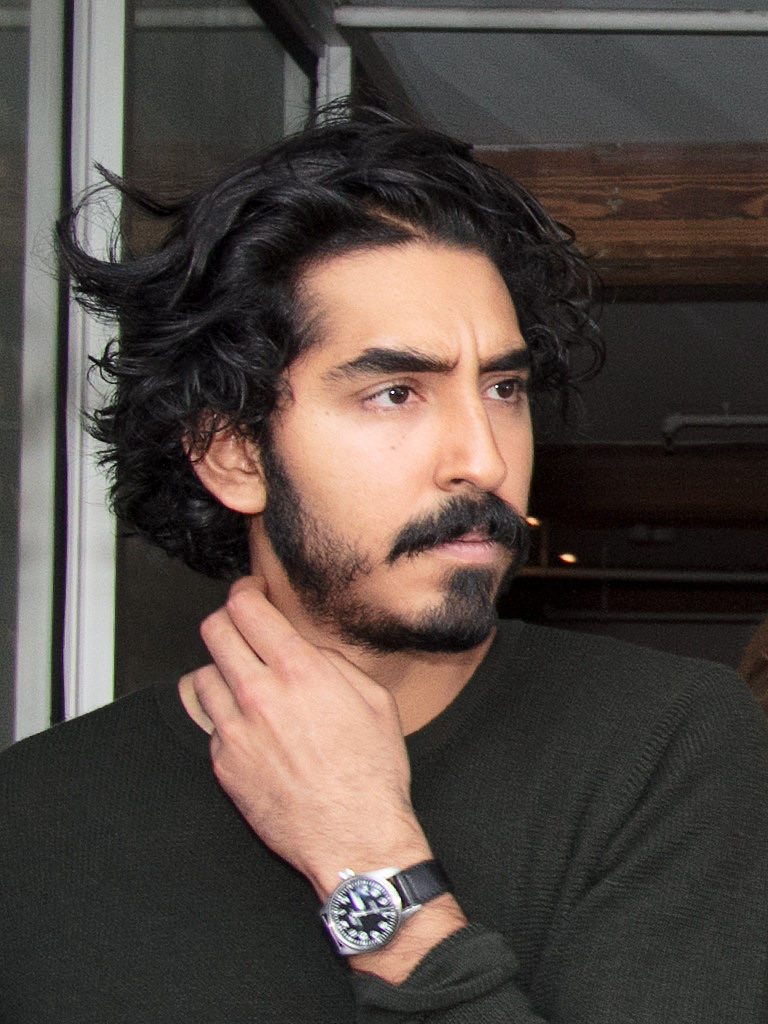
Dev Patel won for Lion (2016).

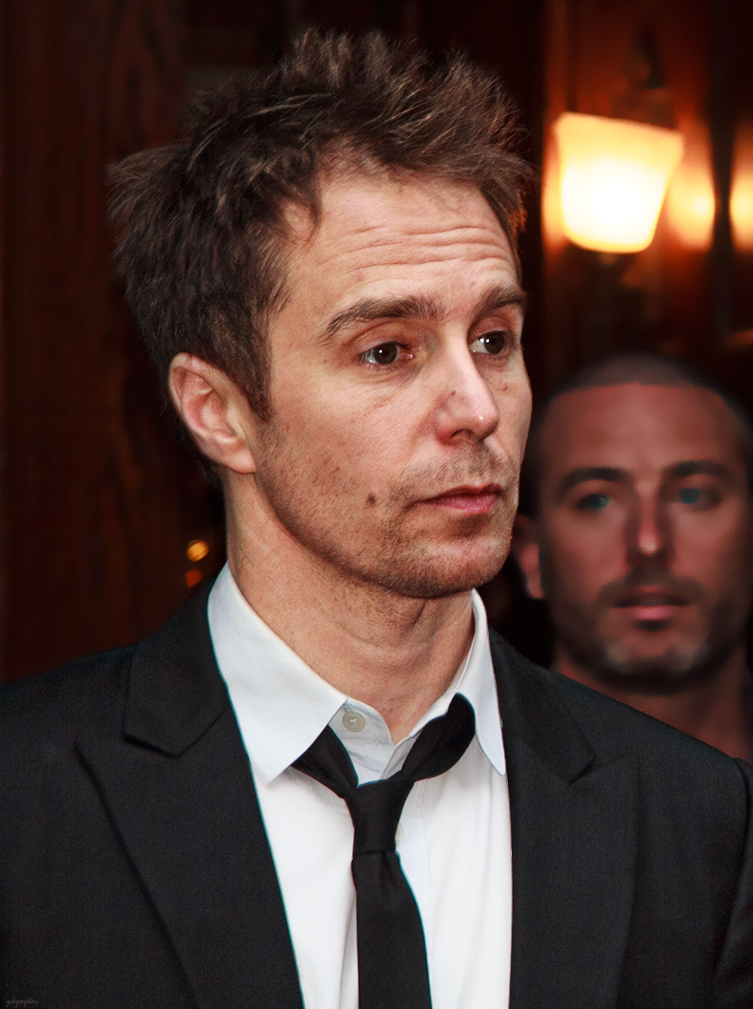
Sam Rockwell won for Three Billboards Outside Ebbing, Missouri (2017).

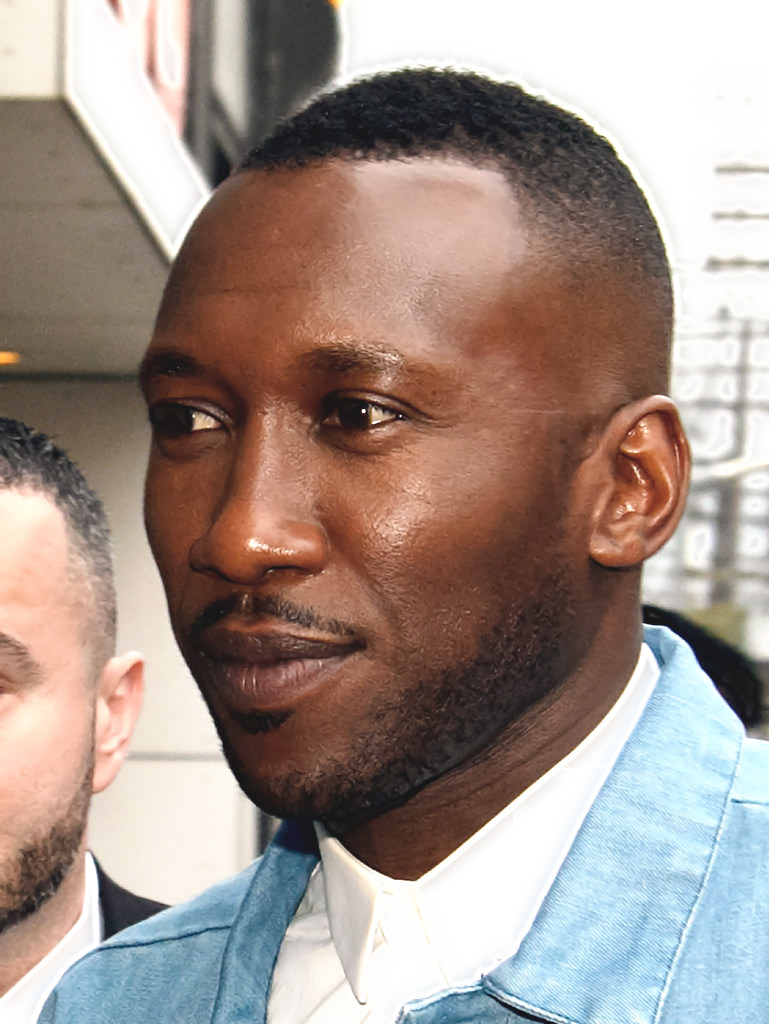
Mahershala Ali won for Green Book (2018).

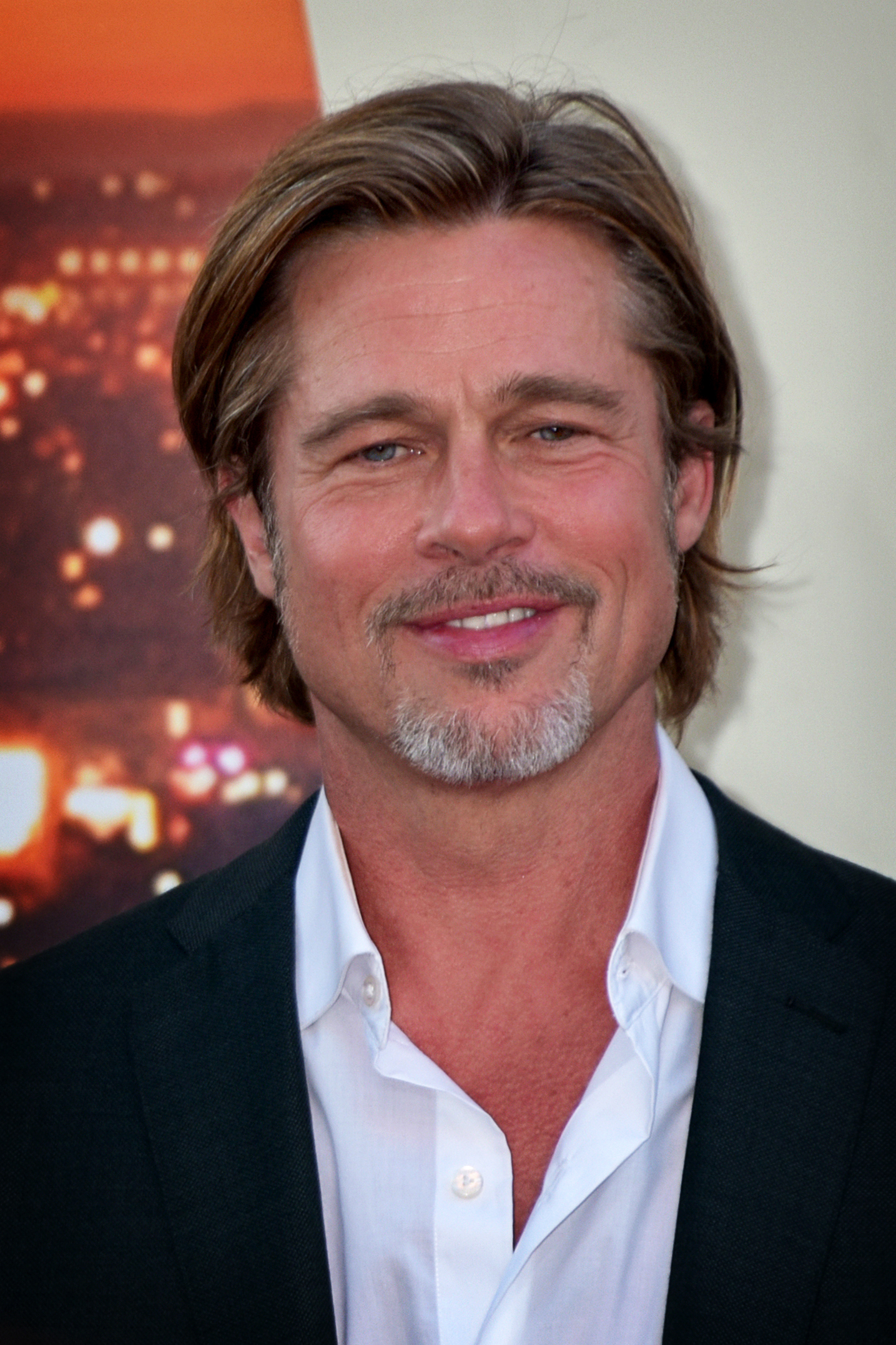
Brad Pitt won for Once Upon a Time in Hollywood (2019)

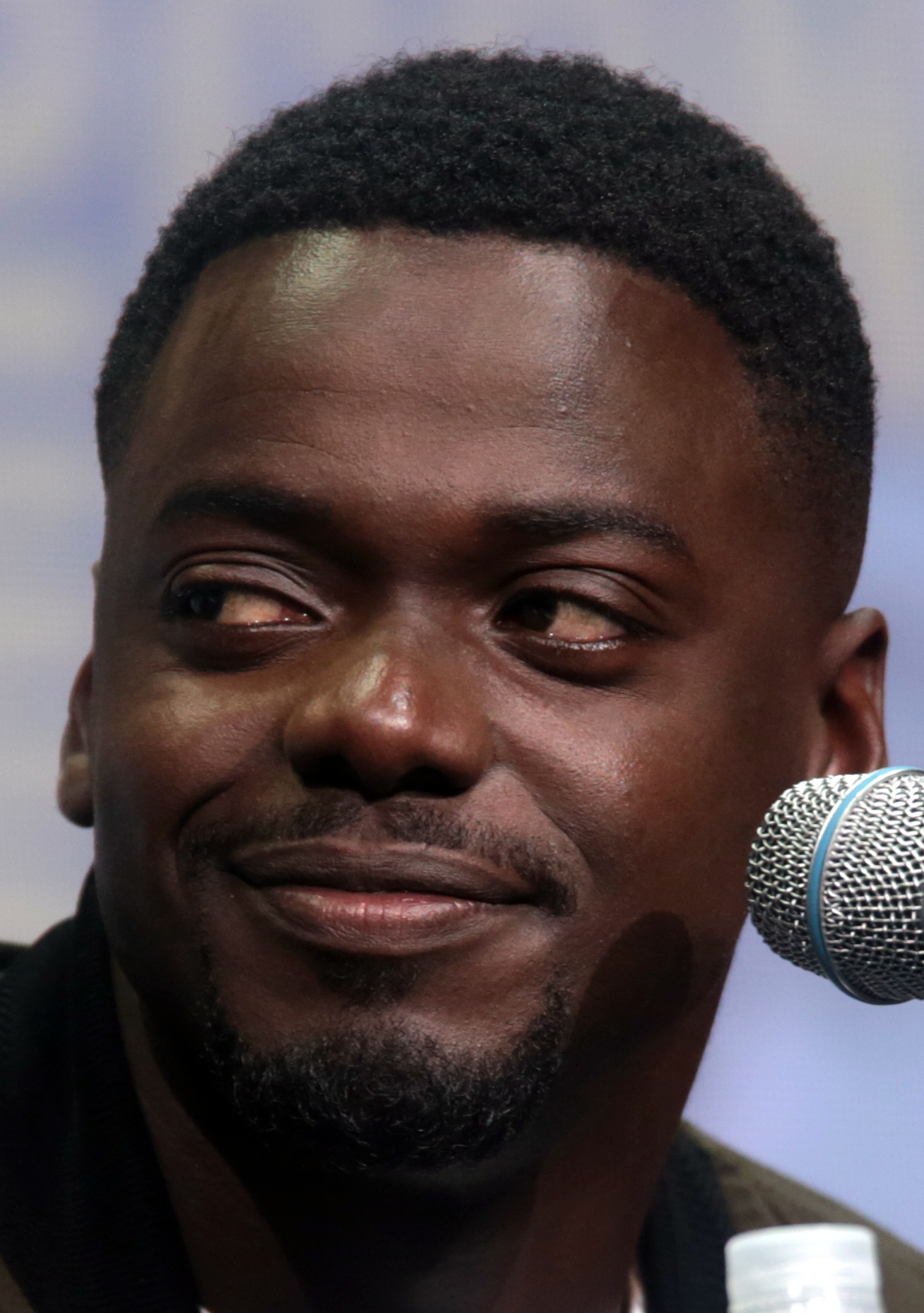
Daniel Kaluuya won for Judas and the Black Messiah (2021).

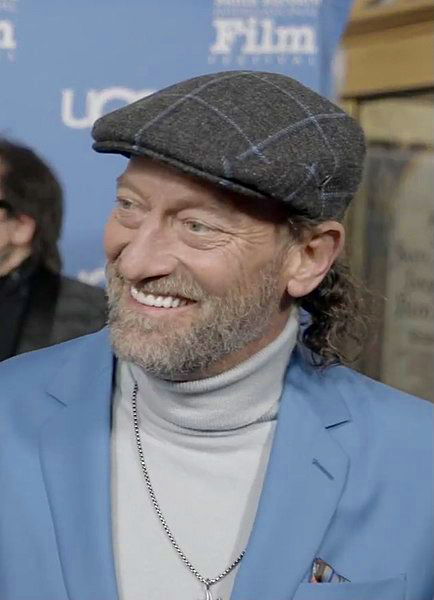
Troy Kotsur won for CODA (2021).

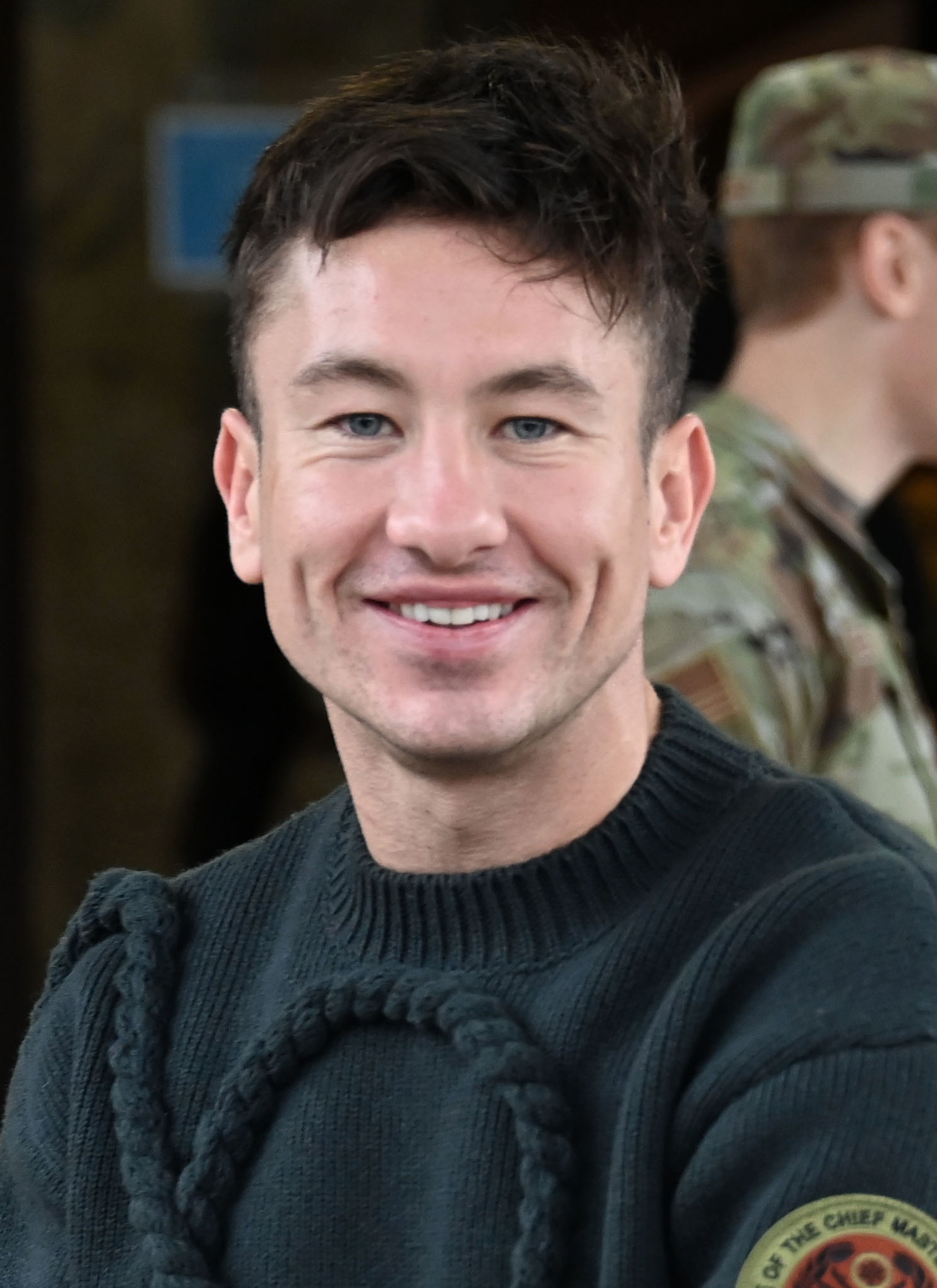
Barry Keoghan won for The Banshees of Inisherin (2022).

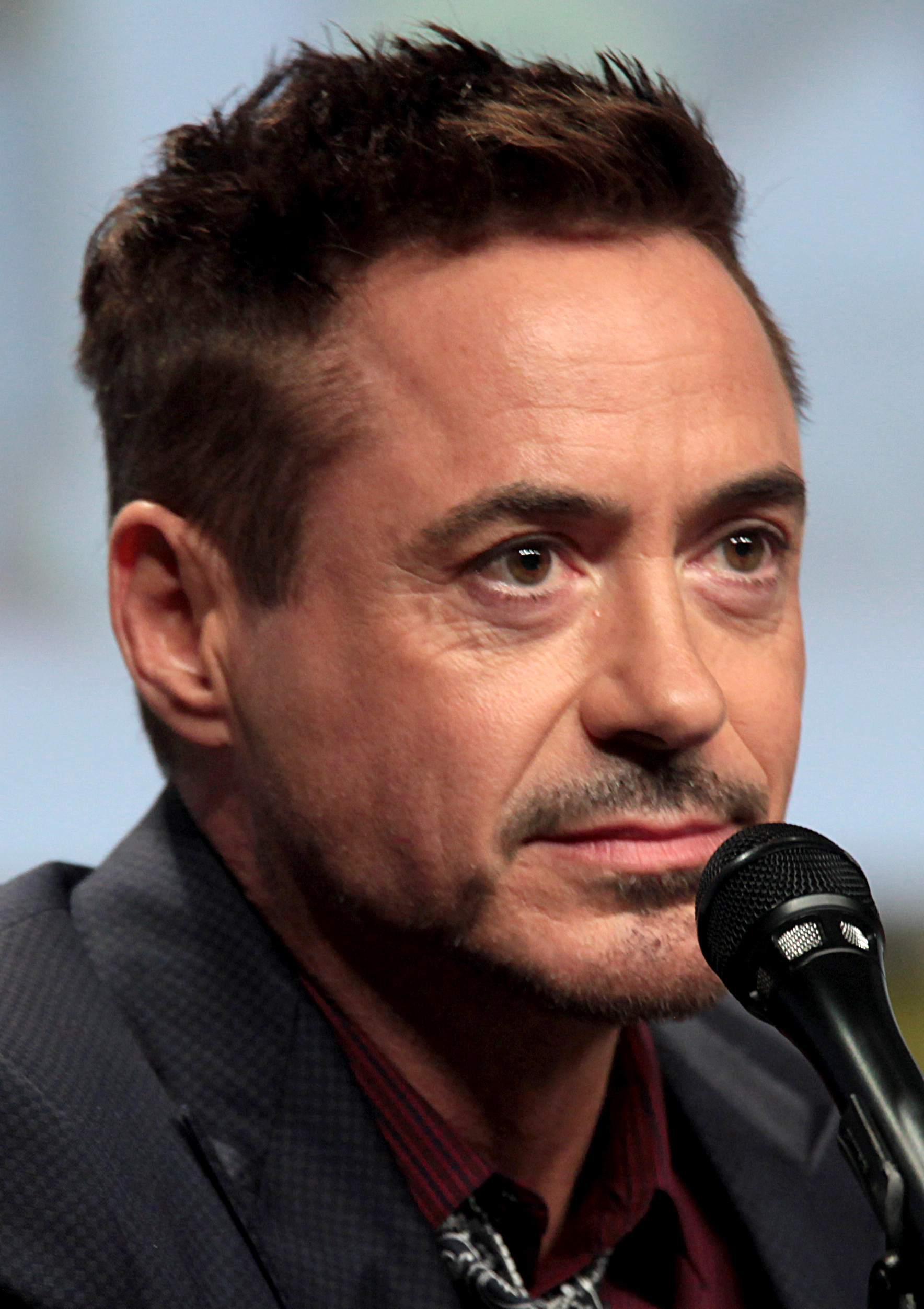
Robert Downey Jr. won for Oppenheimer (2023).

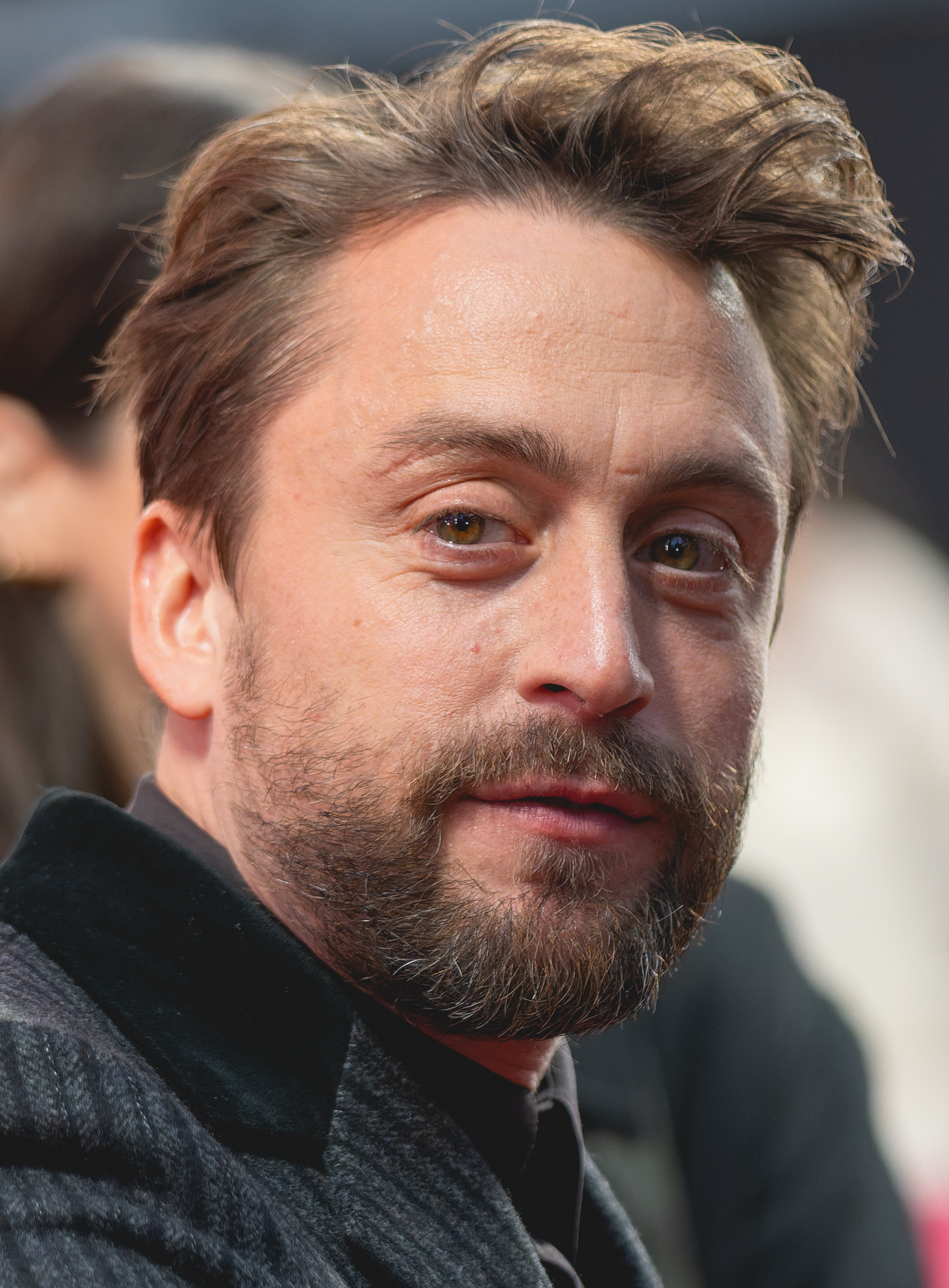
Kieran Culkin won for A Real Pain (2024).

=== 1960s ===
Year	Actor	Role(s)	Film	Ref.
**1968** (22nd)	**Ian Holm**	**The Bofors Gun**	**Flynn**	
**1968** (22nd)	Anthony Hopkins	The Lion in Winter	King Richard I	
**1968** (22nd)	John McEnery	Romeo and Juliet	Mercutio	
**1968** (22nd)	George Segal	No Way to Treat a Lady	Morris Brummel	
**1969** (23rd)	**Laurence Olivier**	**Oh! What a Lovely War**	**John French**	
**1969** (23rd)	Jack Klugman	Goodbye, Columbus	Ben Patimkin	
**1969** (23rd)	Jack Nicholson	Easy Rider	George Hanson	
**1969** (23rd)	Robert Vaughn	Bullitt	Chalmers	

=== 1970s ===
Year	Actor	Role(s)	Film	Ref.
**1970** (24th)	**Colin Welland**	**Kes**	**Mr. Farthing**	
**1970** (24th)	Bernard Cribbins	The Railway Children	Albert Perks	
**1970** (24th)	John Mills †	Ryan's Daughter	Michael	
**1970** (24th)	Gig Young †	They Shoot Horses, Don't They?	Rocky	
**1971** (25th)	**Edward Fox**	**The Go-Between**	**Hugh Trimingham**	
**1971** (25th)	Michael Gough	The Go-Between	Mr. Maudsley	
**1971** (25th)	Ian Hendry	Get Carter	Eric Paice	
**1971** (25th)	John Hurt	10 Rillington Place	Timothy Evans	
**1972** (26th)	**Ben Johnson** †	**The Last Picture Show**	**Sam the Lion**	
**1972** (26th)	Max Adrian (posthumous)	The Boy Friend	Mr. Max / Lord Hubert Brockhurst	
**1972** (26th)	Robert Duvall	The Godfather	Tom Hagen	
**1972** (26th)	Ralph Richardson	Lady Caroline Lamb	King George IV	
**1973** (27th)	**Arthur Lowe**	**O Lucky Man!**	**Mr. Duff / Charlie Johnson / Dr. Munda**	
**1973** (27th)	Ian Bannen	The Offence	Kenneth Baxter	
**1973** (27th)	Denholm Elliott	A Doll's House	Nils Krogstad	
**1973** (27th)	Michael Lonsdale	The Day of the Jackal	Lebel	
**1974** (28th)	**John Gielgud**	**Murder on the Orient Express**	**Mr. Beddoes**	
**1974** (28th)	Adam Faith	Stardust	Mike Menary	
**1974** (28th)	John Huston	Chinatown	Noah Cross	
**1974** (28th)	Randy Quaid	The Last Detail	Seaman Larry Meadows	
**1975** (29th)	**Fred Astaire**	**The Towering Inferno**	**Harlee Claiborne**	
**1975** (29th)	Martin Balsam	The Taking of Pelham One Two Three	Harold Longman	
**1975** (29th)	Burgess Meredith	The Day of the Locust	Harry Greener	
**1975** (29th)	Jack Warden	Shampoo	Lester Carp	
**1976** (30th)	**Brad Dourif**	**One Flew Over the Cuckoo's Nest**	**Billy Bibbit**	
**1976** (30th)	Martin Balsam	All the President's Men	Howard Simons	
**1976** (30th)	Michael Hordern	The Slipper and the Rose	The King	
**1976** (30th)	Jason Robards †	All the President's Men	Ben Bradlee	
**1977** (31st)	**Edward Fox**	**A Bridge Too Far**	**Brian Horrocks**	
**1977** (31st)	Colin Blakely	Equus	Frank Strang	
**1977** (31st)	Robert Duvall	Network	Frank Hackett	
**1977** (31st)	Zero Mostel	The Front	Hecky Brown	
**1978** (32nd)	**John Hurt**	**Midnight Express**	**Max** '	
**1978** (32nd)	Gene Hackman	Superman	Lex Luthor	
**1978** (32nd)	Jason Robards †	Julia	Dashiell Hammett	
**1978** (32nd)	François Truffaut	Close Encounters of the Third Kind	Claude Lacombe	
**1979** (33rd)	**Robert Duvall**	**Apocalypse Now**	**Bill Kilgore**	
**1979** (33rd)	Denholm Elliott	Saint Jack	William Leigh	
**1979** (33rd)	John Hurt	Alien	Kane	
**1979** (33rd)	Christopher Walken †	The Deer Hunter	Nikanor "Nick" Chevotarevich	

=== 1980s ===
Year	Actor	Role(s)	Film	Ref.
**1980** (34th)	**Not awarded**			
**1981** (35th)	**Ian Holm**	**Chariots of Fire**	**Sam Mussabini**	
**1981** (35th)	Denholm Elliott	Raiders of the Lost Ark	Marcus Brody	
**1981** (35th)	John Gielgud †	Arthur	Hobson	
**1981** (35th)	Nigel Havers	Chariots of Fire	Andrew Lindsay	
**1982** (36th)	**Jack Nicholson**	**Reds**	**Eugene O'Neill**	
**1982** (36th)	Frank Finlay	The Return of the Soldier	William Grey	
**1982** (36th)	Edward Fox	Gandhi	Reginald Dyer	
**1982** (36th)	Roshan Seth	Gandhi	Jawaharlal Nehru	
**1983** (37th)	**Denholm Elliott**	**Trading Places**	**Coleman**	
**1983** (37th)	Bob Hoskins	The Honorary Consul	Colonel Perez	
**1983** (37th)	Burt Lancaster	Local Hero	Felix Happer	
**1983** (37th)	Jerry Lewis	The King of Comedy	Jerry Langford	
**1984** (38th)	**Denholm Elliott**	**A Private Function**	**Charles Swaby**	
**1984** (38th)	Michael Elphick	Gorky Park	Pasha	
**1984** (38th)	Ian Holm	Greystoke: The Legend of Tarzan, Lord of the Apes	Phillippe D'Arnot	
**1984** (38th)	Ralph Richardson	Greystoke: The Legend of Tarzan, Lord of the Apes	The Earl of Greystoke	
**1985** (39th)	**Denholm Elliott**	**Defence of the Realm**	**Vernon Bayliss**	
**1985** (39th)	James Fox	A Passage to India	Richard Fielding	
**1985** (39th)	John Gielgud	Plenty	Leonard Darwin	
**1985** (39th)	Saeed Jaffrey	My Beautiful Laundrette	Nasser	
**1986** (40th)	**Ray McAnally**	**The Mission**	**Altamirano**	
**1986** (40th)	Klaus Maria Brandauer	Out of Africa	Bror Blixen	
**1986** (40th)	Simon Callow	A Room with a View	Arthur Beebe	
**1986** (40th)	Denholm Elliott	A Room with a View	Mr. Emerson	
**1987** (41st)	**Daniel Auteuil**	**Jean de Florette**	**Ugolin**	
**1987** (41st)	Ian Bannen	Hope and Glory	Grandfather George	
**1987** (41st)	Sean Connery †	The Untouchables	Jimmy Malone	
**1987** (41st)	John Thaw	Cry Freedom	Kruger	
**1988** (42nd)	**Michael Palin**	**A Fish Called Wanda**	**Ken Pile**	
**1988** (42nd)	Joss Ackland	White Mischief	Jock Delves Broughton	
**1988** (42nd)	Peter O'Toole	The Last Emperor	Reginald Johnston	
**1988** (42nd)	David Suchet	A World Apart	Muller	
**1989** (43rd)	**Ray McAnally**	**My Left Foot**	**Mr. Brown**	
**1989** (43rd)	Marlon Brando	A Dry White Season	Ian McKenzie	
**1989** (43rd)	Sean Connery	Indiana Jones and the Last Crusade	Henry Jones Sr.	
**1989** (43rd)	Jack Nicholson	Batman	Jack Napier / The Joker	

=== 1990s ===
Year	Actor	Role(s)	Film	Ref.
**1990** (44th)	**Salvatore Cascio**	**Cinema Paradiso**	**Salvatore Di Vita (child)**	
**1990** (44th)	Alan Alda	Crimes and Misdemeanors	Lester	
**1990** (44th)	John Hurt	The Field	Bird O'Donnell	
**1990** (44th)	Al Pacino	Dick Tracy	Alphonse "Big Boy" Caprice	
**1991** (45th)	**Alan Rickman**	**Robin Hood: Prince of Thieves**	**Sheriff of Nottingham**	
**1991** (45th)	Alan Bates	Hamlet	King Claudius	
**1991** (45th)	Derek Jacobi	Dead Again	Franklyn Madson	
**1991** (45th)	Andrew Strong	The Commitments	Deco Cuffe	
**1992** (46th)	**Gene Hackman** †	**Unforgiven**	**Little Bill Daggett**	
**1992** (46th)	Jaye Davidson	The Crying Game	Dil	
**1992** (46th)	Tommy Lee Jones	JFK	Clay Shaw	
**1992** (46th)	Samuel West	Howards End	Leonard Bast	
**1993** (47th)	**Ralph Fiennes**	**Schindler's List**	**Amon Göth**	
**1993** (47th)	Tommy Lee Jones	The Fugitive	Deputy U.S. Marshal Samuel Gerard	
**1993** (47th)	Ben Kingsley	Schindler's List	Itzhak Stern	
**1993** (47th)	John Malkovich	In the Line of Fire	Mitch Leary	
**1994** (48th)	**Samuel L. Jackson**	**Pulp Fiction**	**Jules Winnfield**	
**1994** (48th)	Simon Callow	Four Weddings and a Funeral	Gareth	
**1994** (48th)	John Hannah	Four Weddings and a Funeral	Matthew	
**1994** (48th)	Paul Scofield	Quiz Show	Mark Van Doren	
**1995** (49th)	**Tim Roth**	**Rob Roy**	**Archibald Cunningham**	
**1995** (49th)	Ian Holm	The Madness of King George	Dr. Willis	
**1995** (49th)	Martin Landau †	Ed Wood	Bela Lugosi	
**1995** (49th)	Alan Rickman	Sense and Sensibility	Christopher Brandon	
**1996** (50th)	**Paul Scofield**	**The Crucible**	**Thomas Danforth**	
**1996** (50th)	John Gielgud	Shine	Cecil Parkes	
**1996** (50th)	Edward Norton	Primal Fear	Aaron Stampler	
**1996** (50th)	Alan Rickman	Michael Collins	Éamon de Valera	
**1997** (51st)	**Tom Wilkinson**	**The Full Monty**	**Gerald Arthur Cooper**	
**1997** (51st)	Mark Addy	The Full Monty	Dave Horsfall	
**1997** (51st)	Rupert Everett	My Best Friend's Wedding	George Downes	
**1997** (51st)	Burt Reynolds	Boogie Nights	Jack Horner	
**1998** (52nd)	**Geoffrey Rush**	**Shakespeare in Love**	**Philip Henslowe**	
**1998** (52nd)	Ed Harris	The Truman Show	Christof	
**1998** (52nd)	Geoffrey Rush	Elizabeth	Francis Walsingham	
**1998** (52nd)	Tom Wilkinson	Shakespeare in Love	Hugh Fennyman	
**1999** (53rd)	**Jude Law**	**The Talented Mr. Ripley**	**Dickie Greenleaf**	
**1999** (53rd)	Wes Bentley	American Beauty	Ricky Fitts	
**1999** (53rd)	Michael Caine †	The Cider House Rules	Wilbur Larch	
**1999** (53rd)	Rhys Ifans	Notting Hill	Spike	
**1999** (53rd)	Timothy Spall	Topsy-Turvy	Richard Temple	

=== 2000s ===
Year	Actor	Role(s)	Film	Ref.
**2000** (54th)	**Benicio del Toro** †	**Traffic**	**Javier Rodriguez**	
**2000** (54th)	Albert Finney	Erin Brockovich	Edward L. Masry	
**2000** (54th)	Gary Lewis	Billy Elliot	Jackie Elliot	
**2000** (54th)	Joaquin Phoenix	Gladiator	Commodus	
**2000** (54th)	Oliver Reed (posthumous)	Gladiator	Proximo	
**2001** (55th)	**Jim Broadbent**	**Moulin Rouge!**	**Harold Zidler**	
**2001** (55th)	Hugh Bonneville	Iris	Young John Bayley	
**2001** (55th)	Robbie Coltrane	Harry Potter and the Philosopher's Stone	Rubeus Hagrid	
**2001** (55th)	Colin Firth	Bridget Jones's Diary	Mark Darcy	
**2001** (55th)	Eddie Murphy ^{[A]}	Shrek	Donkey	
**2002** (56th)	**Christopher Walken**	**Catch Me If You Can**	**Frank Abagnale Sr.**	
**2002** (56th)	Chris Cooper †	Adaptation	John Laroche	
**2002** (56th)	Ed Harris	The Hours	Richard Brown	
**2002** (56th)	Alfred Molina	Frida	Diego Rivera	
**2002** (56th)	Paul Newman	Road to Perdition	John Rooney	
**2003** (57th)	**Bill Nighy**	**Love Actually**	**Billy Mack**	
**2003** (57th)	Paul Bettany	Master and Commander: The Far Side of the World	Dr. Stephen Maturin	
**2003** (57th)	Albert Finney	Big Fish	Ed Bloom (Old)	
**2003** (57th)	Ian McKellen	The Lord of the Rings: The Return of the King	Gandalf	
**2003** (57th)	Tim Robbins †	Mystic River	Dave Boyle	
**2004** (58th)	**Clive Owen**	**Closer**	**Larry Gray**	
**2004** (58th)	Alan Alda	The Aviator	Owen Brewster	
**2004** (58th)	Phil Davis	Vera Drake	Stanley Drake	
**2004** (58th)	Rodrigo de la Serna	The Motorcycle Diaries	Alberto Granado	
**2004** (58th)	Jamie Foxx	Collateral	Max Durocher	
**2005** (59th)	**Jake Gyllenhaal**	**Brokeback Mountain**	**Jack Twist**	
**2005** (59th)	Don Cheadle	Crash	Det. Graham Waters	
**2005** (59th)	George Clooney †	Good Night, and Good Luck	Fred W. Friendly	
**2005** (59th)	George Clooney †	Syriana †	Bob Barnes	
**2005** (59th)	Matt Dillon	Crash	Sgt. John Ryan	
**2006** (60th)	**Alan Arkin** †	**Little Miss Sunshine**	**Edwin Hoover**	
**2006** (60th)	James McAvoy	The Last King of Scotland	Dr. Nicholas Garrigan	
**2006** (60th)	Jack Nicholson	The Departed	Frank Costello	
**2006** (60th)	Leslie Phillips	Venus	Ian Brooks	
**2006** (60th)	Michael Sheen	The Queen	Tony Blair	
**2007** (61st)	**Javier Bardem** †	**No Country for Old Men**	**Anton Chigurh**	
**2007** (61st)	Paul Dano	There Will Be Blood	Eli Sunday / Paul Sunday	
**2007** (61st)	Philip Seymour Hoffman	Charlie Wilson's War	Gust Avrakotos	
**2007** (61st)	Tommy Lee Jones	No Country for Old Men	Sheriff Ed Tom Bell	
**2007** (61st)	Tom Wilkinson	Michael Clayton	Arthur Edens	
**2008** (62nd)	**Heath Ledger** † (posthumous)	**The Dark Knight**	**Joker**	
**2008** (62nd)	Robert Downey Jr.	Tropic Thunder	Kirk Lazarus	
**2008** (62nd)	Brendan Gleeson	In Bruges	Ken Daley	
**2008** (62nd)	Philip Seymour Hoffman	Doubt	Father Brendan Flynn	
**2008** (62nd)	Brad Pitt	Burn After Reading	Chad Feldheimer	
**2009** (63rd)	**Christoph Waltz** †	**Inglourious Basterds**	**Hans Landa**	
**2009** (63rd)	Alec Baldwin	It's Complicated	Jacob Adler	
**2009** (63rd)	Christian McKay	Me and Orson Welles	Orson Welles	
**2009** (63rd)	Alfred Molina	An Education	Jack Miller	
**2009** (63rd)	Stanley Tucci	The Lovely Bones	George Harvey	

=== 2010s ===
Year	Actor	Role(s)	Film	Ref.
**2010** (64th)	**Geoffrey Rush**	**The King's Speech**	**Lionel Logue**	
**2010** (64th)	Christian Bale †	The Fighter	Dicky Eklund	
**2010** (64th)	Andrew Garfield	The Social Network	Eduardo Saverin	
**2010** (64th)	Pete Postlethwaite (posthumous)	The Town	Fergus "Fergie" Colm	
**2010** (64th)	Mark Ruffalo	The Kids Are All Right	Paul Hatfield	
**2011** (65th)	**Christopher Plummer** †	**Beginners**	**Hal Fields**	
**2011** (65th)	Kenneth Branagh	My Week with Marilyn	Laurence Olivier	
**2011** (65th)	Jim Broadbent	The Iron Lady	Denis Thatcher	
**2011** (65th)	Jonah Hill	Moneyball	Peter Brand	
**2011** (65th)	Philip Seymour Hoffman	The Ides of March	Paul Zara	
**2012** (66th)	**Christoph Waltz** †	**Django Unchained**	**Dr. King Schultz**	
**2012** (66th)	Alan Arkin	Argo	Lester Siegel	
**2012** (66th)	Javier Bardem	Skyfall	Raoul Silva	
**2012** (66th)	Philip Seymour Hoffman	The Master	Lancaster Dodd	
**2012** (66th)	Tommy Lee Jones	Lincoln	Thaddeus Stevens	
**2013** (67th)	**Barkhad Abdi**	**Captain Phillips**	**Abduwali Muse**	
**2013** (67th)	Daniel Brühl	Rush	Niki Lauda	
**2013** (67th)	Bradley Cooper	American Hustle	Richard "Richie" DiMaso	
**2013** (67th)	Matt Damon	Behind the Candelabra	Scott Thorson	
**2013** (67th)	Michael Fassbender	12 Years a Slave	Edwin Epps	
**2014** (68th)	**J. K. Simmons** †	**Whiplash**	**Terrence Fletcher**	
**2014** (68th)	Steve Carell	Foxcatcher	John du Pont	
**2014** (68th)	Ethan Hawke	Boyhood	Mason Evans Sr.	
**2014** (68th)	Edward Norton	Birdman	Mike Shiner	
**2014** (68th)	Mark Ruffalo	Foxcatcher	David Schultz	
**2015** (69th)	**Mark Rylance** †	**Bridge of Spies**	**Rudolf Abel**	
**2015** (69th)	Christian Bale	The Big Short	Michael Burry	
**2015** (69th)	Benicio del Toro	Sicario	Alejandro Gillick	
**2015** (69th)	Idris Elba	Beasts of No Nation	The Commandant	
**2015** (69th)	Mark Ruffalo	Spotlight	Michael Rezendes	
**2016** (70th)	**Dev Patel**	**Lion**	**Saroo Brierley**	
**2016** (70th)	Mahershala Ali †	Moonlight	Juan	
**2016** (70th)	Jeff Bridges	Hell or High Water	Marcus Hamilton	
**2016** (70th)	Hugh Grant	Florence Foster Jenkins	St. Clair Bayfield	
**2016** (70th)	Aaron Taylor-Johnson	Nocturnal Animals	Ray Marcus	
**2017** (71st)	**Sam Rockwell** †	**Three Billboards Outside Ebbing, Missouri**	**Jason Dixon**	
**2017** (71st)	Willem Dafoe	The Florida Project	Bobby Hicks	
**2017** (71st)	Hugh Grant	Paddington 2	Phoenix Buchanan	
**2017** (71st)	Woody Harrelson	Three Billboards Outside Ebbing, Missouri	Bill Willoughby	
**2017** (71st)	Christopher Plummer	All the Money in the World	J. Paul Getty	
**2018** (72nd)	**Mahershala Ali** †	**Green Book**	**Don Shirley**	
**2018** (72nd)	Timothée Chalamet	Beautiful Boy	Nic Sheff	
**2018** (72nd)	Adam Driver	BlacKkKlansman	Philip "Flip" Zimmerman	
**2018** (72nd)	Richard E. Grant	Can You Ever Forgive Me?	Jack Hock	
**2018** (72nd)	Sam Rockwell	Vice	George W. Bush	
**2019** (73rd)	**Brad Pitt** †	**Once Upon a Time in Hollywood**	**Cliff Booth**	
**2019** (73rd)	Tom Hanks	A Beautiful Day in the Neighborhood	Fred Rogers	
**2019** (73rd)	Anthony Hopkins	The Two Popes	Pope Benedict XVI	
**2019** (73rd)	Al Pacino	The Irishman	Jimmy Hoffa	
**2019** (73rd)	Joe Pesci	The Irishman	Russell Bufalino	

=== 2020s ===
Year	Actor	Role(s)	Film	Ref.
**2020** (74th)	**Daniel Kaluuya** †	**Judas and the Black Messiah**	**Fred Hampton**	
**2020** (74th)	Barry Keoghan	Calm with Horses	Dymphna Devers	
**2020** (74th)	Alan Kim	Minari	David Yi	
**2020** (74th)	Leslie Odom Jr.	One Night in Miami...	Sam Cooke	
**2020** (74th)	Clarke Peters	Da 5 Bloods	Otis	
**2020** (74th)	Paul Raci	Sound of Metal	Joe	
**2021** (75th)	**Troy Kotsur** †	**CODA**	**Frank Rossi**	
**2021** (75th)	Mike Faist	West Side Story	Riff	
**2021** (75th)	Ciarán Hinds	Belfast	Pop	
**2021** (75th)	Woody Norman	C'mon C'mon	Jesse	
**2021** (75th)	Jesse Plemons	The Power of the Dog	George Burbank	
**2021** (75th)	Kodi Smit-McPhee	The Power of the Dog	Peter Gordon	
**2022** (76th)	**Barry Keoghan**	**The Banshees of Inisherin**	**Dominic Kearney**	
**2022** (76th)	Brendan Gleeson	The Banshees of Inisherin	Colm Doherty	
**2022** (76th)	Ke Huy Quan †	Everything Everywhere All at Once	Waymond Wang	
**2022** (76th)	Eddie Redmayne	The Good Nurse	Charles Cullen	
**2022** (76th)	Albrecht Schuch	All Quiet on the Western Front	Stanislaus "Kat" Katczinsky	
**2022** (76th)	Micheal Ward	Empire of Light	Stephen Murray	
**2023** (77th)	**Robert Downey Jr.** †	**Oppenheimer**	**Lewis Strauss**	
**2023** (77th)	Robert De Niro	Killers of the Flower Moon	William Hale	
**2023** (77th)	Jacob Elordi	Saltburn	Felix Catton	
**2023** (77th)	Ryan Gosling	Barbie	Ken	
**2023** (77th)	Paul Mescal	All of Us Strangers	Harry	
**2023** (77th)	Dominic Sessa	The Holdovers	Angus Tully	
**2024** (78th)	**Kieran Culkin** †	**A Real Pain**	**Benji Kaplan**	
**2024** (78th)	Yura Borisov	Anora	Igor	
**2024** (78th)	Clarence Maclin	Sing Sing	Himself	
**2024** (78th)	Edward Norton	A Complete Unknown	Pete Seeger	
**2024** (78th)	Guy Pearce	The Brutalist	Harrison Lee Van Buren	
**2024** (78th)	Jeremy Strong	The Apprentice	Roy Cohn	
**2025** (79th)	**Sean Penn** †	**One Battle After Another**	**Col. Steven J. Lockjaw**	
**2025** (79th)	Benicio del Toro	One Battle After Another	Sensei Sergio St. Carlos	
**2025** (79th)	Jacob Elordi	Frankenstein	The Creature	
**2025** (79th)	Paul Mescal	Hamnet	William Shakespeare	
**2025** (79th)	Peter Mullan	I Swear	Tommy Trotter	
**2025** (79th)	Stellan Skarsgård	Sentimental Value	Gustav Borg	

== Multiple wins and nominations ==
=== Multiple nominations ===
7 nominations

- Denholm Elliott

4 nominations

- John Gielgud
- Philip Seymour Hoffman
- Ian Holm
- John Hurt
- Tommy Lee Jones
- Jack Nicholson

3 nominations

- Benicio del Toro
- Robert Duvall
- Edward Fox
- Edward Norton
- Alan Rickman
- Mark Ruffalo
- Geoffrey Rush
- Tom Wilkinson

2 nominations

- Alan Alda
- Mahershala Ali
- Alan Arkin
- Christian Bale
- Martin Balsam
- Ian Bannen
- Javier Bardem
- Jim Broadbent
- Simon Callow
- George Clooney
- Sean Connery
- Robert Downey Jr.
- Jacob Elordi
- Albert Finney
- Brendan Gleeson
- Hugh Grant
- Gene Hackman
- Ed Harris
- Anthony Hopkins
- Barry Keoghan
- Ray McAnally
- Paul Mescal
- Alfred Molina
- Al Pacino
- Brad Pitt
- Christopher Plummer
- Ralph Richardson
- Jason Robards
- Sam Rockwell
- Paul Scofield
- Christopher Walken
- Christoph Waltz

=== Multiple wins ===
3 wins

- Denholm Elliott (3 consecutive)

2 wins

- Edward Fox
- Ian Holm
- Ray McAnally
- Geoffrey Rush
- Christoph Waltz

== See also ==
- Academy Award for Best Supporting Actor
- Actor Award for Outstanding Performance by a Male Actor in a Supporting Role
- Critics' Choice Movie Award for Best Supporting Actor
- Golden Globe Award for Best Supporting Actor – Motion Picture
- Independent Spirit Award for Best Supporting Performance
- Lists of acting awards
- List of awards for supporting actor

== Notes ==
A: Eddie Murphy was nominated for a voice-only performance.
