= Church of St James, Chilton Cantelo =

Church in Somerset, England

Church of St James
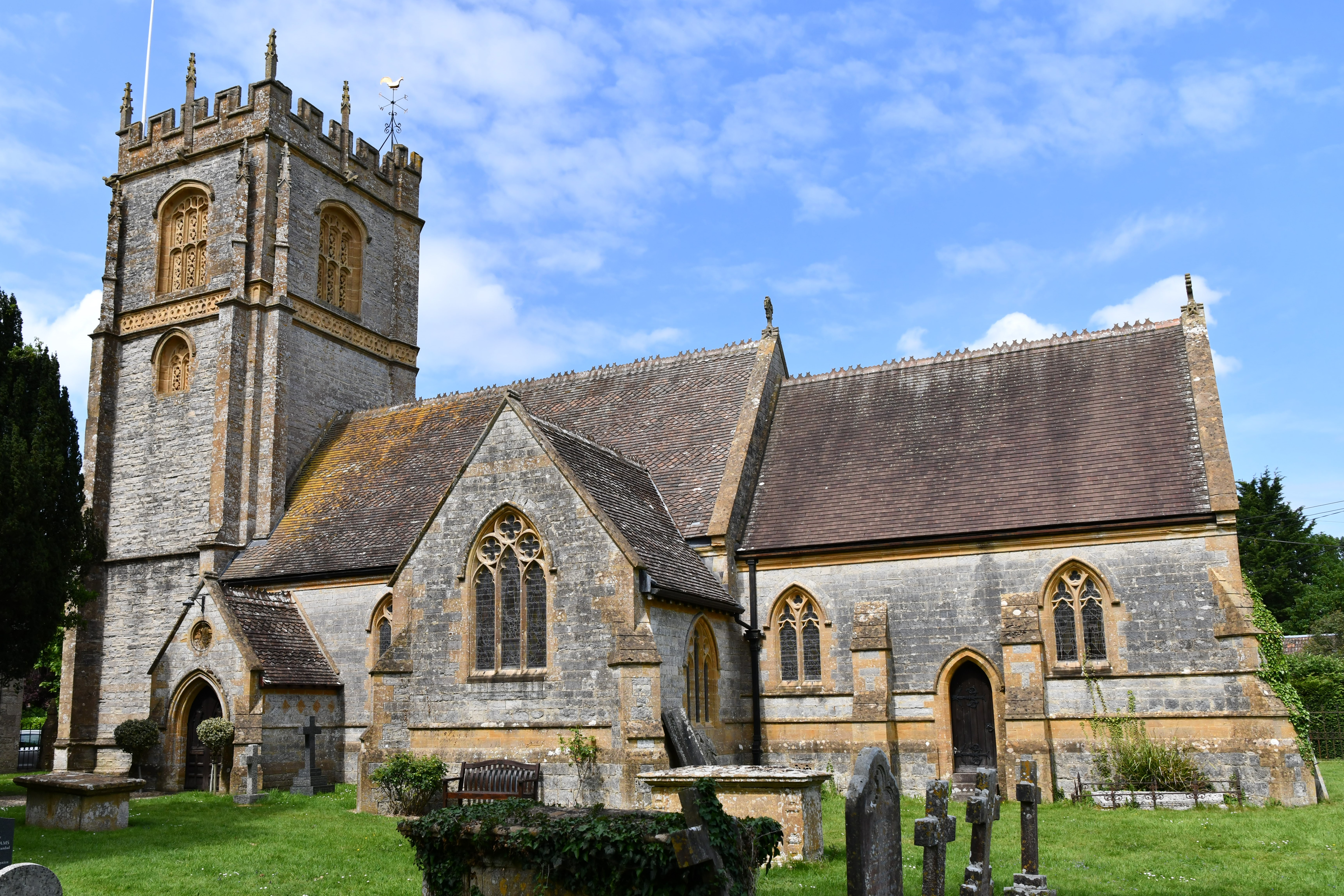
- Church of St James in 2026

- Location within Somerset
- 50.9974°N 2.6138°W
- Location: Chilton Cantelo, Somerset, England

History
- Built: 15th century

Listed Building – Grade II*
- Official name: Church of St James
- Designated: 19 April 1961
- Reference no.: 1056835

The Anglican Church of St James in Chilton Cantelo, Somerset, England was built in the 15th century. It is a Grade II* listed building.

== History ==
The church has a 15th-century tower and parts of the church date from even earlier. It was restored in 1864–65 by Sir Arthur Blomfield, while Charles Old Goodford was the incumbent.

The parish is part of a benefice with Ashington, Mudford and Rimpton within the Diocese of Bath and Wells.

== Architecture ==
The stone building has hamstone dressing and clay tile roofs. It consists of a three-bay nave and three-bay chancel with a south porch. The three-stage west tower is supported by corner buttresses and has a small stair turret with a weathercock. The tower has five bells the oldest of which was cast in the 17th century.

Inside the church are a 12th-century font and early piscina. The circular font is made of hamstone is lead lined and is 0.9 metres (2 ft 11 in) in diameter. There is a wall tablet which is a memorial to Lieutenant Charles Goodford who died in World War I.

Theophilus Brome, who died in 1670, had his body buried in the church, however his skull was separated from the body on his instructions and is kept in a cupboard at Higher Chilton Farm. According to writer Daniel Codd, who observed the skull in February 2010: 'Upon being shown Theophilus' skull, I was curious to see his lower jaw was missing and that he appears at some stage to have been varnished.' Codd goes on to say, 'The reason for Theophilus Brome's desire that his head be hidden was very natural, given the era in which he died, and his tomb in the church is concealed beneath the church wall nearest the farm — meaning that his head and body were buried apart, but as near to each other as was possible under the circumstances.' Several attempts to inter the skull have resulted in terrible and unexplained noises being heard throughout the farmhouse.

== See also ==
- List of ecclesiastical parishes in the Diocese of Bath and Wells
