= Chilton Cantelo School =

Private school in Somerset, England

Location
- Chilton Cantelo; Yeovil, Somerset, BA22 8BG; England; 50.9981°N 2.6102°W

Information
- Type: Private boarding & day school
- Motto: Carpe diem (Seize the day)
- Established: 1959
- Closed: 2016
- Department for Education URN: 123937 Tables
- Staff: 54
- Gender: Mixed
- Age: 4 to 18
- Enrolment: 286 as of February 2016
- Colour: Maroon

Chilton Cantelo School was a small profit-making mixed private school located in the village of Chilton Cantelo (near Yeovil and Sherborne) in Somerset, England. The school was briefly owned and operated by the Cognita Group.

Set on 25 acres (10 ha) of grounds, an 18th-century manor house housed the school. It accepted pupils between the ages of 4 and 18. The school had boarding places for up to 220 of its pupils, with day pupils offered 'flexi-boarding' when needed. Class sizes were typically small.

Chilton Cantelo School was a member of the Independent Schools Association, the Independent Schools Council and the Boarding Schools Association. In July 2016, Cognita closed the school, making staff redundant, because of a fall in admissions since 2007.

Chilton Cantelo became home to The Park School, prior to The Park School's closure.

== Notable former pupils ==
- Gareth Forwood (1945–2007), actor
