= Chilton Cantelo =

Village and civil parish in Somerset, England

Coordinates: 51°00′01″N 2°36′25″W

- Village and civil parish
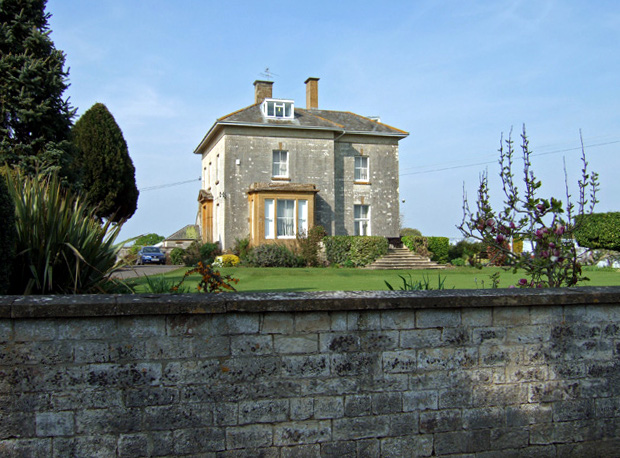
- The Cypress House

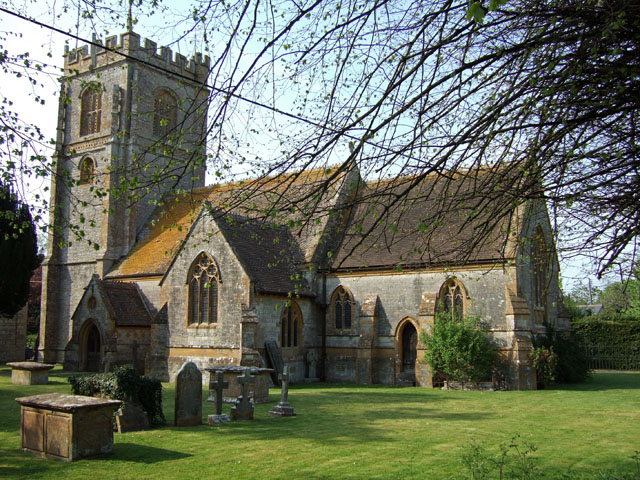
- The Parish Church of St James

- Location within Somerset
- Population: 445 (2011)
- OS grid reference: ST575225
- Unitary authority: Somerset Council
- Ceremonial county: Somerset
- Region: South West
- Country: England
- Sovereign state: United Kingdom
- Post town: YEOVIL
- Postcode district: BA22
- Dialling code: 01935
- Police: Avon and Somerset
- Fire: Devon and Somerset
- Ambulance: South Western
- UK Parliament: Glastonbury and Somerton

Chilton Cantelo is a village and parish in Somerset, England, situated on the River Yeo 5 miles (8 km) north of Yeovil and 4 miles (6 km) east of Ilchester in the South Somerset district. The village has a population of 445. The parish also includes the village of Ashington.

== History ==
The first part of the name Chilton means the young nobleman's settlement, and the second is from William de Cantilupe (or Cantelo) and his descendants who held the manor between 1201 and 1350. The manor was acquired in the 18th century by the Goodford family who built Chilton Cantelo house which later became the home of Chilton Cantelo School, a small private boarding school which was owned and operated by the Cognita Group. In 2017 the school was purchased by The Park School, Yeovil which relocated to the Chilton site. This school closed in 2020.

Ashington Manor has pre Norman Conquest origins, and was in the overlordship of Glastonbury Abbey, but the present building is from the 15th century. The families who held the manor include de Curcelle, and from 1390 to 1901 the St. Barbes, becoming St. Barbe Syenha from 1722. In 1940 it passed to the Church Commissioners.

The parish of Chilton Cantelo was part of the hundred of Houndsborough, while Ashington was part of the Stone Hundred.

== Governance ==
The parish council has responsibility for local issues, including setting an annual precept (local rate) to cover the council's operating costs and producing annual accounts for public scrutiny. The parish council evaluates local planning applications and works with the local police, district council officers, and neighbourhood watch groups on matters of crime, security, and traffic. The parish council's role also includes initiating projects for the maintenance and repair of parish facilities, as well as consulting with the district council on the maintenance, repair, and improvement of highways, drainage, footpaths, public transport, and street cleaning. Conservation matters (including trees and listed buildings) and environmental issues are also the responsibility of the council.

For local government purposes, since 1 April 2023, the parish comes under the unitary authority of Somerset Council. Prior to this, it was part of the non-metropolitan district of South Somerset (established under the Local Government Act 1972). It was part of Yeovil Rural District before 1974.

It is also part of the Glastonbury and Somerton county constituency represented in the House of Commons of the Parliament of the United Kingdom. It elects one Member of Parliament (MP) by the first past the post system of election.

== Religious sites ==
The Church of Saint Vincent, in Ashington, is from the 13th century.

The Norman Church of St James. It has a 15th-century tower and parts of the church date from even earlier. It was restored in 1864–65 by Sir Arthur Blomfield. It has been designated by English Heritage as a Grade II* listed building. Theophilus Brome, who died in 1670, had his body buried in the church, however his skull was separated from the body on his instructions and is kept in a cupboard at Higher Chilton Farm. According to writer Daniel Codd, who observed the skull in February 2010: "Upon being shown Theophilus' skull, I was curious to see his lower jaw was missing and that he appears at some stage to have been varnished." Codd goes on to say, "The reason for Theophilus Brome's desire that his head be hidden was very natural, given the era in which he died, and his tomb in the church is concealed beneath the church wall nearest the farm — meaning that his head and body were buried apart, but as near to each other as was possible under the circumstances." Several attempts to inter the skull have resulted in terrible and unexplained noises being heard throughout the farmhouse.

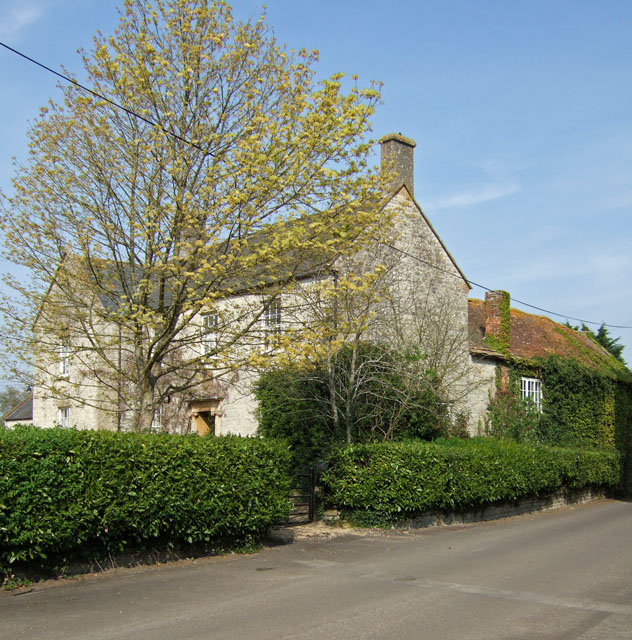
Higher Farm

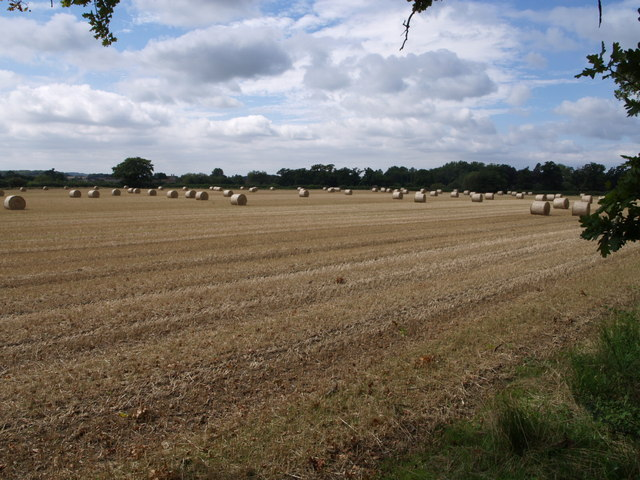
Bales near Chilton Cantelo

== See also ==
- Bettiscombe
- Burton Agnes Hall
- Screaming skull
