= Late Night Theatre =

British television anthology series

Late Night Theatre is a British television anthology series produced by Granada Television, Scottish Television (STV), Southern Television, and Westward Television. Forty-four episodes were aired on ITV (TV network) from 1972–1974. Among its guest stars were Michael Kitchen and Zoe Wanamaker.
