= Henry Watson Barnard =

English cricketer (1792–1855)

Henry Barnard
Personal information
- Full name: Henry Watson Barnard
- Born: 10 January 1792; Chislehurst, Kent
- Died: 9 July 1855 (aged 63); Granada, Spain
- Relatives: Edward Barnard (grandfather); John Barnard (brother); George Barnard (brother)

Domestic team information
- Years: Team
- 1815–1823: Kent
- FC debut: 17 July 1815 Kent v England
- Last FC: 28 July 1823 Kent v Marylebone Cricket Club (MCC)
- Source: CricInfo, 19 June 2022

Reverend Henry Watson Barnard (10 January 1792 – 9 July 1855) was an English clergyman and amateur cricketer who played between 1815 and 1823. He served in the Church of England in Somerset and was a canon of Wells Cathedral.

== Early and professional life ==
Barnard was born at Chislehurst in Kent in 1792, the son of the Edward and Mary Ann Barnard (née Beadon). His father served in the West Kent troop of the Yeomanry Cavalry at Chislehurst from their formation in 1793 before being ordained in the Church of England in 1797. Barnard's grandfather, also Edward, was a clergyman who had been a fellow of St John's College, Cambridge and was the Headmaster of Eton College between 1754 and 1765 and the College Provost from 1765 until his death in 1781. Barnard's mother Mary Ann was the daughter of Edward Beadon, the vicar of St Nicolas Church, North Stoneham in Hampshire. She married his father, who had also attended St John's, in 1784. (Note: Barnard's father held a number of appointments in the Church. He died at Alverstoke in Hampshire, where he had been vicar since 1825, in 1840. Despite his father being Provost and having been Headmaster, he did not attend Eton, instead being privately educated.)

Along with his three brothers, Barnard was educated at Eton. He went up to St John's, Cambridge in 1811, graduating in 1815. He was ordained and appointed as the Vicar of Pilton in Somerset in 1816. In 1826 he moved to become the Vicar of Compton Bishop, before serving as the Vicar of Yatton between 1830 and 1846. From 1817 until his death in 1855 he was Prebendary of Wells Cathedral and from 1833 to 1855 was the Rector of St Cuthbert's Church, Wells and a Canon of Wells Cathedral. He also served as a Justice of the Peace.

== Cricket ==
Barnard played cricket at school and was in the Eton team for the inaugural Eton v Harrow match in 1805. He played in five matches between 1815 and 1823, making his important debut for Kent against England (i.e., the "rest" of England) in 1815 at Wrotham Napps, playing alongside his brother John Barnard who also made his debut in the same match. He played for Old Etonians against the Gentlemen of England in 1816 and 1817 and for Marylebone Cricket Club (MCC) against Hampshire in 1818. His final important match was at Chislehurst Common for Kent against MCC in 1823. He scored a total of 76 runs, with his highest score of 40 made for Old Etonians in 1817. He also took five wickets (Note: In the period Barnard played, wickets taken by bowlers were normally only recorded if they were bowled. Other means of dismissal were not credited to any bowler. As a result the number of wickets he took is uncertain, with the total of five being a minimum.) in his five important matches, four of them in the same match for Old Etonians.

John Barnard played in a total of 18 important matches and was President of MCC in 1829–30. Another of Barnard's brothers, George, also played important cricket, playing twice for Cambridge University in 1825 and 1826, having captained Eton whilst at school. (Note: Barnard's oldest brother Charles is not known to have played. He lived between 1790 and 1878 and after attending Eton and St John's, Cambridge was the British Chargé d'affaires at Coburg from 1842.)

== Family ==
In 1819 Barnard married Eleanor Clerk, the daughter of Major Thomas Clerk of Westholme House, Pilton. His father-in-law had served in the East India Company Army and purchased the house in 1800. The couple had five children, three daughters and two sons. One of their sons, Henry John Barnard, followed Barnard as the Vicar of Yatton, where he served between 1846 and 1884, and was also Prebendary at Wells. Their younger son, Edward Thomas Barnard, served in the 21st (Royal North British Fusilier) Regiment of Foot between 1846 and 1850 before migrating to Australia where he served as Commissioner of Crown Lands for the Colony of Victoria.

Barnard died of cholera at Granada in Spain in 1855. He was 63.

== Bibliography ==
- Carlaw, Derek (2020). Kent County Cricketers, A to Z: Part One (1806–1914) (PDF). Cardiff: ACS.
- Lewis, Paul (2014). For Kent and Country. Eastbourne: Reveille Press. ISBN 978-19-08336-63-7.
