= John Barnard (cricketer) =

English cricketer (1794–1878)

Personal information
- Born: 6 July 1794; Chislehurst, Kent
- Died: 17 November 1878 (aged 84); King's College, Cambridge
- Relatives: Edward Barnard (grandfather); Henry Barnard (brother); George Barnard (brother)

Domestic team information
- Years: Team
- 1815–1822: Kent
- 1830: Sussex
- FC debut: 17 July 1815 Kent v England
- Last FC: 16 July 1830 Sussex v Surrey
- Source: CricInfo, 19 June 2022

John Barnard FSA (6 July 1794 – 17 November 1878) was an English amateur cricketer who was a Fellow of King's College, Cambridge between 1817 and 1878. Barnard was the President of the Marylebone Cricket Club in 1829 and a noted collector of decorative porcelain.

== Life ==
Barnard was born at Chislehurst in Kent in 1792, the son of the Edward and Mary Ann Barnard (née Beadon). His father served in the West Kent troop of the Yeomanry Cavalry at Chislehurst from their formation in 1793 before being ordained in the Church of England in 1797. Barnard's grandfather, also Edward, was a clergyman who had been a fellow of St John's College, Cambridge and was the Headmaster of Eton College between 1754 and 1765 and the College Provost from 1765 until his death in 1781. Barnard's mother Mary Ann was the daughter of Edward Beadon, the vicar of St Nicolas Church, North Stoneham in Hampshire. She married his father, who had also attended St John's, in 1784. (Note: Barnard's father held a number of appointments in the Church. He died at Alverstoke in Hampshire, where he had been vicar since 1825, in 1840. Despite his father being Provost and having been Headmaster, he did not attend Eton, instead being privately educated.)

Along with his three brothers, Barnard was educated at Eton. He was Captain of Montem in 1814. He went up to King's College, Cambridge in 1814 as a scholar, graduating in 1818. He was elected as a Fellow of the college in 1817, retaining his position for the rest of his life. (Note: At the time, King's College only admitted men who had been educated at Eton. They were eligible for election as Fellows of the College after three years.)

During his life, Barnard was a collector of antique china and porcelain. He was elected as a Fellow of the Society of Antiquaries of London in 1855 and his collection of decorative porcelain was sold by Sotheby's after his death. His entry in Alumni Cantabrigienses also noted that he attended The Derby each year for more than 50 years. He was Senior Fellow at King's when he died in his rooms at the college in 1878 aged 84 and is buried in Mill Road Cemetery in Cambridge.

== Cricket ==
A wicket-keeper, Barnard is not known to have played whilst at school. He made his important debut for Kent against England (i.e., the "rest" of England) in 1815 at Wrotham Napps, playing alongside his brother Henry Watson Barnard who also made his debut in the same match. He played in a total of 18 important matches for a variety of teams, most of which were connected to the Marylebone Cricket Club (MCC). He first played for the club in non-important matches in 1816. He played twice more for Kent in 1822 and twice for Sussex in 1830, the final two important matches of his career. He appeared three times for the Gentlemen against the Players, playing in the match in 1822, 1825 and 1829, and was President of MCC in 1829–30.

Henry Watson Barnard, who was a clergyman, played in five important matches. Another of Barnard's brothers, George, also played important cricket, playing twice for Cambridge University in 1825 and 1826, having captained Eton whilst at school. (Note: Barnard's oldest brother Charles is not known to have played. He lived between 1790 and 1878 and after attending Eton and St John's, Cambridge was the British Chargé d'affaires at Coburg from 1842.)

== Bibliography ==
- Carlaw, Derek (2020). Kent County Cricketers, A to Z: Part One (1806–1914) (PDF). Cardiff: ACS.
- Lewis, Paul (2014). For Kent and Country. Eastbourne: Reveille Press. ISBN 978-19-08336-63-7.
