= Uppington =

Village in Shropshire, England

Coordinates: 52.682°N 2.593°W

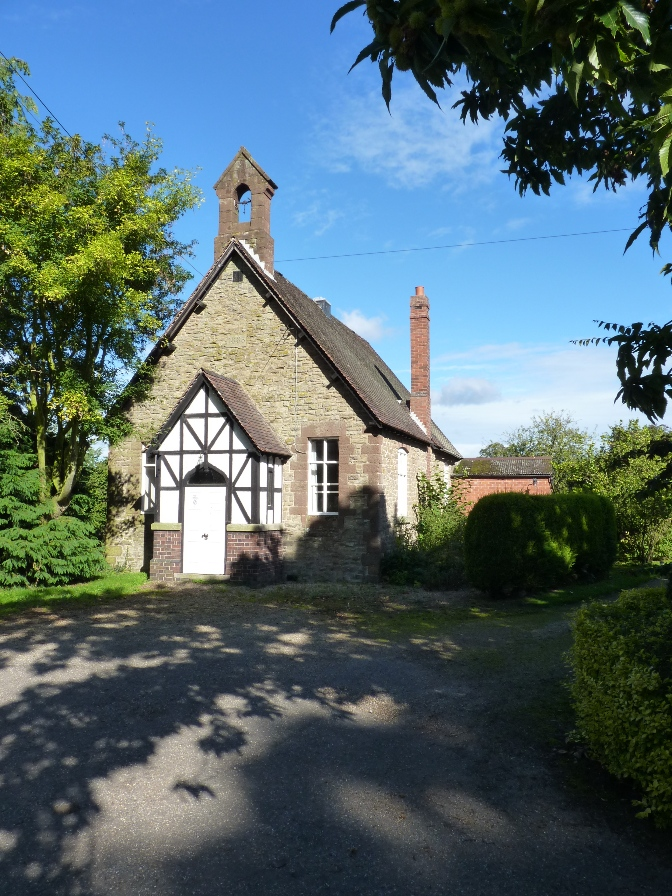
- Uppington Village Hall

- Location within Shropshire
- Population: 86 (1961 Census Data)
- OS grid reference: SJ599095
- Civil parish: Wroxeter and Uppington
- Unitary authority: Shropshire
- Ceremonial county: Shropshire
- Region: West Midlands
- Country: England
- Sovereign state: United Kingdom
- Post town: TELFORD
- Postcode district: TF6
- Dialling code: 01952
- Police: West Mercia
- Fire: Shropshire
- Ambulance: West Midlands
- UK Parliament: Shrewsbury and Atcham

Uppington is a village and former civil parish, now in the parish of Wroxeter and Uppington, in the Shropshire district, in the ceremonial county of Shropshire, England. It is situated 7.5 miles East from Shrewsbury and 4 miles South-East from Wellington. It is located within the Diocese of Lichfield, within the Rural Deanery of Wrockwardine. Uppington covers a total area of around 706 acres, much of this being open fields, used for arable and pastoral farming, as well as a small amount of local woodland. In 1961 the parish had a population of 86. On 1 April 1986 the parish was abolished and merged with Wroxeter to form "Uppington & Wroxeter".

== The Village ==
The village of Uppington consists of various residential houses, Uppington Village Hall, Avenue Farm, Raby Farm, Raby Estates, The Old Vicarage and Uppington House. The village is fairly isolated and is only connected via four small tracks connecting it to other villages, the Northern track out of the village leads to Roman Road/B5061 and the A5. Surrounding Uppington are the small villages of Charlton, Aston, Rushton, Donnington, Uckington, Norton and Wroxeter. These small villages lay in between the two large towns of Shrewsbury and Telford. The far West of Uppington holds Uppington Village Hall, Uppington Holy Trinity Church, Uppington House and the Raby Estates. To the far East of the village is the Raby Sawmill, part of the Raby Estate of Shropshire.

The first mention of Uppington was in the Domesday Book. Uppington had 5 villagers, 4 smallholders and 6 ploughmen. In 1870–72, John Marius Wilson's Imperial Gazetteer of England and Wales described Uppington as having a population of 95, consisting of 15 houses.

In the next decade the 1881 census states that the population of Uppington village was 101, showing a stable population with very low growth. The Parishes of Wroxeter and Uppington were each formed when there was little difference between church and state. The community at the time was centred on the parish church. The parish council manages local amenities, such as the operation of street lighting.

In the Parish of Wroxeter and Uppington the village of Wroxeter is the largest village in the area. Wroxeter has been built around the Roman remains of Viroconium Cornoviorum, a former Roman city. It has been proposed in the past that Uppington should have Conservation Area Status. However this has been ruled out by local residents, likely to be due to the local farmers who would strongly oppose.

== Businesses ==
- Avenue Farm

Avenue Farm operates as a bed & breakfast out of an 18th-century farmhouse.

- Grange Farm

Grange Farm is a 17th-century farmhouse that previously operated as a bed & breakfast.

- Raby Estate

Raby Estate is a private rural estate which has locally supplied a mix of hard and softwoods which are sustainably grown and FSC certified. These are produced locally for Raby Sawmill.

- Raby Sawmill

Raby Sawmill works in association with Raby Estate. Raby sawmill was opened to the public 30 years ago to offer locals sustainably sourced wood to aid construction, building schemes and restoration projects to restore old timber framed housing. The saw mill is completely open to the public at certain hours as is the Raby Estate.

== Wroxeter & Uppington Cricket Club ==
Wroxeter & Uppington Cricket Club was formed in 1906 by local members of the parish and the surrounding area. For the first 12 years of the club's existence it was based at Donnington village. The club moved to its present ground after the end of the First World War. The present pavilion used opened in 1971, around the time of completion of the club's changing facilities. The cricket club is located between the large towns of Shrewsbury and Telford, situated in the Parish of Wroxeter and Uppington, North-West of Uppington. In 2001 the cricket club joined the new pyramid scheme and entered the Birmingham Cricket League where they were largely successful. However, in 2005 Wroxeter & Uppington returned to the Shropshire County Cricket League Division Two. The cricket team won the Shropshire cricket league knockout in 2009 and 2010. Following this in 2011 they won the Shropshire cricket league division one title. The current 2nd XI is now in the Shropshire County Cricket Premier Reserve Division One after their 4 league wins and promotions in the last 5 years. The Wroxeter & Uppington Cricket Club have merged with the Wroxeter Mercenaries.

== Uppington Holy Trinity Church ==
Uppington Holy Trinity Church was built around the Norman Period. The original architect was George Sidebotham. It was restored and partly rebuilt in 1885 by J.P. Pritchard of Darlington, all financed by the Fourth Duke of Cleveland. It has since been listed as a grade 2 building. The Patron of Uppington Holy Trinity is the Deanery of Wrockwardine Patronage Board. The current Reverend is Paul Cawthorne.

== Notable people ==
- Richard Allestree (1619 at Uppington – 1681), Royalist churchman, author and sometime Provost of Eton College.
- Goronwy Owen (1723–1769), Welsh poet, concurrently curate at Uppington church and master at Donnington School 1748–53.
- Richard "Dick" Stratton (1923 at Uppington – 2007) was a RAF wartime flight engineer, a notable pioneer of aviation engineering and later an innovative influence in light aircraft and gliding practices. He was also a licensed (and sometimes controversial) CAA inspector,

== Transport ==
Bus services coming into Uppington consist of the A21 bus leading to Harlescott in North Shrewsbury. The nearest railway station is located to the North-East in Wellington.

== See also ==
- Listed buildings in Wroxeter and Uppington
