= George Barnard (cricketer) =

English cricketer (1804–1827)

Personal information
- Full name: George William Barnard
- Born: 2 February 1804; Harefield, Middlesex
- Died: 1827 (aged 22–23); Cambridge
- Relatives: Edward Barnard (grandfather); Henry Barnard (brother); John Barnard (brother)

Domestic team information
- Years: Team
- 1825–1826: Cambridge University
- FC debut: 23 May 1825 Cambridge University v Cambridge Town Club
- Last FC: 17 May 1826 Cambridge University v Cambridge Town Club
- Source: CricInfo, 20 June 2022

George William Barnard (2 February 1804 – 1827) was an English amateur cricketer who played twice in important matches for Cambridge University Cricket Club during the 1820s. He died at Cambridge before he graduated.

== Life ==
Barnard was born at Harefield in Middlesex in 1804, the son of the Edward and Mary Ann Barnard (née Beadon). His father served in the West Kent troop of the Yeomanry Cavalry at Chislehurst from their formation in 1793 before being ordained in the Church of England in 1797; he was appointed to Harefield parish in 1803, and the family lived there until 1807. Barnard's grandfather, also Edward, was a clergyman who had been a fellow of St John's College, Cambridge and was the Headmaster of Eton College between 1754 and 1765 and the College Provost from 1765 until his death in 1781. Barnard's mother Mary Ann was the daughter of Edward Beadon, the vicar of St Nicolas Church, North Stoneham in Hampshire. She married his father, who had also attended St John's, in 1784. (Note: Barnard's father held a number of appointments in the Church. He died at Alverstoke in Hampshire, where he had been vicar since 1825, in 1840. Despite his father being Provost and having been Headmaster, he did not attend Eton, instead being privately educated.)

Along with his three brothers, Barnard was educated at Eton. He was Captain of Montem in 1823 and captained the college cricket team in 1822 and 1823, playing both years in the Eton v Harrow match at Lord's. He went up to King's College, Cambridge in 1823 as a scholar and was elected as a Fellow of the college in 1826. (Note: At the time, King's College only admitted men who had been educated at Eton. They were eligible for election as Fellows of the College after three years.) He died at Cambridge in 1827 without graduating. (Note: The Eton School List gives Barnard's date of death as 1827; Alumni Cantabrigienses gives it as 1827 and this is the date used by other sources and so has been adopted here.)

== Cricket ==
Both of Barnard's important cricket matches were played for Cambridge University against the Cambridge Town Club, the first in 1825 and the second in 1826. He scored a total of 77 runs with a highest score of 51. He played other matches for the university against Bury St Edmunds, at the time a strong team, and is known to have played for a team organised by William Deedes at Sevenoaks Vine in 1823.

Two of Barnard's brothers also played important cricket. Henry Watson Barnard, who was a clergyman, played in five important matches between 1815 and 1823 and John Barnard played 18 matches between 1815 and 1830 and was President of Marylebone Cricket Club (MCC) in 1829. (Note: Barnard's oldest brother Charles is not known to have played. He lived between 1790 and 1878 and after attending Eton and St John's, Cambridge was the British Chargé d'affaires at Coburg from 1842.) All three of his brothers also attended Cambridge, Charles and Henry attending St John's College, whilst John was a Fellow at King's from 1817 until his death in 1878.

== Bibliography ==
- Carlaw, Derek (2020). Kent County Cricketers, A to Z: Part One (1806–1914) (PDF). Cardiff: ACS.
- Haygarth, Arthur (1996) [1862]. Scores & Biographies, Volume 1 (1744–1826). Kennington: Frederick Lillywhite. ISBN 978-19-00592-23-9.
