= Uckington =

Uckington may refer to:

- Uckington, Gloucestershire
- Uckington, Shropshire
