= George Barnard =

George Barnard may refer to:

- George Alfred Barnard (1915–2002), British statistician
- George G. Barnard (1829–1879), New York judge
- George Grey Barnard (1863–1938), American sculptor
- George Henry Barnard (1868–1954), Canadian politician
- George N. Barnard (1819–1902), American Civil War photographer
- George William Barnard (1873–1941), Australian politician
- George Barnard (zoologist) (1831–1894), British ornithologist and entomologist
- George Barnard (cricketer) (1804–1827), English cricketer

== See also ==
- George Barnard Baker (1834–1910), Canadian lawyer and political figure
