= William George (priest) =

English clergyman (died 1756)

William George (died 1756) was an English churchman and academic, Provost of King's College, Cambridge from 1743 and Dean of Lincoln from 1748.

== Life ==
Born in London, he was educated at Eton College and admitted to King's College, Cambridge, in 1715. He proceeded to his degree of B.A. 1719, M.A. 1723, and D.D. 1728. Leaving university, he became assistant-master, and eventually principal, of Eton, a position he held for around 15 years. George, a fine scholar, had little of the necessary touch with the boys, who in 1729 rioted spectacularly in a pupil rebellion, unique in Eton's history.

In 1731 George was a canon of Windsor and chaplain in ordinary to George II. His further advancement was a result of the backing of Sir Robert Walpole, the Prime Minister. George left his scholastic career in 1743, when he was appointed to the vacant provostship of King's College, Cambridge: his race was a genuine contest with John Chapman, also a candidate, but George succeeded by 28 votes to 10. The same year he was also elected vice-chancellor of Cambridge.

In 1747, the deanery of Winchester fell vacant, and George was nominated; but for the sake of his friend Samuel Pegge, he exchanged it for the deanery of Lincoln, where he was installed in 1748. He also resigned in favour of Dr. Pegge his rectory of Whittington, Derbyshire. He died on 2 August 1756.

== Works ==
George was a popular preacher, and several of his sermons were printed, among them a sermon preached before the Society for the Propagation of the Gospel, 1732, and a second delivered before the House of Commons in 1752. He was also a Greek scholar and Latin poet: some of his poems were in the Musæ Etonenses (1755), edited by John Prinsep. Some lines on the death of Frederick, Prince of Wales were the topic of an anecdote of Pope Benedict XIV.

== Family ==
During his residence at Eton, George married Miss Bland, daughter of Henry Bland, his predecessor.

Academic offices
Preceded by Henry Bland	Head Master of Eton College; 1728–1743	Succeeded by William Cooke
