= George Moore (priest) =

George Moore was Archdeacon of Cornwall from 15 February 1788 until his death on 12 March 1807.

Church of England titles
Preceded by John Sleech	Archdeacon of Cornwall; February 1788–March 1807	Succeeded by William Short
