= Henry Godolphin =

English priest and Provost (1648–1733)

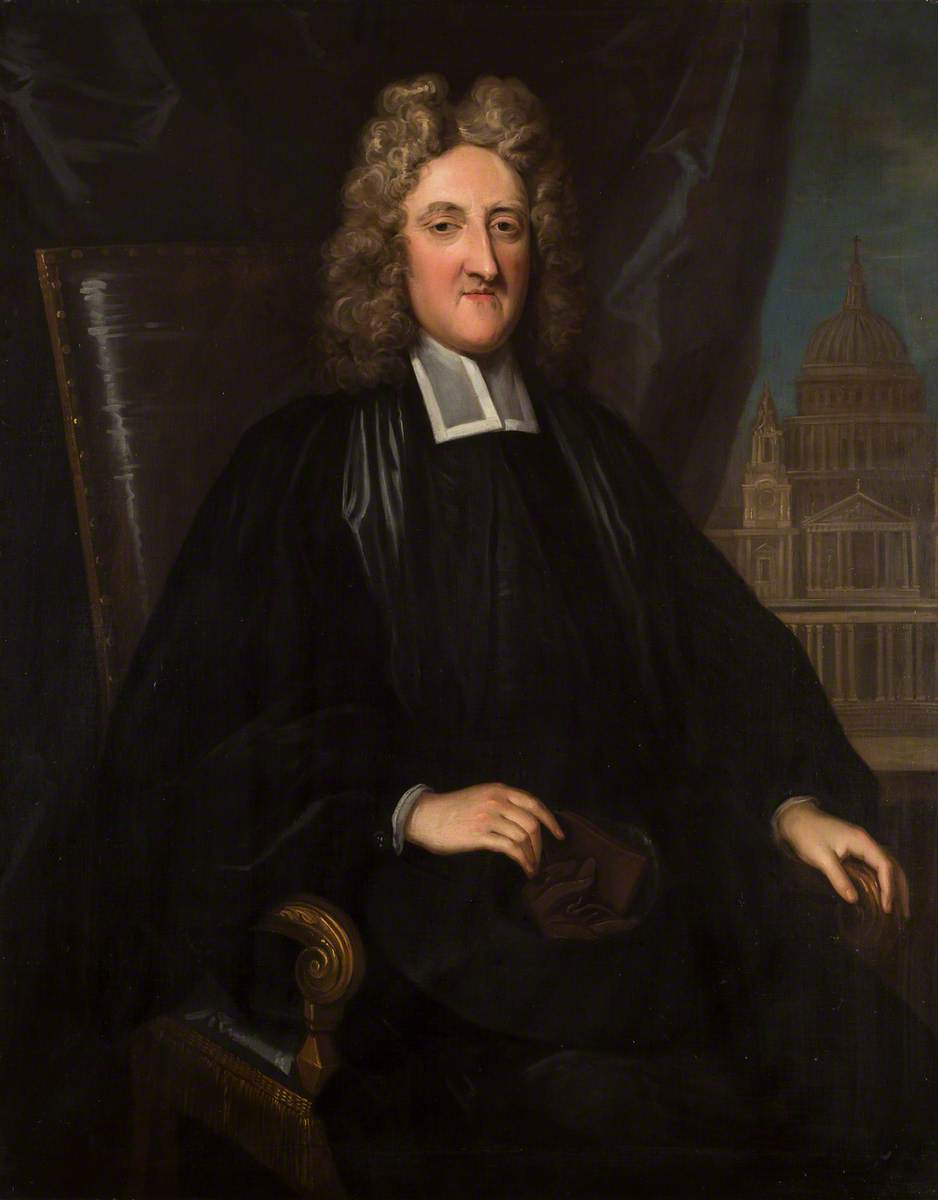
Henry Godolphin

Henry Godolphin (1648–1733) was a Provost of Eton College and Dean of St. Paul's Cathedral in London – a position in which he clashed with Sir Christopher Wren in the period when the new cathedral had reached the finishing touches.

== Life ==
He was born at Godolphin House, Cornwall, on 15 August 1648 as the fourth son of Sir Francis Godolphin, and younger brother of Sidney Godolphin, 1st Earl of Godolphin, by Dorothy, second daughter of Sir Henry Berkeley of Yarlington, Somerset. He was admitted to Eton on 8 October 1665. He matriculated at Wadham College, Oxford on 30 August 1664, and took his Bachelors of Arts in 1668. In the same year, he was elected a fellow of All Souls' College, where he proceeded M.A. in 1672, and B.D. and D.D. on 11 July 1685.

He was made a fellow of Eton College on 14 April 1677. By royal mandate, he was nominated Provost of the college on 16 October 1695, and was installed on 30 October. He was a benefactor to the college, contributing towards the expense of altering the chapel, and erecting at his own cost a copper statue of the founder, Henry VI, in the school yard.

Godolphin arms, Gules, an eagle with two heads, displayed between three fleurs-de-lys, two and one, argent

He was nominated Sneating Prebendary of St. Paul's on 13 November 1683, and held the prebend until his death. After the death of William Sherlock he was elected Dean of St. Paul's on 14 July 1707, and installed on 18 July. He resigned the deanery in October 1726, when he returned to the duties of the provost of Eton. During his tenure of office at St. Paul's he had been on the Rebuilding Commission, representing with John Younger and William Stanley – the rising generation of the cathedral chapter. On matters of detail, there were constant disagreements from 1707 until 1711, when the commission was wound up with the imperious Sir Christopher Wren. Eventually Wren used the influence of the Queen to rid himself of the commission, and there were polemics published aimed at Wren - now in his early eighties; but on the accession of George I in 1714 the commission was set up again. There were more arguments about the dome, with a balustrade or railing proposed, Godolphin arguing for the latter. Wren's career ended on an unsatisfactory note of bitterness and criticism.

Godolphin died at Windsor on 29 January 1732/33, and was buried in Eton College Chapel.

One of the earliest extant boarding houses at Eton College, Godolphin House, is named after him.

== Family ==
He married Mary, daughter of Colonel Sidney Godolphin, MP. She died on 30 June 1743. His son, Sir Francis Godolphin, succeeded his cousin Francis Godolphin as 2nd Baron Godolphin of Helston in 1766; on his death in 1785 the title became extinct. His daughter Mary married William Owen of Porkington.

== Notes ==
Church of England titles
Preceded by William Sherlock	Dean of St Paul's; 1706–1726	Succeeded by Francis Hare
Academic offices
Preceded by Zachary Cradock	Provost of Eton; 1695–1732	Succeeded by Henry Bland
