= Stephen Sleech =

Stephen Sleech (died 8 October 1765) was an 18th-century Honorary Chaplain to the King who was Provost of Eton College from 1746 until his death.

Sleech was the son of Richard Sleech, then teaching at Eton College (later a canon of St George's Chapel, Windsor). He was born at Eton, and educated at Eton and King's College, Cambridge, graduating BA in 1728, BD (per literas regias) in 1743, DD in 1748. He became a Fellow of King's in 1726 and a Fellow of Eton in 1729, and received a Lambeth MA in 1729.

He was Rector of Farnham Royal from 1730 to 1752; and then of Worplesdon, Surrey from 1752 to 1765. He was also chaplain to the King from 1744.

== Notes ==
Preceded by Henry Bland	Provost of Eton College; 1746–1765	Succeeded by Edward Barnard
