= Donnington, Wroxeter and Uppington =

Hamlet in Shropshire, England

Coordinates: 52.666°N 2.622°W

Donnington
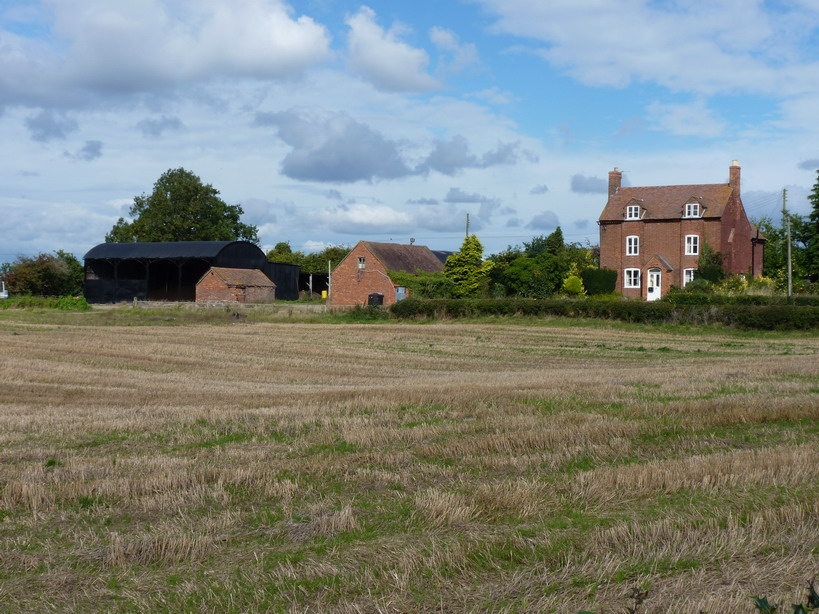
- Farm at Donnington, Shropshire

- Location within Shropshire
- OS grid reference: SJ580078
- Civil parish: Wroxeter and Uppington
- Unitary authority: Shropshire
- Ceremonial county: Shropshire
- Region: West Midlands
- Country: England
- Sovereign state: United Kingdom
- Post town: SHREWSBURY
- Postcode district: SY5
- Dialling code: 01952
- Police: West Mercia
- Fire: Shropshire
- Ambulance: West Midlands
- UK Parliament: Shrewsbury and Atcham

Donnington is a hamlet in the English county of Shropshire. It forms part of the civil parish of Wroxeter and Uppington.

It lies near to Charlton Hill, which rises to 469 feet (143 m) above sea level.

The hamlet contained a now defunct 'free grammar school' under patronage of the Newport family during the 17th and 18th centuries whose pupils included Royalist divine Richard Allestree and Puritan divine Richard Baxter, the latter of whom taught at the school for three months. Welsh poet Goronwy Owen was master at the school as well as curate at Uppington, from 1748 to 1753.
