= Zachary Cradock =

Zachary Cradock (1633–1695) was a provost of Eton, and brother of Samuel Cradock.

== Early life ==
His father was settled in Rutland. He was educated in Cambridge at Emmanuel College, and Queens' College, and elected fellow of the latter on 2 August 1654.

== Career ==
In 1656 Ralph Cudworth recommended him to secretary John Thurloe as resident chaplain at Lisbon, and he held the post for several years. He became canon of Chichester at between 1669 and 1670, and fellow of Eton College in December 1671. He was also chaplain in ordinary to Charles II. On 24 February 1680 he was elected provost of Eton, in succession to Richard Allestree and in opposition to Edmund Waller the poet, who, according to Wood, ‘had tugged hard for it.’ In June 1695 it was reported that the deanery of Lincoln was offered him. He died in September 1695, and was buried in Eton College Chapel.

He was very celebrated as a preacher. His eloquence gained him fame even in that renowned age of pulpit eloquence. It is recorded that though he always spoke ex tempore, he was so far from being vain of the accomplishment as occasionally to put on his spectacles, and spread out on the cushion before him a notebook really containing nothing but blank leaves. Diarist John Evelyn was acquainted with him and frequently visited him at Eton. A sermon by him was preached before the king was published in 1678, and went through five editions before 1695. It was reissued in 1740 and in 1742. Another sermon was issued posthumously in 1706.

Academic offices
Preceded by Richard Allestree	Provost of Eton; 1681–1695	Succeeded by Henry Godolphin
