= Henry Bland (priest) =

English cleric

Henry Bland (circa 1677 – 24 May 1746) was an English cleric.

He was born around 1667 in Yorkshire and educated at Eton College and King's College, Cambridge. He was Rector of Great Bircham, Norfolk from 1706 to 1744 and of Harpley, Norfolk, 1715 to 1744; an Honorary Chaplain to the King and Chaplain to the Royal Chelsea Hospital from 1716; Headmaster of Doncaster School from 1699 to 1710 and then of Eton College from 1719; and Canon of Windsor from 1723 to 1733.

In later life he was Dean of Durham from 1728 to 1746 and Provost of Eton College from 1732 to 1746.

He died on 24 May 1746.

Academic offices
Preceded by Andrew Snape	Head Master of Eton College; 1720–1728	Succeeded by William George
Preceded by Henry Godolphin	Provost of Eton College; 1732–1746	Succeeded by Stephen Sleech
Church of England titles
Preceded by John Montague	Dean of Durham; 1728–1746	Succeeded by The Hon Spencer Cowper
