= John Barker (died 1618) =

English politician

John Barker (15 March 1579 – 30 March 1618) was an English politician.

Barker was born in 1579, son of Rowland Barker (died 1600) of Haughmond Abbey, Shropshire, and his first wife Cicely, daughter of Andrew Charlton of Apley Castle, Shropshire. He was educated at Shrewsbury School and University College, Oxford, where he graduated as B.A. in 1597, then entered Gray's Inn to study law in 1599. The following year he succeeded to his father's estates.

He was a member (MP) of the parliament of England for Shrewsbury in 1601, and became a county magistrate (J.P.) for Shropshire by 1608.

Barker married Margaret, daughter of Sir Francis Newport (died 1623) of High Ercall. He died 12 days after his wife's burial in March 1618 aged 39 and was buried at St Andrew's Church, Wroxeter, Shropshire. The couple left no children, his estates passing to his brother.
