= Listed buildings in Wroxeter and Uppington =

Wroxeter and Uppington is a civil parish in Shropshire, England. It contains 44 listed buildings that are recorded in the National Heritage List for England. Of these, one is listed at Grade I, the highest of the three grades, five are at Grade II*, the middle grade, and the others are at Grade II, the lowest grade. The parish contains the villages of Wroxeter and Uppington and smaller settlements, and is otherwise rural. Wroxeter occupies part of the Roman city of Viroconium Cornoviorum, and items of Roman masonry have been incorporated in some of the buildings in the parish, some of which are listed. Most of the listed buildings in the parish are houses, cottages, farmhouses and farm buildings, many of which are timber framed, and some with cruck construction. The other listed buildings include churches and associated structures, a public house, a milestone, and two pumps.

== Key ==
Grade	Criteria
I	Buildings of exceptional interest, sometimes considered to be internationally important
II*	Particularly important buildings of more than special interest
II	Buildings of national importance and special interest

== Buildings ==
Name and location	Photograph	Date	Notes	Grade
Roman altar 52.68048°N 2.59702°W	—	2nd or 3rd century	The Roman altar is in the churchyard of Holy Trinity Church. It is in grey sandstone and has a rectangular section. There is a moulded base, and on the southwest face is a raised circle.	II
St Andrew's Church; 52.67018°N 2.64716°W		8th or 9th century (probable)	The church incorporates Roman masonry, it has been altered and extended during the centuries, it was restored in 1863, and is now redundant. The church is built in sandstone of differing colours, and has a tile roof. It consists of a nave, a south porch, a chancel, a south vestry, and a west tower. The tower has three stages, diagonal buttresses, a semi-octagonal stair turret with a pyramidal cap, at the top is a moulded string course with corner gargoyles, an embattled parapet and a pyramidal cap with a weathervane.	I
Holy Trinity Church; 52.68054°N 2.59701°W		Late 11th or 12th century	The church was heavily restored and partly rebuilt in 1885, with the addition of the tower and the vestry. The church is built in sandstone with a tile roof, and consists of a nave, a chancel, a south vestry, and a west tower. The tower has three stages, diagonal buttresses, an octagonal stair turret to the northeast, a coped embattled parapet, and a weathervane. The surviving Norman features include the blocked north doorway, and windows in the nave and chancel.	II*
Avenue Farmhouse; 52.68165°N 2.59296°W	—	14th or 15th century	A large extension was added to the farmhouse in the 18th century, and a smaller one in the 19th century. The original part is timber framed with cruck construction, it has been largely rebuilt and the extensions added in red brick on a sandstone plinth, and the roofs are tiled. There is an L-shaped plan, the earliest part has one storey and two bays, and contains casement windows. The later parts are in two storeys and two storeys with an attic, and contain sash windows. Inside the original part is a large full cruck truss.	II
Glebe Cottage; 52.66927°N 2.64617°W	—	15th or 16th century (probable)	The house has been extended and remodelled. It is basically timber framed with cruck construction and has painted brick infill, partly refaced in red brick, and a slate roof. It is partly in one storey with an attic, and partly in two storeys, and has two bays. There is a lean-to porch, and the windows are casements. In the left wall is a full cruck truss.	II
Middle Farm Cottages; 52.67004°N 2.58506°W	—	16th century (probable)	A pair of timber framed cottages with cruck construction that were rebuilt in red brick in the 19th and 20th centuries. They have a tile roof, one storey and attics. On the front is a gabled extension on the left and a gabled porch. The windows are casements, there are gabled dormers, and inside, between the cottages, is a full cruck truss.	II
Lower Farmhouse; 52.67010°N 2.58665°W	—	Late 16th or 17th century	The farmhouse was altered and extended in the 19th century. The early part is timber framed, with refacing, rebuilding and extensions in red brick, and a tile roof. There are two storeys and an attic, and the house consists of a hall range, a projecting gabled cross-wing to the left, and extensions to the right and the rear. The windows are casements, some with segmental heads, and there is a lean-to porch.	II
Banqueting House; 52.65112°N 2.63282°W		c. 1607	The building is partly in red sandstone and partly in red brick with diapering, and has dressings and quoins in grey sandstone. It consists of a two-storey main part and a three-storey turret, each with an octagonal plan. In the ground floor of the main part is a three-bay blind arcade with moulded imposts. The upper floor contains mullioned and transomed windows, and at the top is a balustraded parapet. The turret contains mullioned windows and at the top is an ogee lead cap.	II*
Wall northwest of Eyton Banqueting House; 52.65133°N 2.63321°W	—	c. 1607	The wall is in red sandstone with some grey sandstone blocks and patching in red brick, and it has chamfered tile coping. The wall is about 50 metres (160 ft) long and 2.5 metres (8 ft 2 in) high, and contains buttresses.	II
Wall southwest of Eyton Banqueting House; 52.65056°N 2.63321°W	—	c. 1607	The wall is in red and grey sandstone and red brick, with curved brick coping. It is about 140 metres (460 ft) long and 3 metres (9.8 ft) high, ramped down to 1 metre (3 ft 3 in) at the southwest end. There is a plinth at the southwest and a buttress at the northeast.	II
Tithe Barn Cottage; 52.65158°N 2.63029°W	—	1607	A barn, later a house, that was altered and extended in the 19th century. It is partly timber framed with red brick infill, partly in red sandstone, and partly in red brick, and it has a stone-slate roof. There are two storeys and an attic, and an L-shaped plan with a front of three bays and a rear outshut. The windows are casements. On the north side is a full-height porch with a jettied attic that has a dated bressumer, and it contains a doorway with an ogee head.	II
Duncote Farmhouse; 52.69849°N 2.63364°W	—	Early to mid 17th century	The farmhouse was altered and extended in the 19th century. The original part is timber framed and rendered on the south side, the extensions are in brick, and the roof is tiled. There are two storeys and an attic, and an L-shaped plan, consisting of a hall range, a cross-wing to the west, an outshut in the angle, and a single-story service wing to the right. On the front is a gabled porch, the windows are casements, and there is a gabled dormer.	II
3 Rushton; 52.67036°N 2.58500°W	—	Mid 17th century	The cottage, which was later extended, is timber framed, partly rebuilt in red brick, and has a thatched roof. There is one storey and an attic, two bays, and a lean-to on the right. The windows are casements.	II
The Shop; 52.68233°N 2.64169°W	—	17th century	The house was extended in the 18th century. It is timber framed with red brick infill, the extension is in red brick, the front is painted, and the roof is tiled. The house consists of a main range with two storeys, two bays, and a dentilled eaves cornice, and a gabled cross-wing to the right with one storey and an attic. The doorway has a segmental head and a bracketed segmental hood, there are cross windows in the ground floor of the main range, and casement windows elsewhere.	II
Tudor House; 52.68098°N 2.59611°W		Mid 17th century	A timber framed house with painted brick infill and a tile roof. There are two storeys and an attic, the upper floor and gable ends jettied, with moulded bressumers on shaped brackets. In the centre is a full-height porch with a jettied gable and a round-ached entrance with carved spandrels and pendants. The windows are casements.	II*
Charlton Hill House; 52.66243°N 2.61079°W	—	c. 1660	The house was extended in the 19th century. It is in red brick with stone dressings on a moulded stone plinth with buttresses, floor bands, and stone coped parapets with kneelers. There are two storeys and an attic, and an L-shaped plan, with a main range of seven bays, a later range at an angle to the northwest, and a one-storey extension to the left. In the centre, eight steps lead up to a three-storey porch that has a semicircular gable, a round arch, rusticated pilaster strips, and a dentilled cornice above. At the rear is a stair tower, in the right return are French windows, and the other windows are sashes with segmental heads.	II*
Norton Farmhouse; 52.68148°N 2.64231°W	—	Mid to late 17th century	There have been later alterations. The original part is timber framed with painted brick infill, the extensions are in red brick with a dentilled eaves cornice, and the roof is tiled. There are two storeys and an attic, and an irregular U-shaped plan. On the front is a hip roofed porch, and the windows are casements.	II
Upper Farmhouse; 52.66901°N 2.58304°W	—	1675	The farmhouse was remodelled in the 19th century. It is timber framed, the ground floor has been refaced in brick, the upper floor is rendered, and the roof is tiled. There are two storeys and an attic, two bays, a 19th-century single-storey extension on the left, a stair tower at the rear, and other rear extensions. On the front is a gabled brick porch, in the right return is a canted bay window, and the other windows are casements.	II
3 and 4 Dryton; 52.64952°N 2.62233°W	—	Late 17th century	The cottage was later altered and extended. The original part is timber framed with brick infill and a thatched roof. It has one storey and an attic, and three bays. The windows are casements, and there are eyebrow dormers. The extension is in brick with a tile roof, it forms an L-shaped plan, and has a gabled eaves dormer. In the angle is a lean-to porch.	II
1 Norton Cross Roads; 52.68288°N 2.64173°W		Late 17th century	The cottage is timber framed with painted brick infill, it is rendered on the east side, and has a thatched roof. There is one storey and an attic, a brick lean-to on the west, and a gabled porch on the east. The windows are casements, and there is a central eyebrow dormer.	II
2 and 3 Norton Cross Roads; 52.68241°N 2.64426°W	—	Late 17th century	A pair of timber framed cottages, later remodelled in Gothick style, partly rendered, with infill in render and wattle and daub, and with a half-hipped thatched roof. There is one storey and an attic, and two bays. The windows are Gothick casements with Y-tracery, and there is a central eyebrow dormer. The doorways have moulded architraves and Gothick fanlights with Y-tracery.	II
Garden wall, Charlton Hill House; 52.66249°N 2.61055°W	—	Late 17th century	The garden wall to the east of the house is in red brick. It is about 10 metres (33 ft) long and between 2 metres (6 ft 7 in) and 3 metres (9.8 ft) high. The wall rises up to shaped gable at the west above a segmental-headed boarded door.	II
Donnington House; 52.66659°N 2.62002°W	—	Late 17th century	The house was altered and extended in the 19th century. It is in red brick on a plinth with floor bands and a tile roof. There are two storeys and an attic, and an L-shaped plan with a front of three bays. Most of the windows are sashes, and the doorway has a pilastered surround, a rectangular fanlight, a frieze and a cornice.	II
Former cottage, Donnington House; 52.66662°N 2.62026°W	—	Late 17th century	The cottage, later used for other purposes, is timber framed with painted brick infill, partly rebuilt and extended in painted brick, and with a tile roof and a weathervane. There is one storey, one bay, a small outshut to the right, and a later two-storey brick extension recessed to the right.	II
Cow house and garage, Little Hill Farm; 52.65929°N 2.56357°W	—	Late 17th century	The building is timber framed with red brick infill and some weatherboarding on a high brick plinth, and has a tile roof. There is one storey and an attic, and two bays. It contains garage doors, a cowhouse door and a window, and at the rear is a gabled eaves dormer.	II
Smethcote Farm; 52.69421°N 2.64714°W	—	Late 17th century (probable)	A farmhouse, remodelled in the 19th century and divided into two dwellings, it is in rendered timber framing, partly refaced and rebuilt in painted brick, with quoins and a tile roof. There are two storeys and an attic, and an L-shaped plan, with a four-bay hall range, a flush cross-wing to the east, and outshuts in the angle. The windows are casements.	II
Wroxeter Grange; 52.66989°N 2.64691°W	—	1690	The house was altered and extended in the 19th and 20th centuries. It is in rendered and painted brick, and has a tile roof. There is an L-shaped plan, the house is partly in two storeys and partly in two storeys with an attic, and there is a rear service wing. The front has three bays, the middle bay projecting and gabled. In the left return is a doorway with pilasters, a frieze and a cornice, and the windows are casements.	II
The Old Post Office; 52.67075°N 2.64722°W		Late 17th or early 18th century	The house was later extended. The original part is timber framed with painted brick infill, the extension has planted timbers, and the roof is tiled. There is one storey and an attic, three bays, and a flush cross-wing on the left. On the front is a gabled porch, and in the cross-wing is a moulded bressumer. The windows are casements, and there are two gabled half-dormers.	II
Eyton on Severn Farmhouse and wall 52.65163°N 2.63395°W	—	18th century (probable)	The farmhouse was remodelled and extended in the 19th century, and it incorporates material from an earlier mansion. The older part is in grey sandstone, the extensions are in brick, partly rendered, and there is a two-span tiled roof, hipped over the front range. The house has a plinth, moulded eaves brackets, and two storeys. There are three bays, and a recessed bay on the right. The windows are sashes, and on the front is a porch with a cornice and a coped parapet. Adjoining the house is a sandstone wall containing an archway.	II
Horse Shoe Inn; 52.68094°N 2.62692°W		18th century	A house, later a public house, that was later extended. It is in rendered brick on a plinth, with a band and a tile roof. There are two storeys, a central range of three bays, and projecting single-storey extensions at both ends. On the front is a gabled porch with a dentilled cornice and a segmental-headed doorway, and the windows are casements.	II
Yew Tree House; 52.66993°N 2.58442°W	—	1775	A red brick house with a dentilled eaves cornice and a tile roof. There are two storeys and an attic, and an L-shaped plan, with a main range of three bays, and a single-storey rear wing. In the right return is a lean-to porch, the windows are casements with segmental heads, and there is a datestone.	II
Walled garden southwest of Eyton on Severn Farmhouse; 52.65072°N 2.63516°W	—	Late 18th century (probable)	The garden is enclosed by a wall in red brick and some red sandstone. It has an approximate;y square plan, with sides of about 40 metres (130 ft). The wall has buttresses, and contains a segmental-headed doorway.	II
Railings and retaining wall, Tern Bridge; 52.67968°N 2.66281°W	—	Late 18th century (probable)	The retaining wall to the east of the bridge is in red brick with grey sandstone coping. It is about 25 metres (82 ft) long, and carries wrought iron railings.	II
Uckington Farmhouse; 52.68436°N 2.62640°W	—	Late 18th century	The farmhouse is in red brick on a plinth, with a dentilled eaves cornice and a hipped slate roof. There are three storeys, a double-depth plan, a front of three bays, the middle bay projecting under a pedimented gable, and a rear one-storey service wing. In the centre is a gabled latticed wooden porch, and a doorway with a moulded architrave and a three-part fanlight. Most of the windows are casements with segmental heads, and some are blind.	II
Ice house 52.64860°N 2.63564°W	—	18th or 19th century (probable)	The ice house has been excavated out of natural red sandstone. A segmental-headed entrance leads to a circular chamber, a segmental arch leads from this to a rectangular chamber, and a segmental arch leads from here into a deeper circular chamber.	II
Tern Lodge and wall 52.68039°N 2.65825°W		Late 18th or early 19th century	The former lodge to Attingham Park is in sandstone on a plinth, with a band, a moulded dentilled cornice, and a pyramidal slate roof with a lead cap. The lodge has two storeys, and a hexagonal plan with three projecting porches. Each porch has a round arch in each face, a moulded cornice, and a triangular pedimented gable. The doorways have moulded architraves, and radial fanlights. To the left is a three-bay red brick screen wall with stone coping, and a square end-pier with a stone cap.	II*
Gates and gate piers, Tern Lodge; 52.68042°N 2.65811°W		Late 18th or early 19th century	There are three square piers in grey sandstone, each on a plinth and with a pyramidal cap. Between the left pair of piers are wrought iron gates, and to the left and the right are wrought iron railings.	II
Confluence Cottage and wall 52.67825°N 2.66081°W	—	Early 19th century	A stuccoed red brick house with deep eaves, a hipped slate roof, two storeys, and three bays. In the centre is a porch with a segmental archway and a hipped roof, and a doorway with a moulded architrave. The windows are three-light casements, and to the left is a brick screen wall.	II
Folly; 52.66953°N 2.64735°W	—	19th century (probable)	The folly in the grounds of Wroxeter Grange is in sandstone, and re-uses Roman and medieval material. In the centre are two open arches flanked by Roman columns and capitals, above which is a gable with a round-arched niche in the tympanum. Outside these is a two-bay arcade with an urn finial.	II
Milestone near Charlton Hill House; 52.65811°N 2.61701°W	—	Mid 19th century (probable)	The milestone is on the southwest side of the B4380 road. It is in grey sandstone and has a chamfered top. The milestone carries a cast iron plate with the distances in miles to Shrewsbury and to Ironbridge.	II
Pump, Donnington House; 52.66666°N 2.62023°W	—	Mid to late 19th century	The pump is in painted cast iron. It has a circular shaft with moulded rings, a fluted top with a splayed spout, a fluted domed cap, and a curved handle.	II
Pump, Duncote Farmhouse; 52.69846°N 2.63349°W	—	Mid to late 19th century	The pump is in painted cast iron. It has a circular shaft and top with moulded rings, a fluted domed cap, and a curved handle.	II
2 Uppingham; 52.68100°N 2.59597°W	—	Late 19th century	A rendered house with a tile roof and two storeys. On the front is a gabled porch with a round-headed arch, there is one cross window, and the other windows are casements.	II
Gates, gate piers and walls, St Andrew's Church; 52.67011°N 2.64765°W		Late 19th century	The gates are in cast iron. The gate piers consist of a pair of Roman sandstone columns with moulded capitals and square bases. The flanking walls are in sandstone, they are ramped up to the centre, and have end piers with chamfered plinths.	II
