= Nicholas Lockyer =

English clergyman and Independent minister

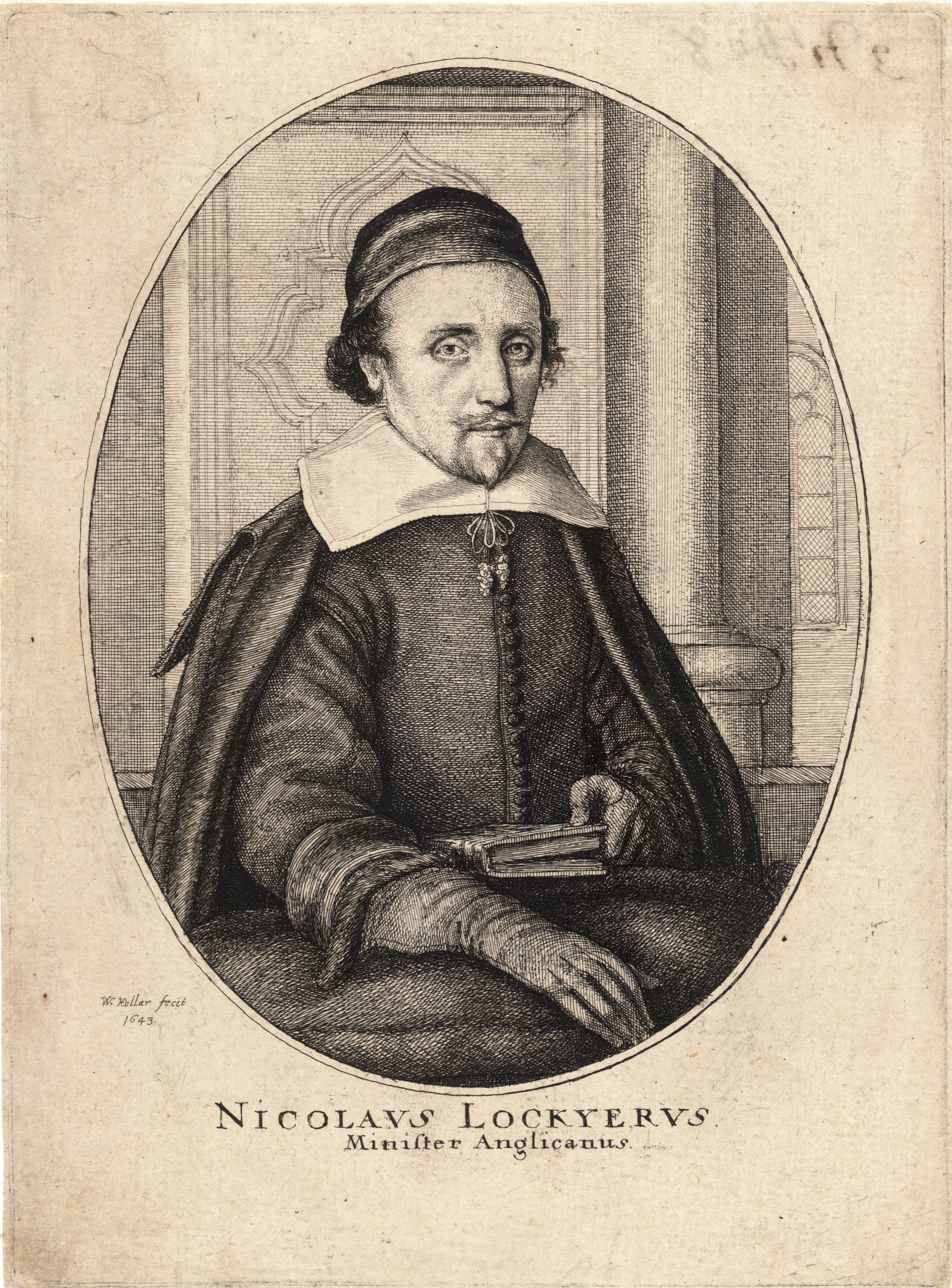
Nicholas Lockyer, engraving by Wenceslas Hollar.

Nicholas Lockyer (1611–1685) was an English clergyman and Independent minister, a close supporter of Oliver Cromwell and Provost of Eton College, and later an ejected minister and nonconformist.

== Life ==
=== Early career ===
He was son of William Lockyer of Glastonbury, Somerset. On 4 November 1631 he matriculated at Oxford at New Inn Hall, graduated B.A. on 14 May 1633, was incorporated at Cambridge in 1635, and proceeded M.A. from Emmanuel College in 1636. Upon the outbreak of the First English Civil War he took the covenant and engagement, and became known as a fervid, powerful preacher. He was frequently called upon to deliver the fast sermon before the House of Commons. (Note: Fast sermons, between January 1642 and April 1649, were regular sermons preached in Parliament on the fourth Wednesday of every month.)

In 1649, Cromwell made him his chaplain. Cromwell then made him his chaplain, appointed him fellow of Eton College on 21 January 1650, and in November 1651 sent him to Scotland as preacher with the parliamentary commissioners.

In December 1653 Lockyer, being then a preacher at Whitehall, was appointed member of a projected commission for the ejecting and settling of ministers; that scheme having failed, he was appointed a commissioner for the approbation of public preachers. As M.A. of twelve years' standing he was created B.D. at Oxford on 5 June 1654 and became Provost of Eton on 14 January 1659; he was ejected at the Restoration.

=== Loss of clerical posts ===
When the Uniformity Act 1662 came into force, he was deprived of his post as preacher at St. Pancras, Soper Lane, and rector of St. Benet Sherehog, London. His persistent disregard of Act compelled him to retire for a time to Rotterdam in September 1666. In 1670 he had again to leave the country for publishing anonymously a tract entitled Some Seasonable Queries upon the late Act against Conventicles. To the last he persisted in exercising his ministry. He ultimately settled at Woodford, Essex where he died on 13 March 1685, and was buried at St. Mary, Whitechapel. He left a son, Cornelius, and five daughters.

He had accumulated property. On 30 June 1653 the council of state resolved to settle lands of inheritance to the value of £200 a year on him and his heirs forever out of deans' and chapters' lands, and an ordinance was passed to that effect on 3 February 1651. He bargained to have the value in money at ten years' purchase, and accordingly received £2,100, with which he purchased the manors of Hambleton and Blackwell, Worcestershire, by indenture dated 27 September 1654. Besides his Worcestershire estates he possessed property at Woodford and Barking, and in Ireland in Munster, which he purchased by virtue of an act made for speedily reducing the rebels of Ireland.

== Family ==
He was married with six children.

== Works ==
Lockyer published three of his more important works in small quarto, with a general title-page dated 1643. They are:

- 'Christ's Communion with his Church Militant," 1644 (4th edit., Cambridge, 1645; another edit. London, 1650).
- 'A Divine Discovery of Sincerity, according to its proper and peculiar Nature,' 1643 (first printed in 1643, and again in 1649).
- 'Baulme for Bleeding England and Ireland, or seasonable Instructions for persecuted Christians, delivered in severall Sermons,' 1644 (originally printed in 1643, and known also by its running title, 'Useful Instructions for these evill Times').

In 1651 Lockyer preached at Edinburgh a discourse on a visible church, which he afterwards published with the title 'A little Stone out of the Mountain: Church Order briefly opened,' Leith, 1652. It gave great offence to Scottish presbyterians, and was refuted at length by James Wood, professor of theology at St. Andrews, in a pamphlet called 'A little Stone, pretended to be out of the Mountain, tried and found to be a Counterfeit,' Edinburgh, 1654.

Lockyer's other writings are:

- 'England faithfully watch't with in her Wounds, or Christ as a Father sitting up with his Children in their Swooning State, the summe of severall Lectures painfully preached upon Colossians i.,' London, 1646.
- 'An Olive Leaf, or a Bud of the Spring, viz. Christ's Resurrection and its end', London, 1650.
- 'A Memorial of God's Judgments. Spiritual and Temporal, or Sermons to call to Remembrance,' London, 1671.
- 'Spiritual Inspection, or a Review of the Heart.'
- 'The Young Man's Call and Duty.'
- 'Biblical sincerity discovered'
- 'Christ’s resurrection from the dead'

He also published two fast sermons delivered before the House of Commons in 1646 and 1659.

== Attribution ==
- This article incorporates text from a publication now in the public domain: Lee, Sidney, ed. (1893). "Lockyer, Nicholas". Dictionary of National Biography. Vol. 34. London: Smith, Elder & Co.
