= William Short (priest) =

William Short, DD (c. 1760 – 23 May 1826) was the Archdeacon of Cornwall from 1807 until his death.

Short was born in Exeter and educated at Christ Church, Oxford, where he matriculated in 1778 at age 18, and graduated B.A. in 1782. He held livings at Wortley and Teignmouth.

Church of England titles
| Preceded by George Moore | Archdeacon of Cornwall; February 1807–June 1826 | Succeeded by John Bull |
