= William Hayward Roberts =

English poet and Anglican priest (c. 1734-1791)

William Hayward Roberts (baptised 1734 – 1791) was an English born schoolmaster, poet and biblical critic, cleric and Provost of Eton College.

== Life ==
He was born in Gloucester, the third son of Richard Roberts of Abergavenny and his wife Eleanor. He was educated at Eton College, and elected to a scholarship at King's College, Cambridge. He was a Fellow of King's, from 1756 to 1761. He graduated B.A. in 1757, and became an assistant master at Eton in the same year. While William Hayley was at Eton his poetical aspirations were encouraged by Roberts, then an usher in the school.

In 1760 Roberts commenced M.A., and in 1771 he was appointed to a fellowship at Eton College. He was created D.D. at Cambridge in 1773, was presented to the rectory of Everdon, Northamptonshire, in 1778, and was inducted to the rectory of Farnham Royal, Buckinghamshire, on 3 June 1779.

After the death of Edward Barnard, Roberts was appointed Provost of Eton College on 12 December 1781. For many years he was one of the king's chaplains. He died at Eton on 5 December 1791.

According to William Cole, Roberts held noisy card playing parties at Eton. Fanny Burney found him "good-humoured, loquacious, gay, civil, and parading". Both remarked on how fat he was.

== Works ==
Roberts in 1755 contributed English verses to the university collection, on the visit of the Duke of Newcastle, In 1758 he gained the members' prize at Cambridge on the subject, Utrum diversarum Gentium Mores et Instituta a diverso earum situ explicari possint? Cambridge, 1758. Elegia scripta in coemeterio rustico latine reditta, published in 1762, was a Latin translation of Thomas Gray's Elegy Written in a Country Churchyard, with Christopher Anstey.

He wrote also:

- Arimant and Tamira, fable, 1757.
- The Poor Man's Prayer, An Elegy, 1766.
- Judah Restored, a poem in six books in blank verse, two vols. London, 1774. His major work, it was a boyhood favourite of Robert Southey, and praised by Robert Aris Willmott. Extracts were in the Ezekiel Sanford–Robert Walsh, Jr. American anthology, Works of the British Poets.
- A Poetical Essay on the Existence, the Attributes, and the Providence of God, 3 parts, London, 1771.
- A Poetical Epistle to Christopher Anstey, Esq., on the English Poets, chiefly those who have written in Blank Verse (anon.), London, 1773.
- Corrections of various Passages in the English Version of the Old Testament; upon the authority of ancient Manuscripts and ancient Versions, London, 1794; published by his son William. Roberts wished to reduce the number of italicised supplementary words that occur in the Authorised Version.

A collection of Roberts's Poems appeared at London in 1774; new edition 1776.

== Family ==
Roberts was twice married. By his first wife, Jane Pitt, sister of John Pitt, he had six or seven children; she died in 1776. The eldest son, the Rev. William Roberts, fellow and vice-provost of Eton College and rector of Worplesdon, Surrey, died on 1 January 1833, aged 71; his third daughter Jane married George Wyndham, 4th Earl of Egremont. The second son, John, known as a writer, and third son, Richard, were ordained. Other children (George, Henry, Rosamond, and Eleanor) are also taken to be from this marriage.

His second wife was Charlotte Chamberlayne (born 1741), daughter of Edward Chamberlayne, rector of Great Cressingham, and Elizabeth de Grey his wife. She was sister of: Thomas Chamberlayne, a fellow of Eton College; Edward Chamberlayne, a Treasury official; and Ann Chamberlayne, who married Benjamin Kennicott. Also to George Chamberlayne, a Catholic convert.
