= John Sleech =

John Sleech (1711–1788) was the Archdeacon of Cornwall from 1741 to 1788.

He was the son of Richard Sleech, then teaching at Eton College (later a canon of St George's Chapel, Windsor), and was baptised in Eton chapel on 16 August 1711. He was educated at Eton and King's College, Cambridge, graduating BA in 1734, MA in 1737. He was a Fellow of King's from 1733.

He taught as an assistant master at Eton.

He held the following livings in the church:

- Vicar of Sidbury, Devon, 1737
- Prebendary of Exeter Cathedral, 1739–88
- Archdeacon of Cornwall, 1741–88
- Canon residentiary of Exeter Cathedral, 1747–88
- Prebendary of Gloucester Cathedral, 1769–88

Sleech was from Farringdon, Devon.

Church of England titles
Preceded by George Allanson	Archdeacon of Cornwall; February 1741–June 1788	Succeeded by George Moore
