= Richard Sleech =

Richard Sleech (died 2 March 1730) was a Canon of Windsor from 1722 to 1730.

== Life ==
Richard Sleech was the son of Edward Sleech, organist of Eton College. He was educated at Eton and at King's College, Cambridge, graduating BA in 1698, MA in 1701, DD in 1720. He was a Fellow of King's from 1697.

He was appointed:

- Assistant Master and Fellow of Eton College 1715
- Rector of Hitcham 1702 - 1730
- Chaplain to the Bishop of Ely 1721
- Rector of Farnham Royal 1721 - 1730

He was appointed to the sixth stall in St George's Chapel, Windsor Castle in 1722 and held this until he died in 1730.

He was buried in the chapel at Windsor on 4 March 1730.

== Family ==
Sleech's children included:

- Stephen Sleech, Provost of Eton and royal chaplain
- John Sleech, Archdeacon of Cornwall
- Henry Sleech, Assistant Master at Eton
- Lucy Sleech, married Stephen Weston, Bishop of Exeter
- Anne Sleech, married Charles Hawtrey, Sub-Dean of Exeter
