= Wroxeter and Uppington =

Civil parish in Shropshire, England

Coordinates: 52.66974°N 2.64°W

- Civil parish
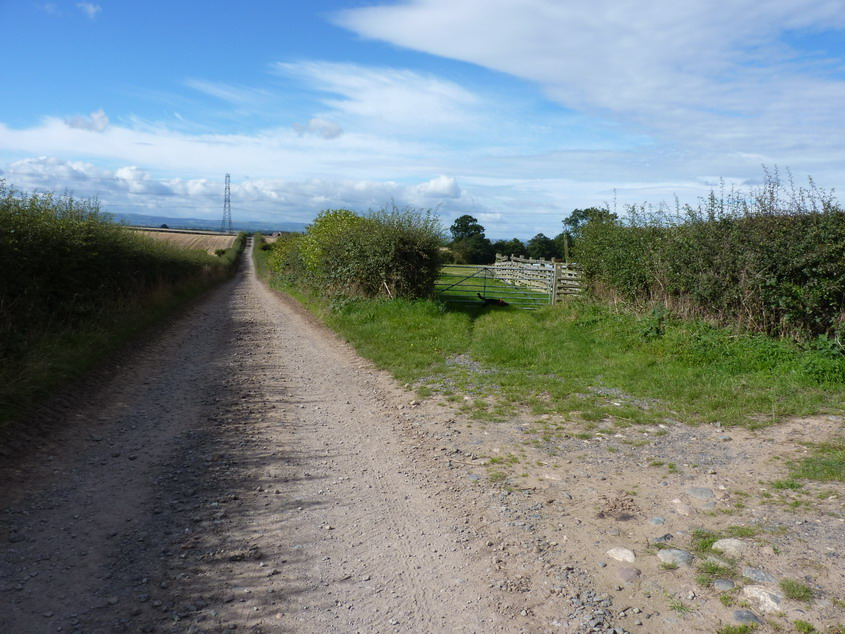
- Track from Uppington towards Uckington.

- Location within the United Kingdom
- Interactive map of Wroxeter and Uppington
- Population: 382
- Police
- Fire
- Ambulance

Wroxeter and Uppington is a civil parish in the English county of Shropshire. The population of the Civil Parish at the 2011 census was 382. It lies mainly between the River Severn and the old A5 (now the B5061) and stretches from Atcham to The Wrekin.

The main villages are Wroxeter and Uppington. Also forming part of the parish are the hamlets of Rushton, Charlton Hill, Donnington, Eyton and Dryton, as well as Atcham Business Park/Industrial Estate.

The parish has an active cricket club, the Wroxeter & Uppington CC. Formed in 1906, it was originally based in Donnington, and now has a ground in Uppington.

== See also ==
- Listed buildings in Wroxeter and Uppington
