= Richard Allestree =

English Royalist churchman

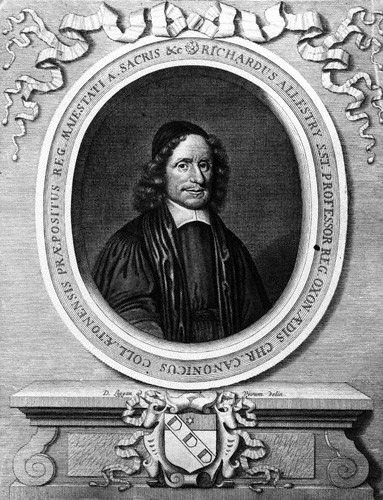
Richard Allestree, 1684 engraving by David Loggan.

Richard Allestree or Allestry (/ˈɔːlstriː/ AWL-stree; 1621/22 – 28 January 1681) was an English Royalist churchman and provost of Eton College from 1665.

== Life ==
The son of Robert Allestree, descended from an old Derbyshire family, he was born at Uppington in Shropshire. Although John Fell gave his birth date as March 1619, this conflicts with his college records. He was educated at the Free School, Coventry, and entered Christ Church, Oxford, under Richard Busby. He entered as a commoner in 1636, matriculating as a student on 17 February 1637 aged fifteen, and took the degree of B.A. in 1640 and that of M.A. in 1643.

In 1642 he joined the king's army, under Sir John Byron. When the parliamentary forces arrived in Oxford, he hid the Christ Church valuables, and the soldiers found nothing in the treasury "except a single groat and a halter at the bottom of a large iron chest". Allestree escaped severe punishment only because the army hastily retreated from the town. He was present at the Battle of Edgehill in October 1642, after which, while hurrying to Oxford to prepare for the king's visit to Christ Church, he was captured by a troop of Lord Say's soldiers from Broughton House, Cambridge, and soon afterwards set free on the surrender of the place to the king's forces. In 1643 he was again on military service, performing "all duties of a common soldier" and "frequently holding his musket in one hand and his book in the other". At the close of the English Civil War, he returned to his studies, took holy orders, was made Censor and became a "noted tutor".

He remained an ardent royalist. He voted for the university decree against the Covenant, and, refusing submission to the parliamentary visitors in 1648, he was expelled. He found a retreat as chaplain in the house of Francis Newport, later Viscount Newport, in whose service he travelled to France. On his return he joined two of his friends, John Dolben and John Fell, afterwards respectively Archbishop of York and Bishop of Oxford, and later joined the household of Sir Antony Cope of Hanwell, near Banbury. He was now frequently employed in carrying despatches between the future Charles II of England and royalist sympathisers. In May 1659 he brought a command from Charles in Brussels, directing Brian Duppa, the Bishop of Salisbury, to summon all bishops to consecrate clergymen to various sees "to secure a continuation of the order in the Church of England", then in danger of becoming extinct.

While returning from one of these missions, in the winter before the Restoration, he was arrested at Dover and committed a prisoner at Lambeth Palace, then used as a jail for royalists, but was freed after a few weeks at the instance, among others, of Lord Shaftesbury. At the Restoration he became canon of Christ Church, D.D. and city lecturer at Oxford. In 1663 he was made chaplain to the king and Regius Professor of Divinity. He was an Arminian discussion partner of the Calvinist Thomas Barlow while at Oxford. In 1665 he was appointed provost of Eton College, and proved himself a capable administrator. He introduced order into the disorganised finances of the college and procured the confirmation of William Laud's decree which reserved five of the Eton fellowships for members of King's College. His additions to the college buildings were less successful: the Upper School constructed by him at his own expense, was falling into ruin almost in his lifetime, and was replaced by the present structure in 1689.

Allestree was buried in the chapel at Eton College, where there is a Latin inscription to his memory.

Allestree bequeathed his library of circa 3500 books to Christ Church, Oxford, where he also served as treasurer, helping the college to recover in the years after the civil war.

== Works ==
His writings are:

- The Privileges of the University of Oxford in point of Visitation (1647) – a tract answered by Prynne in the University of Oxford's Plea Rejected.
- The Gentlemans Calling (1660).
- Various sermons published separately, including A Sermon on Acts xiii. 2 (1660).
- The Government of the Tongue (1667; 1674).
- 18 Sermons whereof 15 Preached before the King [...] (1669).
- The Ladies Calling. In Two Parts. (1673).
- A Paraphrase and Annotations upon All the Epistles of St Paul (joint author with Abraham Woodhead and Obadiah Walker, 1675, see edition of 1853 and preface by W Jacobson).
- 40 Sermons whereof 21 are Now First Published [...] (2 vols., 1684).

In the Cases of Conscience by Thomas Barlow, Bishop of Lincoln (1692), Allestree's judgment on Mr Cottington's Case of Divorce is included. A share in the composition, if not the sole authorship, of the books published under the name of the author of The Whole Duty of Man has been attributed to Allestree (Nichols' Anecdotes, ii. 603), and the tendency of modern criticism is to regard him as the author. His lectures, with which he was dissatisfied, were not published.

Allestree was a man of extensive learning, of moderate views and a fine preacher. He was generous and charitable, of "a solid and masculine kindness," and of a temper hot, but completely under control.

=== Authorities ===
- Wood's Athenae Oxonienses (edited by Bliss), iii. 1269
- Wood's Fasti, i. 480, 514, ii. 57, 241, 370
- Richard Allestree, 40 sermons, with biographical preface by Dr John Fell (2 vols., 1684)
- Sufferings of the Clergy, (1714) by John Walker
- Architectural History of Eton and Cambridge, by R. Willis, i. 420
- History of Eton College, by Sir H. C. Maxwell-Lyte
- History of Eton College, by Lionel Cust (1899)
- Egerton manuscripts, Brit. Mus. 2807 f. 197 b.

Academic offices
| Preceded by William Creed | Regius Professor of Divinity at Oxford; 1663—1680 | Succeeded by William Jane |
| Preceded by John Meredith | Provost of Eton; 1665–1680 | Succeeded by Zachary Cradock |
