= Uckington, Shropshire =

Hamlet in Shropshire, England

Coordinates: 52.684°N 2.627°W

Uckington
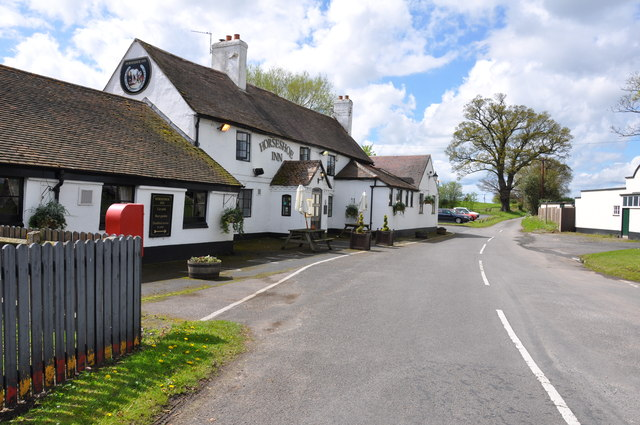
- The Horseshoe Inn public house, Uckington

- Location within Shropshire
- OS grid reference: SJ577098
- Civil parish: Wroxeter and Uppington
- Unitary authority: Shropshire
- Ceremonial county: Shropshire
- Region: West Midlands
- Country: England
- Sovereign state: United Kingdom
- Post town: SHREWSBURY
- Postcode district: SY4
- Dialling code: 01952
- Police: West Mercia
- Fire: Shropshire
- Ambulance: West Midlands
- UK Parliament: Shrewsbury and Atcham

Uckington is a hamlet in the English county of Shropshire located about a mile north-east of Wroxeter village and to the east of Shrewsbury.
