= Napps, Wrotham =

Cricket ground in Wrotham, Kent, England

Napps
- Interactive map of Napps

Ground information
- Location: Wrotham, Kent
- Country: England
- Coordinates: 51.308°N 0.309°E (approx)

Team information
Kent	(1815)
- As of 25 February 2012; Source: CricketArchive

Napps was a cricket ground at Wrotham in Kent. One match took place there in 1815, when Kent played host to England. The only other recorded match at this venue was played the following year between Kent and Wrotham.
