= List of provosts of Eton College =

The provost is the chairman of the governing body of Eton College. He is chosen by the Crown and is assisted by a vice-provost and ten fellows.

== Provosts of Eton ==
=== 15th century ===
- Henry Sever (1440–1442)
- William Waynflete (1442–1447)
- John Clerk (1447)
- William Westbury (1447–1477)
  Thomas Barker (1447) (Note: Elected but refused office)

=== 16th century ===
- Henry Bost (1477–1504)
- Roger Lupton (1504–1535)
- Roger Aldrich (1535–1547)
- Sir Thomas Smith (1547–1554)
- Henry Cole (1554–1559)
- William Bill (1559–1561)
  Richard Bruerne (1561) (Note: Election annulled)
- William Day (1561–1596)

=== 17th century ===
- Sir Henry Savile (1596–1622)
- Sir Thomas Murray (1622–1623)
- Sir Henry Wotton (1624–1639)
- Richard Steward (1639–1644)
- Francis Rous (1644–1659)
- Nicholas Lockyer (1659–1660)
- Nicholas Monck (1660–1661)
- John Meredith (1662–1665)
- Richard Allestree (1665–1680)
- Zachary Cradock (1681–1695)

=== 18th century ===
- Henry Godolphin (1695–1732)
- Henry Bland (1733–1746) previously Head Master 1720–1728
- Stephen Sleech (1746–1765)
- Edward Barnard (1765–1781) previously Head Master 1754–1765
- William Hayward Roberts (1781–1791)

=== 19th century ===
- Jonathan Davies (1791–1809) previously Head Master 1773–1792
- Joseph Goodall (1809–1840) previously Head Master 1802–1809
  John Lonsdale (1840)
- Francis Hodgson (1840–1853)
- Edward Craven Hawtrey (1853–1862) previously Head Master 1834–1853
- Charles Old Goodford (1862–1884) previously Head Master 1853–1862

=== 20th century ===
- James John Hornby (1884–1909) previously Head Master 1868–1884
- Edmond Warre (1909–1918) previously Head Master 1884–1905
- Montague Rhodes James (1918–1936)
- Hugh Cecil, 1st Baron Quickswood (1936–1944) (Note: Styled Lord Hugh Cecil until 1941)
- Sir Henry Marten (1945–1949)
- Sir Claude Aurelius Elliott (1949–1965) previously Head Master 1933–1949
- Harold Caccia, Baron Caccia (1965–1978)
- Martin Charteris, Baron Charteris of Amisfield (1978–1991)
- Sir Antony Acland (1991–2000)

=== 21st century ===
- Sir Eric Anderson (2000–2009) previously Head Master 1980–1994
- William Waldegrave, Baron Waldegrave of North Hill (2009–2024)
- Sir Nicholas Coleridge (2024–present)

== See also ==
- List of Head Masters of Eton College

== Sources ==
- "Provosts of Eton since 1440". Eton College.
- Reddall, Henry Frederic. School-boy Life in Merrie England. New York: Phillips & Hunt; 1888. Pg.95. Print. (List of Provosts of Eton from 1440–1888.)
