= Edward Barnard (provost) =

English cleric and academic

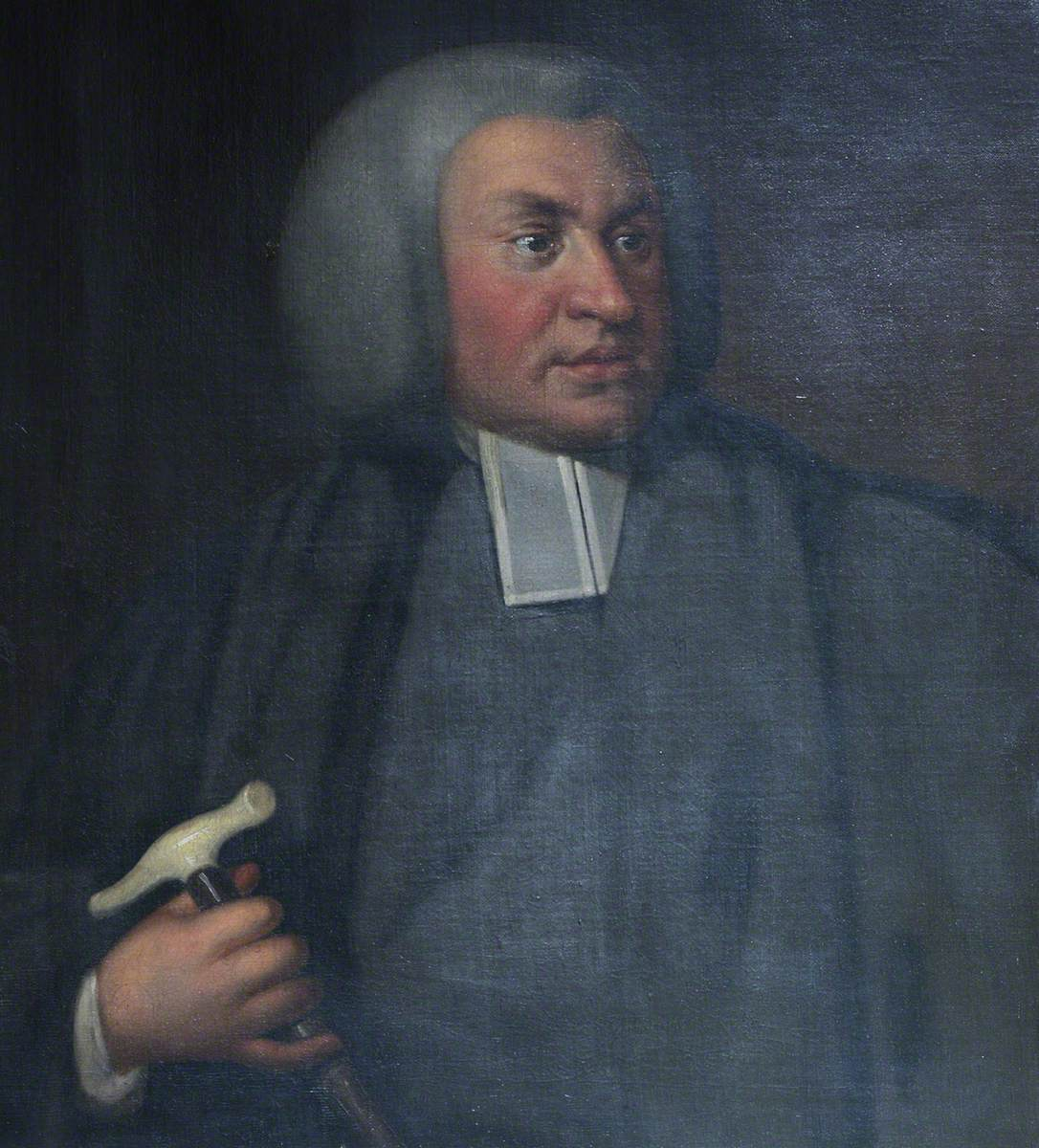
Image of Edward Barnard

Edward Barnard (1717–1781) was an English cleric and academic, provost of Eton from 1764.

== Early life and education ==
Barnard was second son of Rev. George Barnard, of Harpenden, Herts. Rector of Knebworth, 1737, and Luton, 1745–60. He was a foundation scholar at Eton College and, becoming superannuated, entered St John's College, Cambridge, where he graduated B.A. in 1736, M.A. in 1742, B.D. in 1760 and D.D. in 1766. He was fellow of his college from March 1743–4 to 1766. In 1762, he was at Eton as tutor to Henry Townshend, brother to Lord Sydney, and he also became tutor to George Hardinge, afterwards Welsh justice, whose recollections of Barnard are given at length in Nichols's Anecdotes (viii. 543–554).

== Career ==
Barnard succeeded John Sumner as head master of Eton in 1764 and raised the numbers of the school from three hundred to five hundred. He was appointed to a canonry of Windsor in 1761, and in 1764 became provost of Eton. He was also rector of St Paul's Cray, Kent.

"Dr. Barnard, recalled in his memoirs that Fox had been the last boy he had flogged in a long distinguished career: on this occasion Fox’s misdemeanour had been to sneak out of school to attend the theatre in Windsor." Other sources online claim the flogging was on account of his louche appearance on returning from France.

== Death and legacy ==
He died on 18 December 1781. A tablet to his memory, with an inscription, is in Eton College Chapel. Barnard, according to Hardinge, was a man of coarse features and clumsy figure, but with a humour and vivacity which, but for his physical disadvantages, would have made him the equal of Garrick; and he ruled his boys chiefly by force of ridicule. Upon Barnard's death Johnson, according to Mrs Piozzi, pronounced a long eulogium upon his wit, learning, and goodness, and added: "He was the only man that did justice to my good breeding, and you may observe that I am well bred to a needless degree of scrupulosity." He is not to be confused with Thomas Barnard, the bishop of Killaloe and Limerick, who was also a friend of Johnson.

Academic offices
Preceded by John Sumner	Head Master of Eton College; 1754–1765	Succeeded by John Foster
Preceded by Stephen Sleech	Provost of Eton College; 1765–1781	Succeeded by William Hayward Roberts
