= Cornovii (Midlands) =

Celtic people of the Iron Age and Roman Britain

- Territory of the Cornovii

Geography
- Capital: Viroconium (Wroxeter)
- Location: Shropshire; Stoke-on-Trent; Cheshire
- Rulers: None known

The Cornovii were a Celtic people of the Iron Age and Roman Britain, who lived principally in the modern English counties of Cheshire, Shropshire, north Staffordshire, north Herefordshire and eastern parts of the Welsh counties of Flintshire, Powys and Wrexham. Their capital in pre-Roman times was probably a hillfort on the Wrekin. Ptolemy's 2nd-century Geography names two of their towns: Deva Victrix (Chester) and Viroconium Cornoviorum (Wroxeter), which became their capital under Roman rule.

Their territory was bordered by the Brigantes to the North, the Corieltauvi to the East, the Dobunni to the South, and the Deceangli and Ordovices to the West.

The people who inhabited the very north of the British mainland (modern Caithness), and Cornwall were also known by the same name, but according to mainstream or academic opinion were quite separate and unrelated peoples. (see list of ancient Celtic peoples and tribes).

== Nomenclature ==
The first mention of the tribe occurs in the works of Ptolemy in the 2nd century A.D.:

- "From these¹ toward the east are the Cornavi, among whom are the towns: Deva,² Legio XX Victrix 17*30 56°45, Viroconium³ 16*45 55°45." (Ptolemy Geographia II.ii)

The name may mean "People of the Horn". Graham Webster in The Cornovii (1991) cites Anne Ross's hypothesis that the tribal name(s) may be totemic cult-names referring to a "horned god" cult followed by the tribe(s) and although there is no direct evidence of this, Webster points out that it is interesting that at Abbot's Bromley the "Horn Dance" which he believes survived from pagan ritual (something questioned by other folklorists)—Abbot's Bromley being only 35 miles (55 km) north east of the old tribal centre at Wroxeter (Virconium Cornoviorum). In addition, Webster quotes Professor Charles Thomas as having made a "good case" for such totemic ethnonyms in Scotland.

== Archaeological evidence ==
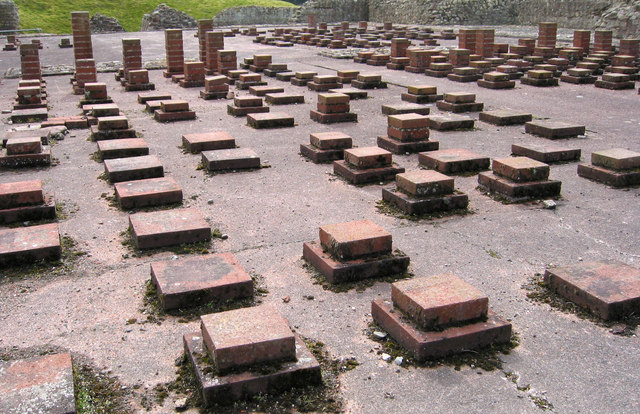
Remains of the Roman hypocaust system at Viroconium

Webster (1991) states that the Cornovii produced little in the way of identifiable ceramic wares. However, recent research at Poulton, Cheshire, has found large amounts (10 kg; 22 lb) of very coarse pottery (VCP), or briquetage. Such pottery is associated with the production, storage and transport of salt. Their sites are identified by construction details of their hillforts and metalwork artefacts. The Cornovii built numerous hill forts, including Titterstone Clee near Bitterley. Old Oswestry hill fort is also thought to have been inhabited by the Cornovii. One of these hill forts is probably that referred to by the historian Tacitus as the last refuge of the resistance led by Caratacus in 50 AD.

=== The tomb of Vedica, a Cornovian woman ===
The tombstone of a thirty-year-old woman of the Cornovii called Vedica was found at Ilkley in Yorkshire outside known Cornovii territory.

DIS MANIBVS VEDIC [...] RICONIS FILIA ANNORVM XXX C CORNOVIA H S E
"To the spirits of the departed and to Vedica,¹ thirty years old, daughter of Virico² of the Cornovii;³ she lies here."

This is the only epigraphic evidence of civilian occupation at Ilkley (Roman Verbeia). Vedica may possibly have been the daughter of a chieftain "Viroco" of the Cornovii, who was killed during the western expansion of early 47 AD commanded by Publius Ostorius Scapula.

== Pre-Roman history ==
Prior to the Roman invasion of Cornovian territory in 47 AD the most significant Cornovian hillforts known were those at Titterstone Clee near Bitterley, being the only one excavated to date, Chesterton Walls near Romsley and Bury Walls near Weston-under-Redcastle. Other hillforts of Iron Age Cornovii include the Wrekin hillfort near Wellington, Caynham Camp near Poughnhill and Old Oswestry. All of these camps are in the county of Shropshire but there was another significant settlement at the Breiddin hillfort in Powys.

Some suggest that a lack of metal and fine pottery finds may be indicative that the Cornovii were not a particularly wealthy or sophisticated British tribe and that they depended mostly on a pastoral economy even though some cultivation of cereal crops appears to have occurred in the river valley areas. However, archaeological evidence from the lowland site at Poulton has shown extensive evidence of metal working and ceramics. In particular, a fine example of the ritual deposition of an iron adze in the ditch of a round house, suggests a significant disposable wealth. These aforesaid lowland areas seem to have been populated by rural peasants who were obliged to pay tribute in cattle and grain to the local chieftains resident in the hillforts.

== Roman period ==
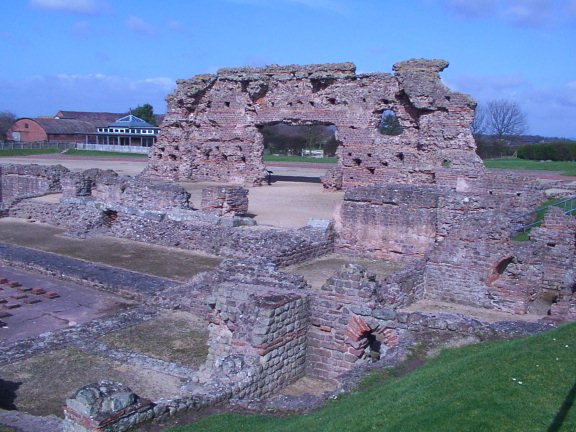
The ruins of the Roman city Viroconium at Wroxeter

The tribal civitas capital was Viroconium Cornoviorum (or simply "Viroconium"), the fourth largest town in Roman Britain. It started life as a legionary fortress in the mid-1st century, possibly garrisoned by the XIV Legion then the XX Legion. The main section of Watling Street runs from Dubrium (Dover) to Viroconium (Wroxeter). The place-name itself is suggestive of the Wrekin hillfort, overlooking the site from the east. The Cornovii seem to have had many hillforts, the largest and most populous being that at the Wrekin near the site of the Romano-British tribal capital.

The eventual size of Viroconium is inconsistent with the estimated population size, taken from the number of known pre-Roman settlements in the area; the archaeological evidence suggests a sparsely populated region. Perhaps the majority of the population lived in timber hut-dwellings without stone foundations, making it more difficult to find archaeological trace. There are, however, impressive standing Roman ruins from Viroconium just outside the modern day village of Wroxeter.

By the time the city had become fully established as a civitas capital, Viroconium had seen great expansion, with all the usual trappings of a classical Roman settlement including the forum basilica, shops and, of course, the baths. Both the massive structural remains of the baths and exercise yard found during archaeological excavations and subsequent research indicate that Viroconium's most prosperous era was between the 2nd and 3rd centuries, and demonstrate the success of this regional economic centre. Nevertheless, it appears that by the 4th century the area was already starting to decline.

Viroconium Cornoviorum and Calleva Atrebatum (Silchester) seem to be the only major Roman settlements in Britain that, subsequently, did not grow into larger towns or cities in the post-Roman period. This may have been due to the foundation of Shrewsbury (probably in the 9th century) nearby, which was more easily defended, although the village of Wroxeter still continued to grow.

Owing to little development in the Wroxeter area, much of the Roman material has survived reasonably intact compared to other parts of Britain. This has led to the town becoming a favourite among archaeologists and students of Roman Britain.

=== Cohors Prima Cornoviorum ===
The Cohors Prima Cornoviorum was the only recorded native British unit known to have served in Britannia. The I Cohort of Cornovii were recruited from the tribe itself, thus bearing the name "Cornoviorum", i.e. "of the Cornovii". The strength of this military unit is unknown. The cohort was an infantry unit and is likely to have numbered only 500. The units formed the late-4th-century garrison of Pons Aelius (Newcastle upon Tyne) at the eastern terminus of Hadrian's Wall. This is recorded in the Notitia Dignitatum.

=== Posting stations, settlements and military stations ===
- Bovium Name could refer to minor settlement near (Tilston, Cheshire) – Named in the Antonine Itinerary. Other candidate for Bovium is the site of the large potteries and tile factory of Legio XX Valeria, at Holt across the river Dee from Farndon, 7 miles south of Chester, in Wales.
- Wilderspool (near Warrington, Cheshire) – Minor settlement on the south bank of the River Dean near its confluence with the Mersey.
- Heronbridge (Cheshire) – On the west bank of the River Dee immediately south of Chester.
- Ffridd (Clwyd) – Fort and substantial Roman constructions near the border with the Deceangli.
- Bravonium (Leintwardine, Herefordshire) – Small roadside town and important military complex on Watling Street West, S of Wroxeter in the Welsh Marches.
- Uxacona (Red Hill, near Oakengates, Shropshire) – Small settlement on Watling Street, east of Wroxeter.
- Pennocrucium (Water Eaton) – Small town and military complex on Watling Street, S of Penkridge.
- Letocetum (Wall, near Lichfield, South Staffordshire) – Small town and military complex S of Lichfield, near the crossing of the Watling and Icknield Streets. Evidently the centre of an administrative pagus, with a substantial public bath-house and a mansio.
- Knighton – It is possible this settlement was created when pre Offa's Dyke earth mounds were built by the Romans.
- Rutunium (Harcourt Park, Shropshire) – A small settlement and posting station on the road north between the military bases at Wroxeter and Chester, at the crossing of the River Roden.
- Mediolanum (Whitchurch) (Shropshire) – Romano-British settlement, whose modern street plan suggests a small walled town.
- Salinae (Middlewich, Cheshire) – Salt-manufacturing town.
- Condate (Northwich, Cheshire) – Salt works probable.
- Levobrinta (Forden Gaer, Powys) – This military site possibly marked the SW border of the Cornovian canton.
- Chesterton (near Newcastle-under-Lyme, Staffordshire) – Small town built on the site of a possible earlier Neronian fort, on the road from Middlewich to Derby.
- Rocester (North Staffordshire) – Small town built on the site of an earlier Flavian fort on the Cornovian borders, with the Brigantes to the north and the Corieltauvi to the east.
- Malpas, Cheshire – Small settlement on the Whitchurch–Chester road.

== Post-Roman history ==
After Roman occupation, the lands of the Cornovii became a centre of military and economic operations. Viroconium Cornoviorum became one of the most important cities in Roman Britain, where Legio XIV Gemina was garrisoned for some time. The Romans also exploited metals such as copper, lead and silver in the area. Some Romanised Cornovii are known to have served as Roman legionaries.

The 5th century saw continued town life in Viroconium but many of the buildings fell into disrepair. However, between 530 and 570 there was a substantial rebuilding programme in timber with most of the old basilica being demolished and replaced with new buildings. These probably included a very large two-storey timber-framed building and a number of storage buildings and houses. In all, 33 new buildings were constructed. The archaeologists responsible for the most recent excavations comment that "their construction was carefully planned and executed... and "were skillfully constructed to Roman measurements using a trained labour force". Who instigated this rebuilding program is not known, although it may have been a bishop. Some of the buildings were renewed three times and the community probably lasted about 75 years until for some reason many of the buildings were dismantled.

== Dark Age period ==
After this period, and with the relentless expansion of Anglian power in the English Midlands, the Cornovian tribal area came under the rule of the Kingdom of Pengwern, although the tribe may have survived into this period as a distinctive polity. Following a period of military alliance with Mercian rulers, particularly King Penda, Pengwern was absorbed by neighbouring Mercia after 642 AD. The local Cornovian people may have continued to reside in the area, perhaps as the Wrekensaete, under Mercian rule.

The site of the Roman city of Viroconium Cornoviorum is known in Old Welsh as Caer Guricon. As Caer Guricon it may have served as capital of the Kingdom of Powys during the sub-Roman period until Anglo-Saxon pressures in the form of Mercian encroachment forced the British to relocate to Mathrafal castle sometime before 717 AD. Pengwern and Powys themselves may have been later divisions of the pre-Roman Cornovii tribal territory whose civitas was Viroconium Cornoviorum. With the passage of time the lesser Magonsæte sub-kingdom also emerged in this area during the period between Powys and Mercian rule.

== The Morris theory: link to Cornwall ==
Although not widely accepted by modern scholarship, John Morris's theory deals with the hypothetical link between the Midlands Cornovii and later Cornwall. In The Age of Arthur, 1973, Morris discussed the Wroxeter dynasty of Constantine whose name is found, albeit indirectly, in a reference by Gildas to Constantine as tyrant whelp of the filthy lioness of Dumnonia i.e. the current areas of Cornwall, Devon and part of Somerset. According to this theory, the principal Cornovian families of Viroconium may have moved to Dumnonia, sometime around 430 AD.

Morris goes on to mention one Ducco, who is also known as Congar, (d. 473 AD) as a monk on the estate that he had also established there. Morris asserts that the latter name is that which is preserved in the modern name of Congresbury, Somerset, south of Bristol. The Cadbury-Congresbury fortification is the only major fortification in Wales and "Dumnonia" to have produced reasonable evidence for continuous occupation from the 3rd century to the sixth.

== Wanborough, Wiltshire ==
In Roman times the settlement at Wanborough was known as Durocornovium and was a little north west of the current position, at a road junction mentioned in the Antonine Itinerary. Being the last vicus on Ermin Way before the scarp slope of the Marlborough Downs, Durocornovium was a site where horses were watered before the steep climb off the Oxfordshire plain. It is not obvious why this name was used as it is a long way from the territories of the two Cornovii tribes.

== DNA Research ==
The Family Tree DNA (FTDNA) project research shows the R-L371 Y Haplogroup has an ~85% probability originating from the Cornovii tribe.

== See also ==
- List of ancient Celtic peoples and tribes
- Dumnonii
- Powys
- Forest of Lyme

== Bibliography ==
- Alcock, Leslie (1987) Economy Society & Warfare among the Saxons and Britons. University of Wales Press, Cardiff.
- Webster, Graham (1991). The Cornovii. Peoples of Roman Britain (revised ed.). Alan Sutton. ISBN 0-86299-877-8.
- White, Roger; Philip Barker (1998) Wroxter: Life & Death of a Roman City. Tempus Publishing. ISBN 978-0-7524-1409-6
- Higham, N.J. (1993), The Origins of Cheshire, Manchester University Press, ISBN 0-7190-3160-5
