= Stapleford Cross =

High cross in Stapleford, Nottinghamshire, England

Coordinates: 52.93134°N 1.27393°W

Grid Reference SK 48903 37350

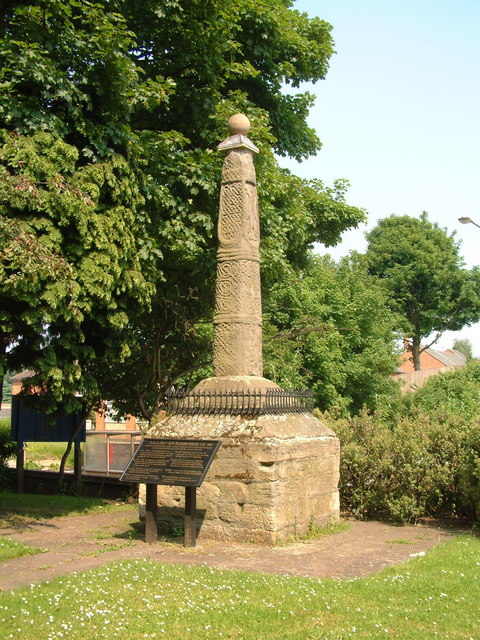
Stapleford Cross

Stapleford Cross is an Anglo-Saxon high cross dating from the eleventh century, now located in the churchyard of St. Helen's Church, Stapleford, in Nottinghamshire, England.

It is Grade I listed, and also a scheduled ancient monument.

== Importance ==
The cross was said by Pevsner to be "by far the most important pre-Conquest monument in Notts".

According to its Historic England list entry:

The cross ... though not in its original location, is an extremely fine example; its carvings are very well-preserved and include an unusual figural carving in addition to the more common interlace.

== Description ==
=== Shape ===
The remains of the cross today consist of a 2.5m high square stone shaft, tapering from 0.5m square at the base to 0.25m at the top.

The lower portion has rounded edges, whilst the top part is more square section, which makes this cross one of the Mercian round-shaft family.

=== Decoration ===
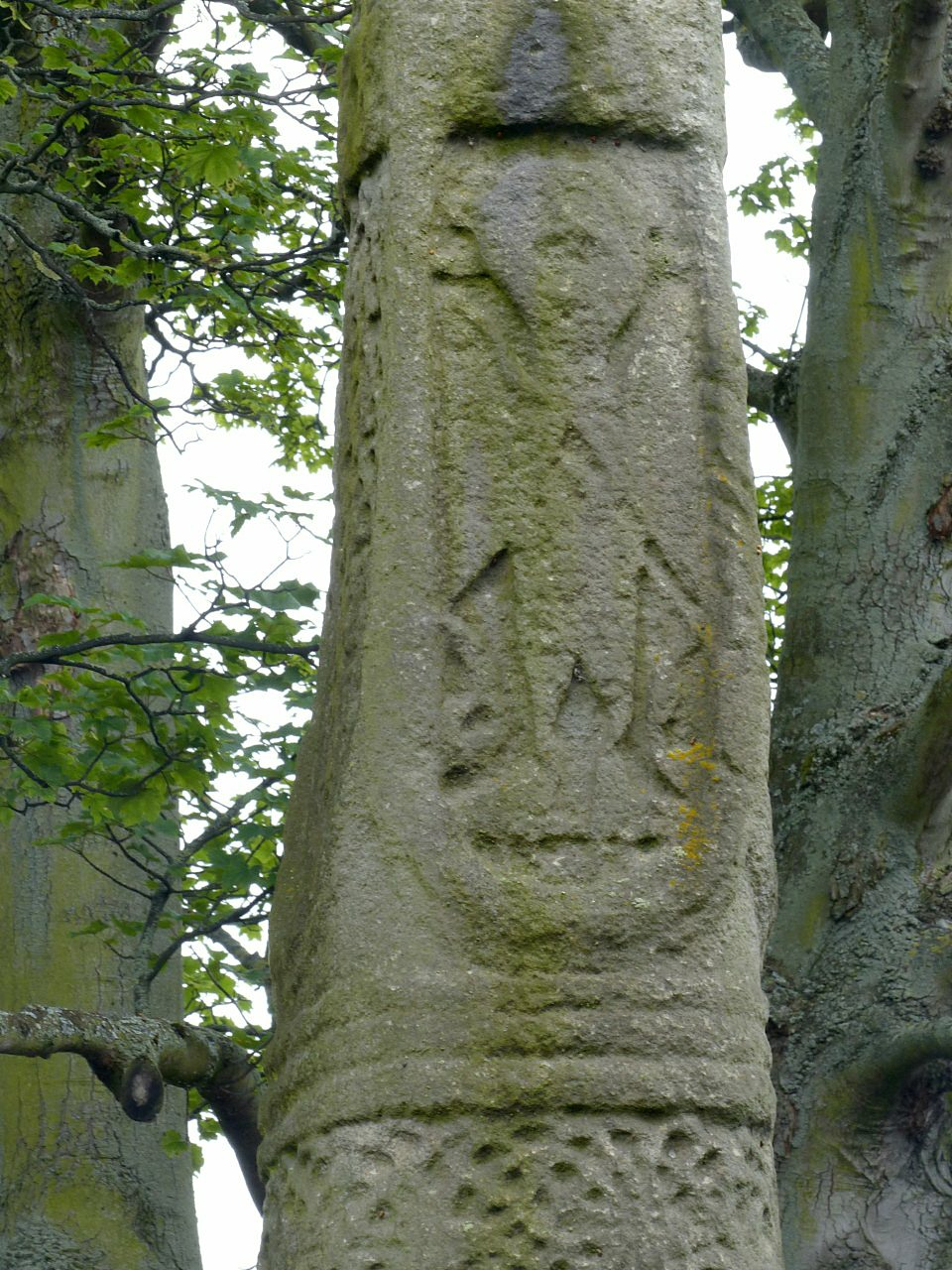
Detail of angel

The shaft is heavily decorated with various forms of interlace, divided into four sections. The third section also displays a winged figure, armed with a spear and presumed to be an archangel, or Luke the Evangelist. (See External link for photo of carved figure.)

According to Kendrick, this dense interlacing is distinctly Mercian in character. It shows similarities to the densely carved Wolverhampton Pillar, and the fine interlacing to be seen on the Brunswick Casket and the Witham Pins. On the other hand, Hill sees a stylistic connection with the Bewcastle Cross in Cumbria, and Byzantine influences.

=== Mounting ===
The cross is now mounted on a nineteenth-century plinth, and is topped by cap and modern ball in place of the original cross-head which was lost in the eighteenth century.

== Origins ==
=== Date ===
The date of the cross in unclear. English Heritage describe it as eleventh-century in one of two listings, but in its other listing they suggest that high crosses of this type are likely to be eighth, ninth or tenth century.

Rev. A.D. Hill suggested (in 1906) a date between 680 and 780 AD, from the ornamentation style and circumstances of the times. This is the date range quoted on the information panel displayed at the site.

Pevsner says that the date may be as late as c.1050.

=== Original location ===
The original position of the cross in unknown, but it is likely to have been nearby.

== Historical record ==
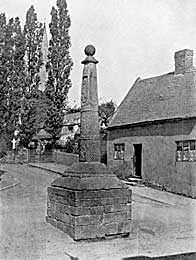
Stapleford Cross in c.1906

The first records of the monument date from the eighteenth century. Before 1760, the cross was lying on its side in the churchyard, around which time the cross-head was removed. With the head, the cross would have been around 3.5m high. In 1760, the cross was re-erected at the junction of Church Street and Church Lane, immediately south east of the churchyard. In 1820, it was installed on a new base at the same location, and topped with a stone cap and ball (pictured). In 1916, the top ball was damaged in a storm. In 1928, the cross together with the 1820 plinth and cap was moved from the street location to the churchyard, where it now stands. In 2000, a new stone ball replaced the one damaged in 1916.

== Other ==
The cross may be the origin of the name 'Stapleford' which means a crossing near a post.
