= Salinae =

Salinae may refer to:

- Roman Middlewich, Cheshire, Great Britain
- Roman Droitwich, Worcestershire, Great Britain
- Roman Ocna Mureș, Romania
- Roman Castellane, Provence
