= Forest of Lyme =

Coordinates: 53.369°N 1.993°W

The Forest of Lyme (pronounced "Lime") is a former, mainly elm tree, forest in the present day counties of Cheshire, Staffordshire and parts of Derbyshire. Parts of the forest remain and its name is preserved in many local place-names.

== Location and toponymy ==
The Forest of Lyme was a historic tract of forest land stretching from Ashton-under-Lyne all the way roughly along Cheshire's border to the town of Audlem on the Cheshire/Shropshire border. Macclesfield Forest is a part of it which remains, although most of it now consists of non-native conifers. It takes in the modern towns and villages of Ashton-under-Lyne, Macclesfield, Lyme, Congleton, Madeley, Newcastle-under-Lyme and others.

It is found in early records of the Honour of Lancaster which refer to those parts of the honour outside Lancashire as being "extra Limam" i.e. beyond the Lyme. Lyme Handley is recorded as "Lyme" in 1313. The name is derived from a Brythonic word for elm which is also the word from which the modern Welsh "llwyf" is derived.

== History ==
In historic times the forest was inhabited by the British Celts who would have been a part of the Cornovii tribe, or more probably the Brigantes tribe. The forest seemed to act as a barrier to Anglo-Saxon conquest of Cheshire because when Cheshire finally came under Anglo-Saxon control, the army which effectively captured it came from the North, Northumbria.

There is also evidence in the continuity of ancient pagan festivals into the modern age as well. One of these was Beltaine, practised around Leek. Another pagan custom that formerly took place in the Forest of Lyme is well dressing. This practice, which is also associated with Derbyshire, is known to have been performed in Rushton Spencer near Biddulph. Indeed, many pagan festivals have been Christianized and continue to be carried out.

There is also some evidence for the towns and land located around Biddulph and Leek as formerly belonging to Cheshire in the early Middle Ages.

Today the forest survives as large tracts of ancient woodland, particularly in the valley of the River Dane, the Western Peak District and in a few other areas.

== Name in modern place-names ==
The name "Lyme" is preserved in various forms in many local place-names. These include:

- Ashton-under-Lyne (a corruption of "Lyme")
- Audlem (Old Lyme or perhaps Alda's Lyme)
- Burslem (Burgheard's Lyme)
- Lyme Park near Disley
- Lyme Handley, Sutton (unofficially called Lyme Green)
- Newcastle-under-Lyme

== See also ==
- Tilia: Lime tree.
