= Viroconium Cornoviorum =

Ancient Roman city in Shropshire, England

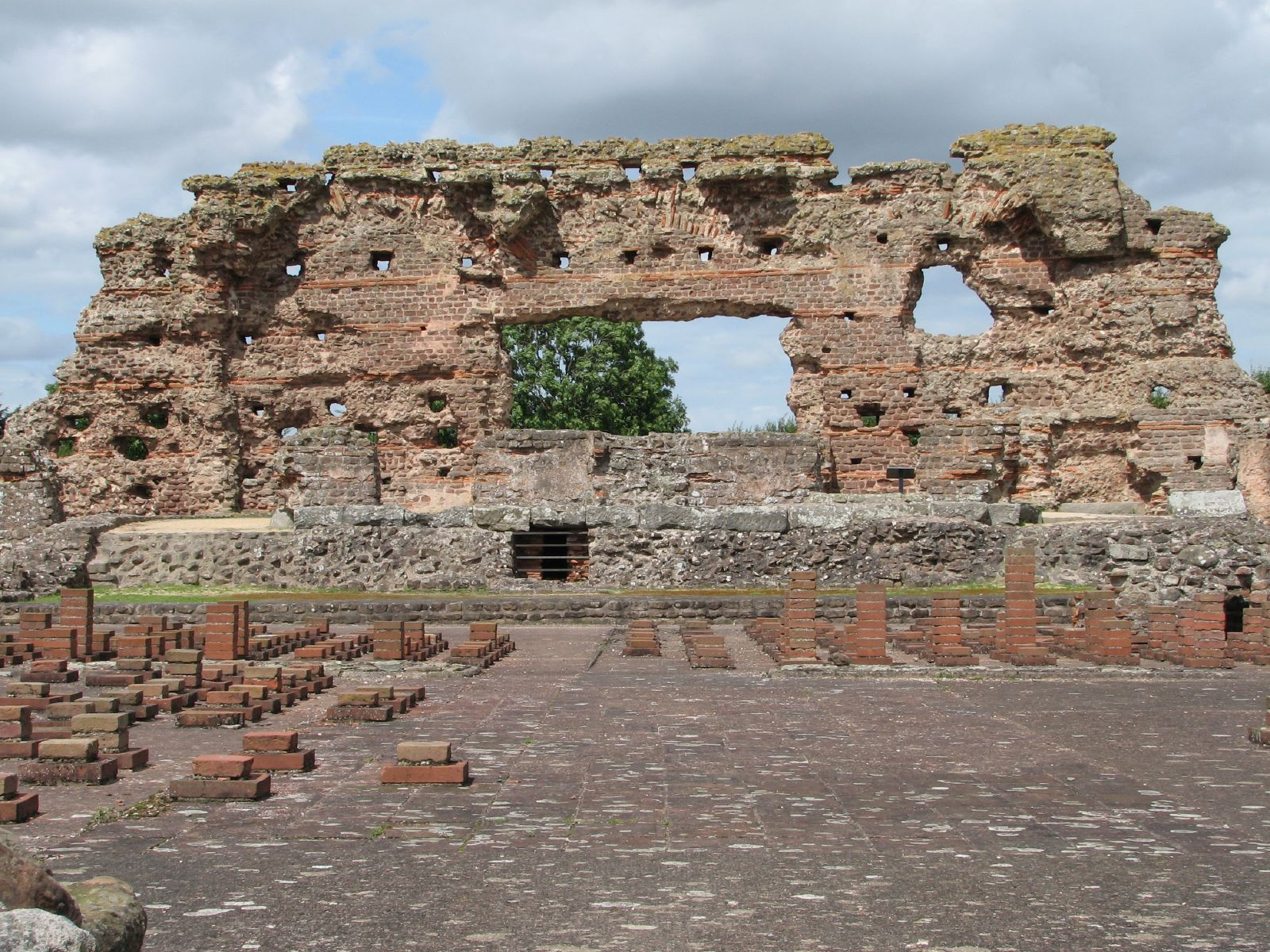
- Remains of the public baths, known as "The Old Work"

- Location within Shropshire
- 52°40′27″N 02°38′39″W
- Type: Settlement
- Location: Wroxeter, Shropshire, England
- Region: Britannia

Watling Street north of St Albans. The map shows the Roman towns established along Watling Street by the end of the first century AD.

Viroconium or Uriconium, formally Viroconium Cornoviorum, was a Roman city, one corner of which is now occupied by Wroxeter, a small village in Shropshire, England, about 5 miles (8 km) east-south-east of Shrewsbury. At its peak, Viroconium is estimated to have been the 4th-largest Roman settlement in Britain, a civitas with a population of more than 15,000. The settlement probably lasted until the end of the 7th century or the beginning of the 8th. Extensive remains can still be seen, in the care of English Heritage, with an on-site Museum and reconstructed Roman house.

== Toponym ==
Viroconium is a Latinised form of a toponym that was reconstructed as Common Brittonic *Uiroconion ("[city] of *Uirokū"). *Uirokū (lit. "man-wolf") is believed to have been a masculine given name meaning "werewolf".

The original capital of the local British tribe of the Cornovii was the impressive hillfort on the Wrekin known as *Uiroconion. When the Cornovii were eventually subdued by the Romans, their capital was moved to Wroxeter and given its Roman name. Hence the term "Cornoviorum" distinguishes the site as the Viroconium "of the Cornovii", the Celtic tribe whose settlement became civitas.

The city is mentioned by the Roman historians Ptolemy, Suetonius, and others.

== History ==
=== Roman ===
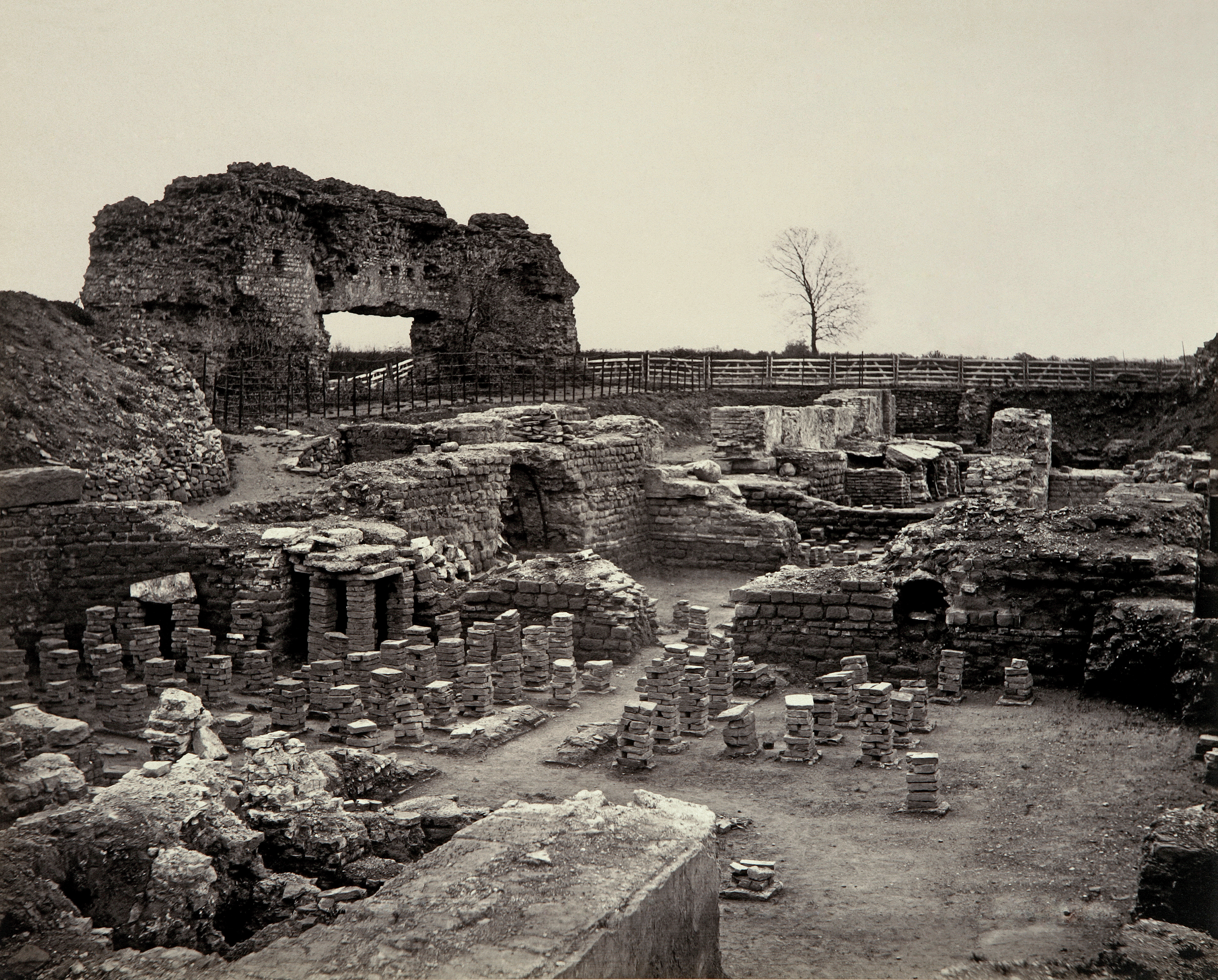
Roman ruins at Viroconium Cornoviorum, photographed during excavation by Francis Bedford and digitally restored. According to English Heritage, the photograph dates to 1859 and none of the hypocaust system extant in this photograph has survived today as the modern pilae stacks are replicas of the originals, which were taken by souvenir hunters during the late 19th century.

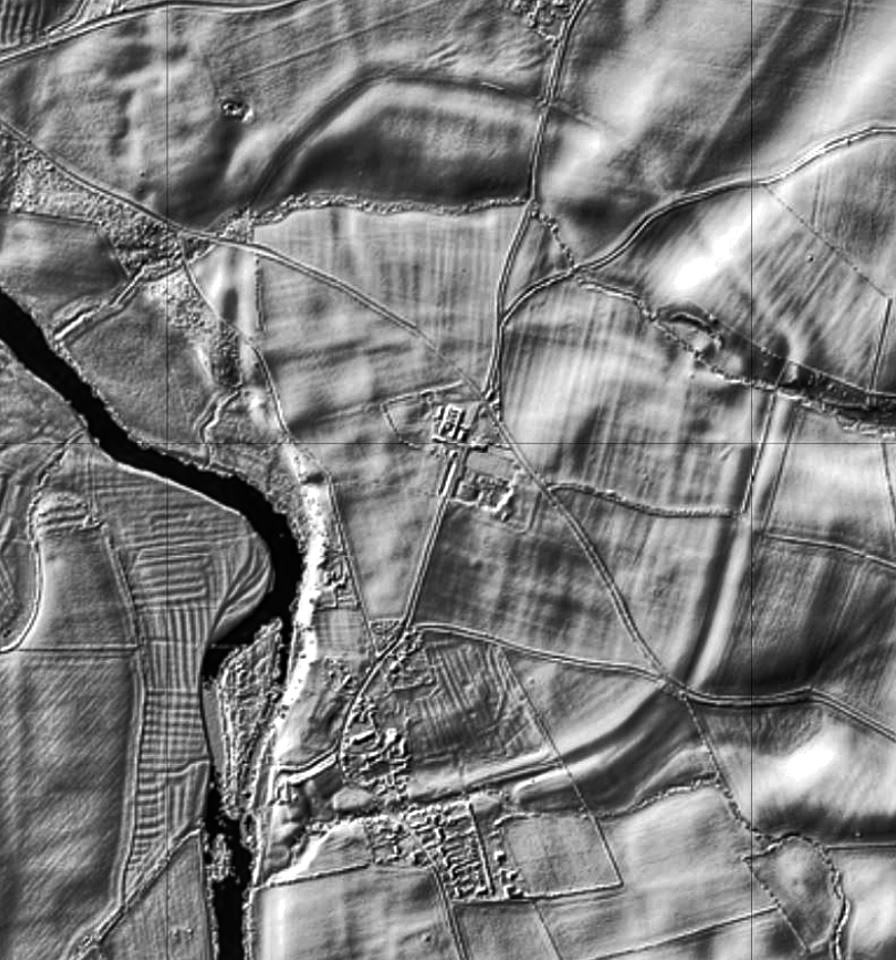
A lidar view of Viroconium Cornoviorum and the remains of the city wall

Wroxeter was first established in the early years of the Roman conquest of Britain as a frontier post for a cohort of Thracian Auxilia who were taking part in the campaigns of the governor, Publius Ostorius Scapula. The site is strategically located near the end of Watling Street, the primary Roman trunk road that ran across Britannia from Dubris (Dover). The post was a key frontier position because it defended the River Severn valley as it comes out of Cambria (Wales) as well as protecting the route to the south that leads to the Wye valley.

In the mid 1st century Caesar's Legio XIV Gemina took over the site from the Thracian Auxilia in preparation for the invasion of Wales and replaced the fort with a much larger legionary fortress. In 78 governor Gnaeus Julius Agricola led campaigns to suppress the tribes in North Wales and the druids on Ynys Môn. In 80 Agricola took Legio XIV Gemina north on his punitive expeditions against the Picts in Scotland. With the departure of Legio XIV Gemina, Legio XX Valeria Victrix took over the fortress.

By the late 80s the fort had ceased to be used by the Roman army after Legio XX Valeria Victrix moved to Deva Victrix (Chester). In this period the canabae, or civilian settlement, that had grown up around the legionary fort began turning it into a town. Archaeological research has found that an unfinished legionary bath house in the centre of the town eventually became the town's forum. A decade later a civic street grid was subsuming the plan of the old legionary fort.

The colonnaded forum was started in the 120s covering the unfinished bath house, and with the impressive dedicatory inscription to Emperor Hadrian found in excavations dating the completion to 130. By then the town had expanded especially under Emperor Hadrian to cover an area of more than 173 acres (70 ha). It then had many public buildings, including thermae. Simpler temples and shops have also been excavated. At its peak, Viroconium is estimated to have been one of the richest and the fourth largest Roman settlement in Britain with a population of more than 15,000. Its wealth is surprising for what remained a frontier town and is perhaps explained by its access to Wales and to other trade routes.

Between 165 and 185 the forum burned down, including neighbouring shops and houses, and many shop contents were subsequently found in excavations. The forum was rebuilt with several modifications.

=== Early medieval period ===
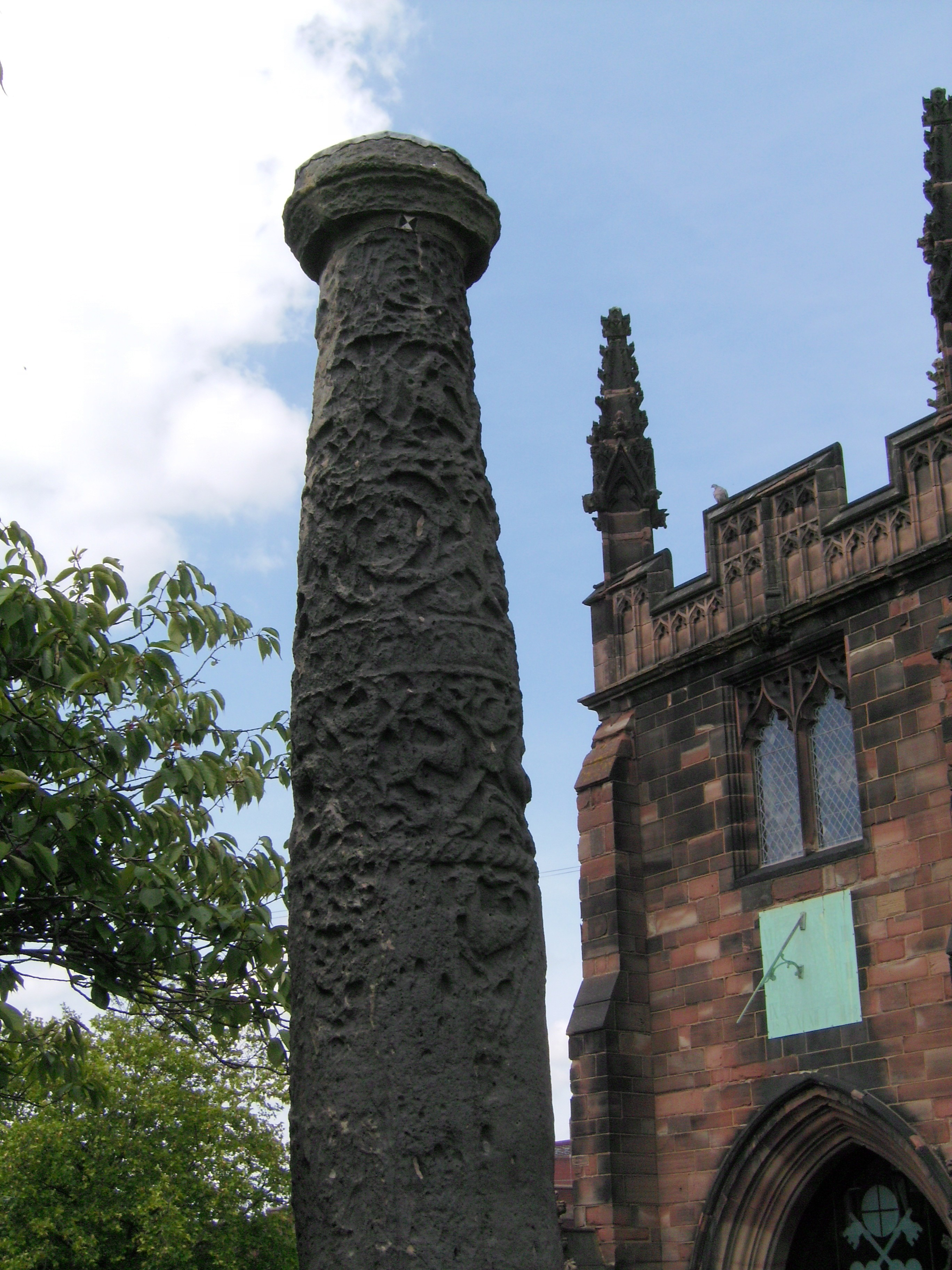
Shaft of an Anglo-Saxon cross possilbly taken from the Forum or Basilica of the Baths; constructed c. 100–150 AD and transported to Wolverhampton c. 996 AD

Although Viroconium identified with the ancient Welsh cities of Cair Guricon and its variants which appeared in the Historia Brittonum's list of the 28 civitates of Britain, became the site of the court of a sub-Roman kingdom known as Powys, which was the successor territorial unit to the Cornovii tribal kingdom, whose second capitale was known as Llys Pengwern (maybe the Berth hillfort).

Though many of the buildings fell into disrepair, the urban life continued well into the fifth century. The Wroxeter Stone or Cunorix Stone shows this. Found in 1967, with an inscription in an Insular Celtic language, identified by the Celtic Inscribed Stones Project (CISP) at UCL as "partly-Latinized Primitive Irish"., it is probably a re-used gravestone dated to 460-475 AD, when Irish raiders had begun to make permanent settlements in South Wales and south-western Britain.

By the 6th century, most Roman urban sites and villas in Britain were being abandoned but the town between 530 and 570 underwent a substantial rebuilding programme. The old basilica was carefully demolished and replaced with new timber-framed buildings on rubble platforms. These probably included a very large two-storey building and a number of storage buildings and houses. In all, 33 new buildings were "carefully planned and executed" and "skillfully constructed to Roman measurements using a trained labour force". Who instigated this rebuilding programme is not known, but it may have been a bishop. Some of the buildings were renewed three times, and the community probably lasted about 75 years until, for some reason, many of the buildings were dismantled.

The site was probably abandoned peacefully in the second half of the seventh century or the beginning of the eighth. There is a tradition that Shrewsbury was "founded on occasion of the decay of the Roman Uriconium." Historian John Wacher suggests that Shrewsbury may have been refortified by refugees fleeing an outbreak of a plague in Viroconium around this time.

In 656, Oswiu conquered Llys Pengwern and Shropshire became part of the Wreocensæte ('inhabitants of Wroxeter' in old english), a sub-kingdom of the Angles.

== Preservation ==
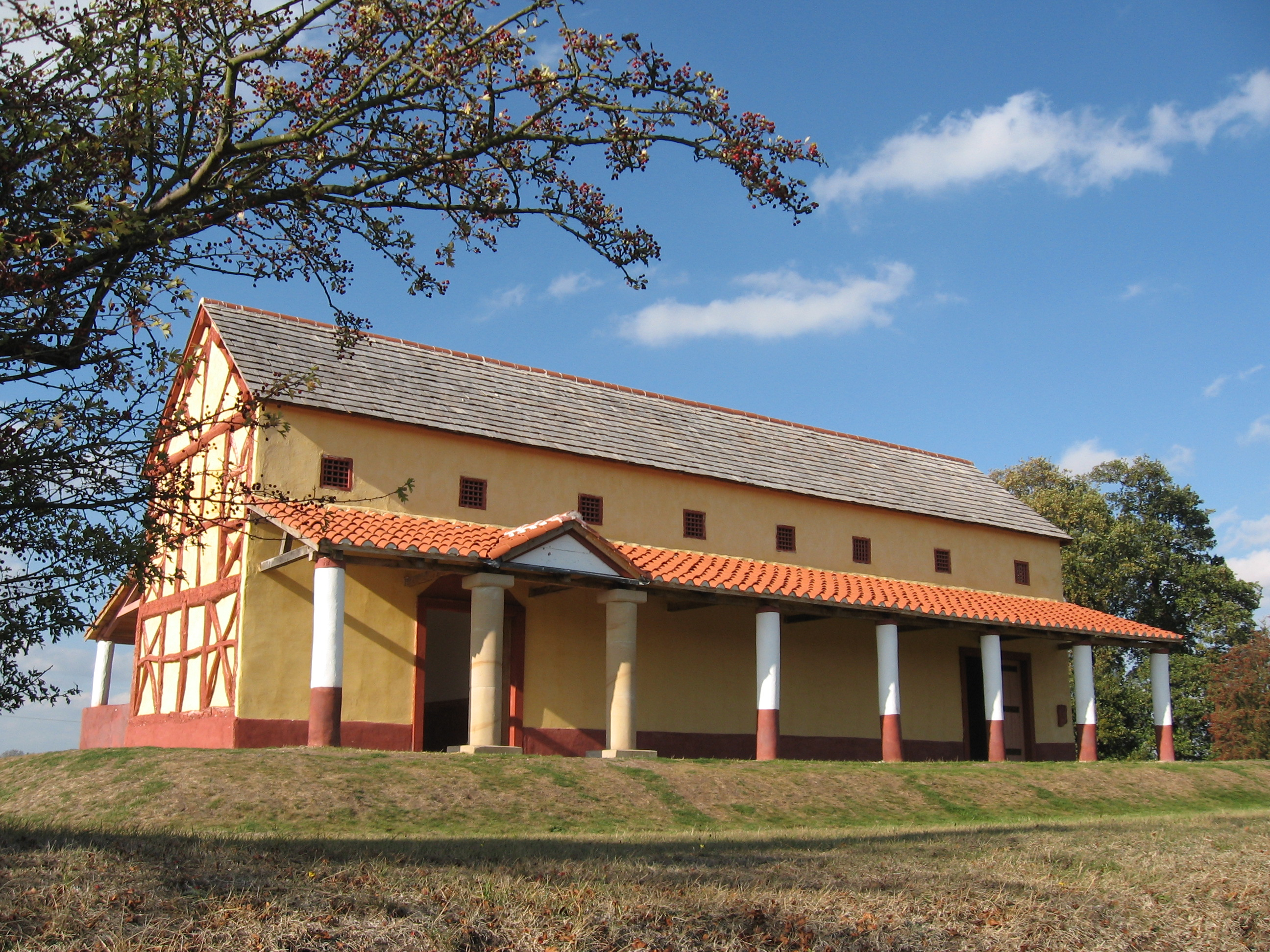
The recreation of a Roman town house at Viroconium

Although archaeologist Philip A. Barker believed stonework from Viroconium Cornoviorum was used to build the nearby parish churches of Atcham, Wroxeter, and Upton Magna, some substantial remains are still standing. These include "the Old Work" (an archway, part of the baths' frigidarium and the largest free-standing Roman ruin in England) and the remains of a baths complex. These are on display to the public and, along with a small museum, are looked after by English Heritage under the name "Wroxeter Roman City". Some of the more important finds are housed in the Music Hall Museum in Shrewsbury. Most of the town still remains buried, but it has largely been mapped through geophysical survey and aerial archaeology.

Archaeological research of the site is ongoing with further buildings being excavated. In 2024, archaeologists uncovered a 2,000-year-old mosaic depicting dolphins and fish.

=== Reconstructed villa ===
In February 2011 a reconstructed Roman villa was opened to the public to give visitors an insight into Roman building techniques and how the Romans lived. A Channel 4 television series entitled Rome Wasn't Built in a Day showed how it was built using authentic ancient techniques. The builders were assisted by a team of local volunteers and supervised by archaeologist Dai Morgan Evans, who designed the villa.

== Bibliography ==
- Aston, Michael; Bond, James (1976). The Landscape of Towns. Archaeology in the Field Series. London: J.M. Dent & Sons Ltd. pp. 45–48, 51–54. ISBN 0-460-04194-0.
- Anderson, J. Corbet. The Roman City of Uriconium at Wroxeter, Salop. – Illustrative of the History and Social Life of Our Romano-British Forefathers. London: J. Russell Smith, 1867.
- Atkinson, Donald. Report on the Excavations at Wroxeter (the Roman City of Viroconium) in the County of Salop, 1923–1927. Oxford: Oxford University Press, 1942.
- Barker, Philip, Ed. Wroxeter Roman City: Excavations 1966–1980. London: Her Majesty's Stationery Office, 1980.
- Barker, Philip, and Webster, Graham. From Roman Viroconium to medieval Wroxeter: recent work on the site of the Roman city of Wroxeter. Worcester: West Mercian Archaeological Consultants, 1990. ISBN 0-9516274-1-4
- Barker, Philip, and White, Roger. Wroxeter Roman City (English Heritage Guidebooks). Swindon, Wilts.: English Heritage, 1999. ISBN 1850746982
- Barker, Philip; White, Roger; Corbishley, Mike (1998). The Baths Basilica, Wroxeter: excavations 1966–90. Swindon: English Heritage. ISBN 1850745285.
- Bushe-Fox, J. P. Excavations on the Site of the Roman Town at Wroxeter, Shropshire, in 1912 (Society of Antiquaries of London. Research Committee. Report no. 1). Oxford: Society of Antiquaries, 1913.
- Bushe-Fox, J. P. Excavations on the Site of the Roman Town at Wroxeter, Shropshire, in 1913: Second Report (Society of Antiquaries of London. Research Committee. Report no. 2). Oxford: Society of Antiquaries, 1915.
- Bushe-Fox, J. P. Excavations on the Site of the Roman Town at Wroxeter, Shropshire, in 1914: Third Report (Society of Antiquaries of London. Research Committee. Report no. 4). Oxford: Society of Antiquaries, 1916.
- De la Bedoyere, Guy. (1991). The Buildings of Roman Britain.
- Ellis, Peter. The Roman Baths and Macellum at Wroxeter. Swindon, Wilts.: English Heritage, 2000. ISBN 978-1-85074-606-5
- Ellis, Peter, and White, Roger. 'Wroxeter Archaeology Excavation and Research on the Defences and in the Town – 1968–1992.' in Transactions of the Shropshire Archaeological and Historical Society, Vol. 78. Shrewsbury, Shrops.: Shropshire Archaeological Society, 2006. ISBN 0-9501227-8-5
- Fox, George E. A Guide to the Roman City of Uriconium at Wroxeter, Shropshire. Wellington, Shrops.: Shropshire Archaeological Society, 1927.
- Frere, S. S. Britannia: a History of Roman Britain. London: Routledge & Kegan Paul Ltd., 1987. ISBN 0-7102-1215-1
- Gaffney, V. L., and White, R. H. (2007). 'Wroxeter, the Cornovii, and the Urban Process: Final Report on the Wroxeter Hinterland Project 1994–1997', Journal of Roman Archaeology Supplementary Series, No. 68.
- Jackson, Kenneth (1970). "An Appendix on the Place Names of the British Section of the Antonine Itinerary". Britannia. 1.
- Kenyon, Kathleen M. Excavations at Viroconium, 1936–1937. Shrewsbury, Shrops. Shropshire Archaeological Society, 1937.
- Rivet, A. L. F., and Smith, Colin. (1979). The Place-Names of Roman Britain.
- Urban, Sylvanus. 'The Roman City of Uriconium.' Gentleman's Magazine and Historical Review, 1859. 206: 447–458.
- Webster, Graham. The Cornovii. London: Sutton, 1991. ISBN 0-86299-877-8
- Webster, Graham. The Legionary Fortress at Wroxeter: Excavations by Graham Webster, 1955–1985. Swindon, Wilts.: English Heritage, 2002. ISBN 9781850746850
- Webster, Graham. The Roman Army. London: Grosvenor Museum, 1973. ISBN 0-903235-05-6
- Webster, Graham, The Roman Imperial Army: Of the First and Second Centuries A.D. Norman: University of Oklahoma Press, 1998. ISBN 0-8061-3000-8
- Webster, Graham, and Barker, Philip. Viroconium, Wroxeter Roman City. London: Her Majesty's Stationery Office, 1966 & 1978. ISBN 0-11-670323-7
- White, Roger H.; Barker, Philip (1998). Wroxeter: Life and Death of a Roman City. Tempus. ISBN 978-0-7524-1409-6.
- White, Thomas. A Guide to the Ruins of Uriconium, at Wroxeter, Near Shrewsbury. Kessinger Publishing, 2009, ISBN 978-1-120-28973-5. BiblioBazaar, 2010, ISBN 978-1-143-79640-1. Nabu Press, 2010, ISBN 978-1-143-63705-6
- White, Thomas. Uriconium; A Historical Account of the Ancient Roman City, and of the Excavations Made Upon Its Site, at Wroxeter, in Shropshire. General Books, 2010. ISBN 1152210491
