= Wolverhampton Pillar =

Structure from Anglo-Saxon era

Coordinates: 52.586621°N 2.128087°W

Grid Reference SO 91419 98765

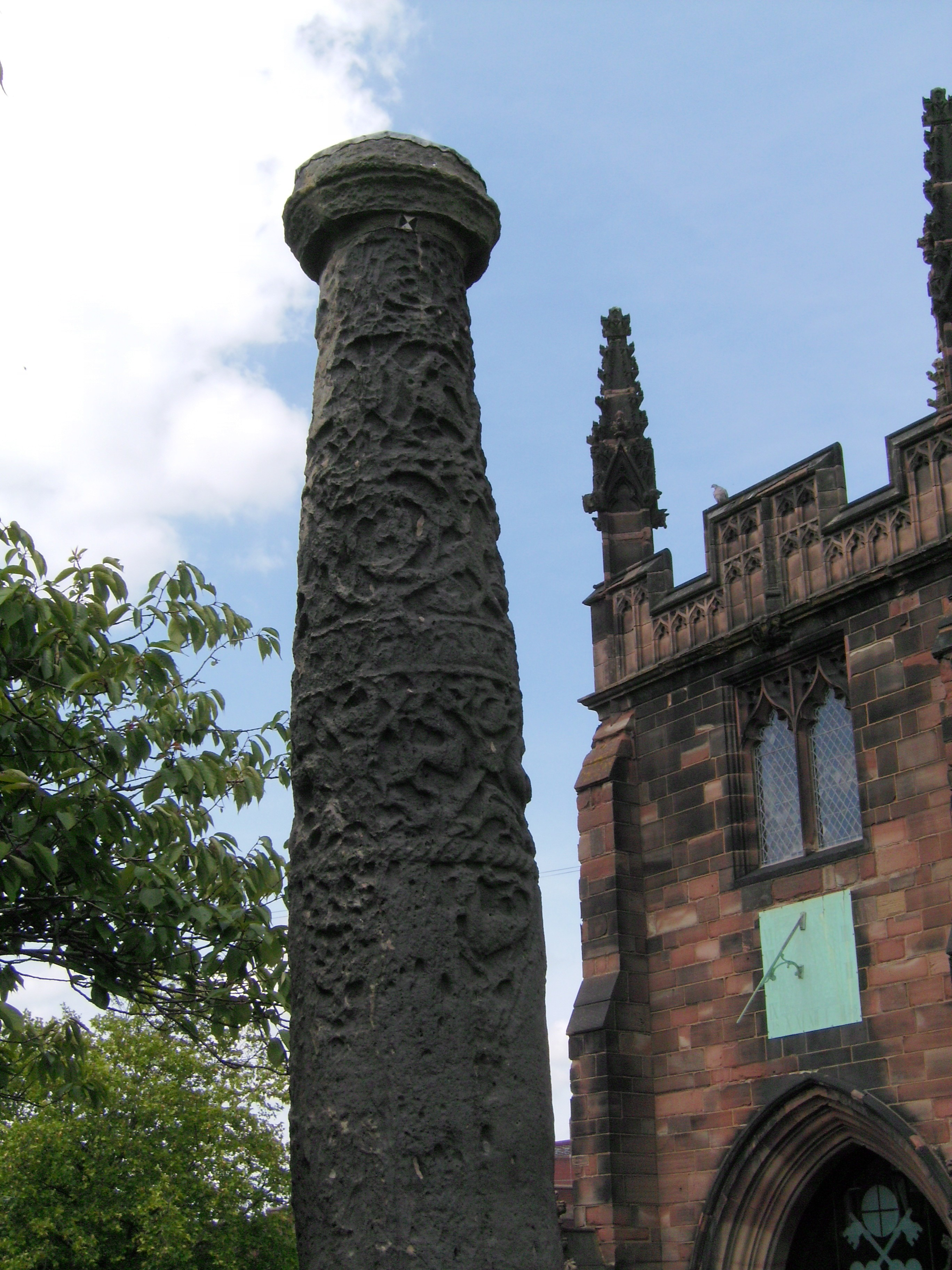
The Wolverhampton Pillar

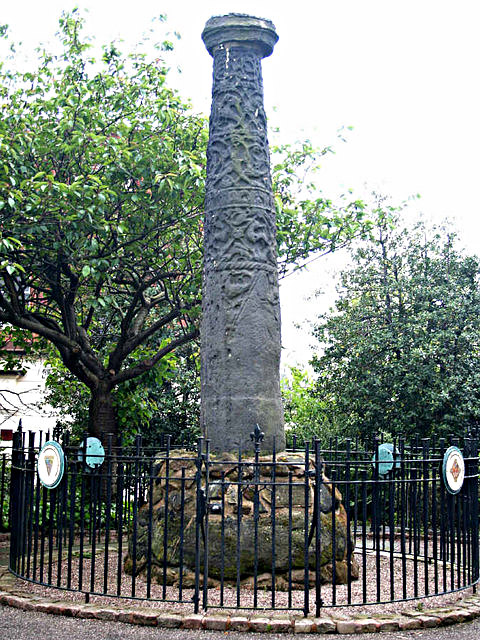
Detail of carvings

The Wolverhampton Pillar is the shaft of an Anglo-Saxon High cross, dating from the ninth or tenth centuries AD.

The scheduled monument is still standing in its original location, in what is now the churchyard of St Peter's Collegiate Church, in Wolverhampton, England.

== Description ==
The decoration is of an extremely rare type, and has survived the effects of weathering comparatively well. It consists of seven bands, depicting vine scrolls, various animals, acanthus, and lattice-work.

Kendrick (1938) considered the decoration to be unique; the only surviving example in England which demonstrated the southern continental Baroque style. He also thought (1949) that it illustrated "a taste for a crowded display of finicky decoration", which is also reflected in the later Stapleford Cross.

== History ==
Phyllis Nicklin, of the University of Birmingham, notes that the 14-foot high shaft is of similar size to the columns of the forum at the Roman city of Viriconium, near Wroxeter, and speculates that the shaft may have been taken from there by the Anglian carvers. If so, the shaft would have been quarried c. 100-150 AD.

The carving is Anglo-Saxon, but the date is uncertain. The cross may have been carved and erected around 850 AD, or more probably from around AD 996 when a college was founded at this site.

A plaster cast of the Pillar was created for the Victoria and Albert Museum in 1877.

An excavation by Michael M. Rix in 1949 revealed that the pillar is still standing on its original Saxon foundation, consisting of a stepped base approximately 2.4m in diameter, located one metre below the present ground level. At some later date, the base of the pillar has been propped up with mortared rubble.
