= Listed buildings in Stapleford, Nottinghamshire =

Stapleford is a civil parish in the Borough of Broxtowe, Nottinghamshire, England. The parish contains 17 listed buildings that are recorded in the National Heritage List for England. Of these, one is listed at Grade I, the highest of the three grades, one is at Grade II*, the middle grade, and the others are at Grade II, the lowest grade. The parish contains the town of Stapleford, and a high proportion of the listed buildings consist of former framework-knitting cottages and workshops, which are concentrated around Nottingham Road. The other listed buildings include a church, an Anglo-Saxon cross in the churchyard, and the gates at the churchyard entrance, a former Wesleyan chapel, a school and associated structures, and a cemetery chapel and mortuary.

== Key ==
Grade	Criteria
I	Buildings of exceptional interest, sometimes considered to be internationally important
II*	Particularly important buildings of more than special interest
II	Buildings of national importance and special interest

== Buildings ==
Name and location	Photograph	Date	Notes	Grade
Anglo Saxon Cross; 52.93137°N 1.27391°W		9th century (probable)	The cross is in the churchyard of St Helen's Church, it is in gritstone and 10 feet (3.0 m) high. The cross is rectangular at the base, it tapers and rises to be circular, and has a lead cap. It has dense interlace carving, and a panel carved with an angel and a serpent. Around the base is spiked iron railing.	I
St Helen's Church; 52.93147°N 1.27465°W		13th century	The church has been altered and extended through the centuries, it was restored in 1877, and the memorial chapel designed by T. G. Jackson was added in 1923. It is built in stone with slate roofs, and consists of a nave with a clerestory, north and south aisles, a south porch, a chancel, vestries, a memorial chapel, and a west steeple. The steeple has a tower with two stages, clasping buttresses, a plinth, a west doorway with a hood mould, a string course, coved eaves, an embattled parapet, and a recessed octagonal spire with a weathercock. There is also an embattled parapet along the nave. The east window has five lights with intersecting tracery and a quatrefoil head.	II*
289 Derby Road; 52.93341°N 1.25799°W		Mid 18th century	The house is in whitewashed brick, and has tile roofs with shouldered coped gables, the east one with ball finials. There are two storeys and an L-shaped plan, with a front range of three bays, and a lean-to rear extension. On the front is a central doorway with a hood, and the windows are a mix of horizontally-sliding sashes and casements, those on the ground floor with segmental heads.	II
Stapleford House Education Centre; 52.93207°N 1.26912°W		1782	Originally a Wesleyan chapel, later used for other purposes, it is in colourwashed rendered brick, on a plinth, with sill and lintel bands, corner pilasters, and a slate roof with a pedimented coped gable containing an inscribed and dated tablet. There are two storeys and fronts of three bays. On the front are a doorway with a fanlight and sash windows, all with round-arched heads.	II
106–112 Nottingham Road; 52.93212°N 1.26534°W		Early 19th century	A row of framework knitters' cottages, later four houses, in brick, partly rendered, with dentilled eaves and a slate roof. There are three storeys, four bays, a two-storey single-bay extension on the right, and a continuous two-storey lean-to at the rear. The windows are three-light horizontally-sliding sashes, in the lower two storeys each bay has a single window with a segmental rubbed brick head, and in the top floor each bay has two windows with flat heads. The doorway also have segmental rubbed brick heads.	II
119 and 121 Nottingham Road; 52.93229°N 1.26483°W		Early 19th century	A pair of framework knitters' cottages, later two houses, in brick on a plinth, with dentilled eaves and a slate roof. There are three storeys and two bays. In the centre are doorways with splayed lintels. The windows are casements, in the lower two floors each house has one window with a rubber brick segmental head, and in the top floor are two windows with flat heads.	II
80 and 82 Nottingham Road and wall 52.93215°N 1.26786°W		1836	A pair of lodges associated with St John's Primary School, they are in brick, each on a stone plinth, with stone dressings, quoins, and slate roofs with coped gables and bargeboards. Each lodge has two storeys and two bays, and most of the windows are mullioned casements with hood moulds. Between the lodges is a brick boundary wall with a plinth and gabled stone coping, containing two pairs of stone gate piers, the two on the right with pyramidal caps.	II
St John's Primary School; 52.93191°N 1.26765°W		1836	The school, designed by T. C. Hine, is in brick on a stone plinth, with stone dressings, quoins, and slate roofs. It is in one and two storeys, and has nine bays, the middle and outer bays projecting and gabled. The middle bay contains a canted bay window, to its right is a doorway with a Tudor arch, and most of the other windows are mullioned casements with hood moulds.	II
Frameshop at rear of 124 Nottingham Road; 52.93186°N 1.26459°W	—	c. 1840	The workshop is in brick with dentilled eaves, and gabled slate and flat concrete roofs. There are two storeys and three bays. It contains casement windows and large horizontally-sliding sash windows, and doorways with round and segmental heads.	II
140 Nottingham Road; 52.93199°N 1.26393°W		c. 1840	A brick cottage, partly rendered, on a plinth, with stucco dressings, dentilled eaves and a tile roof. There are two storeys and two bays. The central doorway has a fanlight, the windows on the front are sashes, and the ground floor openings have lintels with keystones. In the gable ends are casement windows, and on the right is a wooden garage with a slate roof.	II
Cloud Villa and workshop 52.93192°N 1.26555°W	—	c. 1840	A house and a workshop in brick, partly colourwashed, on a rendered plinth, with dentilled eaves and roofs of slate and tile. There are two storeys and an L-shaped plan, with a front of two bays and five bays on the sides. In the centre is a Classical doorway with a fanlight, the windows on the front are sashes, and the ground floor openings have stuccoed lintels with keystones. At the rear, the house and workshop have casement windows, some with segmental heads, and various doorways.	II
114 and 116 Nottingham Road; 52.93211°N 1.26509°W		Mid 19th century	A pair of mirror-image houses in brick, partly rendered, with dentilled eaves and a slate roof. There are two storeys and two bays. The doorways are in the centre, the windows are casements imitating sashes, and the ground floor openings have stuccoed splayed lintels with keystones.	II
118 and 120 Nottingham Road; 52.93209°N 1.26495°W		Mid 19th century	A pair of framework knitters' cottages, later two houses, in brick, partly rendered, on a plinth, with dentilled eaves and a slate roof. There are three storeys, three bays, and rear extensions. In the centre is a blocked tunnel entry, flanked by doorways, each with an ogee-headed shoe scraper. The windows in the lower two floors are cross-casements, and all the openings in the lower two floors have splayed lintels with keystones. In the top floor are two three-light casement windows on the left and two three-light horizontally-sliding sash windows on the right.	II
122 Nottingham Road; 52.93202°N 1.26474°W		Mid 19th century	A framework knitter's cottage, later a house, in brick, partly rendered, with dentilled eaves and a tile roof. There are three storeys, two bays, and a small rear lean-to. In the left bay is a doorway, the windows in the lower two floors are casements, and all these openings have splayed lintels with keystones. In the top floor are three-light horizontally-sliding sash windows.	II
124 Nottingham Road; 52.93202°N 1.26458°W		Mid 19th century	A framework knitter's cottage, later a house in brick, with stone dressings and a tile roof. There are two storeys and attics, three bays, and a workshop at the rear. The windows are a mix of horizontally-sliding sashes and casements, and to the left is a round-headed carriage entrance with imposts and a keystone. The doorway has a fanlight, and the doorway and ground floor windows have lintels with keystones. The window above the doorway has a round head and a hood mould, and over the entry and at the rear are knitters' windows.	II
Gates and gate piers, St Helen's Church; 52.93124°N 1.27399°W		1855	The gates and gate piers were designed by John Shaw Jr., and moved here from Wellington College, Berkshire in 1922. They are in wrought and cast iron, and there are also stone piers. The gates have scrolled tops and latticed iron piers, and are linked by scrolled railings to panelled stone piers. To the left is a spearhead wicket gate.	II
Cemetery Chapel and Mortuary; 52.92998°N 1.26938°W		1880–82	This consists of a central archway flanked by chapels and mortuaries, in brick and stone with slate roofs. The arch is segmental and flanked by buttresses. Above it is an inscribed frieze, pinnacles, and an octagonal spire, the bell stage with double-lancet openings and moulded eaves with gargoyles, and the spire has four gabled lucarnes, a finial and a cross. The chapels each have a central buttress, and two lancet windows, above which is a spherical triangle window with a hood mould, and a small triple lancet.	II
