= Dai Morgan Evans =

British archaeologist (1944–2017)

Dai Morgan Evans (1 March 1944 – 1 March 2017) was a British archaeologist and academic. He is best known for his television appearances in programmes such as Rome Wasn't Built in a Day.

Morgan Evans was born in West Kirby and grew up in Chester. Morgan Evans studied archaeology at Cardiff University from 1963 to 1966, and subsequently worked for the Inspectorate of Ancient Monuments and Historic Buildings. He directed numerous excavations, worked for English Heritage from 1977 to 1992, and then became General Secretary of the Society of Antiquaries of London, retiring from the post in 2004. He was Chairman of the Butser Ancient Farm Trust, and a visiting professor at the University of Chester.

In 2002 he participated in and later presented a Discovery Channel series on the reconstruction of a Roman villa.

The "villa urbana" erected at Wroxeter during the Channel 4 series Rome Wasn't Built in a Day was designed by Morgan Evans and is based on one of the villas excavated on the Wroxeter site. It opened to the public on 19 February 2011, and, by the end of the year, needed maintenance work to repair frost damage

He died on his 73rd birthday, 1 March 2017, after suffering from cancer.

== Works ==
- Rebuilding the Past: A Roman Villa (1993)
