= Wreocensæte =

Anglo-Saxon people of Mercia, England

- c. AD 656 – AD 8th century
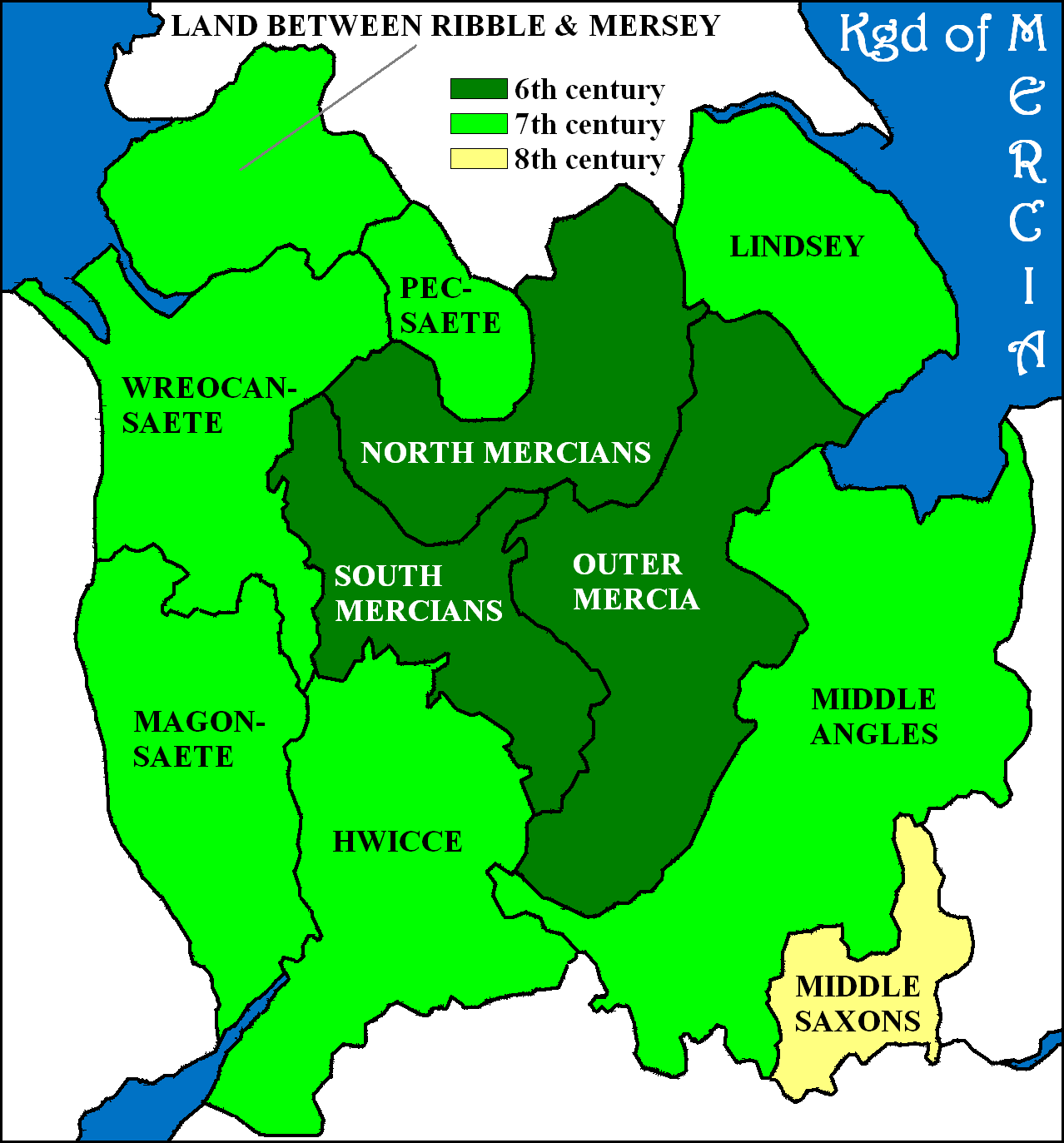
- Wreocensæte in Mercia
- Religion: Anglo-Saxon paganism, Anglo-Saxon Christianity
- Historical era: Anglo-Saxon
  - Establishment: c. AD 656
  - Conquest by Mercia: c. AD 8th century
Succeeded by
Mercia; Danelaw
- Today part of: United Kingdom

The Wreocensæte (Old English: Wrēocensǣte, Wrōcensǣte, Wrōcesǣte, Wōcensǣte), sometimes anglicized as the Wrekinsets, were one of the peoples of Anglo-Saxon Britain. Their name approximates to "Wrekin-dwellers". It is also suggested that Wrexham also derived from Wreocensæte.

The literal meaning of Wrocensaete is 'those dwelling at Wrocen'. N.J. Higham interprets this as referring to Wroxeter, the former civitas of the Cornovii, which became the centre of government of this early sub-Roman kingdom which was the successor territorial unit to Cornovia. He states that, 'It may refer quite specifically to the royal court itself, in the first instance, and only by extension to the territory administered from the court.' The hillfort on the Wrekin has to date produced no archaeological evidence of Roman, sub-Roman or Anglo-Saxon settlement. The name Wrocensaete was long in use, first occurring in the Tribal Hidage (a tribute list which is normally dated to the seventh century) and was last documented as Wreocensetun, a province or district of Mercia in which the Vikings were reported to be active in 855.

The boundaries of the kingdom are uncertain, but it was substantial as the Tribal Hidage lists it as 7000 hides, equal to the kingdoms of the East Saxons and South Saxons. The evidence suggests that the Wrekinset were the most northerly of the three large Mercian subject kingdoms facing Wales, with the Magonsæte to their south, and the Hwicce farthest south.

The chief place was seemingly the former Roman Viroconium Cornoviorum (modern Wroxeter), the former civitas of the Cornovii and close to the hill fort known as The Wrekin. The kingdom may have covered much of modern Cheshire, Shropshire and into North East Wales, Wrexham, Denbighshire and Flintshire. The border between Wales and Wreocensæte would have been Offa's Dyke.

As with the neighbouring Magonsæte, the lands of the Wreocensæte appear to have included a number of lesser tribes or kingdoms. Place-names suggest that the much smaller Meresæte and Rhiwsæte lay within the lands of the Wreocensæte. These, and the more southerly examples in Magonsæte, appear to be spaced regularly along the line of the frontier with Wales, and it is suggested that they may be artificial in origin, created by a king of Mercia to delineate and defend that border.
