= St Luke's Church, Stapleford =

Coordinates: 52°56′26″N 01°16′39″W

St. Luke's Church, Stapleford
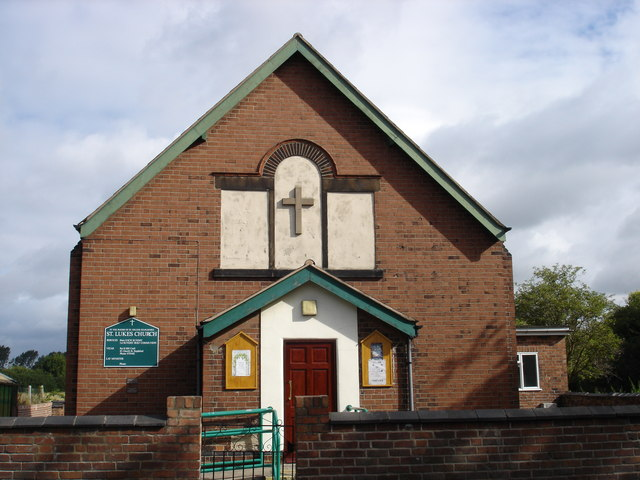
- Front elevation
- St. Luke's Church, Stapleford
- Denomination: Church of England
- Churchmanship: Evangelical
- Website: www.staplefordparish.org.uk

History
- Dedication: St. Luke

Administration
- Province: York
- Diocese: Southwell and Nottingham
- Parish: Stapleford, Nottinghamshire

St. Luke's Church Stapleford is a parish church in the Church of England in Stapleford, Nottinghamshire.

== History ==
The church is a mission church. It is on Moorbridge Lane.

== Current parish status ==
St. Luke's Church, Stapleford is looked after by its mother church, St. Helen's Church, Stapleford
