= Rome Wasn't Built in a Day (TV series) =

2011 British reality show

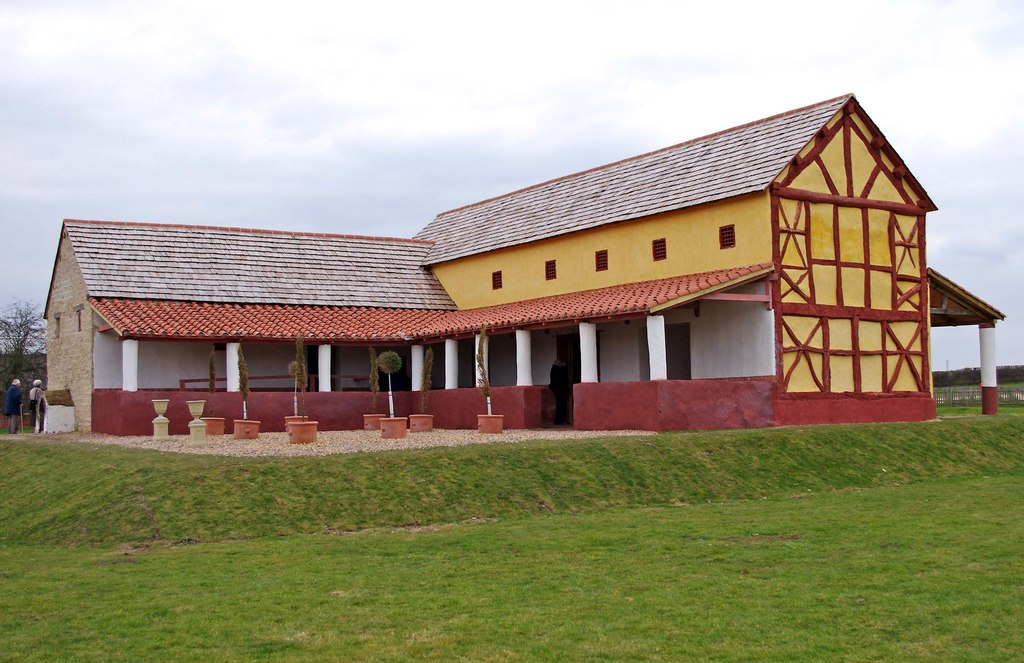
The replica Villa Urbana

Rome Wasn't Built in a Day is a television series first shown on Channel 4 in the UK in 2011.

The series, narrated by Stephen Mangan, shows the day-to-day activities and tribulations of a team of present-day builders employed to construct a Roman villa at Wroxeter (Viroconium Cornoviorum) using authentic ancient techniques. The team consisted of foreman Jim Blackham, plasterer Timothy Dalton-Dobson, plumber Kevin Fail, carpenter Fred Farray, bricklayer Darren Prince and labourer Ben Gotsell. They were assisted by a team of local volunteers and occasionally by skilled craftsmen, and supervised by archaeologist Professor Dai Morgan Evans, who designed the villa on behalf of English Heritage.

The series began on 20 January 2011. Carpenter Fred Farray was sacked in episode three, after serious problems in the construction of the first roof truss, and was replaced by carpenter William Kendall in episode five. The timber frame was completed by local craftmen Dylan Hartley and Bob Ockenden.

The completed villa was opened to the public on 19 February 2011. It was designed to give visitors an insight into Roman building techniques and how the Romans lived. However, by the end of the year, it was reported that it needed maintenance work to repair frost damage It is now referred to by English Heritage as a "town house" rather than a "villa".

== International broadcast ==
- In Australia, this programme commenced airing on ABC1 each Tuesday at 8:30pm from 4 October 2011.
- In New Zealand, this programme commenced airing on Living each Sunday at 6:30pm from 13 November 2011.
