= Old Oswestry =

Iron Age hillfort in Shropshire, England

Old Oswestry Hill Fort
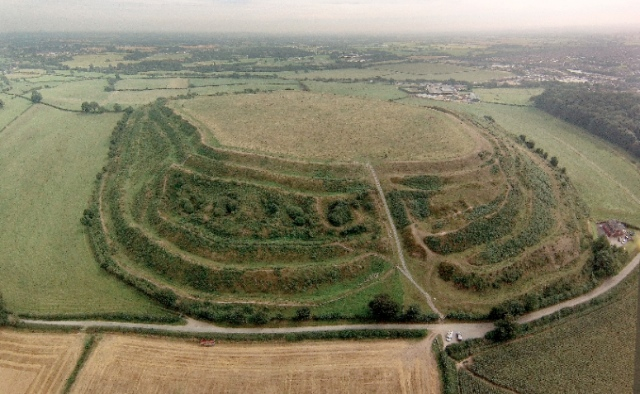
- An easterly view of the western entrance to Old Oswestry hill fort

- Location of Old Oswestry Hill Fort within Shropshire
- 52.87273°N 3.04886°W
- Type: Hillfort
- Periods: Iron Age; Roman Britain
- Cultures: Celtic people of Iron Age Britain
- Associated with: Cornovii or Ordovices
- Location: Oswestry, Shropshire
- Region: West Midlands
- OS grid reference: SJ 2957 3103

History
- Built: 8th century BCE
- Abandoned: Roman conquest of Britain

Site notes
- Material: earth and wood
- Elevation: 165 m (541 ft)
- Height: 27 m (89 ft)
- Area: 25 ha (62 acres)
- Diameter: 500 m (550 yd)
- Circumference: 1,600 yd (1,500 m)
- Excavation dates: 1939
- Archaeologists: William J Varley
- Management: English Heritage
- Public access: free

Old Oswestry (Welsh: Hen Ddinas) is a large early Iron Age hill fort in the Welsh Marches near Oswestry in north west Shropshire, England. The earthworks, which remain one of the best preserved hill forts in the UK, have been described as "The Stonehenge of the Iron Age Period". After the hill fort was abandoned, it was incorporated into Wat's Dyke by the Mercians during the Early Medieval period.

The hill fort was designated as a scheduled monument in 1934. The site is now managed by English Heritage. The accessible hill fort, at 160 metres (520 ft) ordnance datum, gives panoramic views across North and Mid Wales, Cheshire and Shropshire.

== History ==
The earliest occupation of the site began in the 8th century BC and continued up until the Roman conquest of Britain. Its inhabitants were either from the tribes of the Cornovii or Ordovices.

The complexity of defences suggests there have been several phases of development. In the earliest period, a few round huts were sited on the undefended hillock. Subsequently these were enclosed by a double bank and ditch that enclosed 5.3 ha (13 acres). Entrances were placed at the east and west ends of the earthworks where the inner bank was pulled inwards to create large gateways. Later a third bank was added on all sides except the south east where the hill's steep incline made it unnecessary.

The western entrance was re-modeled with unusual rectangular hollows separated by ridges dug out and defended by outworks. The eastern entrance was also strengthened with two further external circuits of banks and ditches. Despite the size of its fortifications, there is no evidence that the Roman Legions attacked Old Oswestry during their conquest of the region in the 50 CEs.

In the Early Medieval period, it became associated as the birthplace of the ancient Brythonic queen Guinevere of Arthurian legend.

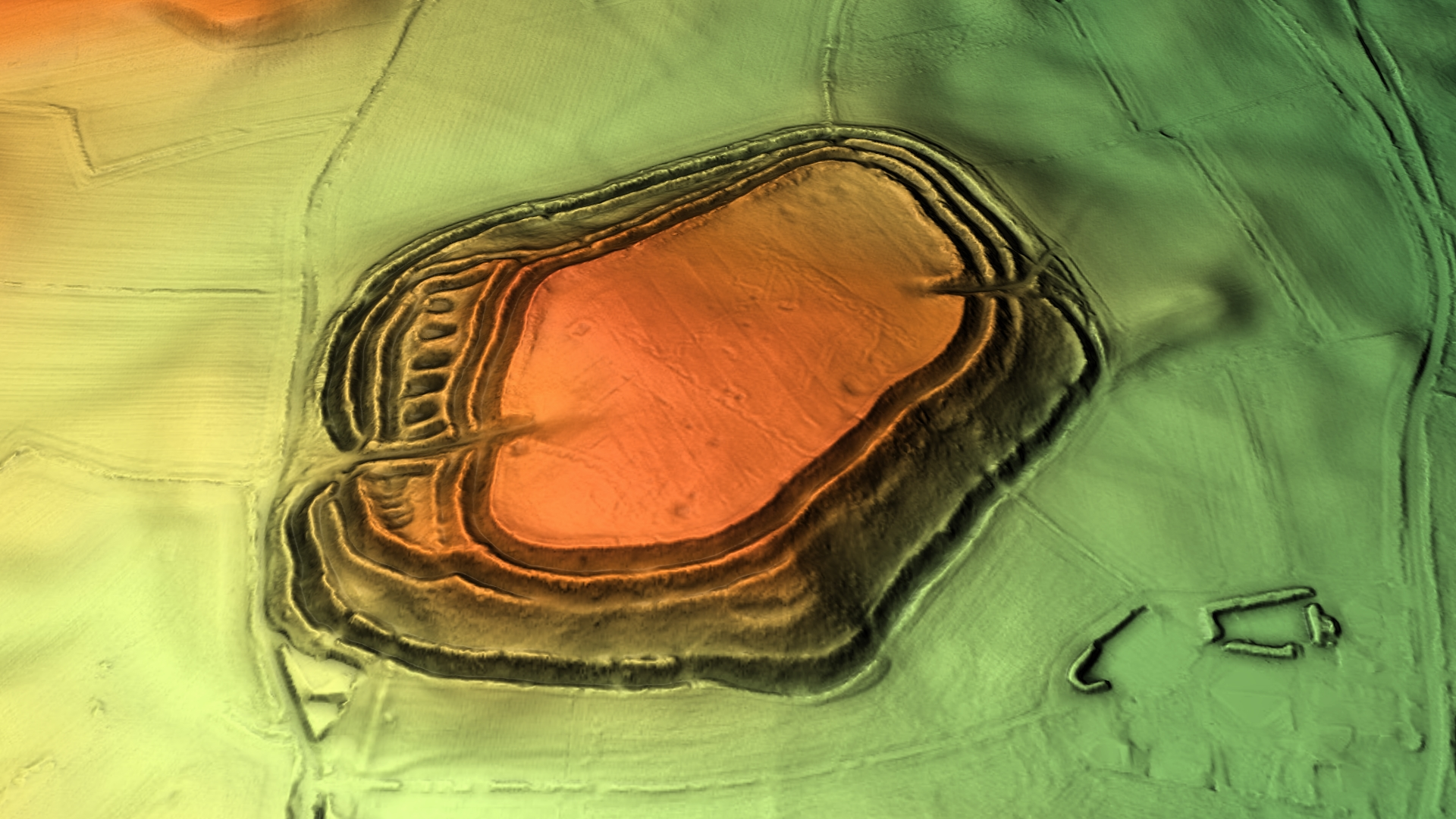
3D view of the digital terrain model

During the First World War, units of the Canadian Expeditionary Force stationed at nearby Park Hall camp used the earthworks for training purposes. Many large pits, trenches and craters from explosives irreparably damaged the interior site during these military activities. The war poet Wilfred Owen, who was born in Oswestry, completed his trench warfare training at the hill fort when he was stationed at Park Hall.

== Preservation ==
In 1934, Old Oswestry was listed as a scheduled monument, along with two adjacent sections of Wat's Dyke.

In 1939–40, geologist and amateur archaeologist William J. Varley conducted the most extensive examination of the site. His work, which was not published until the 1990s, remains the most authoritative work on the site. His excavations showed that the complex defensive ramparts that surround the hill fort were not built at the same time and that there were four distinct phases in their development.

The hill fort is managed by English Heritage. Access is free.

Since 2015, housing developers have been trying to get planning permission for new homes near the slopes of the ancient monument. However, an ongoing campaign (backed by local residents and archaeologists) has stalled these proposals.

In 2024 a 3D model was produced to inform vegetation management.
