= St Helen's Church, Stapleford =

Church in Stapleford, Nottinghamshire, England

Coordinates: 52°55′54″N 01°16′28″W

St. Helen's Church, Stapleford
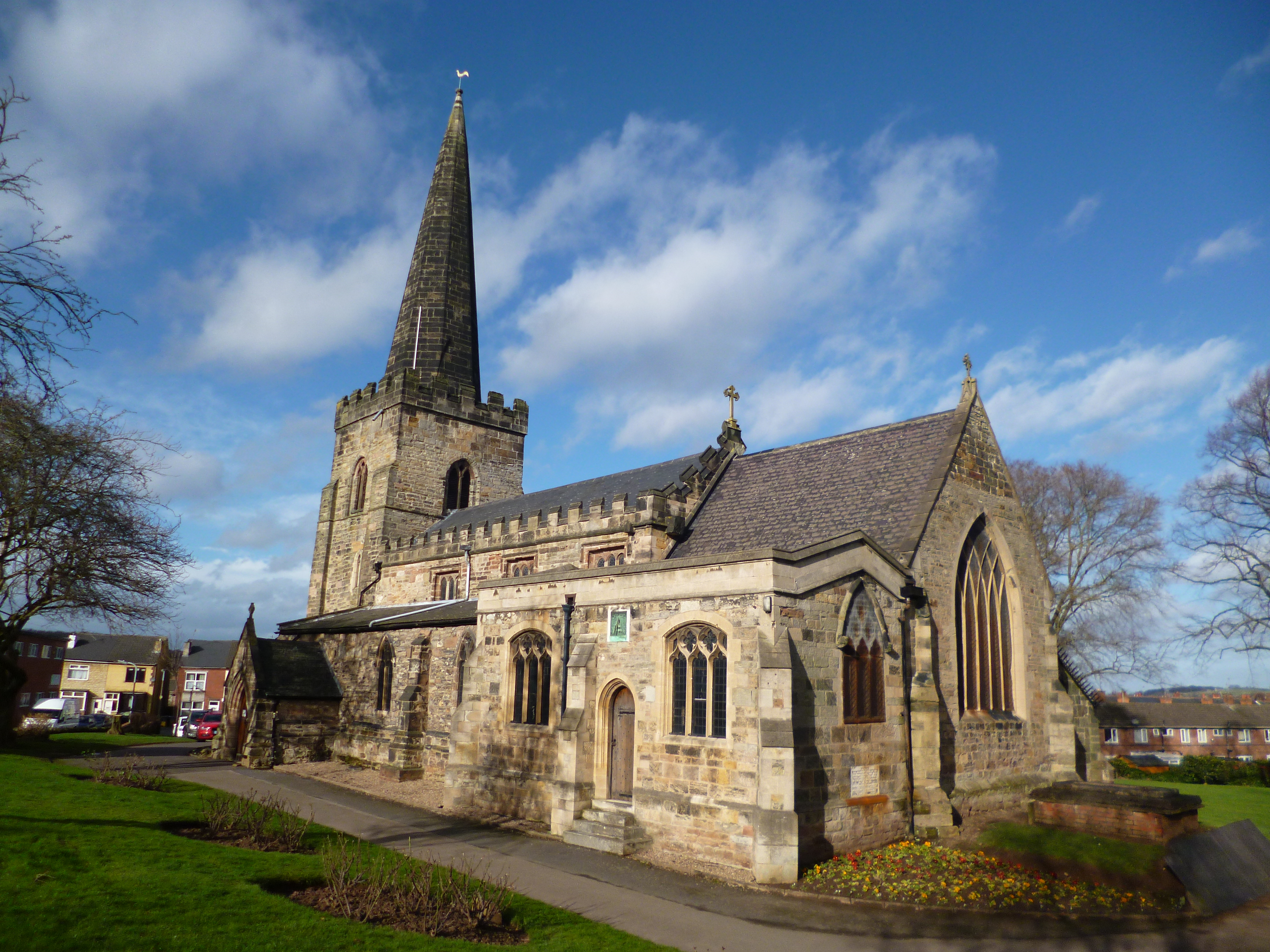
- St Helen's Church, Stapleford
- St. Helen's Church, Stapleford
- Denomination: Church of England
- Churchmanship: Evangelical
- Website: www.staplefordparish.org.uk

History
- Dedication: St. Helen

Administration
- Province: York
- Diocese: Southwell and Nottingham
- Parish: Stapleford, Nottinghamshire

St. Helen's Church Stapleford is a parish church in the Church of England in Stapleford, Nottinghamshire.

The church is Grade II* listed by the Department for Digital, Culture, Media and Sport as it is a particularly significant building of more than local interest.

Stapleford cross in the churchyard is listed Grade I, and is also a scheduled ancient monument.

== History ==
The church is medieval. A clerestory was built with four perpendicular windows towards the end of the fifteenth century. In 1785 a classical porch and doorway was added. A gallery was erected across the west end. The walls were plastered and the roof covered by a flat ceiling. Some repairs were carried out in 1819. in 1875-77 a major restoration was undertaken. The brick buttresses on the north side were removed and the walls were underpinned. A new aisle, organ, chamber and vestry were erected. The roofs were replaced completed and the gallery taken down. The windows were renovated and the east window was fitted with stained glass by the Munich Company. A rood screen and chancel stalls of oak were inserted. The restoration cost £1,500 (equivalent to £151,200 in 2025) and the architect was W.H. Parkinson of Leeds.

In 1923 the memorial chapel was added. It was designed by Sir Thomas Graham Jackson.

== Organ ==
A new organ by Charles Lloyd and Co of Nottingham was installed in 1877. It contained 2 manuals and pedals and had 11 speaking stops and the great manual had 3 spare slides. The organ was restored in 1958 at a cost of £250.

== Bells ==
The church tower contains 6 bells. The treble, 2 and 3 were cast by John Taylor & Co in 1932. The 4th dates from 1843 by Samuel Midworth. The 5th and tenor are by the Leicester foundry and date from ca. 1499. The tenor weight is 371 kilograms (818 lb).

== Stone Cross ==
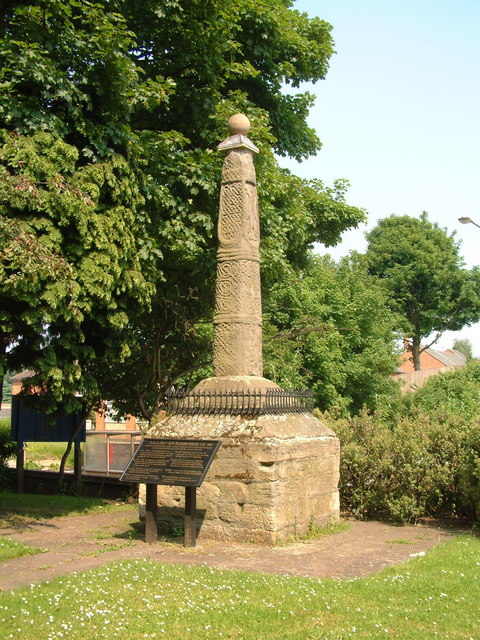
Stapleford Cross

The churchyard contains a grade-I listed stone cross which dates from around AD1000. It was said by Pevsner to be "by far the most important pre-Conquest monument in Notts."

The cross may be the origin of the name 'Stapleford' which means a crossing near a post.

== Memorials ==
- Robert Tevery, died 1571
- Gervase Tevery, died 1639
- George John Borlase Warren, died 1801

== Current parish status ==
St. Helen's Church Stapleford has a daughter church, St. Luke's Church Stapleford and also a church plant called Church @ Montrose Court.

== See also ==
- Grade II* listed buildings in Nottinghamshire
- Listed buildings in Stapleford, Nottinghamshire
