= Rutunium =

Roman settlement in modern-day Shropshire, England

Coordinates: 52.822°N 2.655°W

Rutunium was a former Roman settlement at the site of Harcourt Park, Shropshire, in the United Kingdom. It appeared in the Antonine Itinerary.
