= Roman Middlewich =

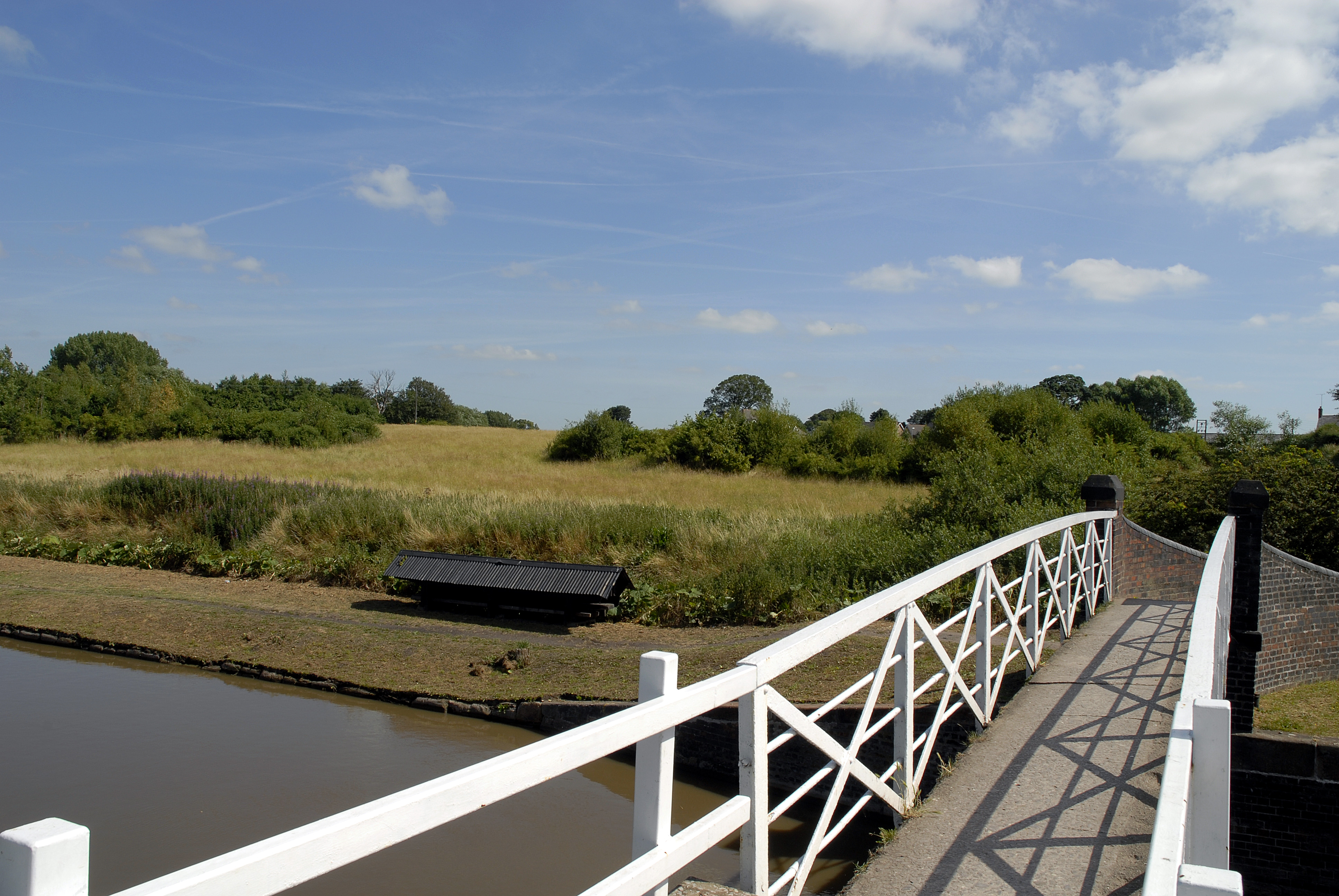
Harbutt's (or Harvest) Field, site of the Roman fort.

Middlewich was founded by the Romans as Salinae on account of the salt deposits around it, as it was one of their major sites of salt production. Middlewich lies across the King Street fault, which follows King Street and then continues roughly following Brooks Lane. Salinae is taken to be the Roman name for "the salt workings" and it also appears to be the name given to Droitwich. During this time the Romans built a fort at Harbutts Field (SJ70216696), to the north of the town, and recent excavations to the south of the fort have found evidence of further Roman activity including a well and part of a preserved Roman road. A further excavation in 2004 in Buckley's Field has found further evidence of Roman occupation. A Roman Road, King Street runs between Middlewich and nearby Northwich. It has been postulated that this was the initial route of the Roman conquest of the North West of England, but evidence from pottery (in particular a scarcity of early Flavian samian ware suggests that this is unlikely. Middlewich was a junction between seven major Roman roads, and it has been known as 'Medius Vicus' (the town at the junction of the roads) in the past.

== Roman items in Middlewich Library ==
A number of Roman artefacts can be found in Middlewich library, including the following

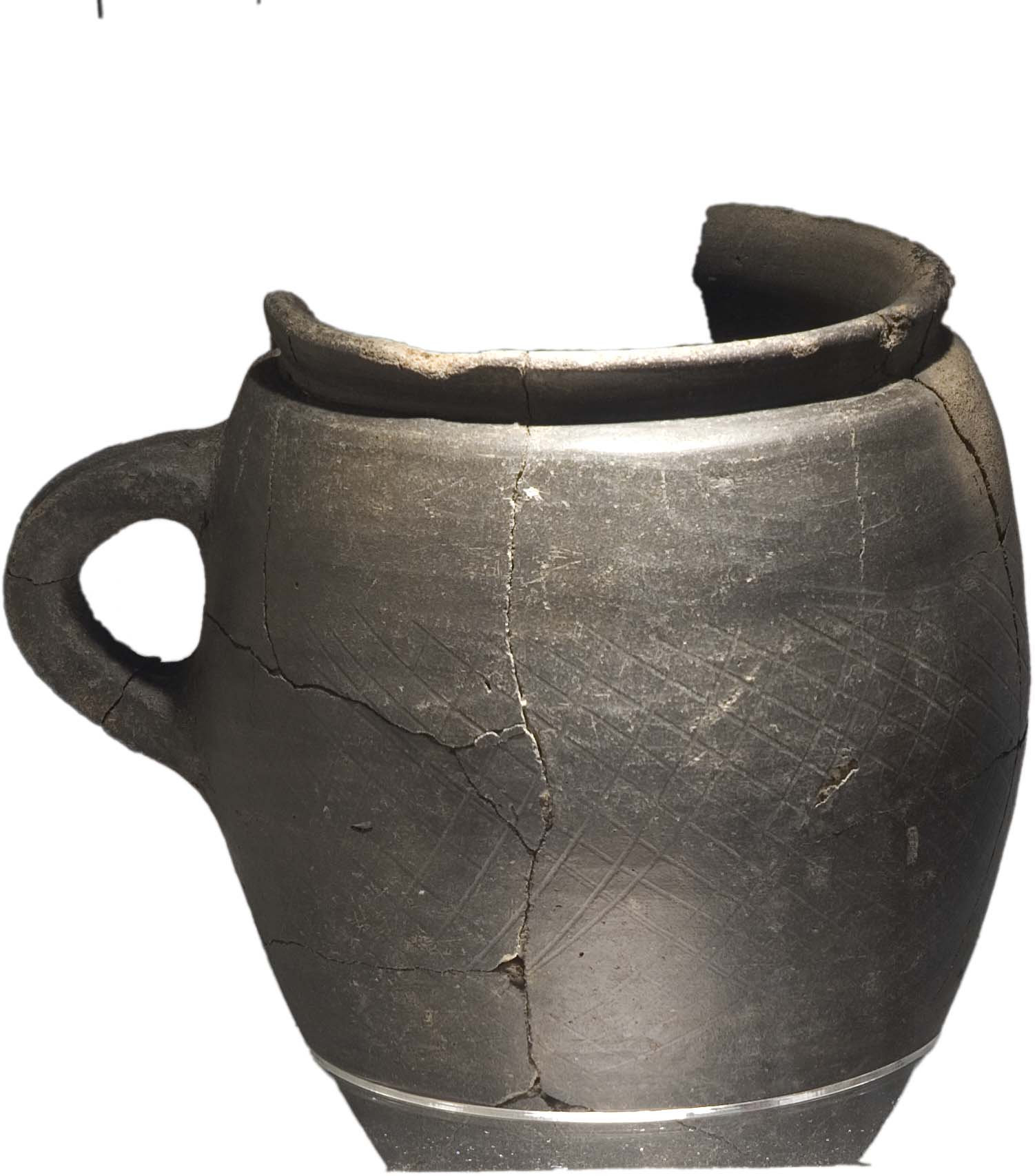
Tankard Black burnished-ware tankard, thought to have been made in either Dorset, the Thames estuary or Kent between 120-200AD. It has been polished with small stones to give it a grey-black metallic sheen.

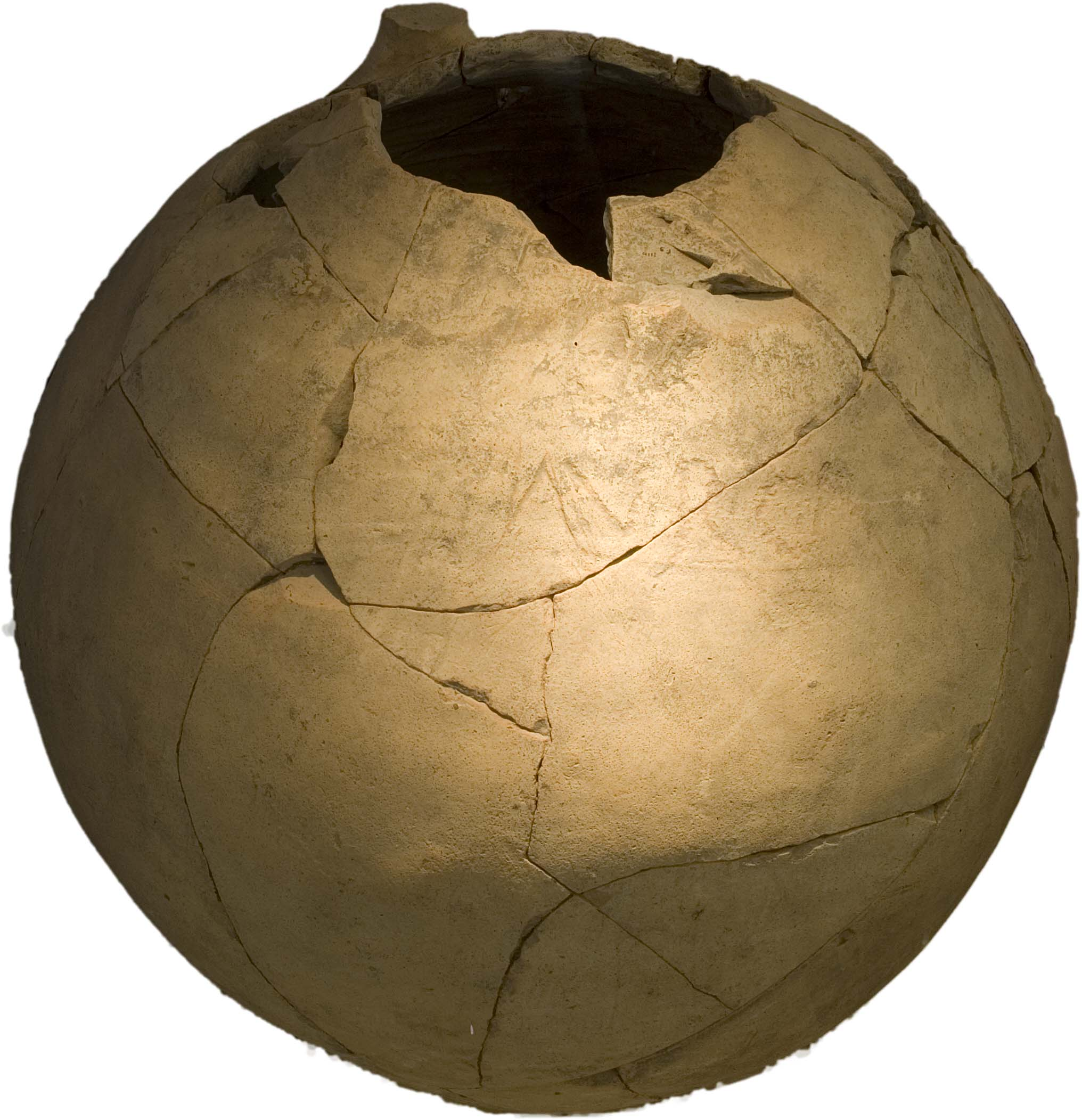
Amphora, of a type used to transport olive oil, wine or fish sauce throughout the empire. This was later used for salt making, as shown by the letters AMVRCO, meaning "Salt waste", scratched into the surface.

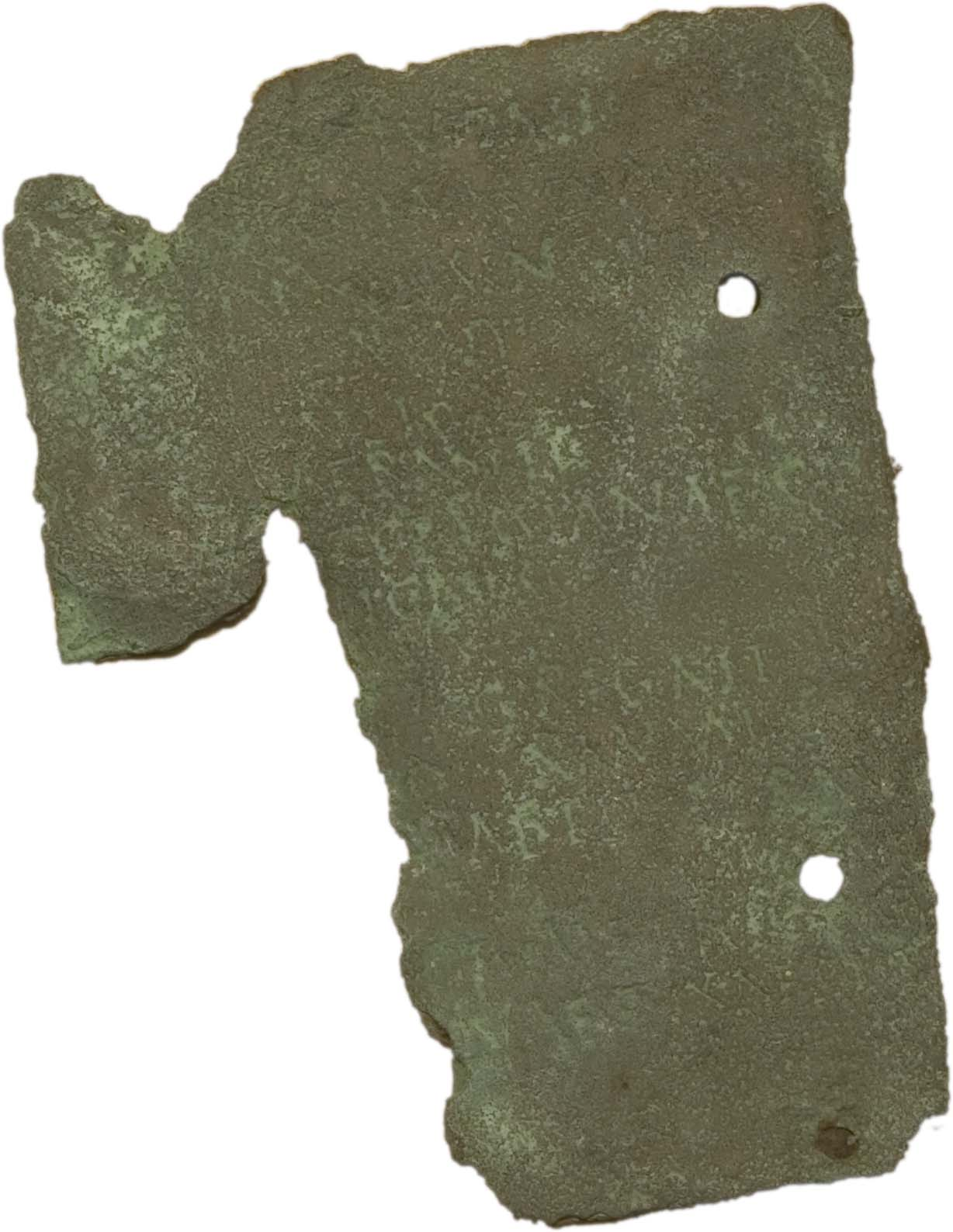
A military discharge diploma. This military discharge diploma granted to a trooper of the Ala Classiana cavalry regiment in 105 AD. The original was found off King Street, Middlewich

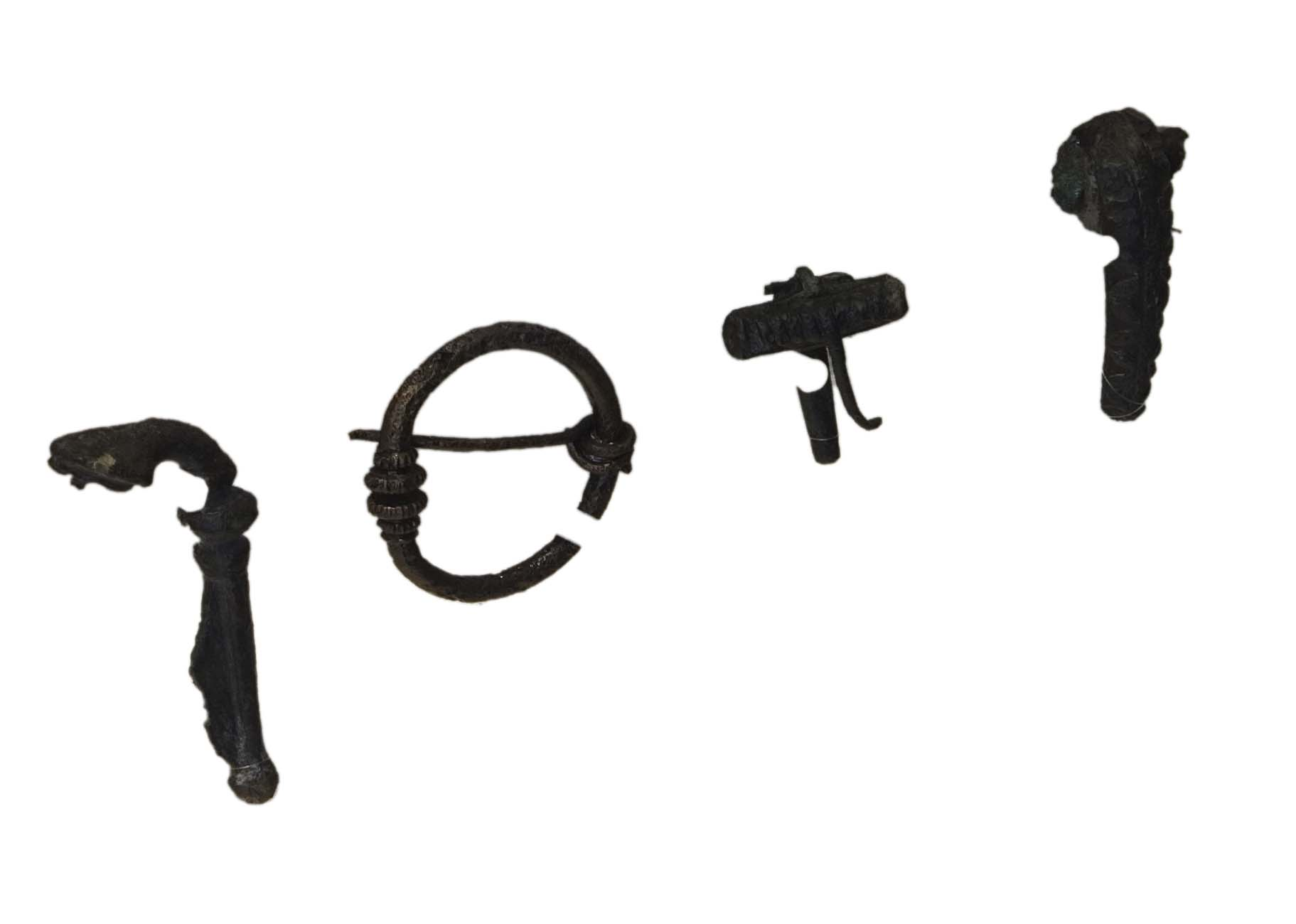
Brooches, from left to right: Trumpet brooch (2nd to 4th century), Penannular brooch (2nd to 4th century) and two other bronze brooches (or fibulae).

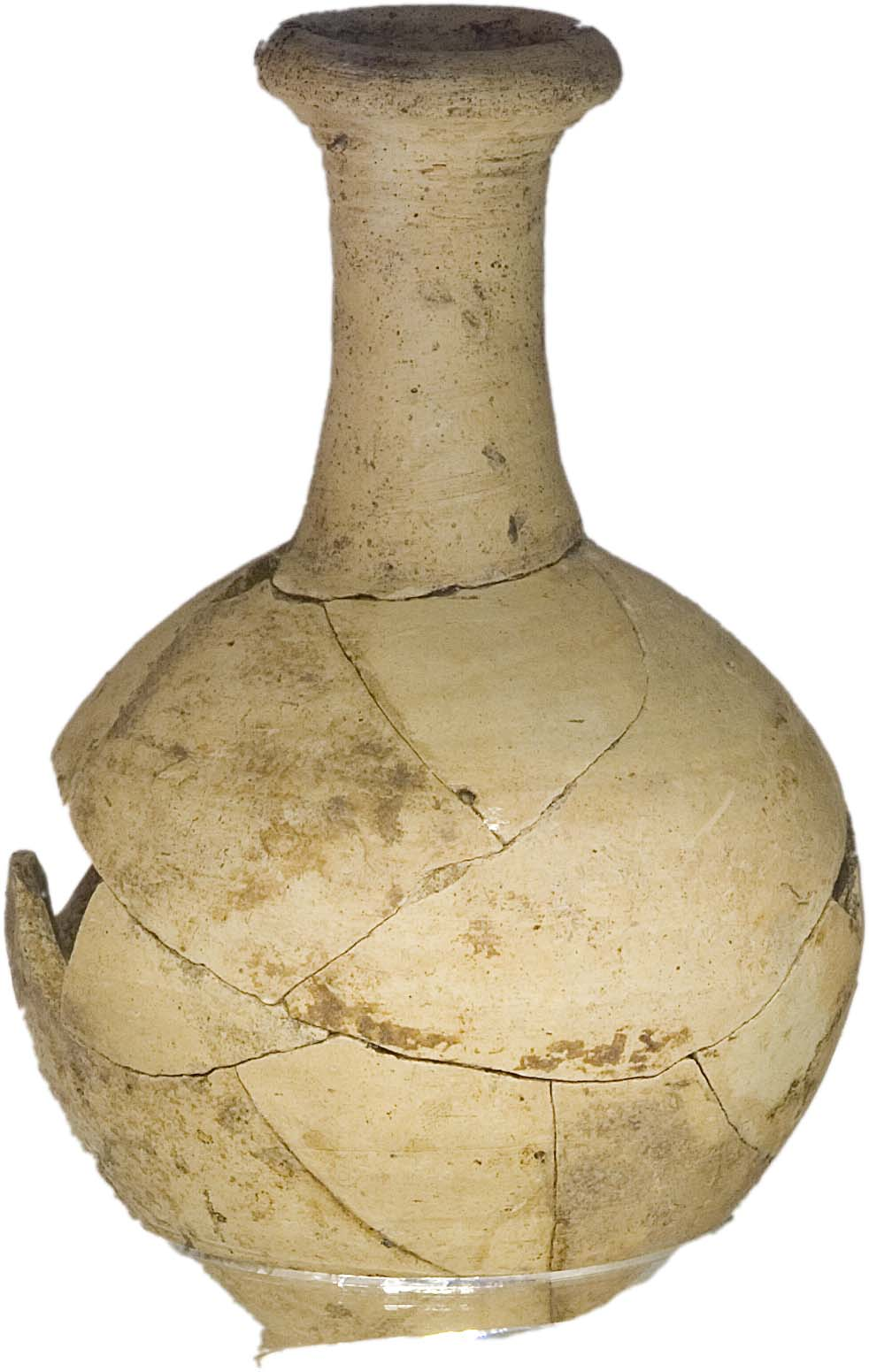
A 3rd century creamware flagon probably used to hold wine.

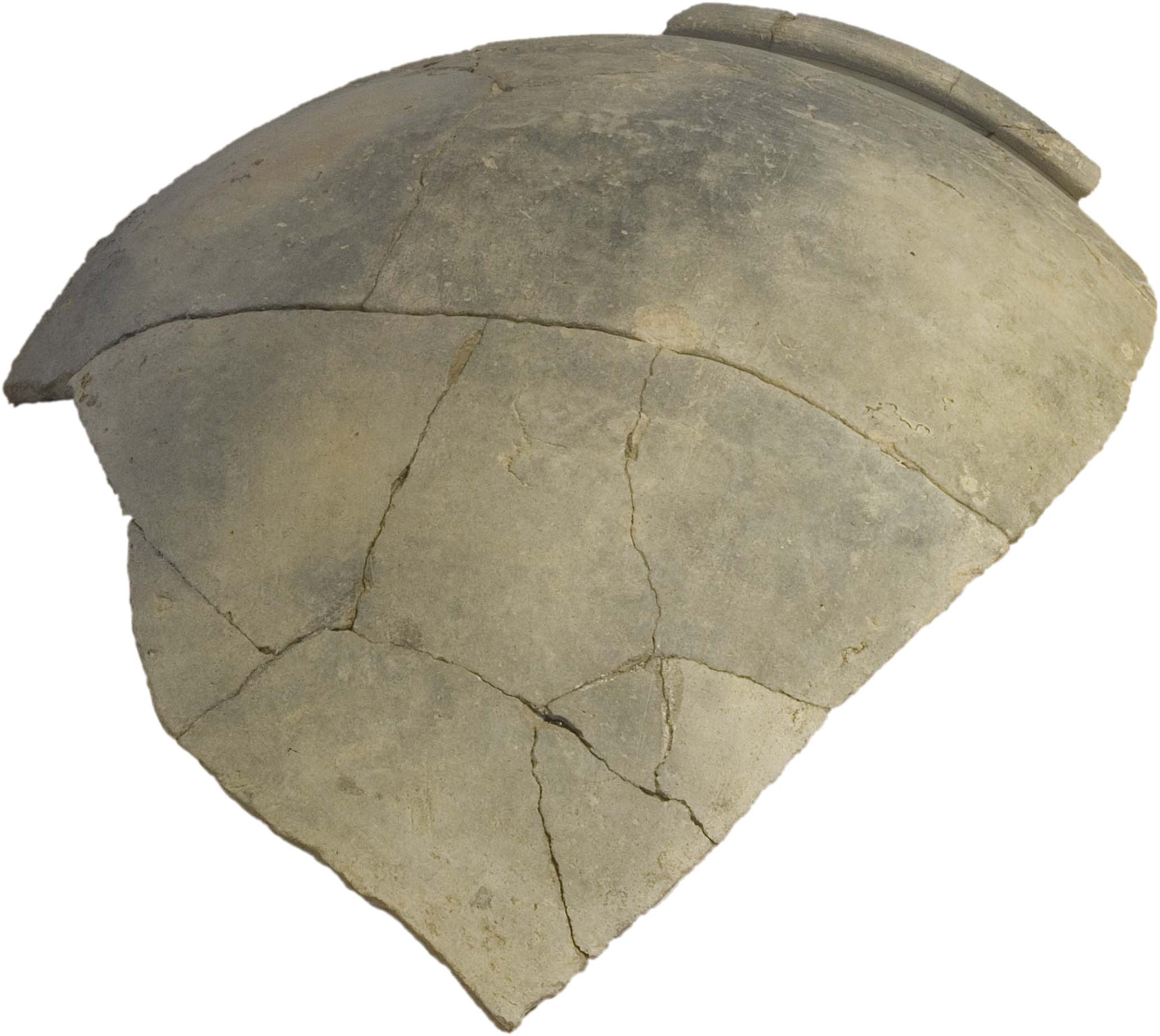
A fragment of a Roman army stewpot

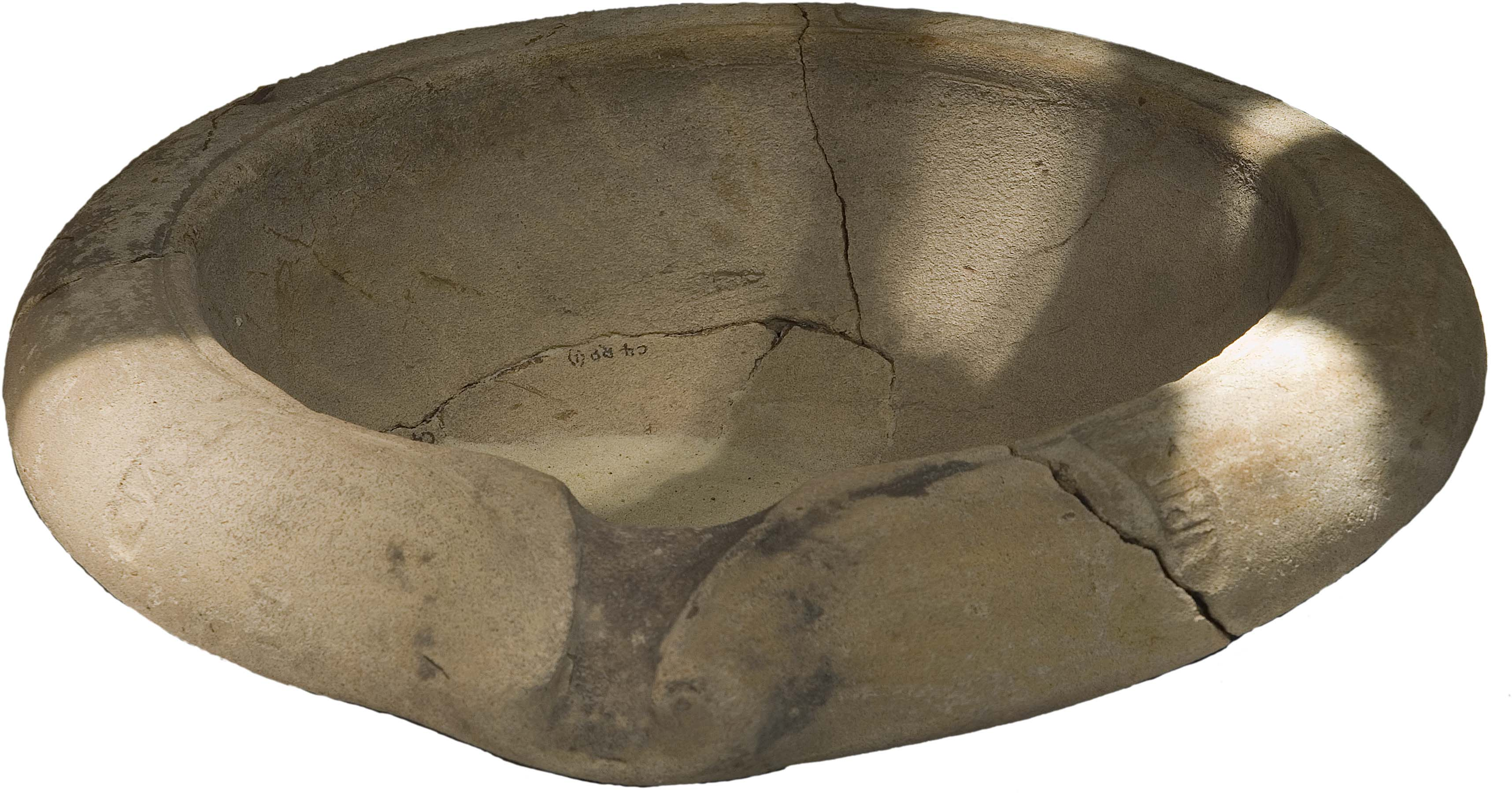
A mortarium or mixing bowl, from 80 to 110 AD, marked ALBINVS (the potters name) on the rim, probably made at Wilderspool.

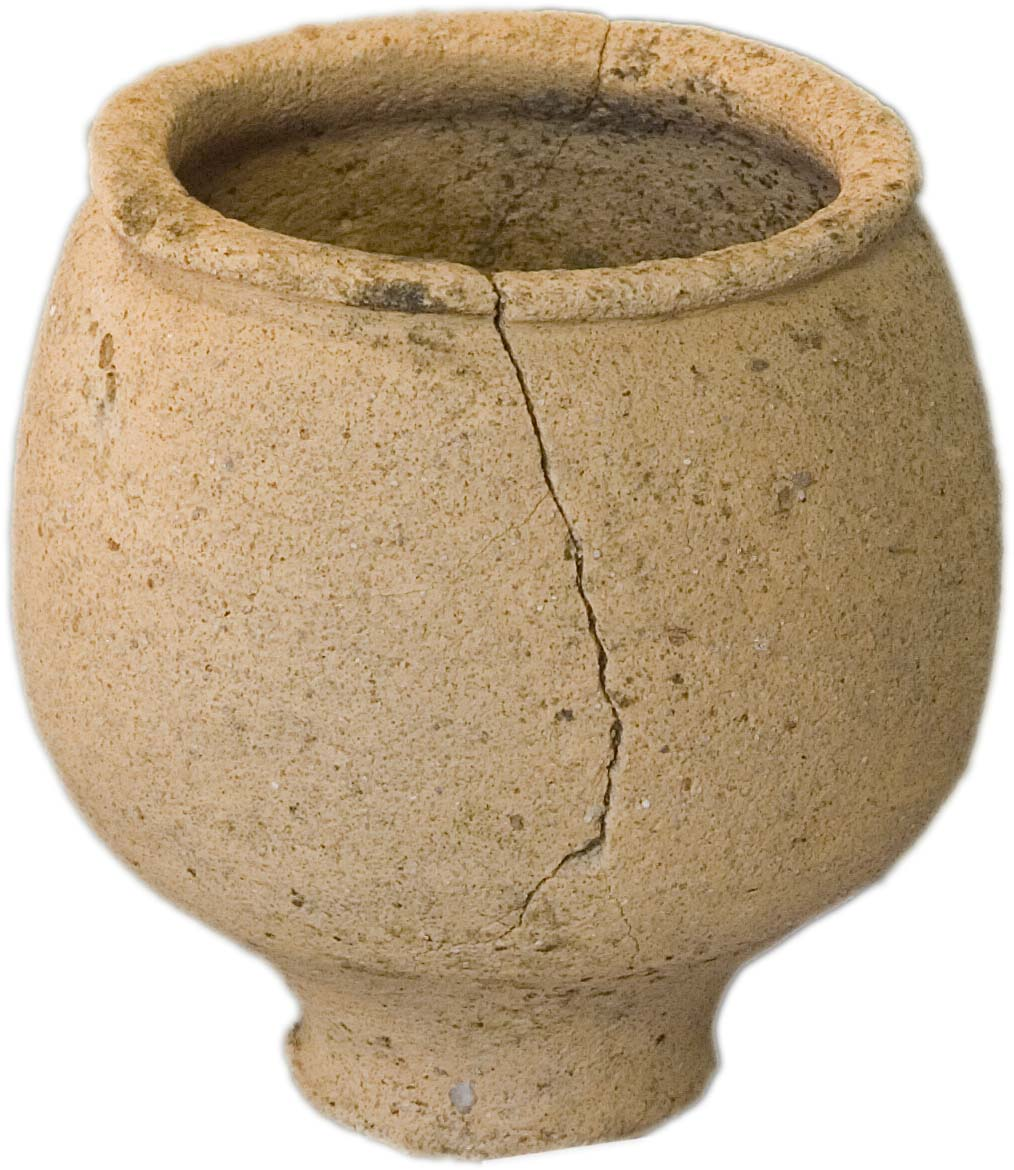
Orange ware beaker

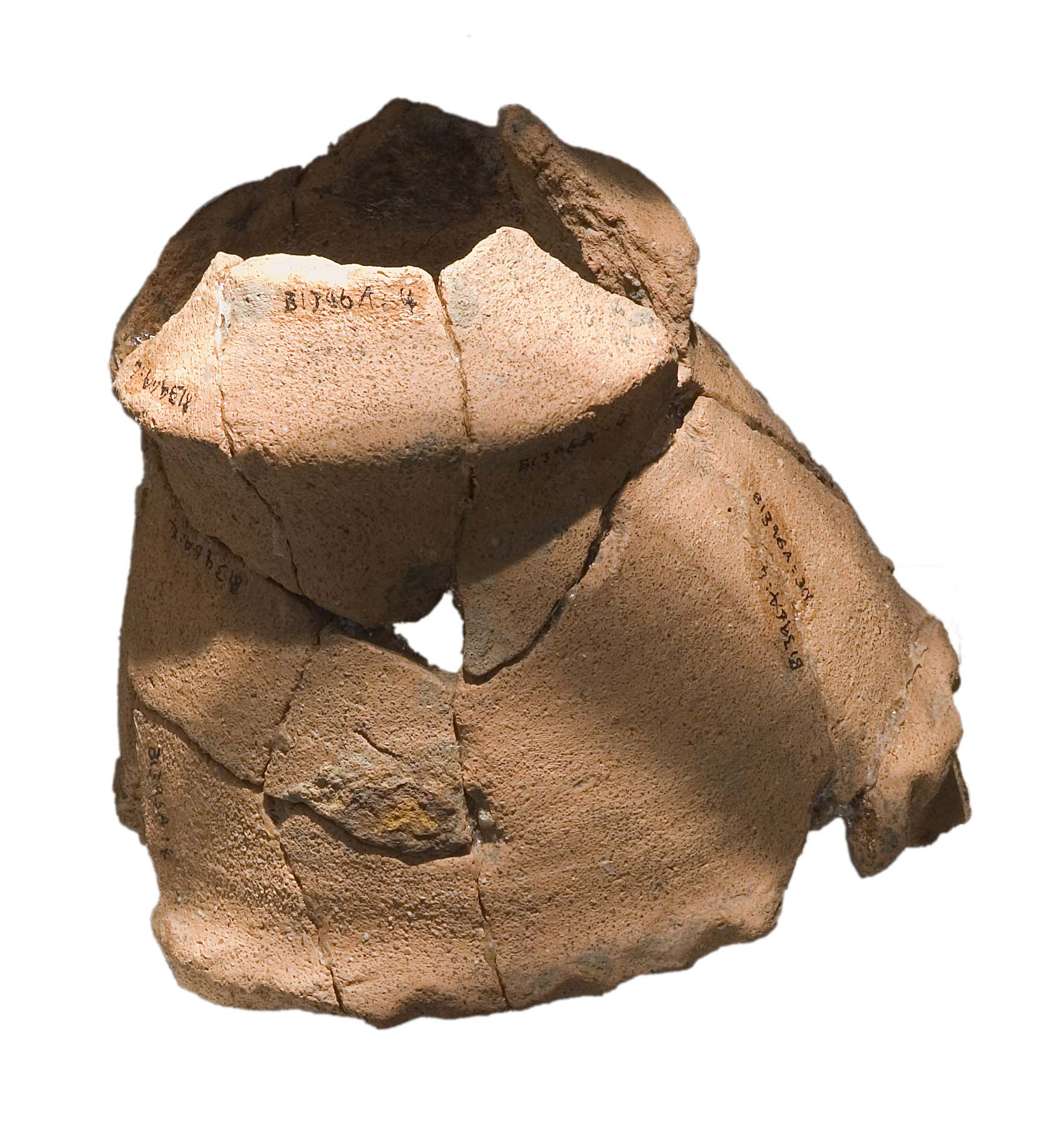
Chimney pot

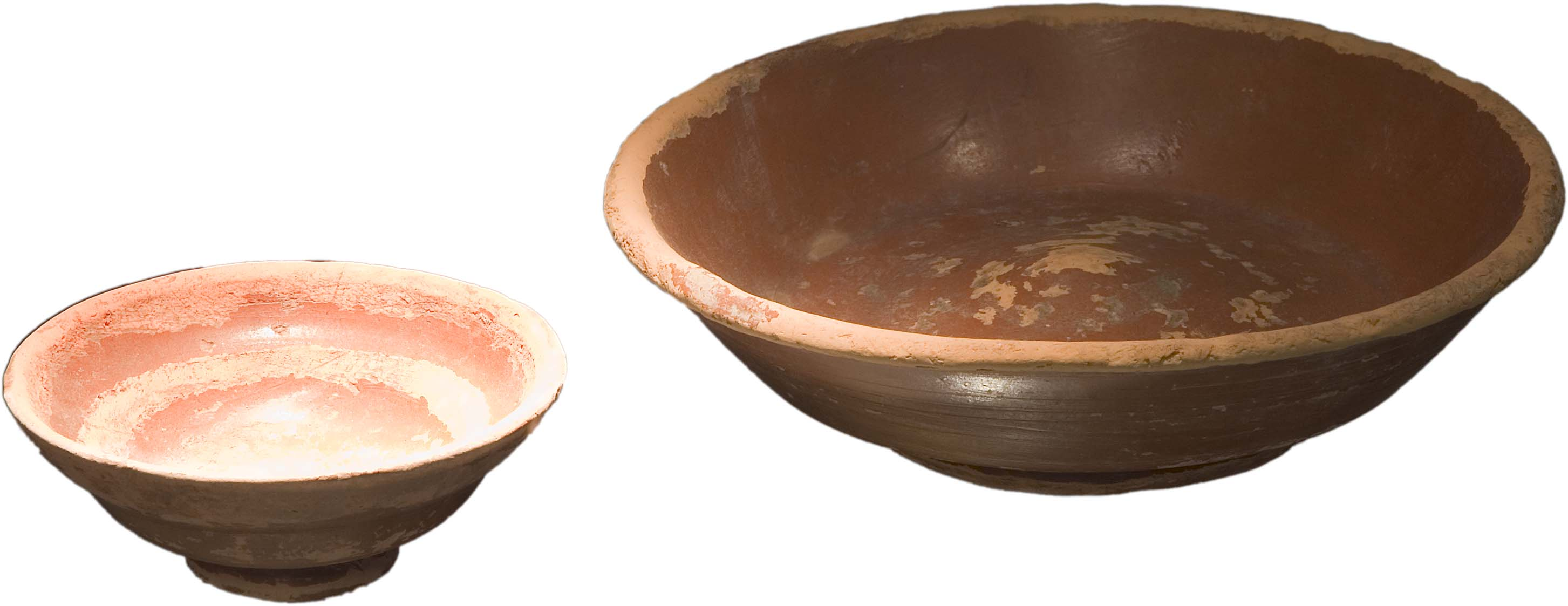
Terra sigillata, or "fine" pottery

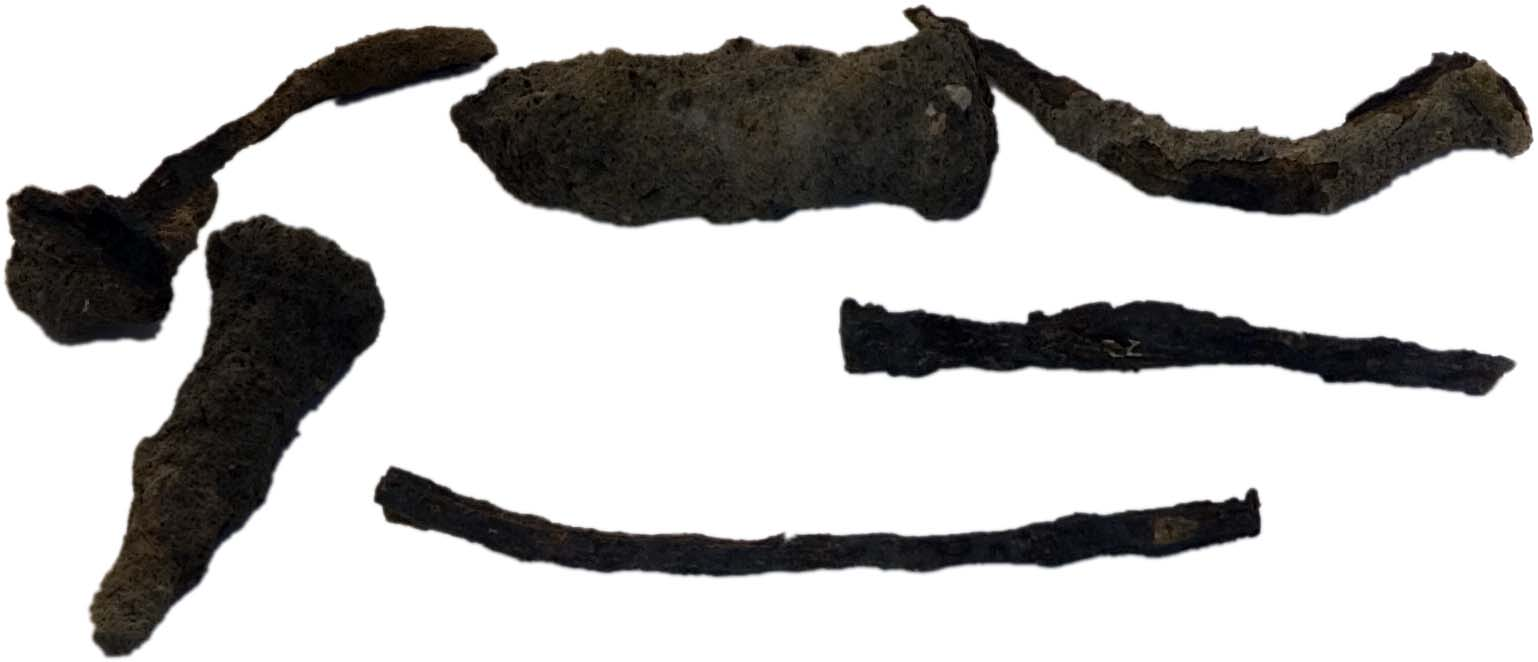
Iron nails from the 2nd century AD.
