= Eton College controversies =

There have been many controversies concerning Eton College, sometimes called the most famous school in the world. In 2005, The Guardian claimed that "Eton is no stranger to scandalous allegations, nor to claims that it tries to prevent them leaking out."

== Tallulah Bankhead (1928) ==
Tallulah Bankhead, an American actress, made her debut on the London stage at Wyndham's Theatre in 1923 and soon became well known, appearing in many plays in London and across Great Britain's theatres throughout the Roaring Twenties. In the 1920s, the Home Office and MI5 were instructed to look into rumours that she was seducing boys at Eton. The headmaster, Cyril Alington, was unwilling to share what he knew and was anxious to keep the story out of the newspapers. One of the investigators noted on his file: "The headmaster is obviously not prepared to assist the Home Office by revealing what he knows of her exploits with some of the boys. He wants to do everything possible to keep Eton out of the scandal".

== Lottery grant (1995) ==
In 1995, the National Lottery granted £3 million towards a new sports complex, estimated to cost £4.6m, to add to Eton's existing facilities of two swimming pools, thirty cricket pitches, twenty-four football and hockey pitches, tennis courts, a gymnasium, and so on. The school was to pay £200,000 and contribute 4.5 hectares of land, in return for exclusive use of the facilities during the daytime only, and there would be community use at other times. The Sports Council defended the deal, on the grounds that the whole community would benefit, while the Eton College bursar stated that the Windsor, Slough and Eton Athletic Club was deprived and local people who were not pupils at the College did not have a world-class running track and facilities for training. Steve Osborn, director of the Safe Neighbourhoods Unit, described the decision as "staggering", given the background of a substantial reduction in youth services by councils across the country, a matter over which, however, neither Eton nor the Sports Council had any control. The facility, which became the Thames Valley Athletics Centre, opened in April 1999.

== Unfair dismissal of an art teacher / Prince Harry's A Level grades (2003–2005) ==
In October 2004, Sarah Forsyth claimed that she had been bullied by senior staff and had been unfairly dismissed by Eton College. She also claimed that she had been instructed to complete some of Prince Harry's coursework, to enable him to pass his A Level Art examination. As evidence, Forsyth provided secretly recorded conversations with both Prince Harry and her Head of Department, Ian Burke.

An employment tribunal in July 2005 found that she had been unfairly dismissed and criticised Burke for bullying her and for repeatedly changing his story. The tribunal also criticised the school for failing to produce its capability procedures. and criticised the Head Master, Tony Little, for not reviewing the case independently. However, it also criticised Forsyth's action in recording a conversation with Prince Harry as an abuse of teacher–student confidentiality and said "It is clear whichever version of the evidence is accepted that Mr Burke did ask the claimant to assist Prince Harry with text for his expressive art project... It is not part of this tribunal's function to determine whether or not it was legitimate." In response to the tribunal's ruling concerning the allegations about Prince Harry, the School issued a statement saying that Forsyth's claims "were dismissed for what they always have been—unfounded and irrelevant." A spokesperson from Clarence House said, "We are delighted that Harry has been totally cleared of cheating."

Sarah Forsyth asserted that Prince Harry was a "weak student" and that staff at Eton had conspired to help him cheat on examinations. Both Eton and Harry denied the claims. While the tribunal made no ruling on the cheating claim, it "accepted the prince had received help in preparing his A-level 'expressive' project, which he needed to pass to secure his place at Sandhurst."

Ms Forsyth told the tribunal that "I assumed I had been asked to do this because Prince Harry was a weak student." She said Harry's failings as a student were well known at Eton and she had been told that a teacher who marked Harry's entrance exam [to get into Eton] had been "desperate" to find points for which he could award marks.

In June 2003, Harry completed his education at Eton with two A-Levels, achieving a grade B in art and a grade D in geography. According to the BBC's September 2003 story entitled "Prince Harry: 'worst A-level grade at Eton' ", he "reportedly got the worst A-level grade of all the pupils at ... Eton. He got a D in his geography A-level, a grade no-one else in his year got."

== Child sexual abuse convictions (2004-2025) ==
Eton College has faced scrutiny over incidents in which members of its teaching staff were convicted of child sexual offences.

In 2004, Ian McAuslan, a former classics teacher, pleaded guilty to 14 counts of making and two counts of possessing indecent images of children. The offences came to light after he returned a computer to the school's IT department, which contained the illegal material. McAuslan was sentenced to nine months’ imprisonment, suspended for two years, and placed on the Sex Offenders Register for seven years.

In 2016 Andrew Picard, a student was found guilty of possessing and manufacturing child pornography. He was given a non-custodial sentence and was not made to register as a sex offender. He was also tried under a false name to protect his family.

In 2020, Matthew Mowbray, a former geography teacher and housemaster, was convicted of multiple sexual offences against pupils, including voyeurism, sexual activity with a child, and possession of indecent images. The court heard that he entered pupils’ bedrooms at night under the pretext of academic mentoring. He was sentenced to five years in prison.

In 2025, Jacob Leland, a former Russian teacher and assistant to a housemaster, was found guilty of three counts of sexual assault against a pupil. He was sentenced on 30 January 2026 to three years and three months' imprisonment.

== School fees cartel (2005) ==
In 2005, the Office of Fair Trading found fifty independent schools, including Eton, to have breached the Competition Act by "regularly and systematically" exchanging information about planned increases in school fees, which was collated and distributed among the schools by the bursar at Sevenoaks School. Following the investigation by the OFT, each school was required to pay around £70,000, totalling around £3.5 million, significantly less than the maximum possible fine. In addition, the schools together agreed to contribute another £3m to a new charitable educational fund. The Guardian questioned whether the charitable status of independent schools such as Eton should be reconsidered.

Jean Scott, the head of the Independent Schools Council, said the schools were following a long-established procedure in sharing the information with each other because independent schools were previously exempt from anti-cartel rules applied to business and that they were unaware of the change to the law, on which they had not been consulted. She wrote to John Vickers, the OFT director-general, saying, "They are not a group of businessmen meeting behind closed doors to fix the price of their products to the disadvantage of the consumer. They are schools that have quite openly continued to follow a long-established practice because they were unaware that the law had changed."

== Farming subsidies (2005) ==
A Freedom of Information request in 2005 revealed that in 2004 Eton had received £2,652 in farm subsidies, under the European Union's Common Agricultural Policy. Asked to explain what the subsidy was for, the school told The Guardian it was "a bit of a mystery". It then asked the Rural Payments Agency to explain the payment, but no information was received. The Panorama television programme stated in March 2012 that the subsidies granted to Eton were for 'environmental improvements', in effect "being paid without having to do any farming at all".

== University admissions (2010, 2011) ==
Figures obtained by The Daily Telegraph had revealed that in 2010 thirty-seven applicants from Eton were accepted by Oxford, while most state schools had difficulty obtaining entry even for pupils with the country's most impressive exam results. According to The Economist, Oxford and Cambridge admitted more Etonians each year than applicants from the whole country who qualify for free school meals. In April 2011, the Labour politician David Lammy said it was unfair that the University of Oxford had organised nine outreach events at Eton in 2010, although he admitted that it had, in fact, held fewer such events for Eton than for another public school, Wellington College. Nick Clegg, the Liberal Democrat leader, then accused Oxford and Cambridge of being "biased against poor students".

== Scholarship exam question about killing protesters (2011) ==
In May 2013, Eton College was criticised in several newspaper editorials about having asked potential scholarship students in 2011 how, if they were Prime Minister, they might defend the use of lethal force against twenty-five civilians by the Army, after two days of violent protests in which several policemen had been killed.

== Mistaken acceptance emails (2015) ==
In July 2015, Eton accidentally sent emails to 400 prospective students, offering them conditional entrance to the school in September 2017. The email was intended for nine students, but an IT glitch caused it to be sent to 400 additional families, who did not all have a place. In response, the school issued the following statement: "This error was discovered within minutes and each family was immediately contacted to notify them that it should be disregarded and to apologise. We take this type of incident very seriously indeed and so a thorough investigation, overseen by the headmaster Tony Little and led by the tutor for admissions, is being carried out to find out exactly what went wrong and ensure it cannot happen again. Eton College offers its sincere apologies to those boys concerned and their families. We deeply regret the confusion and upset this must have caused."

== Examination security breaches (2017) ==
In August 2017, the college's head of economics left after a breach of security in the "pre-U" exams, for which he was the principal examiner for his subject on behalf of Cambridge Assessment International Examinations (CAIE), which set the paper. As a result, CAIE gave Eton's candidates an "assessed mark" for the paper concerned, a procedure which adjusted their marks for an acceptable reason. In a letter to parents, the headmaster of Eton said "I am very sorry to be writing with this extremely unwelcome news. Regrettably this decision has had to be taken by the examination board because of the actions of a member of Eton's staff. This is a matter that, as headmaster, I have taken very seriously and Mr Tanweer has now left Eton's employment."

CAIE also disallowed papers written in the Art History examination, when it was discovered that one boy had been sent details in advance of the contents of the paper. He had shared this information with most of the boys taking the exam. This time, Eton's headmaster, Simon Henderson, said in a statement: “Following an investigation by Cambridge International Examinations, pupils at Eton who sat Pre-U art history this summer were deemed to be inadvertent recipients of confidential information in relation to one paper." He claimed that none of the boys had done anything wrong, and none of the staff at Eton were involved. CAIE confirmed that this case was linked to the scandal at Winchester, and that the exam material obtained by Winchester pupils had been shared with pupils at Eton. Following the allegations, the Schools minister asked for a review of rules for teachers who write exam questions.

== Dismissal of a schoolmaster (2020) ==
In November 2020, English teacher Will Knowland was dismissed by the Eton Head Master, Simon Henderson, over a video talk entitled 'The Patriarchy Paradox', which questioned "current radical feminist orthodoxy" and “why woke just don’t work”. The video was originally meant to be an official school lecture by Knowland but when staff asked him not to make it he turned it into a video. On the basis of legal advice he was dismissed from the school for gross misconduct after he refused six times a request by the headmaster to remove it. Some current and old Etonians have petitioned for his reinstatement on the grounds of free speech; others published an open letter calling the video “intellectually feeble, misogynistic and vitriolic”. Luke Martin, the head of the Perspectives course, resigned from that role after Knowland's dismissal, taking issue with what he described as "so-called progressive ideology" and "indoctrination" being promoted at the school.

Professor Steven Pinker of Harvard University originally supported Knowland but when he saw the video withdrew his support, saying "Only after watching the video later did I discover that his lecture went well beyond citing science and instead was a polemical and tendentious defense of masculine virtues." Despite withdrawing full support, however, Pinker did not identify any factual inaccuracies in the lecture, said he could "imagine a pedagogical rationale" for it and added "I don't think he should be fired".

Knowland appealed his dismissal to the Eton Board of Governors which upheld his dismissal on 14 December 2020. The Free Speech Union wrote to the governing body of Eton warning them it intended to "make a complaint to the Charity Commission requesting a statutory inquiry into the College under s.46 of the Charities Act 2011", adding that "it is not enough merely for the College to say that it advances education through freedom of thought in a politically balanced way. It must actually do so." Lord Bellingham wrote to The Times to say that Old Etonians would be withholding over £2 million in donations to the College as long as Henderson remained in post because of his 'woeful handling of this issue'. Eton College has since regarded this incident as "a real kerfuffle."

== Behaviour at event (2022) ==
In November 2022, Nigel Farage gave a talk at the school, to which a group of girls from a nearby state school had been invited. Farage later said the atmosphere during his talk was "riotous". Several reliable news sources reported allegations that the girls were subjected to misogynistic language and racial slurs and were booed, and that Eton College pupils had cheered Farage's "worst comments on migrants and Covid". The school apologised "unreservedly" for the "totally unacceptable" behaviour and said a number of its pupils had been "sanctioned" after an investigation.
