= Simon Henderson =

British teacher (born 1975)

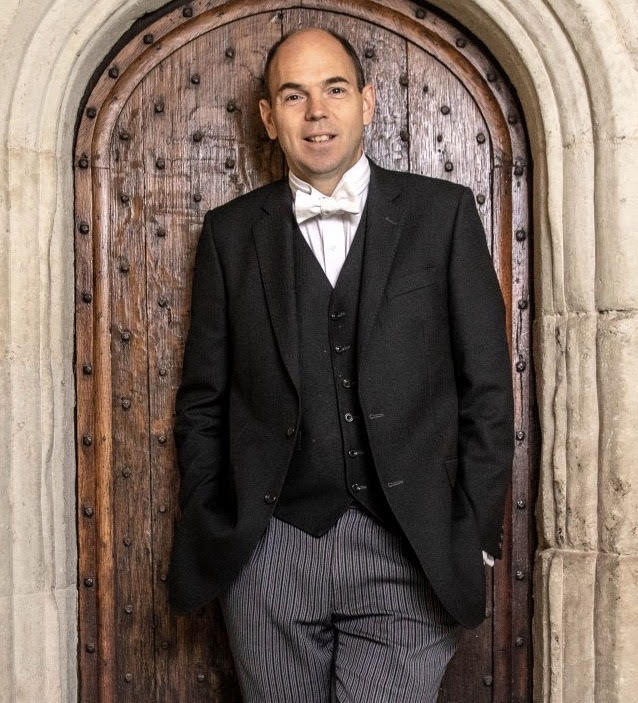
- Henderson in May 2022
- Born: 1976 (age 49–50)
- Education: Winchester College
- Alma mater: Brasenose College, Oxford (BA, PGCE)
- Occupation: Teacher
- Employers: Eton College; Bradfield College; Sherborne School; The Windsor Boys' School
- Website: www.etoncollege.com/about-us/meet-the-head-master/

Simon Henderson (born 1976) is a British teacher. He has been Head Master of Eton College since 2015, having previously served as headmaster of Bradfield College.

== Education ==
Henderson studied at Winchester College, and later received a bachelor's degree and Postgraduate Certificate in Education (PGCE) in history from the University of Oxford where he was a student of Brasenose College, Oxford.

== Career ==
Henderson first worked as a history and politics teacher at The Windsor Boys' School, before joining Eton College in 2001; he soon became head of history at the school, having also helped coach the 1st XI football team.

From 2009, Henderson served as Deputy Head of Sherborne School.

Henderson left Sherborne in 2011 when he was appointed Headmaster of Bradfield College.

=== Eton College ===
In 2015, Henderson was appointed Head Master of Eton College, being the youngest so far at 39 years old. In the same year, he became a governor of Holyport College and the London Academy of Excellence.

Henderson is credited with modernising Eton. When appointed he said he wanted to prepare young people for happiness and success in their personal lives and welcomed the greater awareness of emotional intelligence and mental health. His critics dubbed his plans a woke revolution. Henderson denied this and said in a podcast interview in 2023 that he embraced a label people misused to condemn things they disagreed with, saying "if by woke people mean I believe in kindness, understanding, respect, tolerance, treating people decently, trying to have empathy, trying to understand things from other people’s perspectives – then, guilty as charged." Henderson's supporters included the peer Lord Austin, who defended him in an article in The Telegraph.

In 2017, Henderson gave evidence to the House of Commons Education Select Committee after an exam malpractice scandal when an Eton teacher, who was also an examiner, was dismissed for breaching examination security and sharing confidential information with students.

In 2019, in response to the 'Abolish Eton' campaign, Henderson strongly defended independent schools and promoted the importance of partnership work, saying in an interview that he agreed there was inequality in the education system and supported Labour's ambitions to improve the lives of children across the country, but that “abolishing excellence” was not the way to achieve those aims. “I don’t think that by abolishing some of the best schools in the world, by confiscating and redistributing their assets, that we are going to improve the life chances of young people who have been left behind by the education system.” He advocated, instead, increased partnership between private and state schools.

During the COVID-19 pandemic in the United Kingdom, Henderson expanded Eton's online learning platform EtonX to state pupils and opened the school's accommodation to Key workers. He stated his interest in widening the school's intake to those of different backgrounds, saying "we want talented boys to be able to come to Eton whatever their financial circumstances". In response to a parent and alumni-led petition after the murder of George Floyd in May 2020, he pledged to focus more on teaching about systemic racism. He also stated he would increase efforts in diversifying the faculty after it was pointed out that there were only two black teachers at the school.

In late 2020 an English teacher, Will Knowland, was sacked by Eton after refusing to remove a controversial video 'The Patriarchy Paradox'. This led to discussions about free speech and teacher conduct, much of which played out in the public domain. Henderson, supported by the Provost at the time, Lord Waldegrave, insisted that Eton was not trying to shut down debate but that there were limits to the freedoms that teachers have and that he would not apologise for teaching pupils to respect each other's differences.

Also in late 2020, an Eton House Master, Matthew Mowbray, was jailed for 5 years for a number of abuse offences. At the time, Henderson said he was "outraged" by the way Mowbray had "abused his position of trust and betrayed those in his care". He added there was a "palpable sense of betrayal, coupled with shock and deep regret that we did not identify his offending earlier". Henderson said staff would be "redoubling our efforts to ensure that Eton remains an ever more open and supportive environment for all of our pupils, so that they can continue to feel confident to come forward with any concerns that they may have". He offered his "unreserved apologies" to those affected and paid tribute to their "extraordinary courage and dignity".

Alongside Sir Hamid Patel, Henderson was instrumental in forming the Eton Star Partnership with Star Academies and together they committed to opening three new sixth forms in Dudley, Oldham and Middlesbrough. Although the Middlesbrough project was later cancelled by the Labour government, the colleges in Dudley and Oldham are proceeding.

Henderson's commitment to modernising Eton also came to the fore in 2023, when he made clear that Eton saw itself as a 'charity for the advancement of education' which had a commitment to raising opportunity. In an interview with The Times, Henderson said "we genuinely see ourselves as an educational foundation that’s got a brilliant boys’ boarding school at its centre.” He added that although the college is “at the core of what we do”, other initiatives aimed at increasing educational opportunity and social mobility will be “front and centre of our plans for the next few years”.

In 2024 sixth form pupil, Raphaël Pryor, tragically died after collapsing on the school's playing fields. His parents later wrote about their experience of grief.

Later in 2024, Henderson took a period of medical leave from his role.

Under Henderson's leadership, spending on financial aid and bursaries soared and reached over £10 million in 2025, with initiatives such as the Rokos Scholarship and Orwell Award (for sixth form entry).

In January 2026, former Eton teacher Jacob Leland was jailed for abuse offences committed in 2012 (before Henderson was in post). Henderson issued a statement apologising to Leland's victims saying “Eton needs to acknowledge not only that something this serious was able to take place at our school, but also that it took several years for the details of what happened to come to light. As Head Master, I remain appalled that this abuse happened at Eton. Leland’s criminal conduct represents the most egregious breach of trust. Those who were directly impacted by Leland’s actions had the right to be safe and secure in our care. I reiterate my unreserved apologies to them on behalf of the school.”

In May 2026 it was announced that Henderson would leave Eton at the end of the Summer 2027, by which time he would have served 12 years in post. In his resignation letter to parents he said Eton is an “extraordinary institution” with “the ambition, capacity and resources to make a truly meaningful difference." He continued, writing “I feel, however, that the time is now right to pass this responsibility to someone new.”

The Provost of Eton, Sir Nicholas Coleridge wrote to parents to say: “Simon’s tenure will be remembered for many things — for his compassion and humanity, for encouraging the values of kindness and tolerance, and for his determination to ensure that Eton continues to evolve to meet the demands of the 21st century.” Coleridge said that Eton and Etonians had flourished under Henderson's guidance and that he had “led the school with great skill through some challenging moments, not least the Covid pandemic” as well as "introduced important changes to the way Eton is run which will serve us well as we look to the future."

== Personal life ==
Henderson's wife, Ali, worked as a civil servant at 10 Downing Street under Tony Blair and Gordon Brown. She is now the Chief Executive of Royal SpringBoard, a social mobility charity. They have two sons and two daughters.

Academic offices
Preceded by Tony Little	Head Master of Eton College; 2015–present	Incumbent
Preceded by Peter Roberts	Headmaster of Bradfield College; 2011–2015	Succeeded by Christopher Stevens
