= Charterhouse School =

Public school in Godalming, Surrey, England

Charterhouse
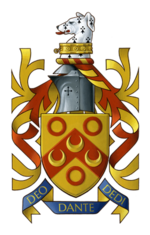

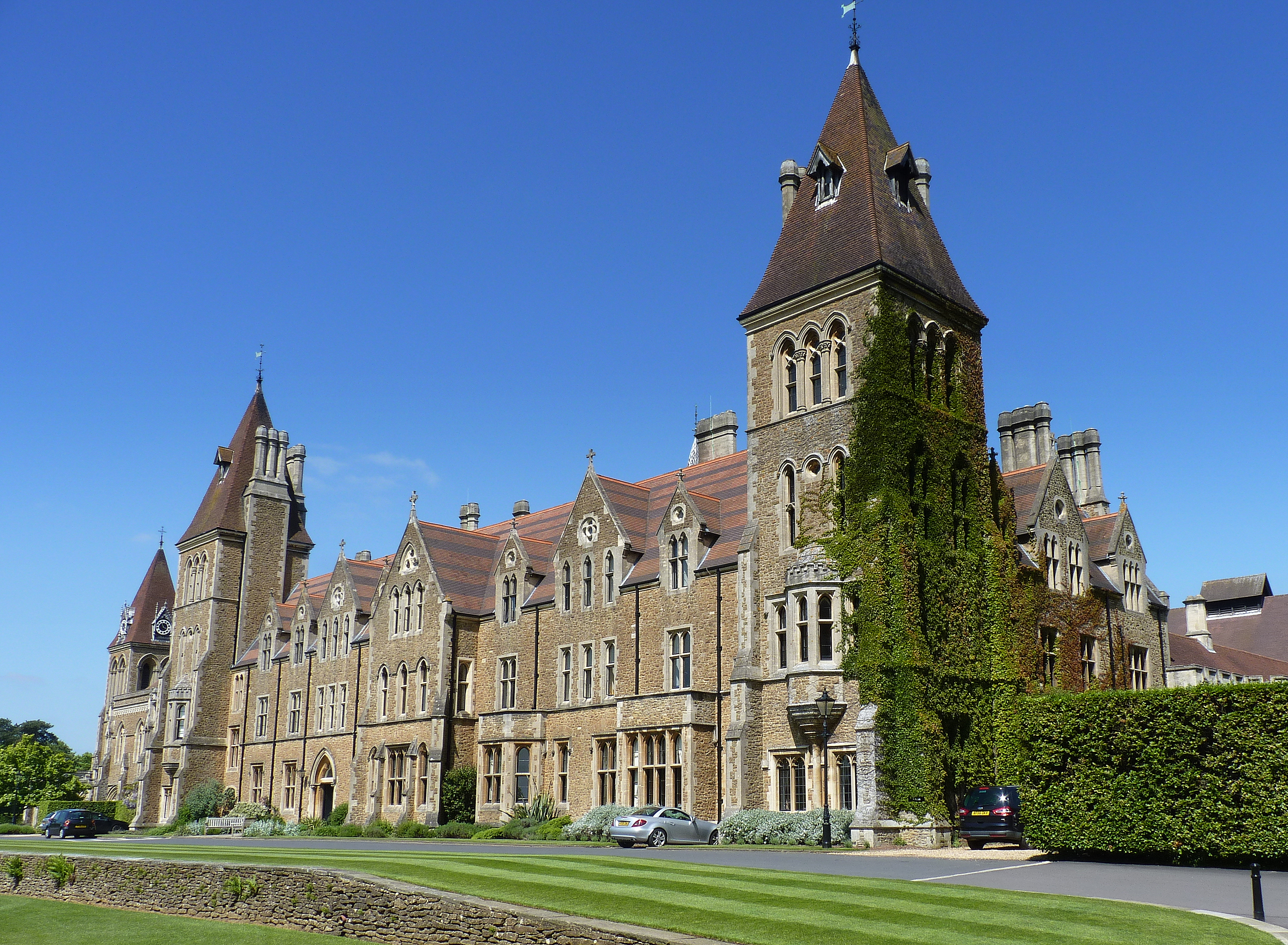
- Charterhouse School in 2013

Location
- Charterhouse Road; Godalming, Surrey, GU7 2DX; United Kingdom; 51°11′48″N 0°37′21″W

Information
- Type: Public school Private boarding school
- Motto: Latin: Deo Dante Dedi (God having given, I gave)
- Religious affiliation: Church of England
- Established: 1611; 415 years ago
- Founder: Thomas Sutton
- Department for Education URN: 125340 Tables
- Chair of Governors: Mark Bishop
- Head: Alex Peterken
- Principal Deputy Head: Sam Robinson
- Staff: ≈550
- Gender: Co-education
- Age: 13 to 18
- Enrolment: ≈1000
- Student to teacher ratio: 2:1
- Campus size: 250-acre (100 ha)
- Campus type: Semi-rural
- Houses: 15
- Colours: Pink, grey and maroon
- Publication: The Carthusian; The Charterhouse Review; The Greyfriar; The Greyhound
- Budget: £54,519,079 (2025)
- Revenue: £64,815,965 (2025)
- Alumni: Old Carthusians
- School song: Carmen Carthusianum
- Website: charterhouse.org.uk

Charterhouse is a public school (English private boarding and day school) for pupils aged 13–18, located in the market town of Godalming, in Surrey, England. Founded by Thomas Sutton in 1611 on the site of the old Carthusian monastery in Charterhouse Square, Smithfield, London, it educates over 1000 pupils. Charterhouse is one of the original nine English public schools reported upon by the Clarendon Commission in 1864 leading to its regulation by the Public Schools Act 1868.

Charterhouse charges full boarders around £48,038.40 (with the exclusion of VAT) per annum (2025/2026), alongside charging day pupils around £37,418.40 (with the exclusion of VAT) per annum (2025/2026). It educated the British Prime Minister Lord Liverpool and has numerous notable alumni.

== History ==
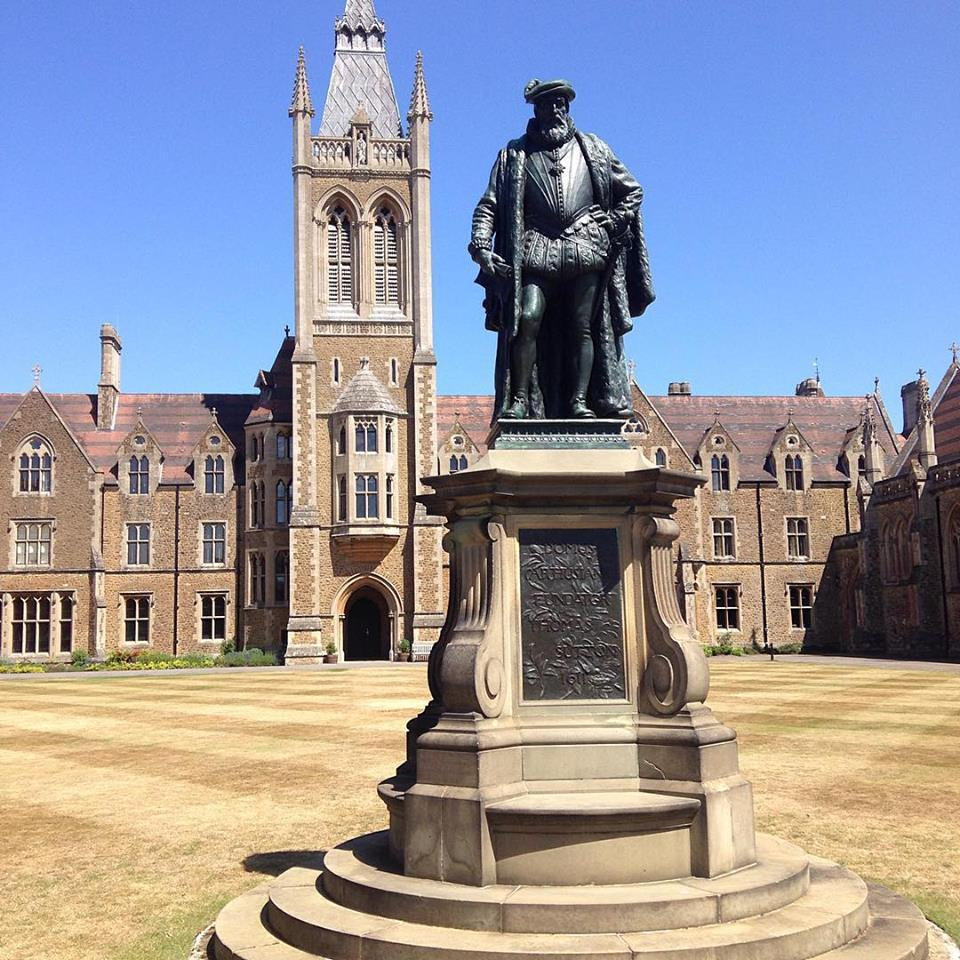
Statue of Thomas Sutton on Founder's Court

In May 1611, the London Charterhouse came into the hands of Thomas Sutton (1532–1611) of Knaith, Lincolnshire. He acquired a fortune by the discovery of coal on two estates which he had leased near Newcastle upon Tyne, and afterwards, moving to London, he carried on a commercial career. In 1611, the year of his death, he endowed a hospital on the site of the Charterhouse, calling it the hospital of King James, and in his will he bequeathed moneys to maintain a chapel, hospital (almshouse) and school. He died on 12 December, and subsequently the will was hotly contested but upheld in court, and the foundation was finally constituted to afford a home for eighty male pensioners (gentlemen by descent and in poverty, soldiers that have borne arms by sea or land, merchants decayed by piracy or shipwreck, or servants in household to the King or Queen), and to educate forty boys.

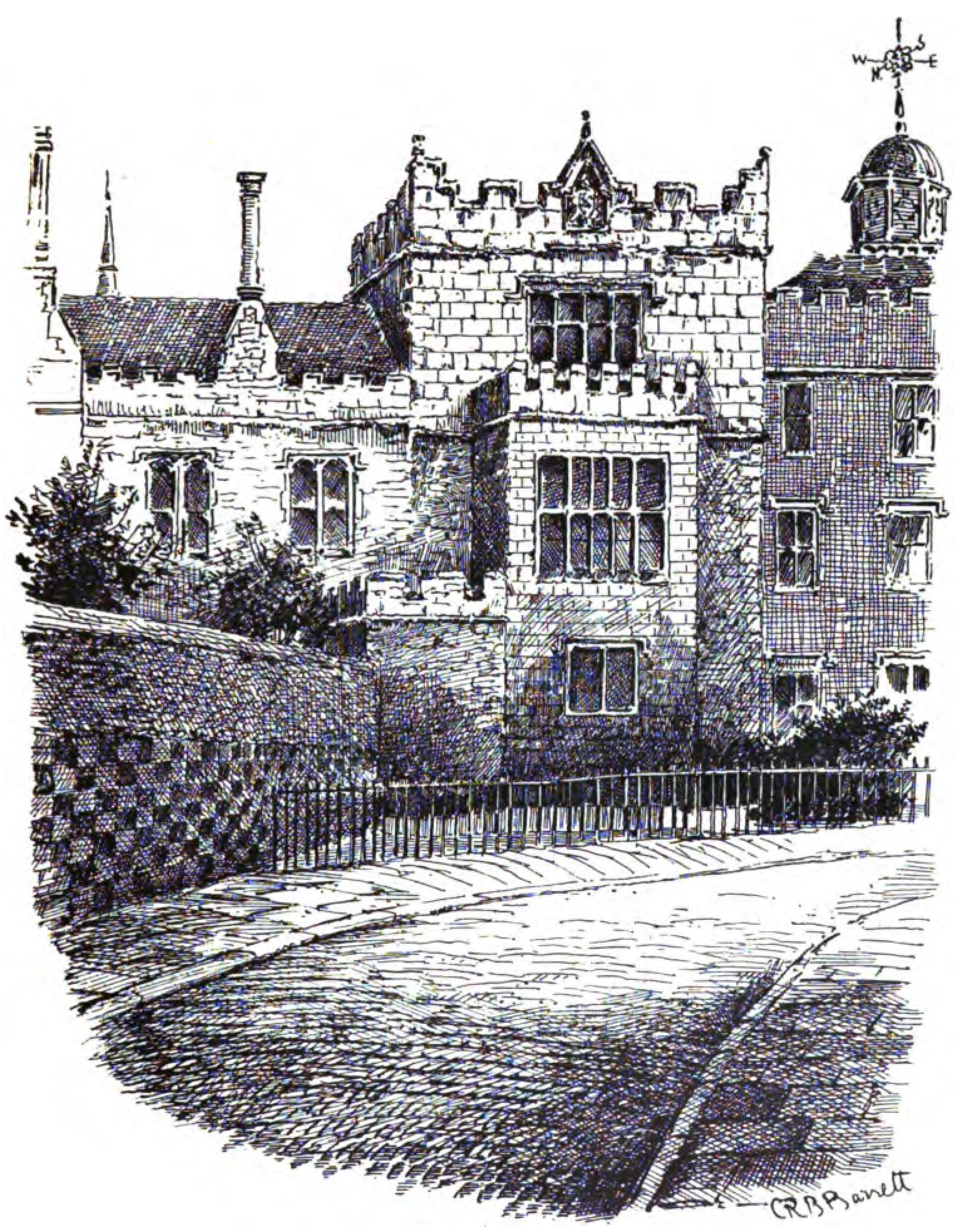
Brooke Hall at Charterhouse

Charterhouse established a reputation for excellence in hospital care and treatment, thanks in part to Henry Levett, an Oxford graduate who joined the school as a physician in 1712. Levett was widely esteemed for his medical writings, including an early tract on the treatment of smallpox. Levett was buried in Charterhouse Chapel and his widow married Andrew Tooke, the headmaster of Charterhouse.

Charterhouse School Act 1867
- Act of Parliament
- Parliament of the United Kingdom
- Long title: An Act for enabling the Governors of the Lands, Possessions, Revenues, and Goods of the Hospital of King James, founded in Charterhouse within the County of Middlesex, at the humble Petition and only Costs and Charges of Thomas Sutton Esquire, to sell the Site of the School of the said Hospital and other Lands; to acquire a new Site for the School, and to erect a new School thereon; and for other Purposes.
- Citation: 30 & 31 Vict. c. 8 Pr.

Dates
- Royal assent: 20 August 1867

Text of statute as originally enacted

The school was moved to its present site in 1872 by the then headmaster, William Haig Brown – a decision influenced by the findings of the Clarendon Commission of 1864, and authorised by a private act of Parliament, the Charterhouse School Act 1867 (30 & 31 Vict. c. 8 Pr.).

The school bought a 68-acre (28 ha) site atop a hill just outside Godalming. In addition to the main school buildings (designed by architect Philip Charles Hardwick), they constructed three boarding houses, known as Saunderites (once the headmaster's house, pronounced "sarnderites" rather than "sornderites"), Verites and Gownboys (for scholars, who were entitled to wear gowns). The school was built by Lucas Brothers, who also built the Royal Albert Hall and Covent Garden.

As pupil numbers grew, other houses were built alongside the approach road, now known as Charterhouse Hill. Each was titled with an adaptation of the name of their first housemaster, such as Weekites, Daviesites and Girdlestoneites. The last of these is still referred to as Duckites, reflecting the unusual gait of its original housemaster, even though he retired well over 100 years ago. There are now the original four 'old' houses plus eleven 'new' houses, six girls' houses (alongside one co-ed house, following the transition of Weekites and Girdlestoneites from boys' to girls'), making fifteen boarding houses in total. These fifteen Houses have preserved a unique identity (each with its own tie and colours) and pupils compete against each other in both sports and the arts. The two most recent boarding houses were opened by former pupil Jeremy Hunt ahead of the start of the 2021–22 academic year.

The school continued to expand over the 20th century. Further land was bought to the north and west, increasing the grounds to over 200 acres (81 ha), and a new school chapel was designed by Sir Giles Gilbert Scott (perhaps best known for designing the red telephone box) and consecrated in 1927 to commemorate almost 700 pupils who died in the First World War, making it the largest war memorial in England. Around 350 names have been subsequently added to commemorate those who died in the Second World War and other more recent conflicts.

An addition to the campus was seven new Houses, built in the 1970s, replacing late Victorian boarding houses which were demolished in 1977. Other newer buildings include the Art Studio, the John Derry Technology Centre, the Ben Travers Theatre, the Ralph Vaughan Williams Music Centre, the Halford Hewitt Golf Course, the Queen's Sports Centre, the Sir Greville Spratt athletics track and Chetwynd, a hall of residence for girls. In 2003, the School renovated its onsite Library. 2006 saw the opening of The Beveridge Centre for the Social Sciences. In 2007, a £3m Modern Languages building was completed.

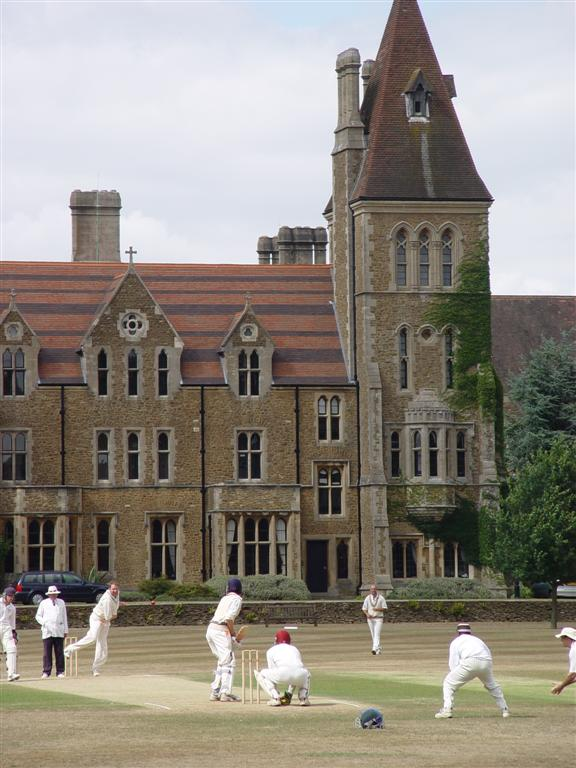
Charterhouse students playing cricket in 2006.

The school has a top 100 placing in the A level league tables, and in 2024 over 50% of pupils are awarded an A* or A grade at GCSE. In 2009, the school announced its decision to introduce the International Baccalaureate and Cambridge Pre-U, alongside the existing A level program. In 2012 Charterhouse had its best set of Cambridge Pre-U results with 96% of examinations taken awarded Distinction or Merit grades. Seventy-eight pupils achieved Distinctions (or their A level equivalent) in all subjects taken and twenty-one achieved the equivalent of A level A* grades in all their subjects. Twenty pupils were offered places at Oxford or Cambridge.

The 2017 ISI Educational Quality Inspection Report noted that "Pupils' academic and other achievements are high and often exceptional. Pupils' successes in external competitions, in academic distinctions and in sport, music and the creative and aesthetic arts are exceptional. Pupils' social development is outstanding. Pupils are polite, courteous and respectful of one another and of the adults who care for them. Relationships between pupils and staff are excellent. Pupils mature into independent and self-motivated pupils over the course of their time at school and are extremely well prepared, not only for the next stage of their lives, but also to contribute to society at large."

Charterhouse originally accepted boys only. The school began accepting girls in sixth form in 1971. In 2017 the school announced that it was moving to full co-education from the age of 13, and welcomed the first girls into Year 9 in September 2021. Since September 2023 there have been girls in every year group.

== Houses ==
There are four old boarding houses and eleven new houses in the White Book (a directory of names) order. In Charterhouse vocabulary an old house is one which was founded before the school's move to Godalming in 1872, as opposed to the new houses which were created later and are situated away from the main school. They are all distinguished by the colour of the pupils' ties, umbrellas and football team's stripes.

| House | Abbr. | Type | Colour |
|---|---|---|---|
| Saunderites | S | Old Boys | Orange |
| Verites | V | Old Boys | Light blue |
| Gownboys | G | Old Boys | Maroon |
| Girdlestoneites (known as 'Duckites') | g | New Boys (will be all girls by 2027) | Silver |
| Lockites | L | New Boys | Light green |
| Weekites | W | New Girls | Light red |
| Hodgsonites | H | New Boys | Dark blue |
| Daviesites | D | New Boys | Dark green |
| Bodeites | B | New Boys | Old gold |
| Pageites | P | New Boys | Lilac |
| Robinites | R | New Boys | Purple |
| Fletcherites | F | New Girls | Turquoise-blue |
| Sutton | Su | New Girls | Pink |
| Chetwynd | C | New Girls | Grey |
| Northbrook | N | New Girls | Green |

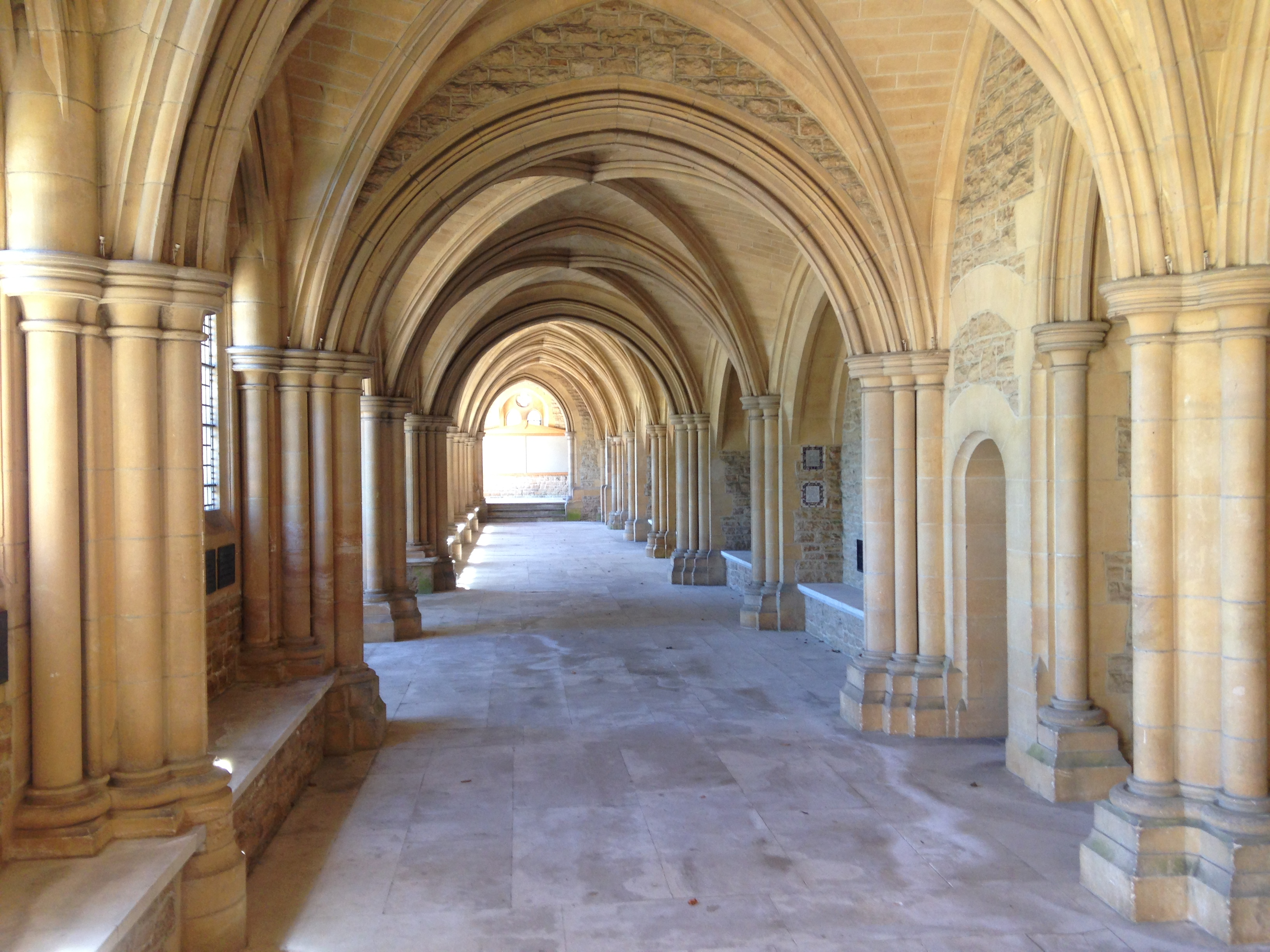
South African Cloisters.

In Autumn 2010, a new house was opened for sixth-form pupils, called Fletcherites, named after Frank Fletcher, a former headmaster. The house moved into the old Great Comp building, now renovated. Verites, Saunderites and Gownboys predate the move to Godalming in 1872 and are known as the "old" houses. Saunderites is named after its first Housemaster Dr. Saunders (Headmaster 1832–53) and it was the Headmaster's house, in that the headmaster would run not only the school but also one of the houses. Gownboys was named not after their original housemaster, but because it was the scholars' house, although scholars were distributed across all the houses after the transfer to Godalming. As was tradition, scholars wore gowns with their uniform and were treated as superior to other boys. There is no longer such a tradition and the scholars are now distributed throughout the various houses, on a random but numerically equal basis. There are still scholars in Gownboys, but in no greater proportion than any other house.

All new Houses apart from Bodeites are named after their founders (although Robinites was originally Robinsonites). Bodeites was originally Buissonites, named after the Head of Languages at the time. He ran off with the matron, and so the house was renamed Bodeites after the replacement, Mr Bode.

To keep up with the increasing number of female applicants to the school, Charterhouse began transitioning former boys' houses Weekites and Girdlestoneites into girl only houses. Weekites became coeducational at the start of OQ 2022 with 36 girls joining in Year 9, Year 10 and Lower Sixth, now fully transitioning into an all girls house since OQ 2025. Girdlestoneites also became coed in OQ of 2023, becoming girls only from September 2026. In 2024 it was announced that Lockites would become an all girls house by 2028, with Lockites accepting its first girls in OQ 2025.

== Sports ==
=== Origins of football ===
Association Football is the main Winter sport at the school. During the 1840s at both Charterhouse and Westminster School pupils' surroundings meant they were confined to playing their football in the cloisters, making the rough and tumble of the handling game that was developing at other schools such as Rugby impossible, and necessitating a new code of rules. Dingley Dell, the most active non-school team in the London area in the five years before the Football Association was established in 1863, played Charterhouse eight times between February 1860 and February 1863. During the formulation of the rules of the Association Football in the 1860s representatives of Charterhouse and Westminster School pushed for a passing game, in particular rules that allowed forward passing ("passing on"). Other schools (in particular Eton College, Shrewsbury School and Harrow) favoured a dribbling game with a tight off-side rule. It is claimed that Stoke Ramblers was formed in 1863 when former pupils of Charterhouse School formed a football club while apprentices at the North Staffordshire Railway works in Stoke-on-Trent.

By 1867 the Football Association had chosen in favour of the Charterhouse and Westminster game and adopted a "loose" off-side rule that permitted forward passing. The modern forward-passing game was a direct consequence of Charterhouse and Westminster football.

=== Cricket ground ===
The first recorded match on the school cricket ground came in 1859, when the school played Marlborough College. From its inception, the school has used the ground to take on a number of colleges in England. The cricket ground has held a single List-A match, which was played between Surrey and Warwickshire in the 1972 John Player League. Starting in 2006, the ground has held a number of Surrey Second XI fixtures in the Second XI Championship and Second XI Trophy.

== Herbarium ==
The School's Herbarium carries the Index Herbariorum designation GOD and is maintained as The Charterhouse School Herbarium in the University and Jepson Herbaria, University of California, Berkeley.

The scope of the collections is mainly the British Isles, although some plants are from Europe, South Africa and eastern North America. The principal collectors were James Edward Moxon, Rev. George Brown Moxon, Rev. Tullie Cornthwaite, Rev. Samuel Titmas (first curator of Charterhouse Museum), Frederick Yorke Brocas, Andrew Bloxam, William Gardiner, James Buckman and John Drew Salmon. The collections are currently being digitised and being released by the Botanical Society of Britain and Ireland, on the herbaria@home website. Over 1000 specimens have been databased and imaged and are available on the UC/JEPS specimen portal.

== Carthusian language ==
Known as Lingua Carthusiana, the terminology of this language has evolved over the centuries of Charterhouse's existence and is used within the Charterhouse community on a daily basis.

Terminology
| Term | Meaning |
|---|---|
| Adsum | A roll-call, taken in House (see also Jibs). |
| Artifex | The annual creative arts festival held in CQ. |
| Banco | Homework (also a set period for academic work from 7.00 pm to 8.45 pm). |
| Beak | A member of the teaching staff. |
| Big Ground | 1st XI Football Pitch. |
| Brooke Hall | The teaching and support staff's Common Room. Also the collective noun for the teachers. |
| BTT | The Ben Travers Theatre on Queen's Drive, opened in 1983, and named after the playwright who was an Old Carthusian. |
| Chapel | There are three chapels in the School: Memorial Chapel built as a memorial to Old Carthusians who were killed in the First World War; Millennium Chapel (MMC) which is situated in the north-east corner of the Memorial Chapel; Founders' Chapel (FC). |
| Crown | The School tuck shop. It is situated on the Long Walk facing Under Green. Students often refer to it as "crack". |
| DWR | Daniel Wray Room – Small meeting room attached to the Library. |
| Exeat | Half term break in the middle of each Quarter when all pupils go away from Charterhouse. Exeat in LQ is known as Queen's Exeat |
| Fathers | Every new pupil to the Under School is allotted a father (usually only slightly senior to him) to show him the ropes. |
| Green | 1st XI Cricket Pitch. |
| Grid | A bicycle |
| Hash | A lesson. |
| Hashroom | A classroom. |
| Homebill | The evening meal for pupils. |
| HHC | Hunt Health Centre |
| Jibs | Evening adsum in Houses. |
| JDTC | The John Derry Technical Centre, situated between Studio and Armoury, and opened in 1980. |
| Long Walk | Footpath across campus between Maniacs and Under Green connecting Princes Avenue with Queen's Drive. |
| PMP | Peter May Pavilion. |
| Pontifex | The annual inter-House cross-country races held in LQ |
| Quarter | The word used to describe terms. |
| quarter | The mid-morning break, which is generally after the first two or three lessons (hashes) |
| RVW (Music School) | Music school situated on the south side of Memorial Chapel and opened in 1984, in memory of Ralph Vaughan Williams who was an Old Carthusian. |
| Send-Up | When a pupil does a piece of work that a beak considers distinguished, they are sent with their work to the Senior Deputy Head. For every third send-up they are awarded a prize. |
| Tosh | A bath |
| Turning-Up | The general term for inter-House games which are organised on a league basis. |
| Yearlings | Pupils in their first year in the School who are also known as Fourths. |

== Fees ==
In any given year, there is some contention about which is the most expensive public school in England, depending on whether one compares day fees or boarding fees. In 2019, Charterhouse was reported to be among the most expensive schools for boarding pupils. Charging up to £11,415 per term in 2014/15, Charterhouse is the 7th most expensive HMC boarding school in the UK. For the 2022/23 academic year, day boarding fees were £36,540 and boarding was £44,220.

== Controversy ==
=== School fees cartel (2005) ===
In November 2005, the school was one of fifty of the country's leading independent schools which were found guilty of running an illegal price-fixing cartel, exposed by The Times newspaper, although the schools made clear that they had not realised that the change to the law (which had happened only a few months earlier) about the sharing of information had subsequently made it an offence. Each school was required to pay a nominal penalty of £10,000 and all agreed to make ex-gratia payments totalling three million pounds into a trust designed to benefit pupils who attended the schools during the period in respect of which fee information was shared.

Mrs Jean Scott, the head of the Independent Schools Council, said that independent schools had always been exempt from anti-cartel rules applied to business, were following a long-established procedure in sharing the information with each other, and that they were unaware of the change to the law (on which they had not been consulted). She wrote to John Vickers, the director-general of the Office of Fair Trading saying: "They are not a group of businessmen meeting behind closed doors to fix the price of their products to the disadvantage of the consumer. They are schools that have quite openly continued to follow a long-established practice because they were unaware that the law had changed."

=== Gary Lineker accusations (2010) ===
In August 2010, former English footballer Gary Lineker publicly accused Charterhouse of failing his son, George, in his bid for a place at university. Lineker claimed that the school had used him as a "guinea pig" by ditching A-Levels for the new Cambridge Pre-U. The school reacted by saying it was proud of its students' results. John Witheridge, then headmaster, defended the choice of the Pre-U as being more academically rigorous and educationally valid than the current A-Level standard in an article in The Spectator in August 2010.

=== Historic sexual abuse ===
In March 2012, it was reported that a 16-year-old had filmed fellow pupils while they showered, and stored the images on his laptop. The boy was taken into custody by Surrey Police for questioning. A police inquiry was subsequently established.

In April 2013, a physics teacher, Dean Johnson, resigned after allegations of an 'inappropriate relationship' with a former teenage girl pupil led to a police investigation. A police investigation followed, and resulted in a conviction after trial by a jury for the teacher who was found to be in possession of extreme pornography, which depicted a woman being hanged, in 2015; he was given an eight-month prison sentence, suspended for two years. A professional misconduct panel later found:

- that he had sex with her in a classroom at the school;
- that he had communicated his fantasies to the girl over Facebook;
- that he had asked what her underwear size was before buying stockings and presenting them to her gift-wrapped;
- that the relationship became sexual weeks after the girl turned 18.

As a result, in 2017, Johnson was made the subject of a prohibition order, prohibiting him from teaching in any school, sixth form college, relevant youth accommodation or children's home in England; the order was made with no provision for him to apply for any future restoration of his eligibility to teach.

In 2018, Cathy Newman, who attended the school on a scholarship, said that she was humiliated and sexually harassed while a pupil at the school. Other ex-pupils told The Times about experiences including a humiliating initiation ceremony at the school and flashing and groping incidents. Rebecca Willis, commenting on similar themes around the time reiterated these themes, but also commented on racism which resulted in Asian children leaving. The school has subsequently contacted former pupils to ask them to share concerns.

== Film location ==
The school is occasionally used as a film location. It was used as a filming location for Jules Shear's music video for his 1983 single "Whispering Your Name", in which Shear visits the school as a guest music teacher and a group of British schoolchildren mime to the chorus. It was used to represent the Palace of Westminster in the 2018 BBC drama Bodyguard and in seasons 4 and 5 of Netflix's The Crown where the Memorial Chapel and South African Cloisters are made to represent the House of Commons as well as the film Peterloo which used the chapel as the House of Lords.

In addition, a location outside Brooke Hall was used in the filming of The Crown season 5. It has previously been used in The Boys are Back, Jupiter Ascending, St Trinian's 2: The Legend of Fritton's Gold, The Mystery of Edwin Drood (an adaptation of a Charles Dickens novel), Foyle's War, An Ideal Husband, and Vampire Academy.

== Charterhouse Schoolmasters, Headmasters and Heads ==
Charterhouse Schoolmasters
- 1614–1624: Nicholas Grey
- 1624–1628: Robert Grey
- 1626–1628: William Middleton
- 1628–1643: Robert Brooke
- 1643–1651: Samuel Wilson
- 1651–1654: Thomas Bunkley
- 1654–1662: Norris Wood
- 1662–1679: Thomas Watson
- 1679–1728: Thomas Walker
- 1728–1731: Andrew Tooke
- 1731–1748: James Hotchkis
- 1748–1769: Eberard Lewis Crusius
- 1769–1791: Samuel Berdmore
- 1791–1811: Matthew Raine
- 1811–1832: John Russell
- 1832–1853: Augustus Saunders
- 1853–1858: Edward Elder
- 1858–1863: Richard Elwyn

Charterhouse Headmasters

- 1863–1897: William Haig Brown
- 1897–1911: Gerald Henry Rendall
- 1911–1935: Sir Frank Fletcher
- 1935–1947: Sir Robert Birley
- 1947: James Thompson (acting)
- 1947–1952: George Turner
- 1952–1964: Sir Brian W. M. Young
- 1964: Henry March (acting)
- 1965–1973: Oliver van Oss
- 1973–1981: Brian Rees
- 1981: Eric Harrison (acting)
- 1982–1993: Peter Attenborough
- 1993–1995: Peter Hobson
- 1995–1996: Clive Carter
- 1996–2013: John Witheridge
- 2014–2017: Richard Pleming
- 2017: Andrew Turner (acting)
- 2018–present: Alex Peterken

== Notable alumni ==
Former pupils are referred to as Old Carthusians, and current pupils as Carthusians.

=== Victoria Cross holders ===
Three Old Carthusians have won the Victoria Cross:

| Campaign | Name | Time at Charterhouse | Subsequent rank | Dates |
|---|---|---|---|---|
| Hunza-Nagar Expedition, India | Lieutenant Guy Hudleston Boisragon | Oration Quarter (OQ) (Autumn Term) 1878 to OQ 1880. | Brigadier | 1864–1931 |
| Mohmand Campaign, Bilot, India | Lieutenant James Morris Colquhoun Colvin | Cricket Quarter (CQ) (Summer Term) 1884 to CQ 1888) | Colonel | 1870–1945 |
| First World War | Lieutenant Eric Archibald McNair | CQ 1907 to CQ 1913; was Head of the School | Captain | 1894–1918 |

== See also ==
- List of English and Welsh endowed schools (19th century)
