= List of Head Masters of Eton College =

This is a list of Head Masters of Eton College since 1442.

Note: for explanation of alternative year dates in this list, such as '1494/5', see Old Style and New Style dates.

== List ==
=== 15th century ===
1. William Westbury (1442–1447) (Note: William Waynflete was traditionally reckoned as the first Head Master of Eton, serving for a brief period preceding Westbury in 1442, but modern scholarship does not support this claim. Waynflete did, however, become Provost of the college shortly afterwards.)
2. Richard Hopton (1447–1453)
3. Thomas Forster (1453)
4. Clement Smith (1453–1458)
5. John Peyntor (1458–1467)
6. Clement Smyth (1467–1470)
7. Walter Barber (1470 – c. 1479)
8. David Haubroke (c. 1479 – 1484)
9. Thomas Mache (1484–1485/6)
10. William Horman (1485/6–1494/5)
11. Edward Powell (1494/5–1496)

=== 16th century ===
12. Nicholas Bradbryg (1496–1501)
13. Robert Yong (1501–1502/3)
14. John Smyth (1502/3–1507)
15. John Goldyve (1507–1510)
16. Thomas Phylips (1510–1511)
17. Thomas Erlysman (1511–1515)
18. Robert Aldrich (1515–1521)
19. Thomas White (1521–1524)
20. John Goldwyn (1524–1528)
21. Richard Cox (1528–1534)
22. Nicholas Udall (1534–1541/2)
23. ? Smyth (1541/2–1544/5)
24. Robert Cater (1544/5–1547)
25. William Barker (1547–1555)
26. George Hampson (1555 – c. 1560) (Note: Clutton-Brock begins Malim's term in 1555.)
27. William Malim (c. 1560– c. 1563)
28. William Smyth (c. 1563 – c. 1571)
29. Reuben Sherwood (c. 1571 – 1579)
  Hugh Blythe (c. 1579?) (Note: Blythe is listed by Clutton-Brock, but not included in the school's official list.)
30. Thomas Ridley (1579–1583)
31. John Hammond (1583–1594)

=== 17th century ===
32. Richard Langley (1594–1611)
33. Richard Wright (1611)
34. Matthew Bust (1611–1630)
35. John Harrison (1630–1636)
36. William Norris (1636 – c. 1646)
37. Nicholas Grey (c. 1646 – 1648)
38. George Goad (1648)
39. Thomas Horne (1648–1654)
40. John Boncle (1654–1655)
41. Thomas Singleton (1655–1660)
42. Thomas Mountague (1660–1671)
43. John Rosewell (1671–1682)
44. Charles Roderick (1682–1690)

=== 18th century ===
45. John Newborough (1690–1711)
46. Andrew Snape (1711–1720)
47. Henry Bland (1720–1728)
48. William George (1728–1743)
49. William Cooke (1743–1745)
50. John Sumner (1745–1754)
51. Edward Barnard (1754–1765)
52. John Foster (1765–1773)
53. Jonathan Davies (1773–1792)

=== 19th century ===
54. George Heath (1792–1802)
55. Joseph Goodall (1802–1809)
56. John Keate (1809–1834)
57. Edward Craven Hawtrey (1834–1853)
58. Charles Old Goodford (1853–1862)
59. Edward Balston (1862–1868)
60. James John Hornby (1868–1884)

=== 20th century ===
61. Edmond Warre (1884–1905)
62. Edward Lyttelton (1905–1916)
63. Cyril Alington (1916–1933)
64. Claude Aurelius Elliott (1933–1949)
65. Robert Birley (1949–1964)
66. Anthony Chenevix-Trench (1964–1970)
67. Michael McCrum (1970–1980)
68. Eric Anderson (1980–1994)

=== 21st century ===
69. John Lewis (1994–2002)
70. Tony Little (2002–2015)
71. Simon Henderson (2015–present)

== See also ==
- List of Provosts of Eton College
- Master in College
