= Edward Elder =

Edward Elder may refer to:

- Edward Elder (headmaster) (1812–1858), English teacher
- Edward the Elder (c. 874-7 – 924), English king
