= William Malim =

English academic (1533–1594)

William Malim (1533–1594) was an English academic, schoolmaster and Neo-Latin author.

== Life ==
Malim was born at Staplehurst in Kent. He was educated at Eton College, and went on to King's College, Cambridge, where he was admitted a scholar, 14 August 1548. Three years later he was made a fellow. He graduated B.A. in 1553, and M.A. in 1556. On 11 January 1555 he was discommuned for a fortnight, but for what offence is not known.

Malim found time for foreign travel; on his own account he visited Constantinople, Antioch, Jerusalem, and other eastern cities. On 14 January 1559 he was directed by his college to study civil law. But he discontinued the study on his appointment as headmaster of Eton in 1561, in succession to William Barker, and resigned his fellowship at King's soon afterwards. While at Eton he drew up a Consuetudinarium, or account of the rules and observances of the college, probably composed, with a view to the visit of the royal commissioners in 1561.

Malim seems to have been a severe head-master. It was in his time that the cases of flogging, followed by the escape of some scholars from Eton, occurred, which suggested to Roger Ascham, in 1563, the composition of his Scholemaster. He is said to have remained ten years at Eton. He was made prebendary of Biggleswade in Lincoln Cathedral, 3 April 1569. At Christmas 1573 he was appointed High Master of St Paul's School, London. Less than seven years later he petitioned Lord Burghley for another preferment; but he remained at St. Paul's till 8 November 1581, when a successor was appointed.

Malim is supposed to have died shortly before 15 August 1594.

== Works ==
Malim wrote in a fluent though affected Latin style. His extant pieces are chiefly commendatory Latin verses or letters prefixed to the works of friends: such as the De Republica Anglorum Instauranda of Sir Thomas Chaloner, Nicholas Carr's translation of the Olynthiacs, 1571, Edward Grant's Spicilegium, 1575, and the Chartæ Geographicæ Zutphaniæ, 1586. Congratulatory verses or orations by Malim appear in:

- De Adventu … Elizabethæ Reginæ ad Arces Windesorienses, &c., when the queen was driven from London to Windsor by the plague in 1563.
- Oratio Latina Duci Ioanni Casimir, 1578.
- Carmina Scholæ Paulinæ in Regni Elizabethæ initium (MS. Reg. 12. a. lxvii, in the British Library). In this collection, which he probably edited in 1573, although many of the pieces were written earlier, Malim's own contribution begins on leaf 2. One copy is by a "ffranciscus Verus", supposed to be Sir Francis Vere.

Malim also translated from the Italian a short pamphlet on the successful siege of Famagusta in Cyprus by the Ottoman Empire, published by John Daye, London, 1572. The long title begins: The True Report of all the successe of Famagosta, of the antique writers called Tamassus, a citie in Cyprus, &c. The dedication to the Earl of Leicester, which occupies seven pages out of a total of forty-eight, is dated "from Lambheth, the 23rd of March, An. 1572." The original by Nestore Martinengo was L'Assedio e presa di Famagosta. This translation was then used by George Gascoigne in his Devise of a Maske, written for Anthony Browne, 1st Viscount Montagu.

One of the sets of verses in Geoffrey Whitney's Choice of Emblemes, 1586, p. 152, is addressed to Malim.
