= Tony Little (headmaster) =

Anthony Richard Morrell "Tony" Little FRSA (born 1954, Hillingdon) is a British schoolmaster. Little spent seven years as housemaster of Brentwood School, seven years as the headmaster of Chigwell School, six years as headmaster of Oakham School, and 13 years as Head Master of Eton College. From 2015 to 2018 he was Chief Education Officer of GEMS Education responsible for ensuring the quality of education across the global chain. From September 2018 he became President of WLSA Shanghai Academy, developing a new generation of not-for-profit, needs-blind high schools in China. He also became Chair of the Laurus Trust, a multi-academy trust operating in the Manchester area. Since September 2020 he is the Chair of Governors at London Academy of Excellence, Stratford.

== Education ==
Little was educated at Eton College in Berkshire where he was a music scholar, and at Corpus Christi College, Cambridge, where he was a choral scholar and gained an upper second class honours degree in English language and literature. He received a Master of Arts in English as well as Postgraduate Certificate in Education (Distinction) at Homerton College, Cambridge.

== Career ==
Little was an assistant master, teaching English, and then later a housemaster at Tonbridge School in Kent from 1977 to 1982. He served as a housemaster and head of English and drama at Brentwood School, Essex from 1982 to 1989. From 1989 to 1996, Little was headmaster of Chigwell School in Essex. He then served as Headmaster of Oakham School in Rutland from 1996 to 2002.

In July 2001, he was appointed Head Master of Eton College, and assumed the post in September 2002.

Little stepped down from Eton in 2015, and was appointed Global Chief Education Officer of GEMS Education, until July 2018. He became Chair of the Laurus Trust in September 2017 and President of WLSA Shanghai Academy in September 2018.

He is the author of An Intelligent Person's Guide to Education, published by Bloomsbury Publishing PLC in July 2015, ISBN 978-1472913111 and "Adolescence - How to Survive It", published by Bloomsbury PLC in June 2019 ISBN 9781472944702

== Other appointments ==
- Member of The Headmasters' and Headmistresses' Conference, 1990–2015
- Fellow of the Royal Society of Arts, 1991
- Honorary Educational Advisor to The World Trust of Janusz Piotrowicz
- Governor of Westminster School
- Governor of Sevenoaks School
- Governor of Northwood College, 1990 to 1998
- Governor of St Albans School, 1994–2014
- Governor of Oakham School
- Governor of Holyport College 2013–2015
- Governor of the London Academy of Excellence 2011–2015
- Governor of The Windsor Boys' School 1989–2015
- Governor of Norwich School
- Chairman of the Mvumi School Trust

Academic offices
Preceded by John Lewis	Head Master of Eton College; 2002–2015	Succeeded by Simon Henderson
