= Jonathan Davies (English priest) =

English schoolmaster and Anglican priest (c. 1736 – 1809)

Jonathan Davies FRS (c. 1736 – 1809) was an English schoolmaster and Anglican priest, a Canon of Windsor from 1782 to 1791.

== Career ==
He was educated at King's College, Cambridge, receiving an MA in 1736.

He was appointed:

- Headmaster of Eton College, Berkshire 1773–1792
- Rector of Scaldwell, Northamptonshire, 1774
- Provost of Eton College, 1791–1809

He was appointed to the eighth stall in St George's Chapel, Windsor Castle in 1782 and held the canonry until 1791. He was elected a fellow of the Royal Society in 1789.

He died in 1809 and was buried at Eton College chapel.

Academic offices
Preceded by John Foster	Head Master of Eton College; 1773–1792	Succeeded by George Heath
Preceded by William Hayward Roberts	Provost of Eton College; 1791–1809	Succeeded by Joseph Goodall
