= Greville Spratt =

British underwriter who was the 660th Lord Mayor of London from 1987 to 1988

Sir Greville Douglas Spratt (1 May 1927 – 13 December 2012) was a British underwriter who was the 660th Lord Mayor of London from 1987 to 1988.

== Biography ==
Spratt was educated at Leighton Park School and Charterhouse School. He served with the Coldstream Guards from 1945 to 1946, before going to an Officer Cadet Training Unit and on 7 June 1946 being commissioned into the Oxfordshire and Buckinghamshire Light Infantry as a second lieutenant. He was seconded into the Arab Legion from 1946 to 1948, serving in Palestine, Transjordan, and Egypt.

Spratt joined Lloyd's of London in 1948 and was an underwriting member from 1950 to 1998. He also joined the Infantry Battalion of the Honourable Artillery Company as a private, before being commissioned in the HAC in 1950. He was appointed commanding officer of the HAC in 1962, with the rank of lieutenant colonel. He was Regimental Colonel from 1966 to 1970 and again in 1978. He was an Aide-de-Camp to the Queen from 1973 to 1978.
