= Joseph Goodall =

English cleric and Provost of Eton

Joseph Goodall (1760–1840) was an English cleric and Provost of Eton.

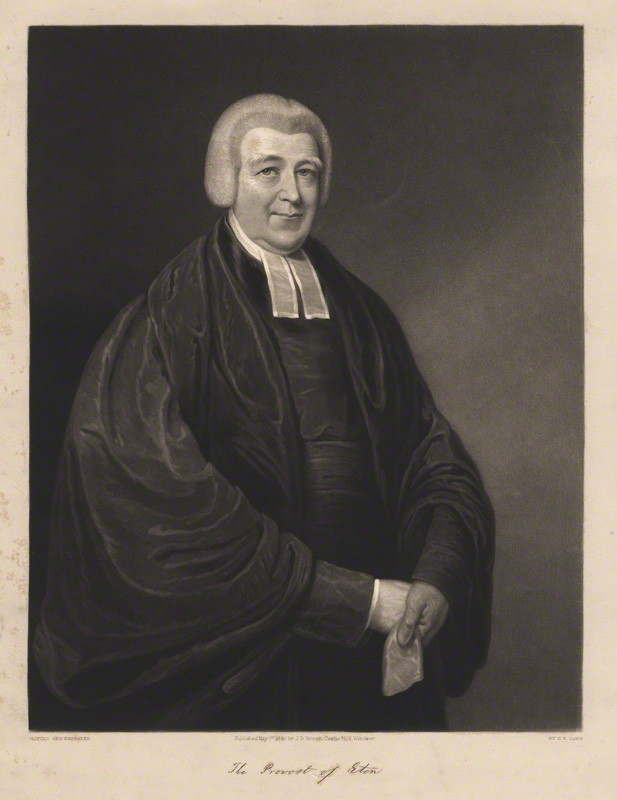
Joseph Goodall, engraving by Henry Edward Dawe

== Life ==
He was born on 2 March 1760, in Westminster, the son of Joseph Goodall, and after attending Eton College he was elected to King's College, Cambridge in 1778. There he gained Browne's Medals in 1781 and 1782, and the Craven Scholarship in 1782. He graduated with a B.A. in 1783 and an M.A. in 1786.

In 1783, Goodall became a Fellow of King's and assistant-master at Eton. In 1801, he was appointed headmaster of the school, which kept up its numbers and reputation under him. In 1808, he became canon of Windsor on the recommendation of his friend and schoolfellow Marquess Wellesley. In 1809, he succeeded Jonathan Davies as Provost of Eton.

Goodall's discipline was mild, but he is said to have been an insuperable obstacle to any innovations at Eton. In 1827, he accepted the rectory of West Ilsley, Berkshire, from the chapter of Windsor. He was also rector of Hitcham, Buckinghamshire, where Charles Goddard served as a curate. Goodall was one of those noted as a pluralist by John Wade, in his Extraordinary Black Book (1832).

== Death and legacy ==
William IV once said "When Goodall goes I'll make [Keate] provost"; to which Goodall replied, "I could not think of 'going' before Your Majesty." He died on 25 March 1840, and was buried in the College Chapel on 2 April. A statue in the College Chapel was raised to his memory by a subscription headed by the Queen Dowager. He founded a scholarship of £50 a year, to be held at Oxford or Cambridge.

== Works ==
Goodall wrote Latin verses, of which some are in the Musæ Etonenses (1817, i. 146, ii. 24, 58, 87). The second volume is dedicated to him.

Academic offices
Preceded by George Heath	Head Master of Eton College; 1802–1809	Succeeded by John Keate
Preceded by Jonathan Davies	Provost of Eton College; 1809–1840	Succeeded by Francis Hodgson
