= Robert Birley =

English educationalist (1903–1982)

Sir Robert Birley KCMG (14 July 1903 – 22 July 1982) was an English educationalist who was head master of Charterhouse School, then Eton College, and an anti-apartheid campaigner.

He acquired the nickname "Red Robert", as even his moderate liberal politics caused concern for the conservative members of the college's governing body, the Provost and Fellows. His predecessor, Claude Aurelius Elliott was appointed provost and as chairman of the governing body, living next door to Birley, he could keep an eye on him.

== Biography ==
Birley was educated at Rugby and Balliol College, Oxford. He began his career as a history master at Eton in 1926 and in 1935 was appointed as headmaster of Charterhouse. During this time, he was the principal author of the Fleming Report of 1944 on the relationship between the public schools and mainstream education.

In 1947, after the Second World War, Birley became Educational Advisor to the Control Commission in the British Zone in Germany, responsible for educational reconstruction, and played an important role in the rewriting of Nazi history textbooks, removing their racist bent. From 1947 to 1949 he gave important support to Lilo Milchsack, who formed the Anglo-German Association to improve post-war relations. Birley returned to support these efforts after he left Germany in 1949.

In 1949, he was invited by the BBC to deliver the annual Reith Lectures. The series of four radio broadcasts in October and November 1949 were titled Britain in Europe: Reflections on the Development of a European Society. Birley considered the history and future impact of Britain's increasing involvement with Europe. The first of these lectures was titled "The Problem of Patriotism," the second "The Meeting of Britain and Europe," the third "Problem of a Common Language," and the fourth and final lecture "Britain's Contribution to a European Society."

In 1949, Birley was appointed Head Master of Eton, where he remained until 1963. In 1952 Birley was guest of honour at Monkton Combe School when he opened the school's new Memorial Building. The speech he made was described as "one of the most outstanding in the history of the School" in which he deplored pessimism about the future of public schools.

He subsequently became a visiting professor of education at Witwatersrand University, South Africa from 1964 to 1967. In 1967 he was appointed professor and head of Department of Social Science and Humanities at City University a post he held until 1971. In the 1970s he regularly visited Atlantic College in Wales, and taught weeklong classes on history, exploring the subject as inherently contested. He wrote and lectured extensively on education, apartheid and human rights issues, and the Robert Birley memorial lectures are a tribute to his contributions.

From 1968 to 1982, Birley was professor of rhetoric at Gresham College, London. He was President of the Bibliographical Society from 1979 to 1980.

Birley's biography, Red Robert: a life of Robert Birley, by Arthur Hearnden, appeared in 1984. A collection of his writings, History and Idealism: Essays, Lectures, Sermons and Letters of Robert Birley, appeared in 1990, edited by his son-in-law, Brian Rees.

== Birley family ==
His grandfather, Arthur Birley (1834–1912), was the brother of Hugh Birley, who served as Member of Parliament for Manchester from 1868 to 1883.

== See also ==
- Gresham Professor of Rhetoric

Academic offices
Preceded by Claude Aurelius Elliott	Head Master of Eton College; 1949–1964	Succeeded by Anthony Chenevix-Trench
