= John Rosewell (headmaster) =

Headmaster of Eton College

John Rosewell (c. 1635 – 30 October 1684) was Headmaster of Eton College, England (1671–1682).

== Education ==
John Rosewell received his early education at Berwick-upon-Tweed, Northumberland. He matriculated at Magdalen Hall, Oxford, on 2 April 1652, and subsequently moved to Corpus Christi College, Oxford. He received his B.A. degree on 16 October 1655, was elected Fellow of Corpus Christi in 1656, and received his M.A. on 17 March 1658/9. John (Johannes) Rosewell was ordained as a Deacon at Christ Church Cathedral, Oxford on 31 March 1661. He received his B.D. degree on 31 October 1667 and was incorporated at Cambridge in 1668.

== Early years ==
While at Corpus Christi, in the period 1653–54, Rosewell was prescribed for "a very hot stomach" by the apothecary, Jeremiah Webbe. From 1666, he made regular contributions to the "New Building", Corpus Christi College, reaching a total of £744 by February 1668.

== Reputation ==
Rosewell succeeded Thomas Mountague as Head Master of Eton in 1671 and was the last "alien" (non-Etonian) to be elected to the position for many years. He was held in high esteem for his learning. Rosewell seems to have greatly increased the reputation of the school, and is styled by one of his pupils, ludimagister celeberrimus (renowned schoolmaster). A manuscript records in 1678 that "then it was that the foundation of its (Eton's) present grandeur was laid".

== First list of Eton School ==
During his period as Head Master, in 1678, a list of the school was produced — the earliest complete list extant — giving the names of 207 boys, 78 of whom were in College. No other list is forthcoming for another forty years. It is written, not printed, on a half-sheet of parchment. The seventh form had long been abolished, the sixth being the highest. In each form, except the sixth, the names of Collegers and Oppidans are given separately. In this list also, brothers were distinguished by the style of major, minor, and minimus, and so forth, as at the present day.

== Resignation ==
In 1678, Rosewell obtained a canonry at Windsor, and in 1682 resigned the headmastership. According to a rumour of the day, his resignation was caused by his falling into a fit of melancholy madness, in consequence of having killed a boy by immoderate flogging, and fancying that the King's messengers were coming to arrest him. The story does not sound very probable, and the less so as he was elected a Fellow of Eton in 1683.

His successor as Head Master was Charles Roderick, Etonian and Kingsman, who had been Usher (Lower Master) from 1676.

== Will ==
John Rosewell wrote his will on 24 June 1684 leaving his valuable library to Corpus Christi College, Oxford; £300 for "the benefit and use of Eton College School"; £200 to the Church of Windsor; £50 to his "kinsman" William Rosewell (Eton Scholar and later Master of King's College School, Cambridge); £40 to the town of Berwick-upon-Tweed; and £20 towards the erecting and building of a Chapel for St Mary Magdalen Hall, Oxford. He died on 30 October 1684.

== See also ==
- List of headmasters of Eton College
