= Richard Langley (priest) =

Richard Langley D.D. (1563 – May 1615) was Head Master of Eton College from 1591 - 1611 and a Canon of Windsor for a few days in 1615.

== Career ==
He was King’s Scholar at Eton College and educated at King's College, Cambridge, where he graduated with BA in 1585, MA in 1588, B.D. in 1595 and D.D. in 1607.

He was appointed:

- Head Master of Eton College 1594 - 1611
- Rector of Horton, Buckinghamshire
- Rector of Paglesham and Latchingdon, Essex 1608 - 1615

He was appointed to the third stall in St George's Chapel, Windsor Castle in 1615 but died a few days after his appointment.
