= John Foster (canon) =

John Foster (died 1773) was a Canon of Windsor from 1772 to 1773 and Headmaster of Eton College from 1765 to 1773.

== Career ==
He was King's Scholar at Eton College then educated at King's College, Cambridge and graduated BA in 1753, MA in 1756, and DD in 1766.

He was appointed Headmaster of Eton from 1765 to 1773

He was appointed to the twelfth stall in St George's Chapel, Windsor Castle in 1772, and held the stall until 1773.

== Notes ==
Academic offices
Preceded by Edward Barnard	Head Master of Eton College; 1765–1773	Succeeded by Jonathan Davies
