= Thomas Hatcher (antiquary) =

English antiquarian (died 1583)

Thomas Hatcher (died 1583) was an English antiquarian.

== Life ==
He was born at Cambridge, son of John Hatcher, MD, Regius Professor of Physic. He was educated at Eton College, and was elected in 1555 to King's College, Cambridge. He proceeded Bachelor of Arts in 1559–60, and his M.A. in 1563.

Hatcher was a Fellow of King's, from 1558 to 1566. In 1565, being dissatisfied with the government of Provost Philip Baker, Hatcher along with some other members of the college, wrote a letter of complaint against him to William Cecil. He studied law in Gray's Inn, where he was admitted in 1565, and then medicine.

Despite his, as a man of means, Hatcher did not follow a profession. In later life he resided on his father's estate at Careby, near Stamford, Lincolnshire. He was on good terms with John Caius, who in 1570 inscribed to him his work De Libris suis propriis; John Stow was another friend and correspondent.

Hatcher was buried at Careby on 14 November 1583.

== Family ==
Hatcher married Catharine, daughter and heiress of Thomas Rede, son of Richard Rede of Wisbech, and had: a son John, elected from Eton to King's College, Cambridge, in 1584, who succeeded to the estates of his grandfather, Dr. John Hatcher, and received the honour of knighthood; Henry, sometime of St John's College, Cambridge; William; Alice, wife of Nicholas Gunter, sometime mayor of Reading; and other daughters.

== Publications ==
- Author:
  - Catalogus Præpositorum, Sociorum, et Scholarium Collegii Regalis Cantabrigiæ, a tempore fundationis ad annum 1572, manuscripts in Gonville and Caius College Library, 173, f. 119; British Library Harley MS 614; British Library Add MSS 5954 and 5955. Anthony Wood had a copy of this work, which he frequently quotes.
    - The catalogue was continued to 1620 by John Scott, coroner of the college, from that year to 1646 by George Goad, and later extended to 1746 by William Cole, whose History of King's College, Cambridge is extant as British Library Addit. MSS. 5814–17.
  - De viris illustribus Academiæ Cantab. regiæ, manuscript. This was said to be in two books, in centuries, according to the method of John Bale. Not now thought to be extant.
- Latin verses
  - On the restitution of Bucer and Fagius, 1560
  - In commendation of Bishop Alley's Poor Man's Library, 1571
  - In commendation of Carr and Wilson's Demosthenes
  - On the death of Nicholas Carr
  - On Frere's translation of Hippocrates
  - In Paracelsitas, MS. C.C.C. Oxon. 258, f. 67
  - On the death of Dr. Whittington gored by a bull; in John Foxe's Acts and Monuments.
- Editor
  - Walter Haddon's Lucubrationes et Poemata, 1567, dedicated to William Cecil
  - Nicholas Carr's orations De scriptorum Britannicorum paucitate, 1576.

== Notes ==
Attribution

This article incorporates text from a publication now in the public domain: Stephen, Leslie; Lee, Sidney, eds. (1891). "Hatcher, Thomas (d.1583)". Dictionary of National Biography. Vol. 25. London: Smith, Elder & Co.
