= John Lewis (headmaster) =

English school administrator

John Elliot Lewis (born 23 February 1942) was the Head Master of Eton College from 1994 to 2002.

Born in New Zealand in 1942, Lewis attended King's School and King's College, Auckland. He gained a double first in Classics from Corpus Christi College, Cambridge, and taught at Eton between 1971 and 1980, holding the post of Master in College between 1975 and 1980. He was a distinguished rugby player and cricketer. From 1980 to 1994, Lewis was the Headmaster of Geelong Grammar School in Australia, which had been attended by Charles, King of the United Kingdom and Rupert Murdoch.

The Royal Commission into Institutional Responses to Child Sexual Abuse found that Geelong Grammar School knew that boarding house assistant Philippe Trutmann, who worked at the school's Highton campus in the 1980s and 1990s, was accused of improper conduct in 1985 and failed to take any action. Phillippe Trutmann was convicted in 2005 of sexually abusing at least 40 male students and sentenced to six-and-a-half years' jail. The Royal Commission Counsel Assisting stated that "Mr Lewis' failures to take proper steps to respond to allegations of child sexual abuse and his failure to implement a proper system to deal with allegations of child sexual abuse fell below the standards expected of a principal of a school at the time of his actions."

Lewis took up the Headship of Eton College in 1994. Sir Eric Anderson, the previous head master, had led Eton College to second place in the league table of independent schools. Under Lewis, it dropped to 29th place. He supervised the education of Princes William and Harry.

Lewis retired in August 2002, having reached his 60th birthday.

Academic offices
Preceded by Sir Eric Anderson	Head Master of Eton College; 1994–2002	Succeeded by Tony Little
