= Eric Anderson (teacher) =

British educator (1936–2020)

Sir Eric Anderson KT FRSE
- Born: William Eric Kinloch Anderson; 27 May 1936
- Died: 22 April 2020 (aged 83)
- Education: George Watson's College; University of St Andrews (MA); Balliol College, Oxford (MLitt)
- Occupation: Academic
- Spouse: Poppy Mason
- Children: 2 including David Anderson

Sir William Eric Kinloch Anderson KT FRSE (27 May 1936 – 22 April 2020) was a British teacher and educator, who was headmaster of Eton College from 1980 to 1994 and provost of Eton College from September 2000 to January 2009. He is notable also for having played a part in the education of a King and four Prime Ministers, at four separate educational institutions (two in Scotland and two in England).

== Early life and education ==
Anderson was born on 27 May 1936, eldest of three children of William James Kinloch Anderson (1907–1997), managing director and chairman of the Edinburgh-based kilt-making business Kinloch Anderson, and Margaret Gouinlock Harper. He was schooled at George Watson's College, Edinburgh. He graduated from the University of St Andrews with first-class honours in English language and literature and then a Master of Letters (MLitt) degree from Balliol College, University of Oxford.

== Career ==
During his early career, Anderson taught at Fettes College in Edinburgh and at Gordonstoun where he taught Prince Charles and directed him as Macbeth in the school play. He moved back to Fettes (1966–1970) and then to be headmaster at Abingdon School (1970–1975), Shrewsbury School (1975–1980) and Eton College (1980–1994) and he was rector of Lincoln College, Oxford (1994–2000), when its undergraduate students included Rishi Sunak. He was chairman of the Heritage Lottery Fund (1998–2001) and provost of Eton College (2000–2009).

At Fettes, he was Prime Minister Tony Blair's housemaster. Blair subsequently named Anderson in a 1997 advertising campaign run by the Teacher Training Agency, entitled "No one forgets a good teacher". He was Headmaster of Eton while David Cameron and Boris Johnson were there, as well as Rory Stewart, the Olympic oarsman Matthew Pinsent and the actors Dominic West and Damian Lewis. He was a supporter of the direct grant system.

The Clarendon Press published Anderson's edition of The Journal of Sir Walter Scott in 1972 and he became a trustee of Scott's Abbotsford during its refurbishment. He was elected a fellow of the Royal Society of Edinburgh in 1985 and, in 2002, he was appointed a Knight of the Order of the Thistle.

He retired as provost of Eton on 30 January 2009, and was succeeded by William Waldegrave.

His other positions included visitor at Harris Manchester College, Oxford; member of the visiting committee of Harvard University Memorial Church; trustee of the Royal Collection Trust; and chairman of Cumberland Lodge. He received honorary degrees from the University of St Andrews, Hull, Siena, Birmingham, the University of Aberdeen and Buckingham.

== Personal life ==
Anderson married Elizabeth ("Poppy"), née Mason. Their son is David Anderson (Lord Anderson of Ipswich KBE KC), and their daughter Kate is married to Will Gompertz.

He was an honorary Old Abingdonian and in 2018 accompanied Poppy, Kate and Will Gompertz, to open Beech Court at Abingdon School. Anderson died on 22 April 2020 at the age of 83, two days after his 60th wedding anniversary.

== Arms ==
Coat of arms of Eric Anderson
Motto Ad Meliora Symbolism The supporters (not pictured) are two wekas, in reference to Anderson's initials WEKA.

== See also ==
- List of Old Abingdonians

Academic offices
Preceded by Michael William McCrum	Head Master of Eton College; 1980–1994	Succeeded by John Lewis
Preceded by Maurice Shock	Rector of Lincoln College, Oxford; 1994–2000	Succeeded by Paul Langford
Preceded by Sir Antony Acland	Provost of Eton; 2000–2009	Succeeded by William Waldegrave
