= Holyport =

Coordinates: 51°29′20″N 0°42′36″W

- Village
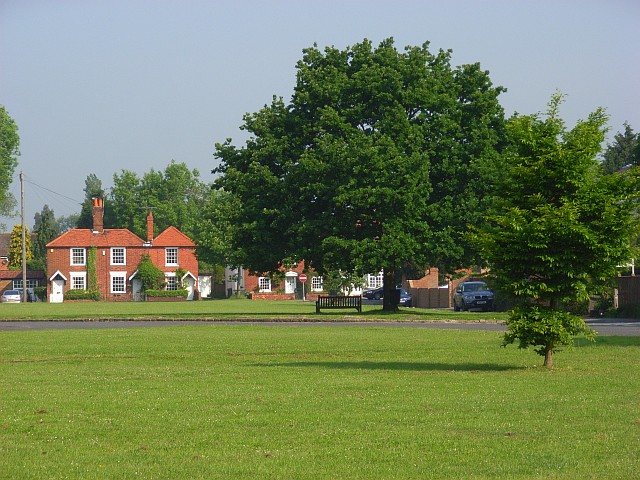
- Village green, Holyport

- Location within Berkshire
- OS grid reference: SU895775
- Unitary authority: Windsor and Maidenhead
- Ceremonial county: Berkshire
- Region: South East
- Country: England
- Sovereign state: United Kingdom
- Post town: MAIDENHEAD
- Postcode district: SL6
- Dialling code: 01628
- Police: Thames Valley
- Fire: Royal Berkshire
- Ambulance: South Central
- UK Parliament: Maidenhead

Holyport (pronounced Hollyport) is a suburban village in the civil parish of Bray (where at the 2011 Census the population was included), about 2 miles (3.2 km) south of Maidenhead town centre in the English county of Berkshire.

== Etymology ==
The name 'Holyport' originates from Old English horig + port meaning 'muddy market-town', although a local folk etymology holds that the village was a stopping-off point for pilgrims travelling from Canterbury to St David's. The first element had become 'Holy-' by the end of the 14th Century.

== Amenities ==
The village has a butcher, a newsagent, a grocery, a small café and a hairdresser as well as the post office and a doctor's surgery. Holyport has four public houses - The George, The Belgian Arms, The White Hart and The Jolly Gardener. Also in the village are Holyport Church of England Primary School, Holyport College and Holyport Cricket Club. An hourly bus service operated by Courtney Coaches connects the village to Windsor and Maidenhead. Holyport has a nature reserve on the edge of the village, Bray Pit.

There is also a village hall, Holyport Memorial Hall, tennis court, children's playground and playing field, all of which are owned and managed by the Holyport Community Trust, a Charitable Incorporated Organisation.

== Sport and leisure ==
The village's football team Holyport F.C. plays in the Hellenic Football League. Its cricket club plays in the Chilterns Cricket League on Saturdays and in friendlies against local clubs on Sundays.

Holyport has one of the world's few real tennis courts, at the Royal County of Berkshire Real Tennis Club, built in 1889.

The Holyport Village Fair is held on the village green on the first Saturday in June every year. The fair was established to raise funds to build the Memorial Hall and held at Foxley Manor on 21st July 1945. It draws large crowds from the surrounding area and it is understood 2020-21 are the only two years since the fair's inception that it did not take place - due to Covid.

== Notable residents ==
Holyport was the final residence of veteran BBC TV presenter Frank Bough until his death in 2020. Stirling Moss, the racing driver, lived in the village, and was a member of the Bray and Holyport Scout Group.

== In popular culture ==
Monty Python filmed a Maypole dance-related sketch on the green, the film Happy is the Bride was shot here and in Bray, and Joan Collins filmed an advertisement in Holyport. The movie One of Our Dinosaurs Is Missing was partly filmed in Holyport. A scene from the 1995 Mr. Bean episode, entitled 'Tee off Mr. Bean', was filmed on Holyport Green.
