= George Heath (priest) =

George Heath D.D. (baptised 3 December 1745 – 23 February 1822) was a Canon of Windsor from 1800 to 1822, and Head Master of Eton College from 1792 to 1802.

== Career ==
He was born the younger son of the scholar Benjamin Heath (1704–1766) and was educated at King's College, Cambridge. His elder brother Benjamin was Headmaster of Harrow School.

He was appointed:

- Head Master of Eton College, 1792–1802
- Rector of Monks Risborough
- Vicar of Sturminster Marshall, Dorset
- Vicar of Piddletown
- Vicar of East Beachworth, 1805–1814
- Fellow of the Royal Society, 1795–1822

He was appointed to the fourth stall in St George's Chapel, Windsor Castle in 1800, and held the stall until 1822.

== Notes ==
Academic offices
Preceded by Jonathan Davies	Head Master of Eton College; 1792–1802	Succeeded by Joseph Goodall
