= Benjamin Heath =

English classical scholar and bibliophile

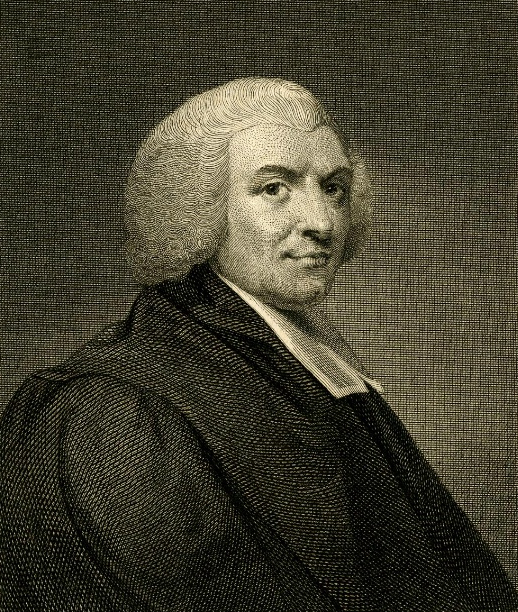
Benjamin Heath, 1738

Benjamin Heath, D.C.L.^{[a]} (10 April 1704 – 13 September 1766) was an English classical scholar and bibliophile.

== Life ==
He was born at Exeter, the eldest of three sons of Benjamin Heath, a wealthy merchant, and Elizabeth Kelland. He devoted himself mainly to travel and book collecting. He became town clerk of his native city in 1752, and held the office till his death.

== Works ==
In 1763 the ministry of Lord Bute imposed an excise tax of 4 shillings per hogshead on cider and perry on Britain's cider-producing agricultural counties. In Devon, Herefordshire, and Worcestershire protest meetings were common, and violent attacks occurred against the ministry. In 1763 soon after the enactment of the new tax, Heath published the pamphlet The Case of the County of Devon with respect to the consequences of the new Excise Duty on Cyder and Perry advocating the repeal of the cider tax in Devonshire, and his endeavours led to success three years later.

As a classical scholar Heath made his reputation by his critical and metrical notes on the Greek tragedians, which procured him an honorary DCL from Oxford (31 March 1752). He also left manuscript notes on Burmann's and Martyn's editions of Virgil, on Euripides, Catullus, Tibullus, and the greater part of Hesiod. In some of these he adopts the whimsical name Dexiades Ericius. His Revisal of Shakespear's Text (1765) was an answer to what he saw as the dogmatism of William Warburton.

The Essay towards a Demonstrative Proof of the Divine Existence, Unity and Attributes (1740) was intended to combat the opinions of Voltaire, Rousseau and Hume.

== Family ==
In 1732, Heath married Rose Marie (1718–1808), daughter of Geneva merchant John Michelet. Rose Marie bore him seven sons and six daughters. Two of their sons were Benjamin, headmaster of Harrow (1771–1785), and George, headmaster of Eton (1796–1802). His collection of rare classical works formed the nucleus of his son Benjamin's famous library (Bibliotheca Heathiana).^{[b]}

== Notes ==
a. Benjamin Heath, D.C.L., was the eldest son in lineage of Heaths where the eldest son was typically named "Benjamin Heath", per Drake's Heathiana. This can make it difficult to ascertain which Benjamin Heath is being referred to, leading to confusion and error. Drake's work assists in differentiating between the different Benjamin Heaths by use of initials after their names. So for example, the Benjamin Heath of this article is referred to on various pages as "Benjamin Heath, D.C.L." (e.g. pp. 5,9, portrait p.21). In contrast, his son is referred as "Benjamin Heath, D.D." (see p.16, and portrait of Benjamin Heath, D.D., p.17).

b. Regarding the two sons, there is a discrepancy between the entries in the Dictionary of National Biography (DNB), and the Encyclopædia Britannica. The Encyclopædia Britannica states that Heath's son Benjamin was headmaster at Harrow, while George was headmaster at Eton. However, the DNB (p. 340) states that Benjamin was headmaster at Eton. The discrepancy is resolved via Drake's Heathiana, which both texts use as a primary source, although the larger entry in DNB also cites other sources.
