= Claude Elliott (schoolmaster) =

English schoolmaster

Provost of Eton
- In office 1949–1965
- Preceded by: Henry Marten
- Succeeded by: Harold Caccia, Baron Caccia

Head Master of Eton College
- In office 1933–1949
- Preceded by: Cyril Alington
- Succeeded by: Robert Birley

Personal details
- Born: Claude Aurelius Elliott; 27 July 1888 British India
- Died: 21 November 1973 (aged 85) Gatesgarth, Buttermere, England
- Spouse: Gillian Bloxam
- Children: Nicholas Elliott

Sir Claude Aurelius Elliott OBE (27 July 1888 – 21 November 1973) was an English schoolmaster who became head master of Eton College at Windsor in Berkshire, and was later provost at the same school. An element of this later appointment is said to have been to keep an eye on his successor Robert Birley.

== Early life ==
Elliott was born in India, the only child of Sir Charles Alfred Elliott (1835–1911), the Lieutenant Governor of Bengal, and his second wife, Alice Louisa. Sir Charles had three sons and a daughter from a previous marriage. From Rokeby School, Claude Elliott was elected a King's Scholar of Eton College in 1902. He had an undistinguished scholastic career at Eton, but on going up to Trinity College, Cambridge, he discovered a natural bent as an historian, taking his BA in 1909, and becoming a fellow of Jesus College, Cambridge in 1910, and a Tutor in 1914.

On 17 June 1913, he married Gillian (d. 1966), the daughter of Frederick Turner Bloxam, chief Chancery Registrar, with whom he had a son, Nicholas Elliott (1916–1994), who worked in Military Intelligence during and after the Second World War, and who was awarded the US Legion of Merit for his services to the Office of Strategic Services.

== First World War ==
As a boy, Elliott enjoyed mountaineering, which interest he practised in Britain, Switzerland, and France, hoping one day to climb the Caucasus and the Himalayas, but he was prevented from pursuing this by a fall in the Lake District in 1912, which broke his kneecap and damaged his hand. These injuries did not stop him climbing, but they prevented active service in the First World War. Instead, Elliott served in a Red Cross unit in Flanders in 1915, after which he spent the remainder of the War at the Admiralty, being appointed OBE in 1920 for his War service. After the War he returned to Jesus College, where he served on the university's Financial Board, the General Board, and the Council of Senate.

== Eton College ==
Elliott was head master of Eton College from 1933 to 1949. His had been an unlikely selection. For example, he was the first head master of Eton who was not in holy orders, and neither his preaching in chapel nor his teaching in school were as impressive as those of his charismatic predecessor, Cyril Alington. However, he was an effective headmaster who was respected by the school's governing body for his sound judgement and his administrative skill. He was known to his students as "The Emperor", because of his imposing presence and his coolness towards the majority of his pupils. Elliott made no significant change to the school, believing that the selection of good and effective teachers was the school's best way forward.

During World War II, some parents suggested that Eton should be moved to a location safe from the bombs of the enemy. If London's poor could not move from London, said Elliott, the Etonians would not move from Eton. Later, in 1940, two bombs did actually fall on Eton, only just missing a library full of studying boys, but this only made him more determined to stand firm. Elliott never did move the school.

In 1949, after sixteen years as head master, Elliott was appointed Eton College's provost, a post he held until 1965. During his fifteen years as provost he launched an appeal to rebuild and modernise the college. He was responsible for the replacement of the shattered glass in the chapel windows with designs by Evie Hone and John Piper. As provost it was said that he had done more for the fabric of the school than any of his predecessors for five centuries.

== Later years ==
On his retirement, Elliott continued mountaineering, living in Buttermere where he could see the mountains he loved so well. He was personally acquainted with all the famous climbers of his time. He made forty visits to the Alps, and numerous other expeditions in Wales, the Lake District and Skye. Had it not been for his earlier climbing injuries he would have taken part in the Everest expeditions of 1921–1924. Elliott was president of the Alpine Club from 1950 to 1952. in that capacity, he selected John Hunt to lead the successful 1953 Everest expedition.

Elliott was a successful oarsman, being a member of the Leander Club. He was knighted in 1958. He died at his home, Lower Gatesgarth, Buttermere, on 21 November 1973 aged 85.

Academic offices
Preceded by Cyril Alington	Head Master of Eton College; 1933–1949	Succeeded by Robert Birley
Preceded by Henry Marten	Provost of Eton; 1949–1965	Succeeded by Harold Caccia, Baron Caccia
