= Bray Pit =

Nature reserve in Berkshire, England

Coordinates: 51°30′01″N 0°41′52″W

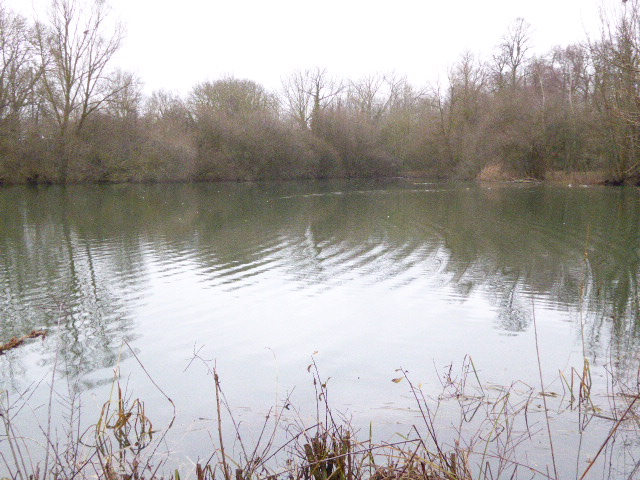

Bray Pit is a nature reserve on the edge of the village of Holyport in Berkshire, England. The nature reserve was under the management of the Berkshire, Buckinghamshire and Oxfordshire Wildlife Trust, but as of December 2019 is no longer listed on the Trust web site.

== Geography and site ==
The site is 2.0 hectares (4.9 acres) in size. Bray Pit consists of a small flooded gravel pit surrounded by a strip of woodland, a mature hedge and a wide grassy bank.

== Fauna ==
The site has the following fauna:

=== Invertebrates ===
- Anthocharis cardamines
- Bombus pascuorum
- Megachile centuncularis
- Osmia rufa
- Bombus lapidarius
- Bombus lucorum

=== Birds ===
- Sterna hirundo
- Fulica atra
- Podiceps cristatus
- Dendrocopus major
- Ardea cinerea
- Delichon urbica
- Alcedo atthis
- Gallinula chloropus
- Hirundo rustica
- Apus apus

== Flora ==
The site has the following flora:

- Centaurea nigra
- Leucanthemum vulgare
- Daucus carota
- Rhinanthus minor
