= Nicholas Carr (professor) =

English classical scholar and professor

Nicholas Carr (1524–1568) was an English classical scholar, regius professor of Greek at Cambridge in 1547, and a physician.

== Life ==
He was born at Newcastle, and at an early age was sent to Christ's College, Cambridge, where he studied under Cuthbert Scot. He subsequently migrated to Pembroke Hall, where his tutor was Nicholas Ridley, and proceeded B.A. in 1541, being soon afterwards elected a fellow there, and commencing M.A. in 1544.

On the foundation of Trinity College, Cambridge in 1546 he was nominated one of the original fellows, and the following year he was appointed regius professor of Greek. His lectures on Demosthenes, Plato, Sophocles, and other writers gained for him a reputation for scholarship. He composed a panegyric on Martin Bucer, but he subscribed the catholic articles in 1556, and two years later he was one of those who bore witness on oath against the heresies and doctrine of Bucer and Paul Fagius. He took the degree of M.D. in 1558, and for financial reasons began to practise at Cambridge as a physician, though for four years he continued to read the Greek lecture, at the end of which period he appointed Blithe of Trinity College to lecture for him. Carr died on 3 November 1568 at Cambridge.

== Works ==
He is best known for De Scriptorum Britannicorum Paucitate et Studiorum Impedimentis Oratio (printed 1576). edited by Thomas Hatcher.

His other works are;

- Epistola de morte Buceri ad Johannem Checum, London, 1561, reprinted in Bucer's Scripta Anglicana, Basle, 1677, and in Conrad Hubert's Historia vera de vita M. Buceri, Strasburg, 1562.
- Eusebii Pamphili de vita Constantini, Louvain, 1570. The fourth book only was translated by Carr; the others were translated by John Christopherson.
- Demosthenis Graecorum Oratorum Principis Olynthiacae orationes tres, et Philippicae quatuor, e Greco in Latinum conversae, London, 1571.
