= William Gardiner (botanist) =

Scottish umbrella maker, poet, and bryologist

William Gardiner junior
- Born: 13 July 1808
- Died: 21 June 1852 (aged 43)
- Scientific career
- Fields: Botany, bryology.

William Gardiner (1808-1852) the 'Dundee poetical botanist,' was a Scottish umbrella maker, poet, and bryologist.

== Life ==
William Gardiner was born in Dundee, at Overgate, on 13 July 1808. According to Lawley, his mother sold pottery, while his father, William senior, was a weaver, gardener, botanist and poet. William junior's grandfather, James Gardiner, was also a weaver. He received little education as a child, but learned how to read and write.

At the age of 10, William was apprenticed to an umbrella-maker. After completing his apprenticeship, he joined the business of a Mr George Robertson, another umbrella maker and hosier. Umbrella-making became his primary source of income until the 1840s when he became a full-time plant collector.

Wanting to continue his education, he took evening classes on botany. He regularly visited localities around Dundee, early in the mornings or in the evening at the end of his workday, to fuel his botanical passion.

William Gardiner junior died on the 21st of June 1852 at the age of 43 after suffering a fever.

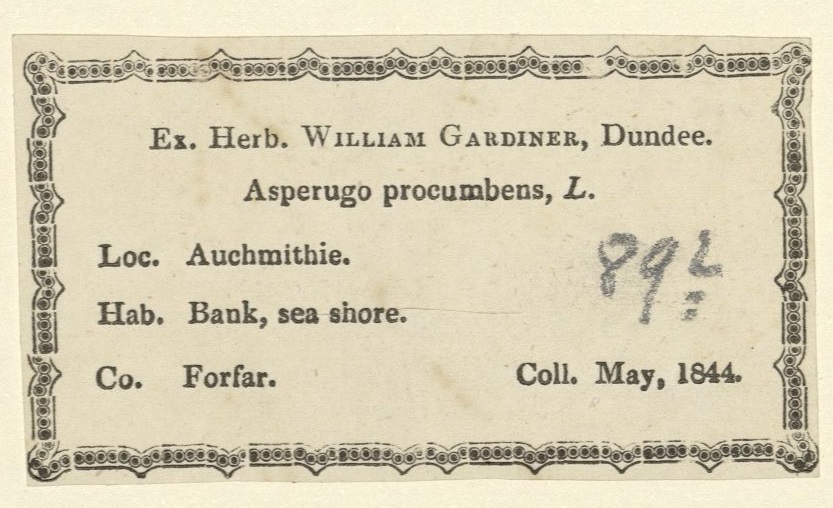
Herbarium label of William Gardiner of Dundee.

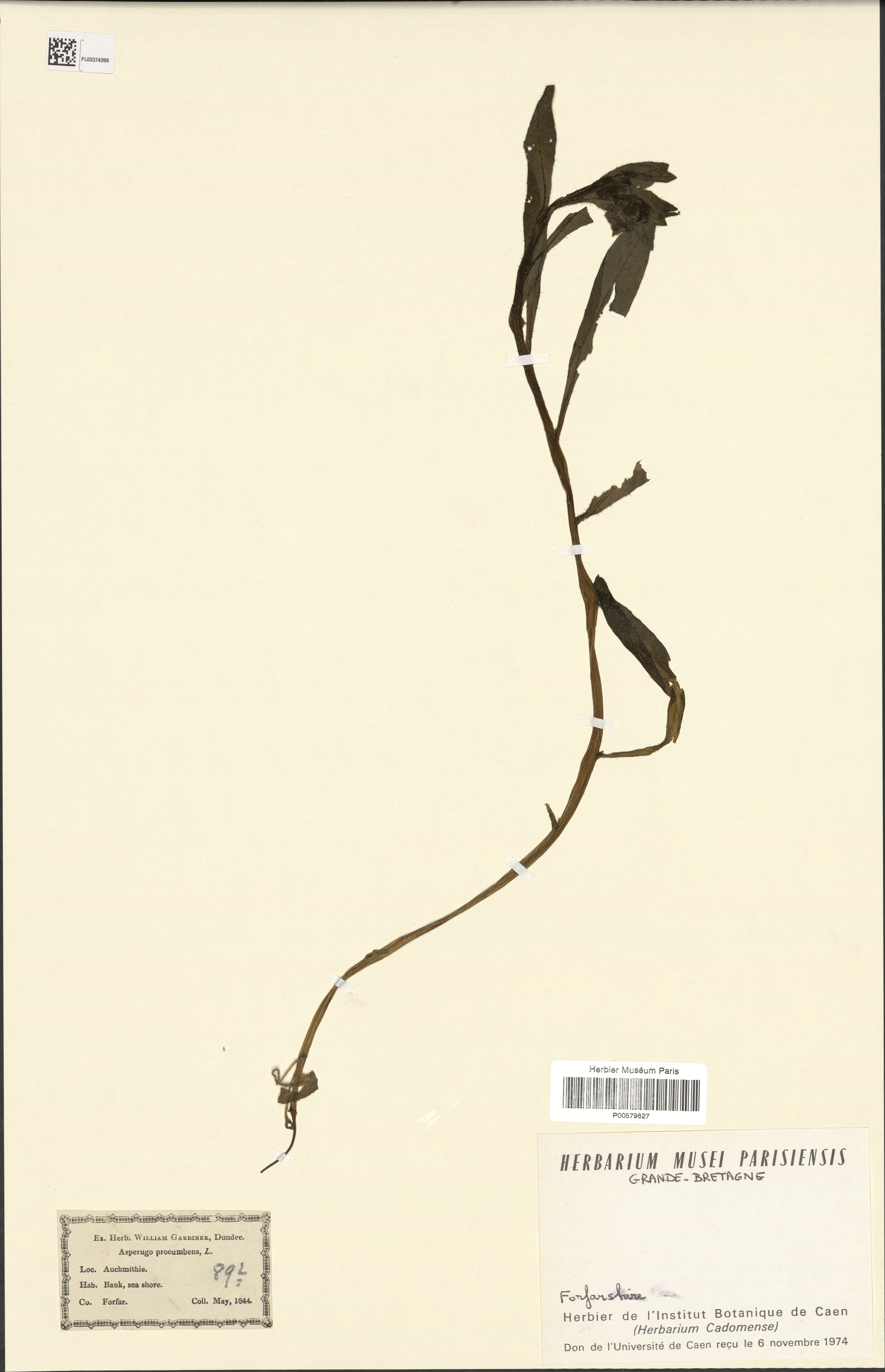
Herbarium specimen collected by William Gardiner of Dundee.

== Botany and bryology ==
The Botanical Society of Edinburgh employed Gardiner in 1838 to collect Alpine plants in Scotland. Around this time, the Botanical Society of London also employed him as a plant collector. In 1844 he left George Robertson's company and worked as a full-time collector, working for both institutions and individuals alike.

According to Leisure & Culture Dundee, Sir William Jackson Hooker offered Gardiner a botanical appointment, which he declined due to family commitments.

In the United Kingdom, Gardiner's specimens are cared for at the Natural History Museum in London, the Kew Herbarium, the Department of Biological Sciences, Dundee University, Hull University, the Bromfield Herbarium, and the Hancock Museum in Newcastle upon Tyne. Elsewhere in the world, The University and Jepson Herbaria at the University of California, Berkeley, the Muséum national d'Histoire naturelle and the National Herbarium of Victoria, Royal Botanic Gardens Victoria also hold his specimens. Under the title Twenty lessons on British Mosses; first steps to a knowledge of that beautiful tribe of plants ... illustrated with specimens Gardiner authored books which include mounted specimens for educational purposes. They resemble exsiccata booklets.

These exsiccatae-like books have attracted renewed academic attention in the 21st century, particularly by historians and artists who have focused on these works as material culture that mixed poetry, 'botanical science and mounted local plant specimens.'

== Standard author abbreviation ==
The standard author abbreviation Gardiner is used to indicate this person as the author when citing a botanical name.
