= George Goad =

George Goad (died 1671) was the master of Eton College.

== Life ==
Goad was a native of Windsor, Berkshire. He was the younger brother of Thomas Goad. After passing through Eton he was admitted into King's College, Cambridge, in 1620, proceeded M.A. in 1627, and returned to his old school as a master. In 1637 he was chosen senior university proctor. His college presented him in 1646 to the rectories of Horstead and Coltishall, Norfolk. On 18 October 1648 he was appointed fellow of Eton by the parliamentarians in the place of John Cleaver, who had been ejected.

He died on 10 or 16 October 1671. In his will, dated 20 August 1669, he mentions his property in Bray and Eton. He left three sons, George, Thomas, and Christopher, and a daughter, Jane. His wife, Jane, had died before him in 1657, at the age of thirty-four.

== Works ==
Goad continued the catalogues of the members of the foundation of Eton College from those of Thomas Hatcher and John Scott to 1646, of which Thomas Fuller and Anthony Wood made use, and which William Cole transcribed (cf. British Library Add MSS 5814-5817, 5955). He has Latin elegiacs 'in felicem Natalem illustrissimi Principis Ducis Eboracensis' at pp. 40–1 of Ducis Eboracensis Fasciæ.
