= Edward Elder (headmaster) =

British headmaster (1812–1858)

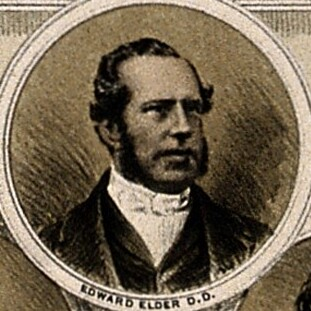
Edward Elder. Credit: Wellcome Collection

Edward Elder (1 October 1812 – 6 April 1858) was an English teacher, the headmaster of Charterhouse School from 1853.

== Life ==
Elder was the son of John Edward Elder of Barbados, born on 1 October 1812. At the age of twelve he was sent to Charterhouse, where he remained till 1830, when he gained an open scholarship at Balliol College, Oxford. There he took first class honours in literis humanioribus and won the Ellerton theological essay prize. He graduated B.A. 1834, M.A. 1836, D.D. 1853.

He held a tutorial appointment at Balliol till 1839, when he became headmaster of Durham Cathedral Grammar School. Elder was a successful head, and when in 1853 Augustus Page Saunders became Dean of Peterborough and he was appointed headmaster of Charterhouse, many of the Durham boys, among them Henry Nettleship, migrated to London with him. At Charterhouse he was intermittently ill and absent from the school; and suffered a breakdown.

On 6 April 1858 he died. A tablet to his memory was placed in Charterhouse Chapel, facing the founder's tomb. Elder contributed articles to William Smith's Dictionary of Greek and Roman Biography and Mythology.
