= Nicholas Grey =

English scholar and schoolmaster

Nicholas Grey (c. 1590–1660), was an English scholar and schoolmaster. He was headmaster of Charterhouse from 1614 until 1624, and afterwards of Eton College, from which he was ousted during the English Civil War. He was later headmaster of Merchant Taylors' School and Tonbridge School.

== Biography ==
Grey was born in London about 1590. He was a king's scholar at Westminster School, and proceeded in 1606 to Christ Church, Oxford. He graduated B.A. on 21 June 1610, and M.A. on 10 June 1613. In 1614 he was incorporated M.A. at Cambridge, and on 3 December of that year became headmaster of Charterhouse. On forfeiting the mastership of the Charterhouse by his marriage, he became rector of Castle Camps, Cambridgeshire. On 29 January 1624-5 he was elected headmaster of Merchant Taylors' School, and continued there until midsummer 1632, when he was appointed headmaster of Eton College and fellow of Eton. During the civil war he was ejected from his rectory and fellowship, and was reduced to great distress. He obtained eventually the headmastership of Tonbridge School, Kent, and published for the use of his scholars Parabolæ Evangelicæ Latino redditæ carmine paraphrastico varii generis (8vo, London, no date). On the return of Charles II he was restored to his rectory and fellowship (12 July 1660), but died very poor, and was buried in the chapel at Eton on 5 October 1660.

Grey wrote some additions to John Rider's Dictionary, and added testimonies from scripture to Grotius's Baptizatorum Puerorum Institutio, 8vo, London, 1655; earlier editions had appeared in 1647 and 1650.
