= London Academy of Excellence =

Coordinates: 51.53938386858997°N 0.0009330485125105662°W

London Academy of Excellence Stratford
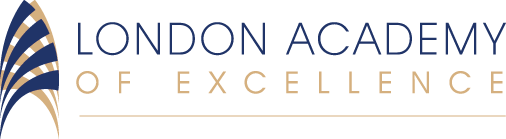

Location
- Broadway House 322 Stratford High Street; Stratford, E15 1AJ; England

Information
- Type: Free School
- Motto: The academic sixth form for independent thinkers
- Established: 2012
- Local authority: Newham
- Department for Education URN: 138403 Tables
- Ofsted: Reports
- Chair of Governors: Tony Little (headmaster)
- Headteacher: Eve Rahman
- Gender: Coeducational
- Age: 16 to 19
- Enrolment: As of 2025, 476
- Capacity: As of 2025, 800
- Houses: Eton; Caterham; Highgate; Brighton; University College School; Forest
- Website: http://www.lae.ac.uk/

The London Academy of Excellence, Stratford (LAE) is a selective free school sixth form school located in the Stratford area of the London Borough of Newham, England. It has approximately 500 pupils and 32 teachers.

== Background ==
The school first opened in 2012 in collaboration with seven independent schools - Brighton College, Caterham School, Eton College, City of London School, Forest School, Highgate School and University College School, six of which continue to support the school as 'partner schools'. Its relationship with Eton College has led to the school being dubbed 'the Eton of the East End' by the national media.

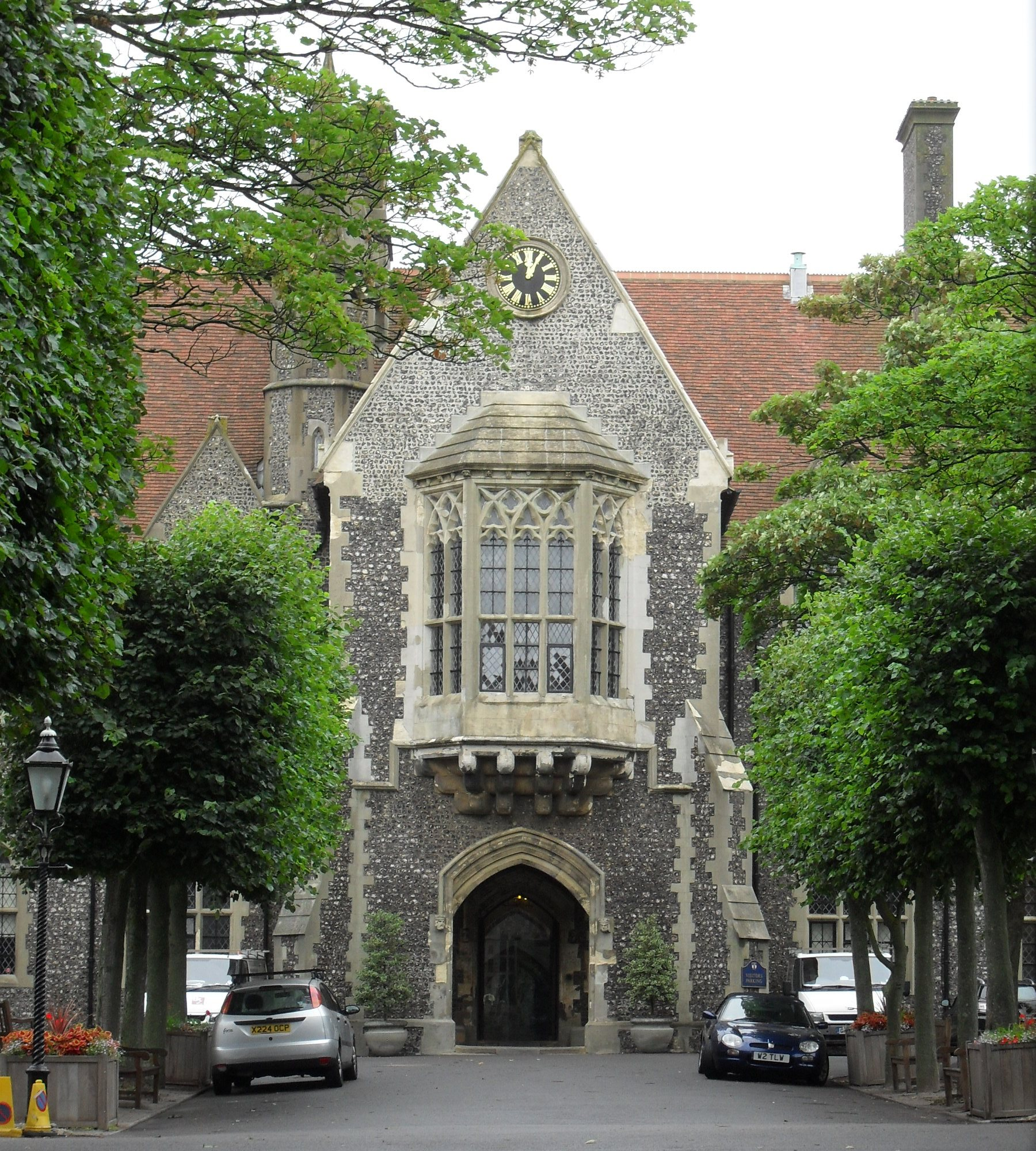
Brighton College

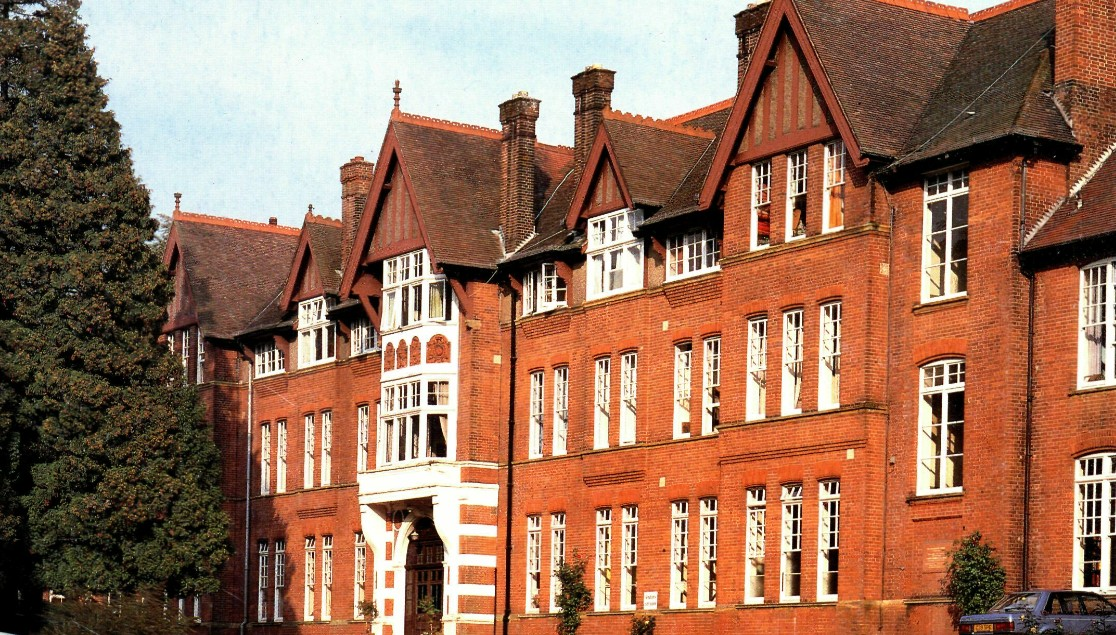
Caterham

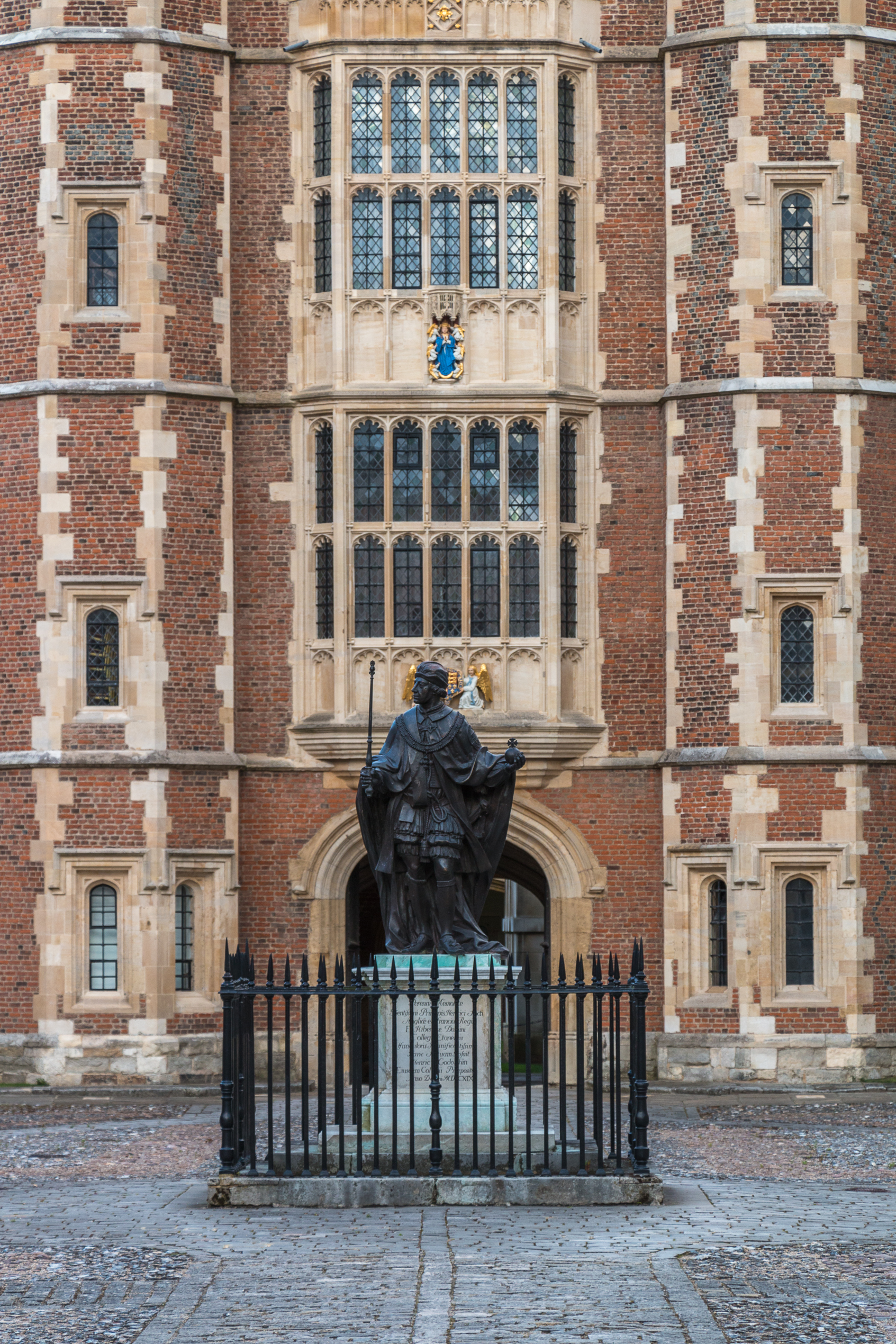
Eton

LAE is a flagship of the government's academies programme. It was visited by Michael Gove in February 2014, who called it a "superb new free school". As well as state funding, the school raises funds from corporate and other philanthropic donors in order to offer sports and recreation activities, clubs, societies, a lecture programme and an outreach program to complement academic studies.

The school offers an academic A-Level curriculum designed to facilitate student's entry on to competitive degree courses at leading universities. Conditional offers of places are made on the basis of student's predicted GCSE results. In 2025, the school received over 7,000 initial applications for 250 available places. The LAE will increase the number of places available following relocation to its new buildings in 2026.

In 2015, the Sunday Times awarded the school with the title of 'The Sunday Times Sixth-form College of The Year'. It was the first free school to be named the best sixth form in the country".

In June 2022 the school was shortlisted in the top 10 schools for the World's Best School Prize in the category of 'Supporting Healthy Living' in recognition of the wellbeing offer in the school. The school is also the only state-funded school in the world so far admitted to the World Leading Schools Association.

== Results ==
The school was inspected in October 2017 and was awarded “outstanding” in all areas. The school's "outstanding" judgement was confirmed by Ofsted in March 2024.

In 2024, the LAE achieved record results with 73% of all A-Levels grades A*/A, and 96% A*-B. The LAE also ranked among the top five state schools in England for A level outcomes.

== Controversies ==
In 2022 a small group of LAE alumni working with Cage UK, MEND and Azad Ali listed a number of allegations against the school, that the school released a statement refuting.

In March 2022 the school appointed an external investigator to investigate the complaint, concluding that there is no evidence that the LAE or any of its staff, either past or serving, discriminated against Muslim students and finds that the School’s Governing Board acted appropriately and transparently in its decision to discontinue multi-faith facilities at LAE in September 2015. Independent from the campaign the school has facilitated the use of on-site space for students wishing to pray.
