= Holyport College =

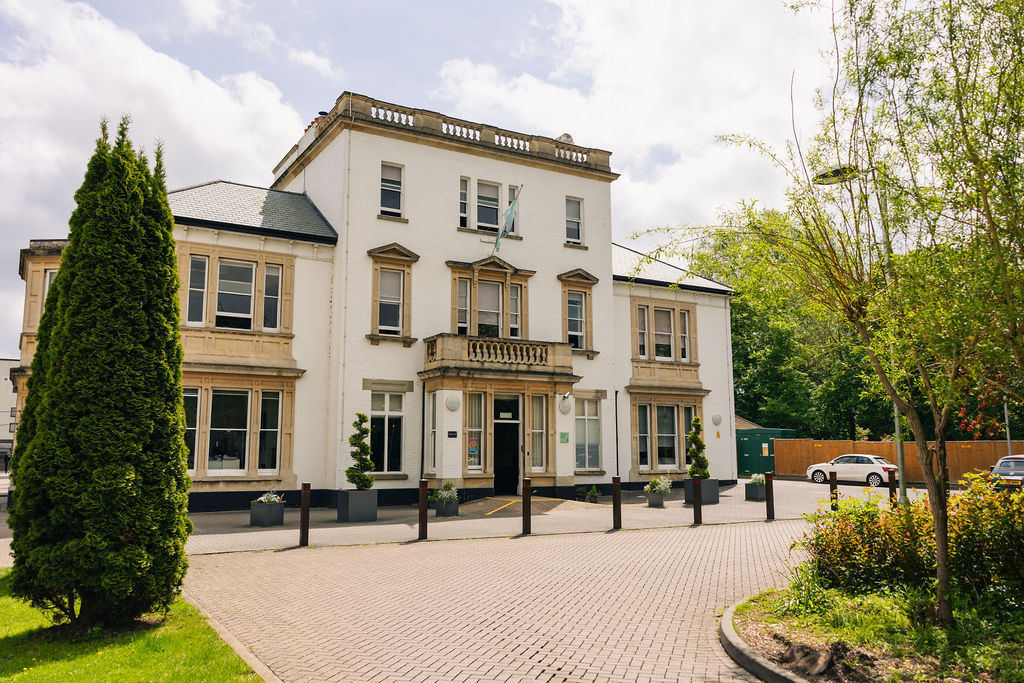

Location
- Ascot Road; Holyport, Berkshire, SL6 3LE; England; 34°33′19″N 69°12′27″E

Information
- Type: Boarding school and Free school
- Established: 2014
- Local authority: Windsor and Maidenhead
- Department for Education URN: 139971 Tables
- Ofsted: Reports
- Head: Alastair Ingall
- Gender: Mixed
- Age: 11 to 19
- Enrolment: 600
- Capacity: 600
- Houses: Brunel, Turing, Johnson and Fawcett
- Website: www.holyportcollege.org.uk

Holyport College is a coeducational state boarding and day secondary school, located in Holyport, Berkshire, England. It opened in 2014 and caters for students aged 11–18 years. It is sponsored by Eton College, which also shares some of its sporting facilities with Holyport College. 40% of its students are boarders.

Holyport College has two pygmy goats named Toni and Simon after the two headmasters of Eton College.

== History ==
Holyport College was founded in 2014, as the UK's first state boarding school to be opened under the Free Schools Programme.

== Head ==
Alastair Ingall started as Headteacher of Holyport College in September 2024.

== Boarding ==
Boarding accommodation is located on the upper floors of the two teaching blocks. There are four boarding houses, located in two separate buildings. The boys’ accommodation is separate to the girls. There are separate wings for year groups and the second floor of each building is used for the sixth formers. There are currently over 200 boarders on roll.

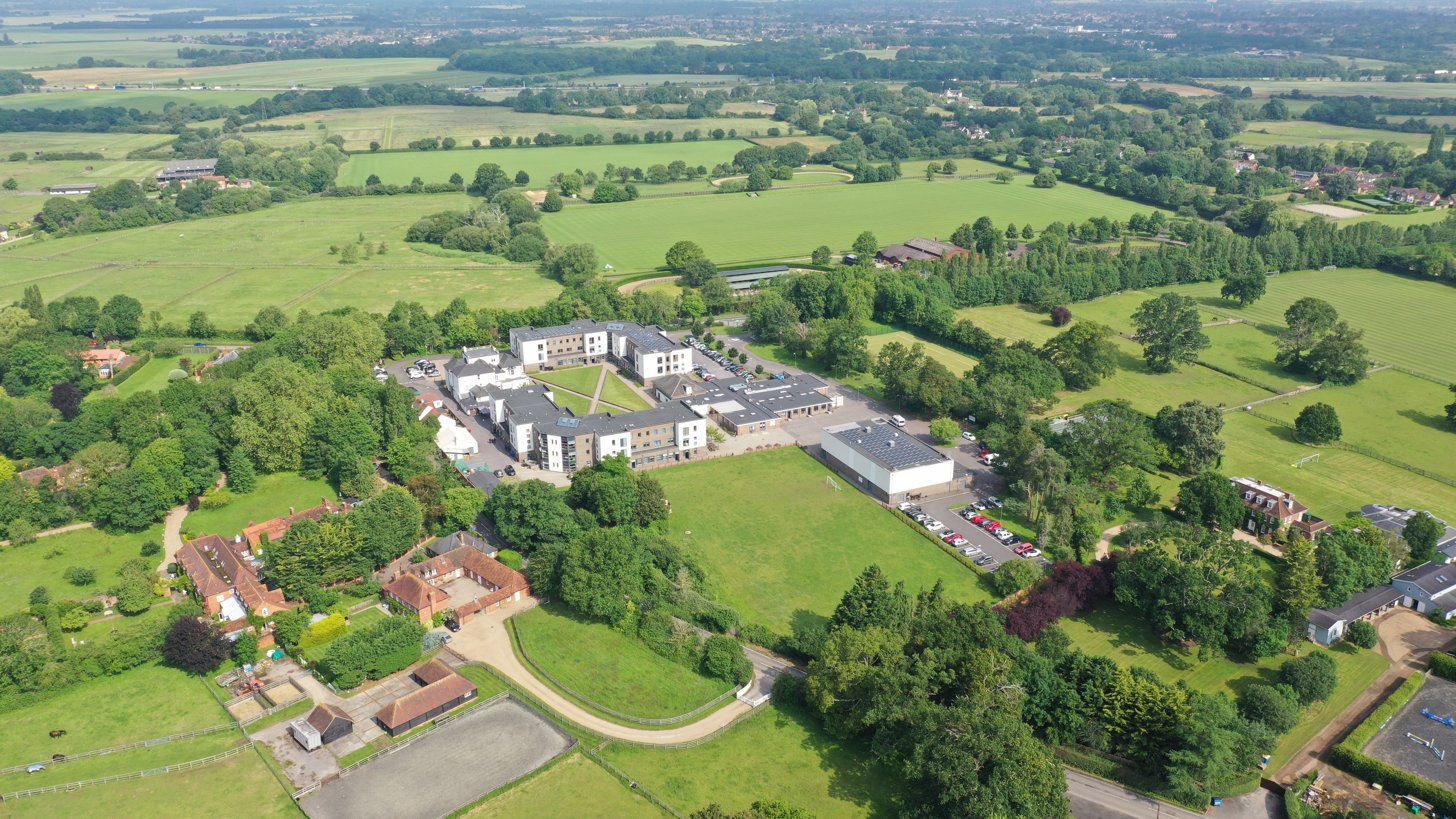
Holyport College

== Ofsted Reports ==
The overall outcome of the inspection on 23 May 2023 was: GOOD

- Quality of education: Good
- Behaviour and attitudes: Good
- Personal development: Outstanding
- Leadership and management: Outstanding
- Sixth form provision: Outstanding
- Previous inspection grade: Outstanding
