= Cambridge Pre-U =

Educational qualification

The Cambridge Pre-U was a school leaving qualification from Cambridge Assessment International Education that was an alternative to the current A-Level qualification. It was offered between 2008 and 2023 and was principally aimed at students aged 16–19, and has recognition for university entrance.

The Cambridge Pre-U was launched in 2008 by Cambridge International Examinations in order to create a qualification which would offer additional depth in subjects beyond the standard A-Level syllabus. A number of independent, grammar and comprehensive schools and sixth-form colleges replaced A-Levels with Cambridge Pre-Us in some subjects. Over 120 schools offered Cambridge Pre-U in at least one subject and with some schools switching completely to offering solely the Pre-U.

The Cambridge Pre-U was linear, like the UK A level (the international A-level variant delivered by Cambridge International Examinations is also linear), and does not have any compulsory principal subjects as the International Baccalaureate does: students had a free choice of three such "Principal Subjects" out of 27. Additional subjects were also permitted to be taken, though not incorporated into the Diploma. There were also 'short courses', consisting of one year's study, available in Modern Foreign Languages, Maths and Further Maths. Students who completed an "Independent Research Project" and a "Global Perspectives" portfolio in addition to the three "Principal Subjects" were eligible for the award of the Cambridge Pre-U Diploma.

All the 'Ivy League' universities in the USA accepted the Cambridge Pre-U for the purposes of university entrance.

Cambridge Assessment International Education withdrew the Cambridge Pre-U qualification for new entries, with the last examination being held in June 2023, though a resit was available in June 2024. The qualification was withdrawn as a review from Cambridge International found that the qualification was too similar to the reformed A-Levels.

== Principal Subjects ==
The Guide for Schools listed:

- English: Literature in English
- Humanities: Classical Heritage, Geography, Global Perspectives, History, Philosophy and Theology
- Languages: Classical Greek, French, German, Italian, Latin, Mandarin Chinese, Russian, Spanish
- Mathematics: Mathematics, Further Mathematics
- Science: Biology, Chemistry, Physics
- Social Sciences: Business and Management, Comparative Government and Politics, Economics, Psychology
- The Arts: Art and Design, Art History, Drama and Theatre, Music

== Grading ==
In the Pre-U, each Principal Subject was graded on a three-band, nine-grade scale:

Band	Grade	A-level equivalence
Distinction	D1	Higher range of A* grade
Distinction	D2	A*
Distinction	D3	A*/A
Merit	M1	A/B
Merit	M2	B
Merit	M3	B/C
Pass	P1	C
Pass	P2	D
Pass	P3	E

The full Pre-U Diploma was graded on the aggregate of the three Principal Subjects, the Independent Research Project, and the Global Perspectives portfolio. The two together (GPR) could also be taken as a separate subject. The Independent Research Project and the Global Perspectives portfolio were each worth exactly half of a Principal Subject; thus, their aggregate formed the equivalent of another Principal Subject. The Pre-U Diploma was graded out of 96 overall; each Principal Subject was graded out of 24, and both Global Perspectives and the Independent Research Report were graded out of 12 each. Some schools offered a mix of A-levels and Pre-U Principal Subjects. With such a mix it is still possible to earn a Pre-U Diploma.

Contribution of each component to the Diploma score
Band	Grade	Principal Subjects	Independent Research Report	Global Perspectives
Distinction	D1	24	12	12
Distinction	D2	22	11	11
Distinction	D3	20	10	10
Merit	M1	18	9	9
Merit	M2	16	8	8
Merit	M3	14	7	7
Pass	P1	12	6	6
Pass	P2	10	5	5
Pass	P3	8	4	4

== UCAS tariff ==
The Universities and Colleges Admission Service (UCAS) awarded a tariff score for Cambridge Pre-U which reflected the HE view of the qualification as very good preparation for university study. Using UCAS tariff scores as a benchmark, universities were able to compare Cambridge Pre-U and A-Level grades.

The Cambridge Pre-U grading scale is divided into three bands: Distinction, Merit and Pass, each sub-divided into three grades (Distinction 1, Distinction 2, Distinction 3 and so on). The top grades, Distinction 1 and Distinction 2, were awarded 56 UCAS points, the same as an A* at A-level. Distinction 3 is aligned to a grade A at A-level. The lowest pass grade, Pass 3, is aligned to the border between E and U at A-Level.

UCAS awards Principal Subjects 52 points for Distinction 3 and that a Pass 3 is worth 20 points. The tariff for exceptional candidates who achieve a Distinction 1 pass were to have been announced after the first Cambridge Pre-U examination entries were assessed; both D1 and D2 are currently awarded 56 tariff points.

UCAS has given the Global Perspectives and Research component the same tariff as a single Principal Subject. The 'short course' subjects have a separate tariff score too, for example: 22 for a Distinction 1; 20 for a Distinction 2 or 3; 6 for a Pass 3.
