= De la Bédoyère =

De la Bédoyère is a surname of French origin. People with that name include:

- Charles de la Bédoyère (1786–1815), French General during the reign of Emperor Napoleon I
- Guy de la Bédoyère (born 1957), British historian
- Michael de la Bédoyère (1900–1973), English author, editor and journalist
