= William Day (bishop) =

English Anglican Bishop (1529–1596)

The Right Reverend William Day
- Bishop of Winchester
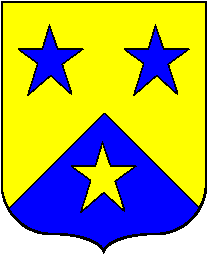
- Diocese: Diocese of Winchester
- Elected: 3 November 1595
- Term ended: 20 September 1596
- Predecessor: William Wickham
- Successor: Thomas Bilson
- Other posts: Dean of Windsor (1572–1595); Provost of Eton College (1561–1595); Archdeacon of Nottingham (1560–1565)

Orders
- Ordination: 31 March 1560 by Richard Davies on behalf of Edmund Grindal
- Consecration: 25 January 1596 by John Whitgift

Personal details
- Born: 1529 Shropshire, England
- Died: 20 September 1596 (aged 66–67)
- Denomination: Anglican
- Spouse: Elizabeth Barlow
- Children: 6
- Education: Eton College; King's College, Cambridge

William Day (1529 – 20 September 1596) was Bishop of Winchester (1595–96), Dean of Windsor (1572–95), and Provost of Eton College (1561–95).

== Early life ==
William Day was born in Shropshire to Richard Day & Elizabeth Osborne. He was educated at Eton College and King's College, Cambridge, where he became a scholar in 1545 and a fellow in 1548, before graduating BA in 1550 and MA in 1553.

== Early career (1559–1572) ==
He became Archdeacon of Nottingham in 1561 and a canon of St George's Chapel, Windsor in 1565, resigning from his position in Nottingham later that year.

He became a fellow of Eton College in 1560, and in 1561, after Richard Bruerne resigned, he was elected to be Provost, a position he held until 1595.

== Dean of Windsor (1572–1595) ==
He was appointed Dean of the Chapel Royal (although since George Carew had not actually resigned this position, he was unable to take up this role) and Dean of Windsor in 1572. He remained Dean of Windsor for 24 years.

Day was recommended to be a bishop by numerous figures, including Matthew Parker, William Cecil, John Aylmer, and John Whitgift, from as early as 1568. However, he did not become a bishop until 1596.

== Bishop of Winchester (1596) ==
He was elected unchallenged as Bishop of Winchester on 3 November 1595, and was consecrated as a bishop on 25 January 1596. He died later that year, on 20 September.

== Personal life ==
George Day, Bishop of Chichester, was his elder brother. William had converted to Protestantism, but George remained Catholic, which caused a rift between the two brothers. His brother died in 1556.

He married Elizabeth Barlow (daughter of William Barlow, who was like Day's brother Bishop of Chichester) in around 1565.

William Day was probably the grandfather of Francis Day of Madras, through his son William Day of Bray.

Church of England titles
Preceded by Robert Pursglove	Archdeacon of Nottingham; 1560–1565	Succeeded by John Louth
Preceded by George Carew	Dean of Windsor; 1572–1595	Succeeded by Robert Bennet
Preceded by William Wickham	Bishop of Winchester; 1595–1596	Succeeded by Thomas Bilson
Academic offices
Preceded by Richard Bruerne; William Bill	Provost of Eton; 1561–1595	Succeeded by Henry Savile
