= Marbeck =

Marbeck is a surname. Notable people with the surname include:

- John Marbeck (1510–1585), English theologian and musician
- Roger Marbeck (1536–1605), English scholar, son of John
- Sarah Marbeck (born c. 1975), Malaysian-born Australian model

== See also ==
- Marbeck (Itter), river in Germany
