= Southwark Cathedral =

Coordinates: 51°30′22″N 0°5′23″W

- Cathedral and Collegiate Church of St Saviour and St Mary Overie
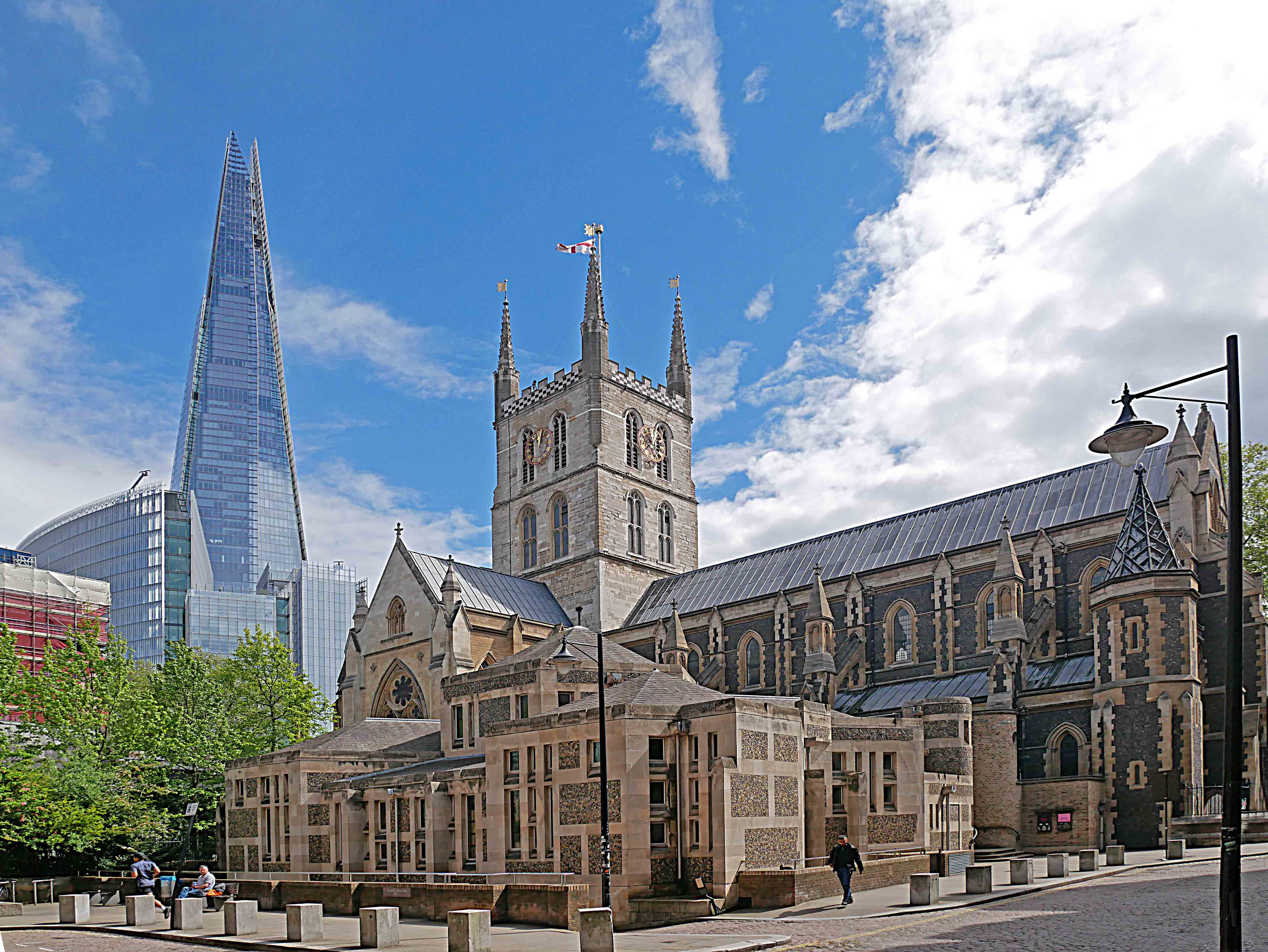

- Shown within Central London
- OS grid reference: TQ 32680 80311
- Location: Southwark; London, SE1
- Country: England
- Denomination: Church of England
- Previous denomination: Roman Catholic
- Churchmanship: Liberal Catholic
- Website: cathedral.southwark.anglican.org

Architecture
- Heritage designation: Grade I listed building
- Designated: 2 March 1950
- Style: Gothic, Gothic Revival
- Years built: 1106–1897

Administration
- Province: Canterbury
- Diocese: Southwark

Clergy
- Bishop: Christopher Chessun
- Dean: Mark Oakley

Southwark Cathedral (/ˈsʌðərk/ SUDH-ərk), formally the Cathedral and Collegiate Church of St Saviour and St Mary Overie, is a Church of England cathedral in Southwark, London, near the south bank of the River Thames and close to London Bridge. It is the mother church of the Diocese of Southwark. It has been a place of Christian worship for more than 1,000 years, but the church was not raised to cathedral status until the creation of the diocese of Southwark in 1905.

Between 1106 and 1538, it was the church of an Augustinian priory, Southwark Priory, dedicated in honour of the Virgin Mary (St Mary – over the river, 'overie'). Following the dissolution of the monasteries, it became a parish church, with a dedication to the Holy Saviour (St Saviour). The church was in the diocese of Winchester until 1877, when the parish of St Saviour's, along with other South London parishes, was transferred to the Diocese of Rochester. The present building retains the basic form of the Gothic structure built between 1220 and 1420, although the nave is a late 19th-century reconstruction.

== History ==
=== Legendary origins ===
The 16th-century London historian John Stow recorded an account of the origins of the Southwark Priory of St Mary that he had heard from Bartholomew Linsted, who had been the last prior when the priory was dissolved. Linsted claimed it had been founded as a nunnery "long before the [Norman] Conquest" by a maiden named Mary, on the profits of a ferry across the Thames she had inherited from her parents. Later it was converted into a college of priests by "Swithen, a noble lady". Finally in 1106 it was refounded as an Augustinian priory.

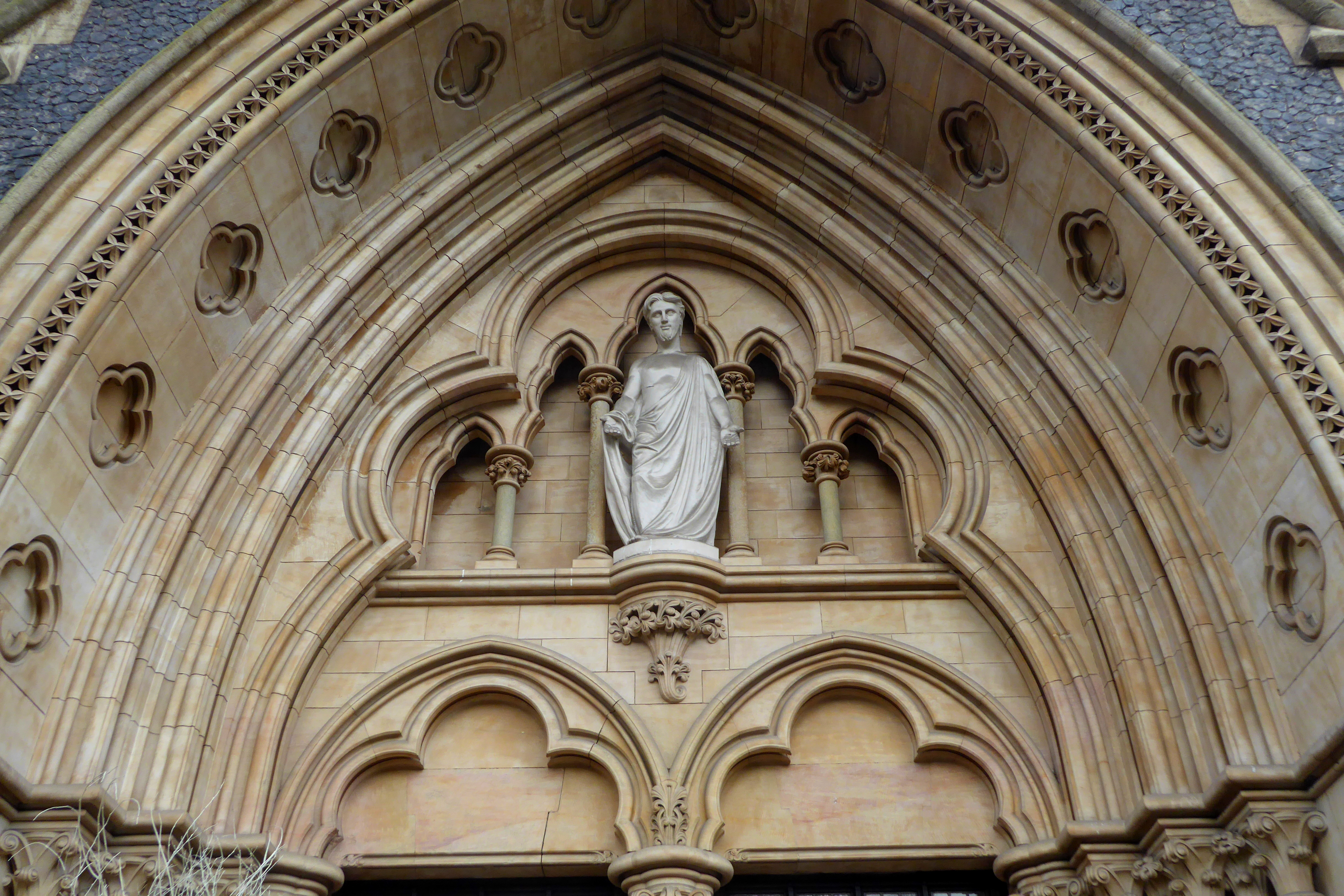
Detail on the south porch

The tale of the ferryman's daughter Mary and her benefactions became very popular, but later historians tried to rationalise Linsted's story. Thus the author of an 1862 guidebook to the then St Saviour's Church suggested it was probable that the "noble lady" Swithen had in fact been a man – Swithun, Bishop of Winchester, from 852 or 853 until his death in 863.

In the 20th century this identification was accepted by Thomas P. Stevens, succentor and sacrist, and later honorary canon, of Southwark Cathedral, who wrote a number of guidebooks to the cathedral, and a history that was revised and reprinted many times. He went on to date the foundation of the supposed original nunnery to "about the year 606", although he provided no evidence to support the date. Although recent guidebooks are more circumspect, referring only to "a tradition", an information panel at the east end of the cathedral still claims that there had been "A convent founded in 606 AD" and "A monastery established by St Swithun in the 9th century".

It is unlikely that this minster pre-dated the conversion of Wessex in the mid-7th century, or the foundation of the "burh" c. 886. There is no proof for suggestions that a convent was founded on the site in 606 nor for the claim that a monastery was founded there by St Swithun in the 9th century.

=== Saxon and Norman ===
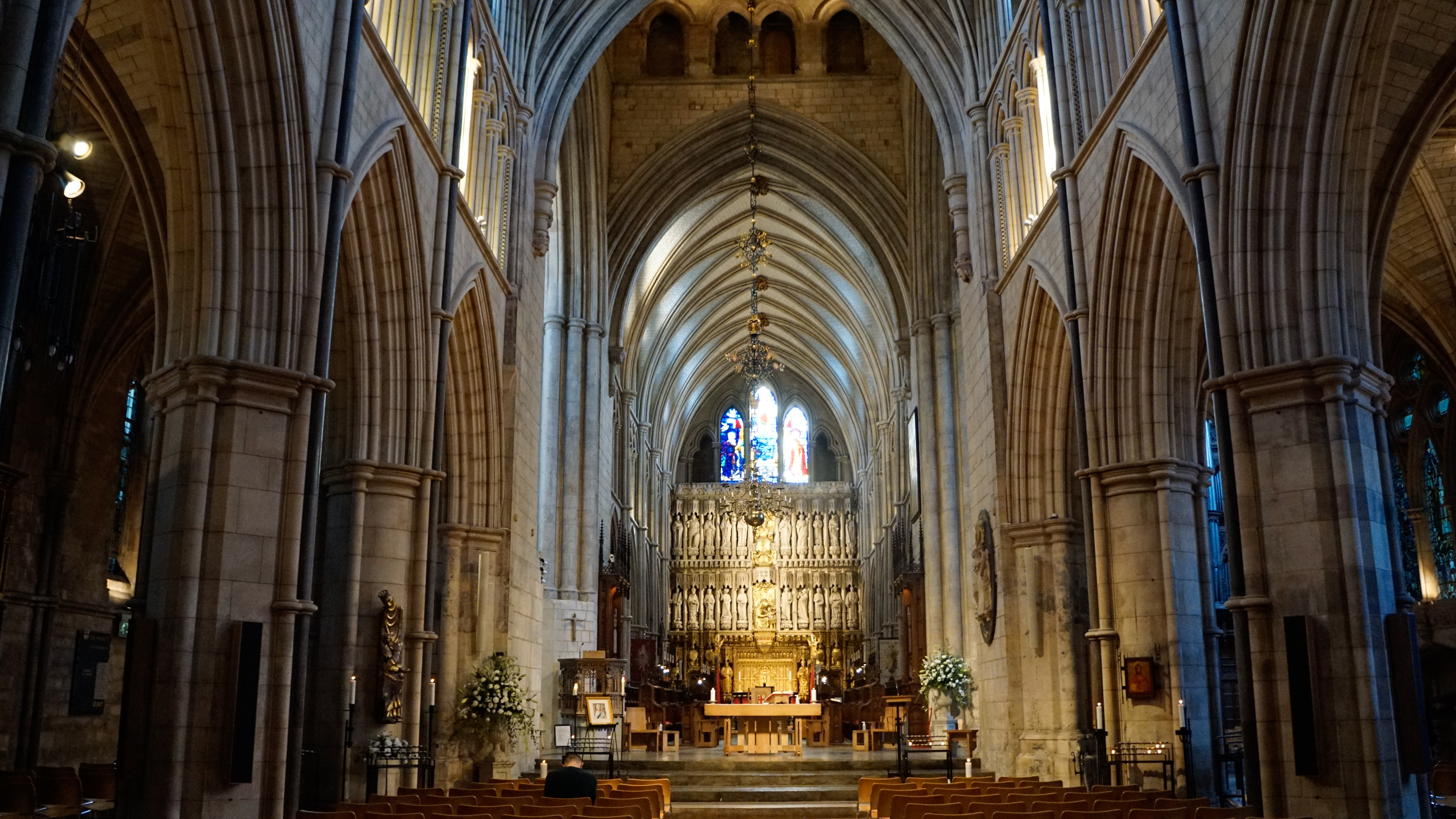
The nave of Southwark Cathedral

The earliest reference to the site was in the Domesday Book of 1086, when the "minster" of Southwark seems to have been under the control of William the Conqueror's half-brother, Bishop Odo of Bayeux.

The Old English minster was a collegiate church serving an area on the south side of the Thames. In 1106, during the reign of Henry I it became an Augustinian priory, under the patronage of the Bishops of Winchester, who established their London seat Winchester Palace immediately to the west in 1149. A remaining wall of the palace refectory, with a rose window, survives in Clink Street.

The Priory was dedicated to the Virgin Mother as 'St Mary' but had the additional soubriquet of "Overie" ("over the river") to distinguish it from the many churches in the City of London (on the opposite bank of the Thames) with the same name.

Some fragments of 12th-century fabric survive. The church in its present form, however, dates to between 1220 and 1420, making it the first Gothic church in London.

=== Gothic reconstruction ===
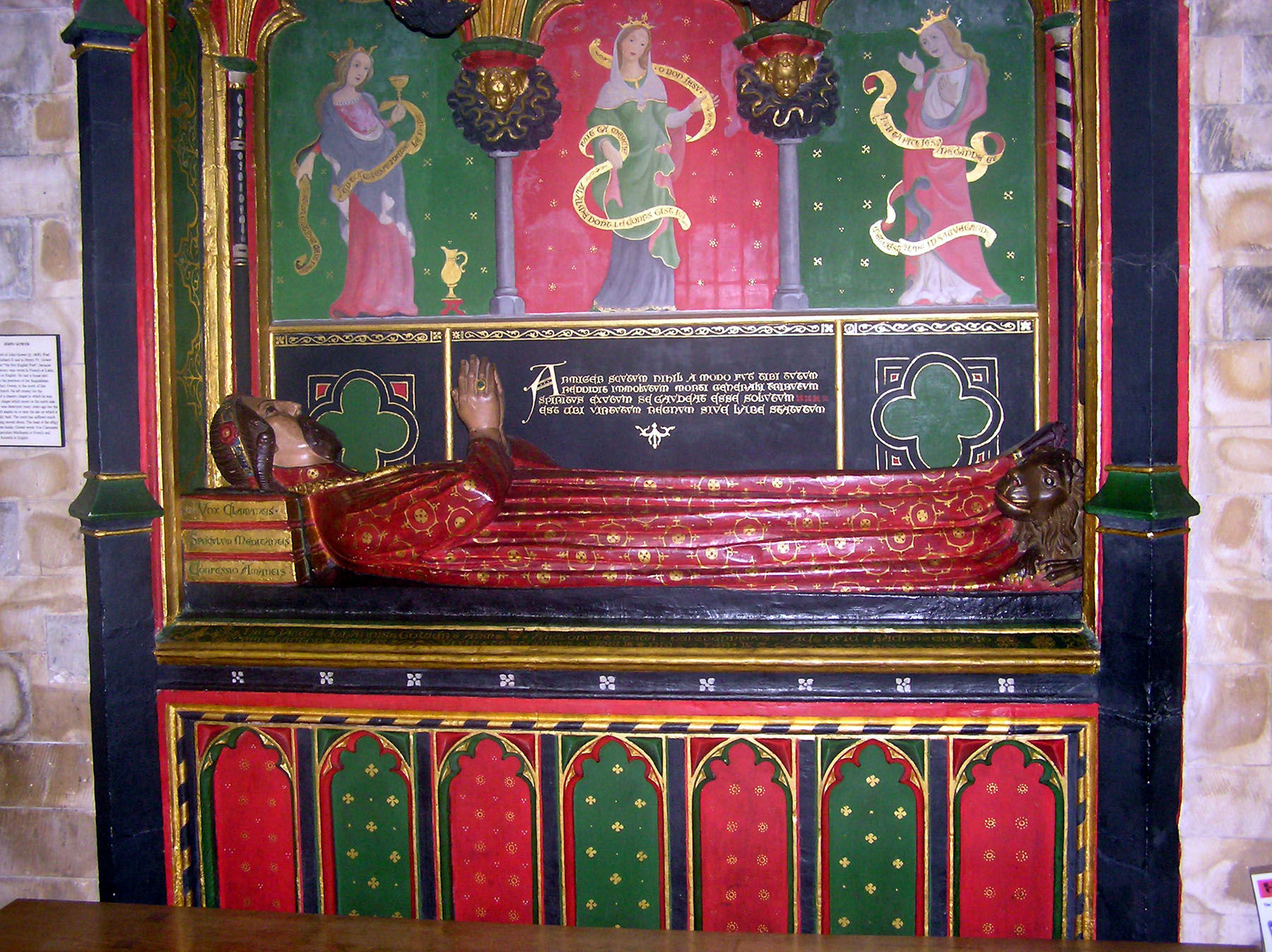
The 15th-century church monument to the poet John Gower in Southwark Cathedral. Unusually, the original polychrome painting of it has been kept renewed.

The church was severely damaged in the Great Fire of 1212. Rebuilding took place during the thirteenth century, although the exact dates are unknown. In its reconstructed state – the basic layout of which survives today – the church was cruciform in plan, with an aisled nave of six bays, a crossing tower, transepts, and a five-bay choir. Beyond the choir stood a lower retrochoir or Lady chapel, the form of which can also be interpreted as group of four chapels with separate gabled roofs, two opening from the choir, and two from each aisle.

There was a chapel dedicated to Mary Magdalen, for the use of the parishioners, in the angle between the south transept and the choir, and another chapel was later added to the east of the retrochoir. Much later, this become known as the "Bishop's chapel" as it was the burial place of 17th century bishop Lancelot Andrewes.

In the 1390s, the church was again damaged by fire, and in around 1420 the Bishop of Winchester, Henry Beaufort, assisted with the rebuilding of the south transept and the completion of the tower.

During the 15th century the parochial chapel was rebuilt, and the nave and north transept were given wooden vaults following the collapse of the stone ceiling in 1469. Some of the carved bosses from the vault (destroyed in the 19th century) are preserved in the cathedral.

The 14th-century poet John Gower lived in the priory precinct and is entombed in the church, with a splendid memorial, with polychrome panels. There is also a recumbent effigy of a knight in timber (rather than brass or stone) and it is suggested by the church that this dates from the 13th century. If so then this is one of the oldest such memorials and some credence can be given to the suggestion by its lack of heraldic emblems.

=== 16th and 17th centuries ===
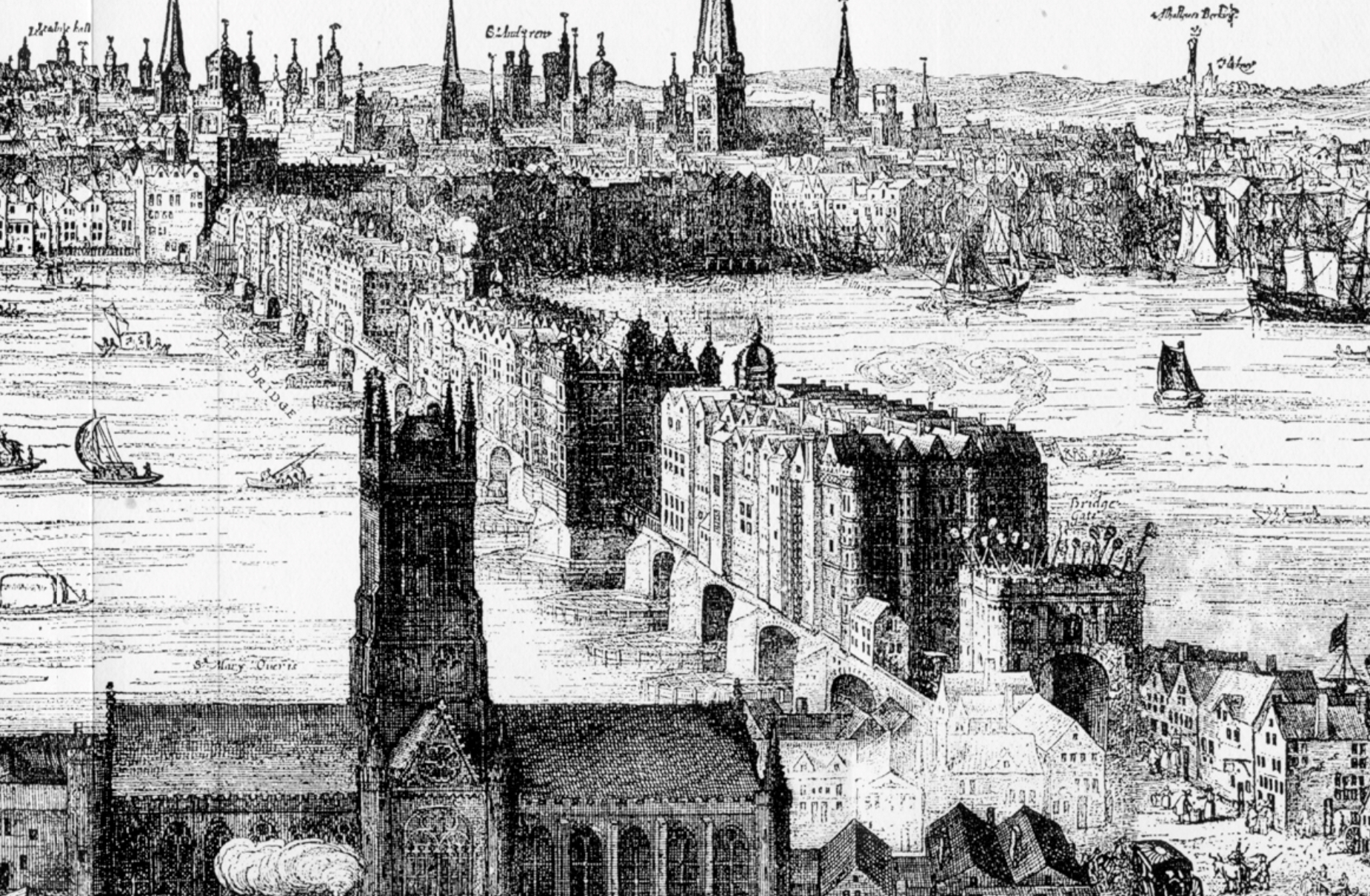
A 1616 etching by Claes Van Visscher, showing Old London Bridge with Southwark Priory or St Saviour (now the cathedral) in the foreground

In around 1520 the Bishop of Winchester, Richard Foxe, carried out a programme of improvement, installing a stone altar screen, a new west doorway with a window above and a new window in the east gable of the choir.

Along with all the other religious houses in England, the priory was dissolved by Henry VIII, being surrendered to the Crown in 1540. The receiver in charge of dissolving St Marie Overie was William Saunders. In that year St Mary Overie received the new dedication of St Saviour and became the church of a new parish, which combined those of St Mary Magdalen (the attached parochial chapel) and the nearby church of St Margaret, which was deconsecrated. The parishioners leased the priory church and rectory from the Crown until 1614, when they purchased the church outright for £800.

During the reign of Queen Mary heresy trials were held in the retrochoir. In January 1555, six high-ranking clergymen, including the former Bishop of Gloucester, John Hooper, were condemned to death there.

As the parish church for the Bankside area, St Saviour's had close connections with the great Elizabethan dramatists. William Shakespeare's brother, Edmund, was buried there in 1607. His grave is unmarked, but a commemorative stone was later placed in the paving of the choir. The cathedral instituted a festival to commemorate this cultural history in the 1920s which endured into the late 20th century.

There is a large stained glass window dedicated to William Shakespeare, depicting scenes from his plays, at the base of which is an alabaster statue representing the playwright reclining, holding a quill. Two dramatists, John Fletcher and Philip Massinger were buried in the church. Along with Edward Alleyn they were officers and benefactors of the parish charities and of St Saviour's Grammar School.

John Harvard, a clergyman and school benefactor who helped found Harvard University, for whom the university is named, was born in the parish and was baptised in the church on 29 November 1607. He is commemorated by the Harvard Chapel in the north transept, paid for by Harvard University alumni resident in England. His father, Robert, a local butcher and inn-holder, was a business associate of Shakespeare's family and a parochial, school, and church officer with the playwright's colleagues.

The connection with the bishops of Winchester continued after the Reformation. Lancelot Andrewes, bishop of Winchester until his death in 1626, and a contributor to the Authorized Version of the Bible, was buried in a small chapel at the east end that afterwards became known as the "Bishop's Chapel". After the destruction of the chapel in 1830, his tomb was moved to a new position, immediately behind the high altar.

It was from the tower of St Saviour's that the Czech artist Wenceslas Hollar drew his Long View of London from Bankside in 1647, a panorama which has become a definitive image of the city in the 17th century.

=== 19th century ===
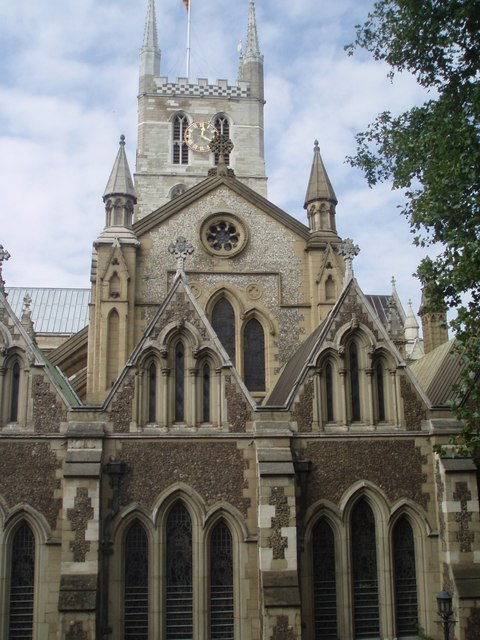
The tower and east end of the cathedral, restored by George Gwilt the Younger in the 19th century

By the early 19th century the fabric of the church had fallen into disrepair. All the medieval furnishings were gone, and the interior was as Francis Bumpus later described it, "pewed and galleried to a fearful extent." Between 1818 and 1830, the tower and choir were restored by George Gwilt Jun. In his efforts to return the church to its thirteenth-century appearance, Gwilt removed the early sixteenth-century windows at the east end of the choir and, lacking firm evidence as to the original design, substituted an elevation of his own invention, with three lancet windows, and a circular one in the gable above. The transepts were restored, less sympathetically, by Robert Wallace. The Bishop's Chapel and parochial chapel were removed, but plans for the demolition of the retrochoir were averted, and it was restored by Gwilt in 1832.

At a vestry meeting held in May 1831 it was decided to remove the nave roof, which had become unsafe, leaving the interior open to the weather, and to hold all future services in the choir and transepts. In 1839, the roofless nave was demolished to within seven feet of the ground, and rebuilt to a design by Henry Rose.

The new nave was at a higher level than the surviving mediaeval eastern part, and closed off from it by a glazed screen. It had a plaster vault carried on iron columns, and a wooden gallery around three sides. It was widely criticised, notably by Pugin who wrote "It is bad enough to see such an erection spring up at all, but when a venerable building is demolished to make way for it, the case is quite intolerable."

On the initiative of Anthony Thorold, Bishop of Rochester, the nave was once again rebuilt between 1890 and 1897 by Arthur Blomfield, in a manner intended to recreate its 13th-century predecessor as accurately as possible, and to preserve the few surviving mediaeval fragments. In 1895 an appeal was issued to complete the restoration, with some £8000 required to restore the choir and tower. The church's treasurer was Sir Frederick Wigan.

The main railway viaduct connecting London Bridge station to Blackfriars, Cannon Street and Charing Cross stations passes only eighteen metres from the southeast corner of the cathedral, blocking the view from the south side. This was a compromise when the railway was extended along this viaduct in 1852; the alternative was to demolish the building completely to allow a more direct passage for the line.

The churchyard was closed to burials in 1853 (an exception being made in 1856 for Gwilt). In 1910, on behalf of the cathedral chapter, the Metropolitan Public Gardens Association's landscape gardener Madeline Agar renovated the south-west corner of the churchyard. That garden was restored in 2001.

=== Since 1900 ===
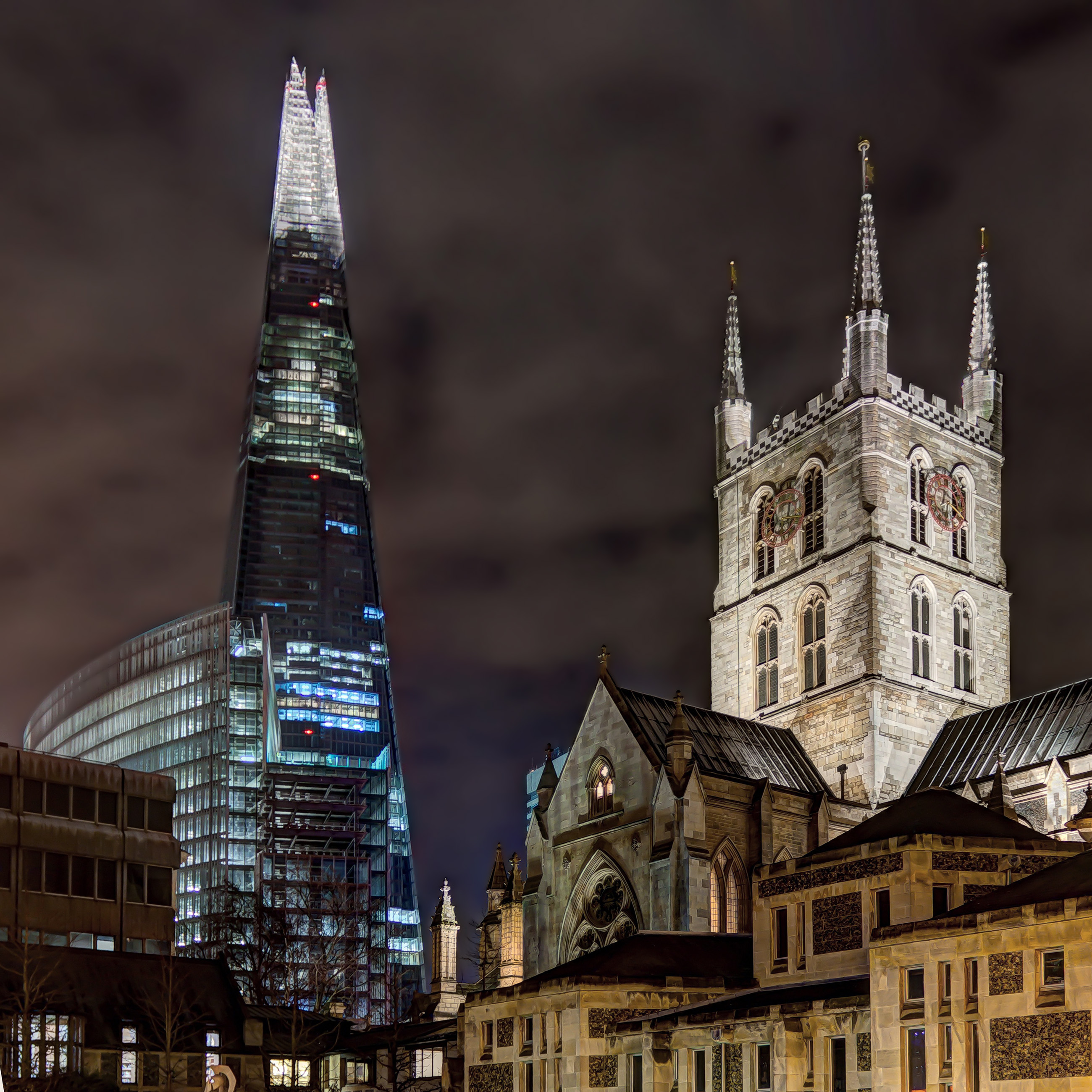
Southwark Cathedral floodlit, with The Shard behind it.

The collegiate parish church of St Saviour was designated as a cathedral in 1905 when the Church of England Diocese of Southwark was created. The nearby early-18th-century church of St Thomas became the new cathedral's chapter-house.

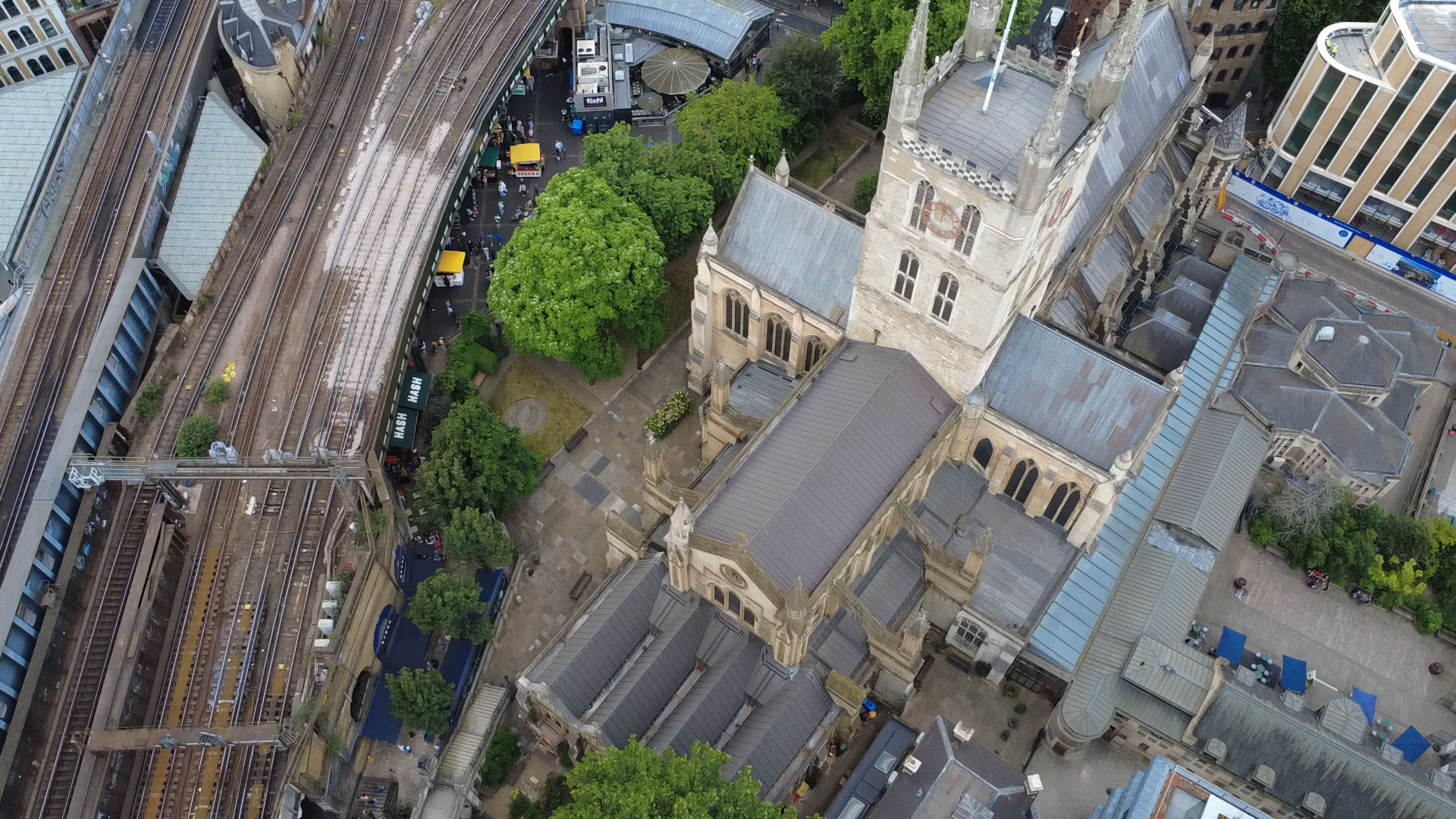
Southwark Cathedral, facing SW. The retrochoir is nearest, with associated Cathedral buildings and courtyard to the right, Borough Market at the top and London Bridge Station to the left.

The cathedral stands in an area heavily damaged by German bombing during the Second World War. The total number of bombs dropped on Southwark between 7 October 1940 to 6 June 1941 alone was 1,651 High Explosive Bombs and 20 Parachute Mines. On 20 February 1941 it was reported (after being unrestricted by the ministry of information) that the cathedral had been damaged by a bomb. Shrapnel damage is still visible on the outside of the building to this day.

There are memorials to Isabella Gilmore and the victims of the Marchioness disaster and monuments to Nelson Mandela and Desmond Tutu. In 2001 Mandela opened a new northern "cloister" on the site of the old monastic one, with a refectory, shop, conference centre, education centre and museum. In 2002, these Millennium buildings received an award for being one of the best new buildings of the year.

On 16 November 1996 the cathedral became a focus of controversy when it hosted a twentieth-anniversary service for the Lesbian and Gay Christian Movement. Jeffrey John, the openly gay Dean of St Albans and former bishop-elect of Reading, had been Canon Theologian of Southwark.

After the introduction of civil partnerships and, later, of civil marriage for same-sex couples in England, the cathedral announced that "same sex couples are welcome to approach the clergy with regard to preparation and prayers when entering a Civil Partnership and for continuing support and counsel within their relationship ... couples approaching the clergy should expect a warm welcome and affirmation". The cathedral now says, "Southwark Cathedral is an inclusive community where LGBTi+ people are welcomed and affirmed. The clergy would be delighted to help you to prepare prayerfully for your Civil Partnership."

== Other information ==
Coat of arms of Southwark Cathedral, officially granted in its current form in 2000. The cross lozengy is taken from the arms of the Diocese of Southwark (albeit with a different colour scheme), and stands for the cathedral's dedication to St Saviour. The white lily in the canton stands for the cathedral's dedication to St Mary Overie.

Flag of Southwark Cathedral, based on its coat of arms, usually flown from the cathedral tower.

The cathedral is used by London South Bank University for its annual honorary degree ceremony, by Regent's College for its graduation ceremonies, and by King's College London for its medical and dental degree ceremonies, an association stemming from its merger with Guy's and St Thomas' teaching hospitals, St Thomas' having started as an infirmary attached to the Priory of St Mary. The cathedral also hosts the London Nautical School's annual Christmas Carol Service.

There are two other cathedrals in Southwark: the Roman Catholic St George's Cathedral Southwark and the Greek Orthodox St Mary's at Camberwell New Road.

The great Altar-Screen of Bishop Fox

Between 1520-1528, in the episcopate of Richard Fox (Bishop of Winchester), and possibly at his expense, a splendid stone altar-screen was erected by him with two small doors through it to the retrochoir. Whether all the original statues were ever installed is uncertain, as the screen was completed within a decade of the Reformation, when such statues were forbidden. It is about 30 ft. high, and occupies the whole of the east wall below the window. Although the general appearance of the screen is that of the original, most of the detail (including the statues and gilding) is from the 19th and (early) 20th century.

In 1703 Bishop Fox’s screen was defaced to make a flat surface for the fitting of a ‘classical’ wooden reredos. The gothic canopies had been “unsparingly hacked, almost to a plane surface”.

After the removal of the wooden reredos in 1830, Bishop Fox’s stone screen was completely restored - and altered in many respects - by Richard Wallace, the architect of the transept repairs of 1829/'30. The original portions of the screen are of Caen and firestone, the restoration in Painswick stone. Nearly the whole of the ornamental detail was “scrupulously worked from moulds made from the original remains, and replaced in the same situations […]”. A woodcut by I. Dodd illustrating an article in the periodical “The Mirror of Literature, Amusement and Instruction” (Vol. 23, no 656, p. 225) shows the state of the restored altar screen in 1834. Among the few surviving fragments of late medieval sculpture are probably the small repetitions of the Lamb of God and the Pelican in her Piety (a badge of Bishop Fox) directly below the rows of angels, and the grotesque carvings in the spandrels of the two doorways showing hunting scenes, including a man chasing a fox (a humorous allusion to Bishop Fox's name). The majority of the statues set in the niches were carved by Messrs Nicolls of Lambeth from 1905 onwards. They represent key figures in the history of the church in which they stand.

== Resident cat ==
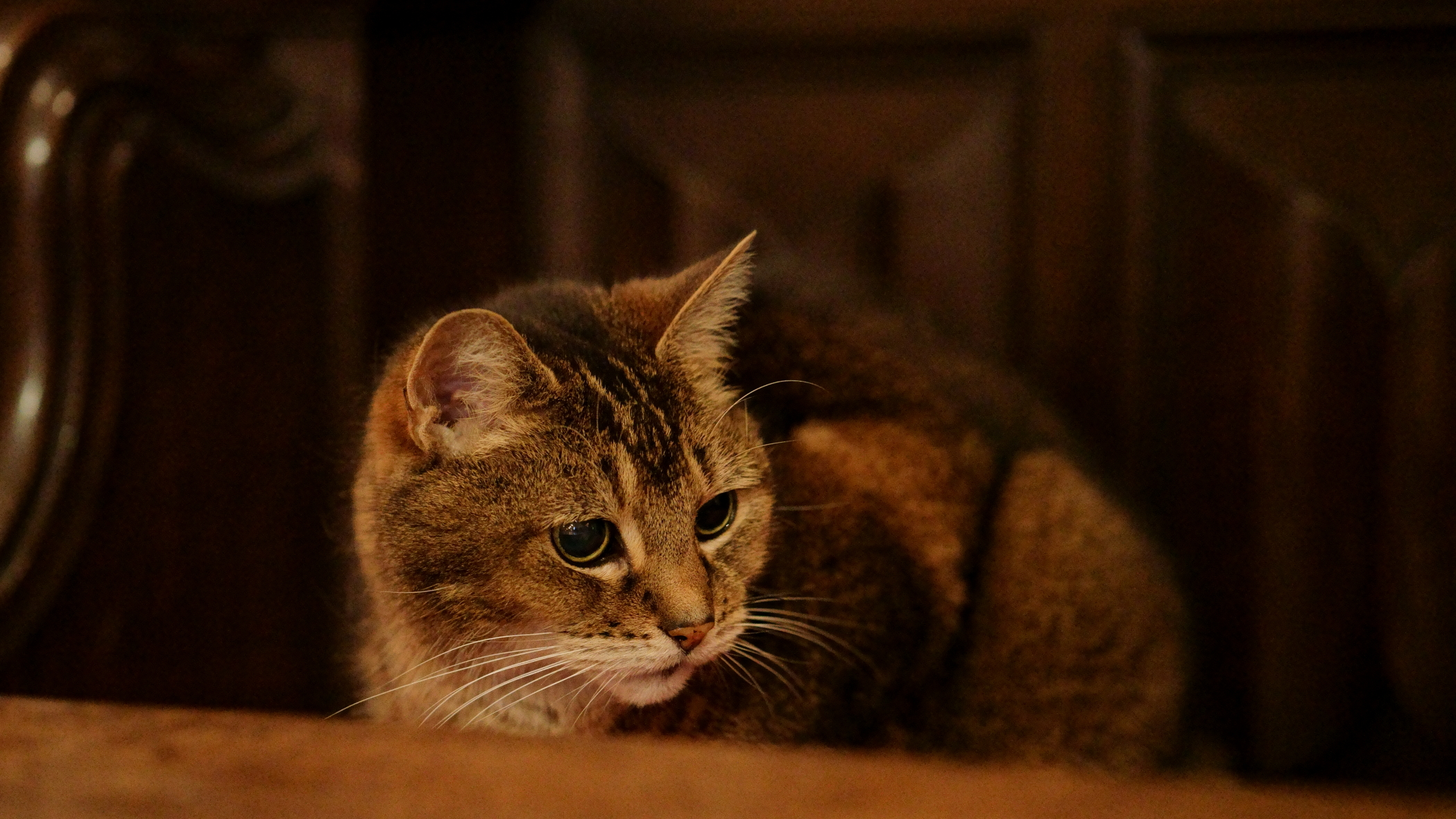
Doorkins Magnificat, the previous resident cat of Southwark Cathedral

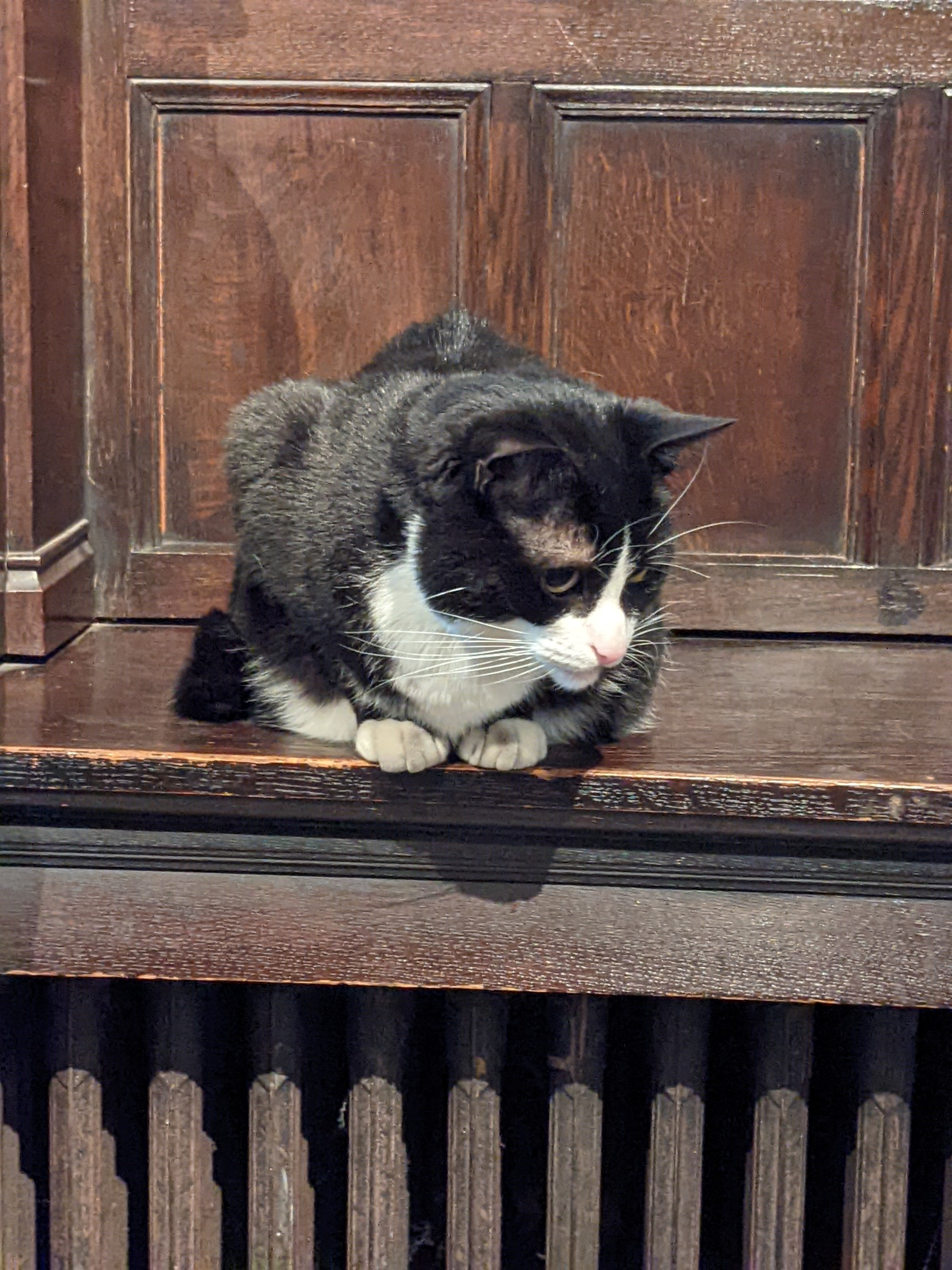
Hodge, the current resident cat

The cathedral is known for having a resident cat. The first such cat Doorkins Magnificat, a brown female cat who began visiting in 2008 as a stray looking for food and shelter. She later made the cathedral her permanent home and was often found curled up beneath a radiator or prowling the aisles. Dean Colin Slee named the cat as a joke reference to prominent atheist Richard Dawkins. Doorkins became known as a local celebrity and met both the Mayor of London and Queen Elizabeth II on formal visits to the cathedral. She is the subject of the children's book Doorkins the Cathedral Cat, and in 2018 was immortalised with a stone gargoyle inside the cathedral. Doorkins retired from the cathedral and was adopted by one of the cathedral staff in October 2019. The death of Doorkins was reported on 2 October 2020. A memorial service was held at the cathedral on 27 October 2020, something apparently unprecedented for a cat and reported in the national press.

The cathedral made plans to acquire a new cat in 2020, due to mouse problems in the building and a feeling that Doorkins' presence was missed. Hodge, a black and white tuxedo cat, was formally adopted from a rescue organisation in 2020, coincidentally on the day of Doorkins' death. Like Doorkins, Hodge has become a celebrity in his own right with various souvenirs available in the cathedral shop, and his own social media accounts.

== Cathedral choirs ==
=== Main Cathedral Choir ===
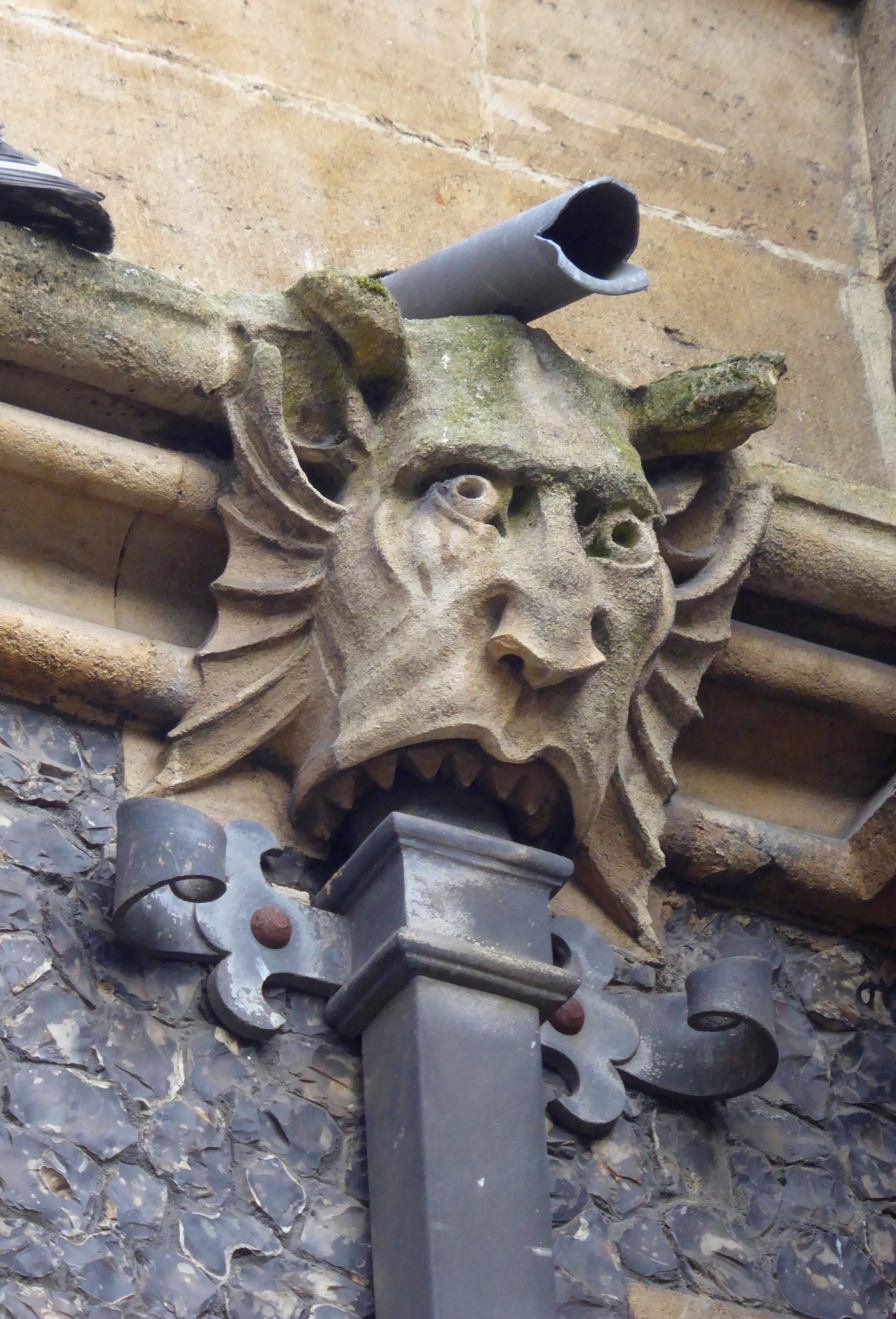
A gargoyle on the exterior of the cathedral

The Cathedral Choir is supported financially by the St Olave's & St Saviour's Schools Foundation, which stems from the two parochial schools set up in the 1560s which still hold their commemoration and annual services at the cathedral as their 'foundation' church. As the cathedral does not have a choir school, the boys and girls of the Cathedral Choir are drawn from schools throughout London and surrounding areas. Girls are usually admitted to the choir between the ages of ten and eleven, and boys between the ages of seven and ten. There are six Lay Clerks in the Cathedral Choir and up to six Choral Scholars. Three of the Lay Clerks are supported by endowments from The Ouseley Trust, the Vernon Ellis Foundation, and the Friends of Cathedral Music.

The Cathedral Choir performed the music for the television series Mr. Bean.

Former choristers of Southwark Cathedral include David Gedge, who served as Organist of Brecon Cathedral from 1966 until 2007, Richard Marlow, who subsequently directed the choir at Trinity College, Cambridge, and Chuka Umunna, former Member of Parliament for Streatham and formerly Shadow Secretary of State for Business, Innovation and Skills.

Ernest Lough, who later made a celebrated recording of O for the Wings of a Dove with the choir of the Temple Church under George Thalben-Ball, auditioned unsuccessfully for a position as chorister at Southwark Cathedral.

Both Alan Young and Jonathan Darbourne, Hammerstein Chanters (head choristers) between 1999 and 2000, were also trebles at English National Opera. Darbourne, in particular, is known for critically acclaimed performances as Miles in Britten's The Turn of the Screw at the East London Theatre on Well Street (now Ensign Street) and as one of the three Child-Spirits in Mozart's The Magic Flute at the London Coliseum. Young performed Harry in Britten's Albert Herring, Paris in Tippet's King Priam, and John (silent role) in Britten's Peter Grimes. Rollo Armstrong also used Young's recorded vocals for Dusted's single Always Remember to Respect and Honour Your Mother, which reached no. 19 in the UK single charts.

=== Merbecke Choir ===
In 2004 the cathedral founded the Southwark Cathedral Merbecke Choir. It is intended to be the place both for boys and girls who leave the cathedral choirs and also other young singers who wish to maintain their sight-reading skills acquired as choristers and explore a wide range of repertoire under expert tuition.

The choir sings Compline on the fourth Sunday of each month and performs a seasonal concert of music each term. It also sings for livery companies in the City of London and for other organisations. In 2006 it performed as part of the Queen's Christmas Broadcast, which was recorded at the cathedral.

The choir is named after the Tudor composer John Merbecke (1510–1585) who wrote one of the most popular settings of the Book of Common Prayer communion service. In 1543, Merbecke and three other companions were tried for heresy in the retrochoir at Southwark. He was found guilty and condemned to death, but his sentence was commuted by Stephen Gardiner, Bishop of Winchester, who decided that, as a mere musician, Merbecke "knew no better".

=== Thursday Singers ===
The Thursday Singers are made up of people from the local community. There is no audition. They sing for festival Eucharists which fall on a weekday. They also sing one service of Choral Evensong most terms and lead the singing at the cathedral's Carol Sing-In before Christmas.

=== Hubert Chesshyre and child sexual abuse scandal ===
Hubert Chesshyre was a lay clerk of Southwark Cathedral from 1971 until 2003. He was also a member of the British Royal Household, serving as Clarenceux King of Arms and Secretary of the Order of the Garter. Because of his connections with both the Royal Household and the cathedral choir, Chesshyre saw through a grant of a coat of arms to the cathedral and a separate grant awarding heraldic badges to the area bishops of Kingston-upon-Thames, Woolwich, and Croydon.

At a trial of the facts held in 2015, it was proven that Chesshyre, who had dementia and was therefore found to be unfit to plead, had sexually abused a teenage chorister during the 1990s.

== Organ ==
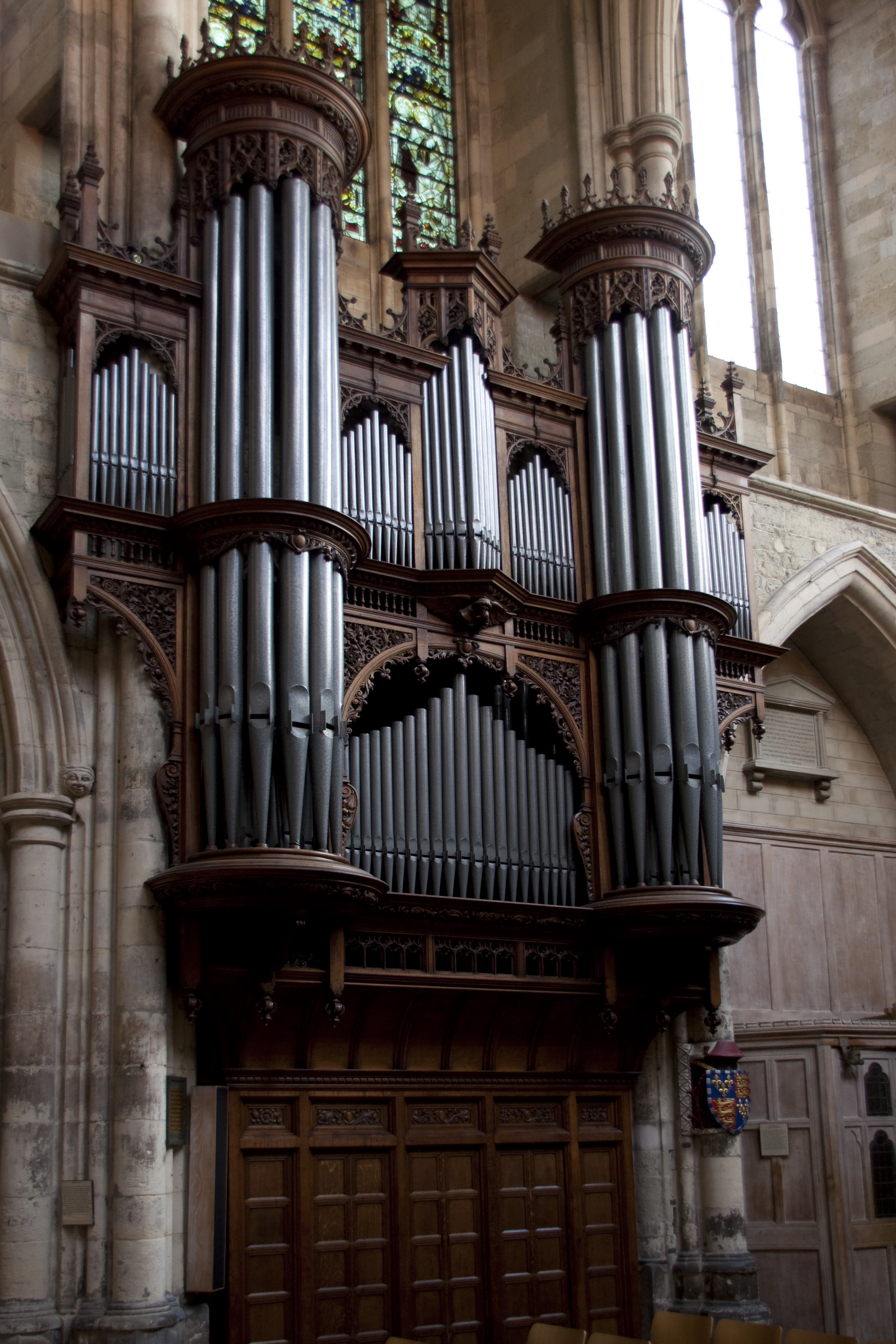
The cathedral's main organ, known as the Lewis Organ.

The cathedral's main organ was built by Lewis & Co. of Brixton, and completed in 1897. It was inspired by the Schulze organ of Doncaster Minster. Thomas Christopher Lewis, the company's founder, was renowned for building instruments that had a bright, vibrant tone which, in part, was due to his use of low wind pressures. Consequently, he was somewhat out of step with the trend at the time, which was tending towards high wind pressures and rather thicker tone. The instrument's action was, and is, electro-pneumatic with slider chests, and the main case was designed by Arthur Blomfield.

Apart from routine maintenance, the instrument remained untouched until 1952, when Henry Willis & Sons undertook a major rebuild, during which the wind pressures were increased. The balanced swell pedal and the hitch-down solo pedal were replaced by Willis's Infinite Speed and Gradation pedals. The choir organ – which had been housed in front of the swell – was relocated to the north side, and a new console was installed adjacent to it (the original console was on the south side). The choir organ's Flauto Traverso was replaced by a nazard, and a tierce was provided on a new slider. A number of new couplers were also provided and the violon unit (32'-16'-8') was extended by 12 pipes to create a Viola 4'.

Some years after the rebuild it was thought that the Willis changes, though well intentioned, detracted too much from the original concept, so it was decided to restore the instrument to the Lewis specifications. The Durham-based firm of Harrison and Harrison was engaged, and the work was carried out in two stages. In 1986, the electrics were renewed, and although the Willis console was retained, it was given a solid state action with eight memory levels for the combination pistons and four for the crescendo pedal. Also, the Willis swell pedals were replaced by balanced pedals.

In 1991, the main work was undertaken, including the re-voicing of the stops on Lewis's original wind pressures. A Lewis Flauto Traverso rank was obtained for the choir organ, to replace the one discarded by Willis, and the nazard and tierce were removed – meaning that the great organ's octave quint is now the instrument's only mutation register. The two prepared for drawstops on the pedal were also disposed of. Thus, the stop list is now as Lewis left it, except for the Viola 4' which was retained because it was a gift in memoriam.

Former organists of Southwark Cathedral have included organist/composer Starling Goodwin (1711-1774) who also played at the Ranelagh Gardens, E. T. Cook, who was known for his lunchtime organ broadcasts on the BBC, and the organ builder Ralph Downes.

I Choir C–c^{4}
Lieblich Gedackt	16′
Geigen Principal	8′
Salicional	8′
Dulciana	8′
Lieblich Gedackt	8′
Salicet	4′
Flauto Traverso	4′
Lieblich Gedackt	4′
Lieblich Gedackt	2′
Mixture III

II Great C–c^{4}
Contra Viole	16′
Bourdon	16′
Open Diapason No.1	8′
Open Diapason No.2	8′
Stopped Diapason	8′
Flûte Harmonique	8′
Octave	4′
Flûte Harmonique	4′
Octave Quint	2^{2}/_{3}′
Super Octave	2′
Cornet III-V
Mixture IV
Trumpet	8′

III Swell C–c^{4}
Lieblich Bourdun	16′
Open Diapason	8′
Viole da Gambe	8′
Voix Celestes	8′
Rohr Flöte	8′
Geigen Principal	4′
Rohr Flöte	4′
Flautino	2′
Mixture IV
Contra Fagotto	16′
Horn	8′
Oboe	8′
Voix Humaine	8′
Clarion	4′
Tremolo

IV Solo C–c^{4}
Vox Angelica	8′
Unda Maris	8′
Flûte harm.	8′
Flûte harm	4′
Trombone	16′
Cor Anglais	16′
Tuba Magna	8′
Trompette harm.	8′
Orchestral Oboe	8′
Clarinet	8′
Tremolo

Pedal C–f^{1}
Great Bass	32′
Major Violon	32′
Open Bass	16′
Violon	16′
Dulciana Bass	16′
Sub Bass	16′
Violoncello	8′
Flute	8′
Viola	4′
Octave Flute	4′
Contra Posaune	32′
Bombarde	16′
Posaune	16′
Trumpet	8′

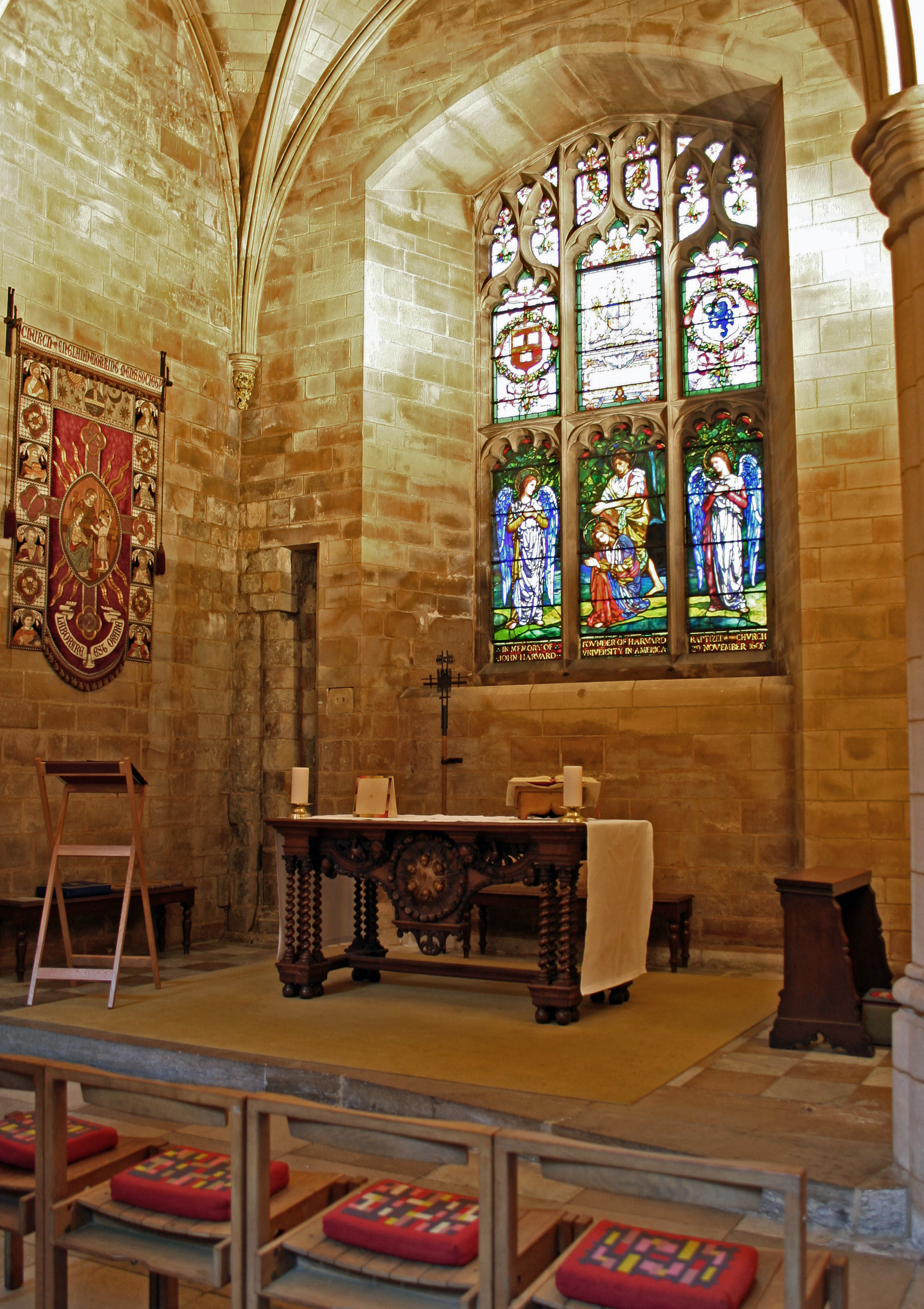
The Harvard Chapel, in the north transept, was rebuilt with donations from Harvard graduates and dedicated in 1907. The stained glass was designed by the American artist John La Farge and was made in America under the supervision of Charles F. McKim, the American architect. The window was given by the US Ambassador, Joseph Choate.

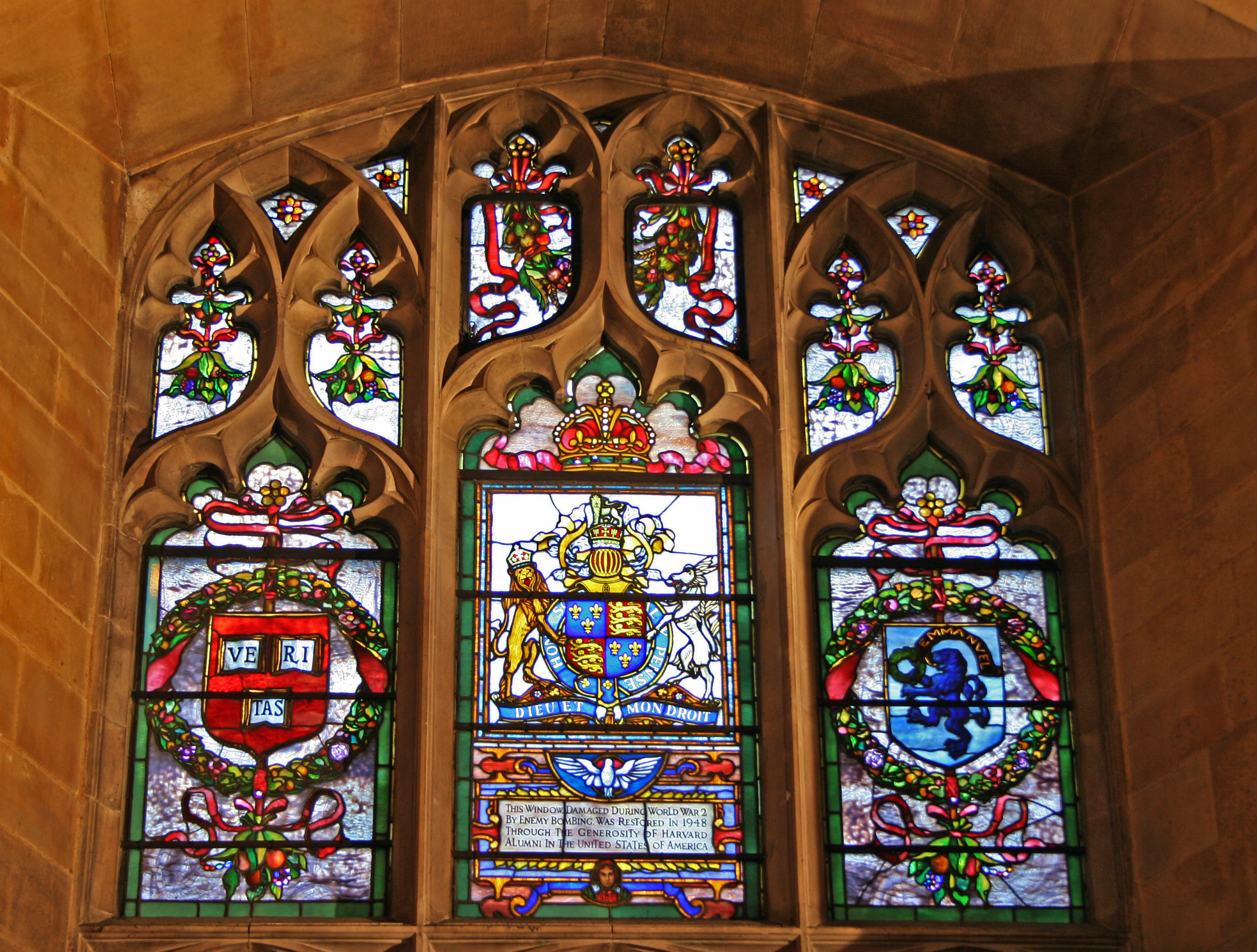
The upper section of the John Harvard window shows the red shield of Harvard College with its motto Veritas (Truth) and the blue lion on the shield of Emmanuel College, Cambridge. John Harvard gained his BA degree at Emmanuel College in 1632 and MA in 1635.

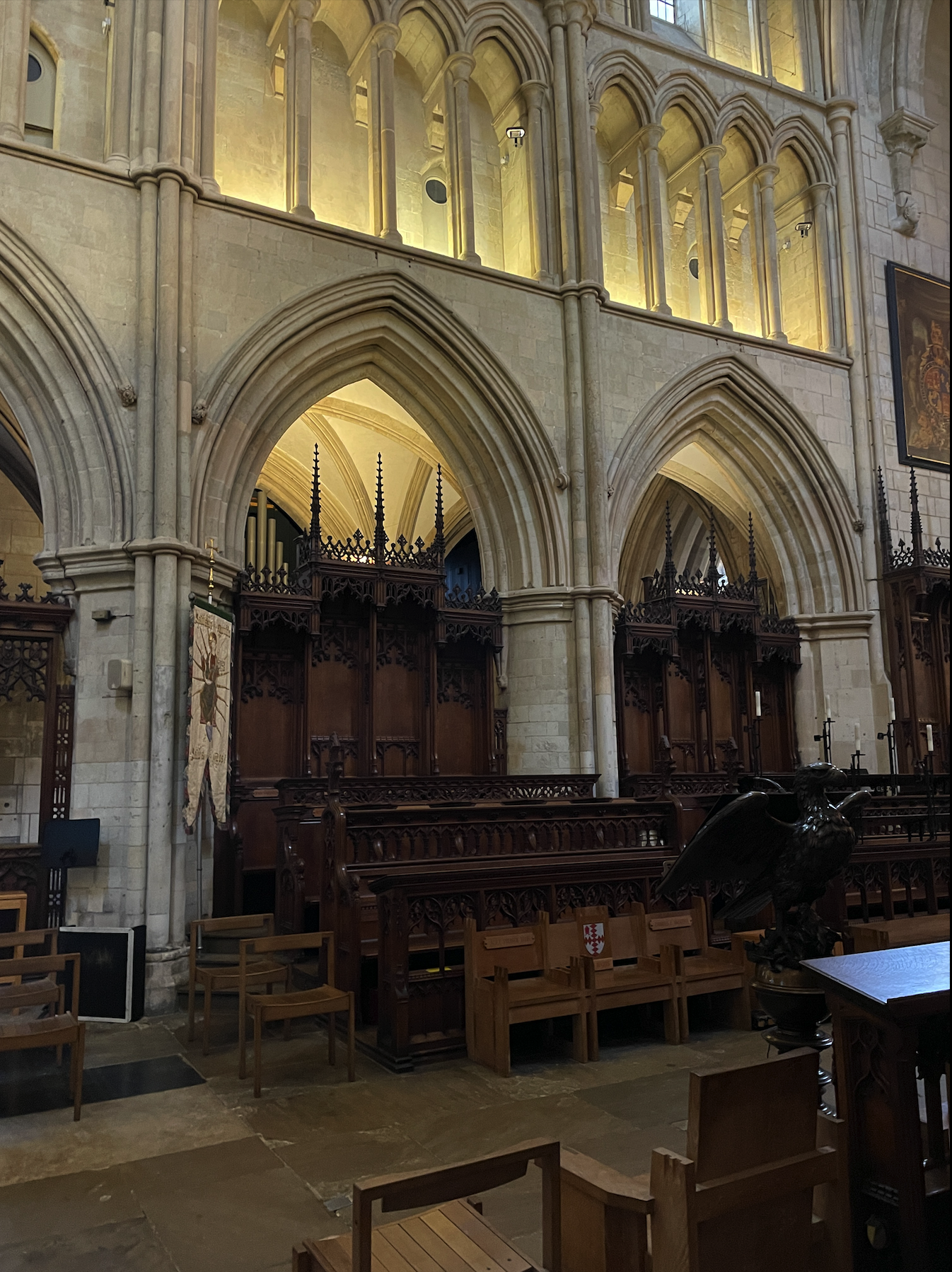
A view of the Nave on Christmas Eve, Southwark Cathedral, 2021

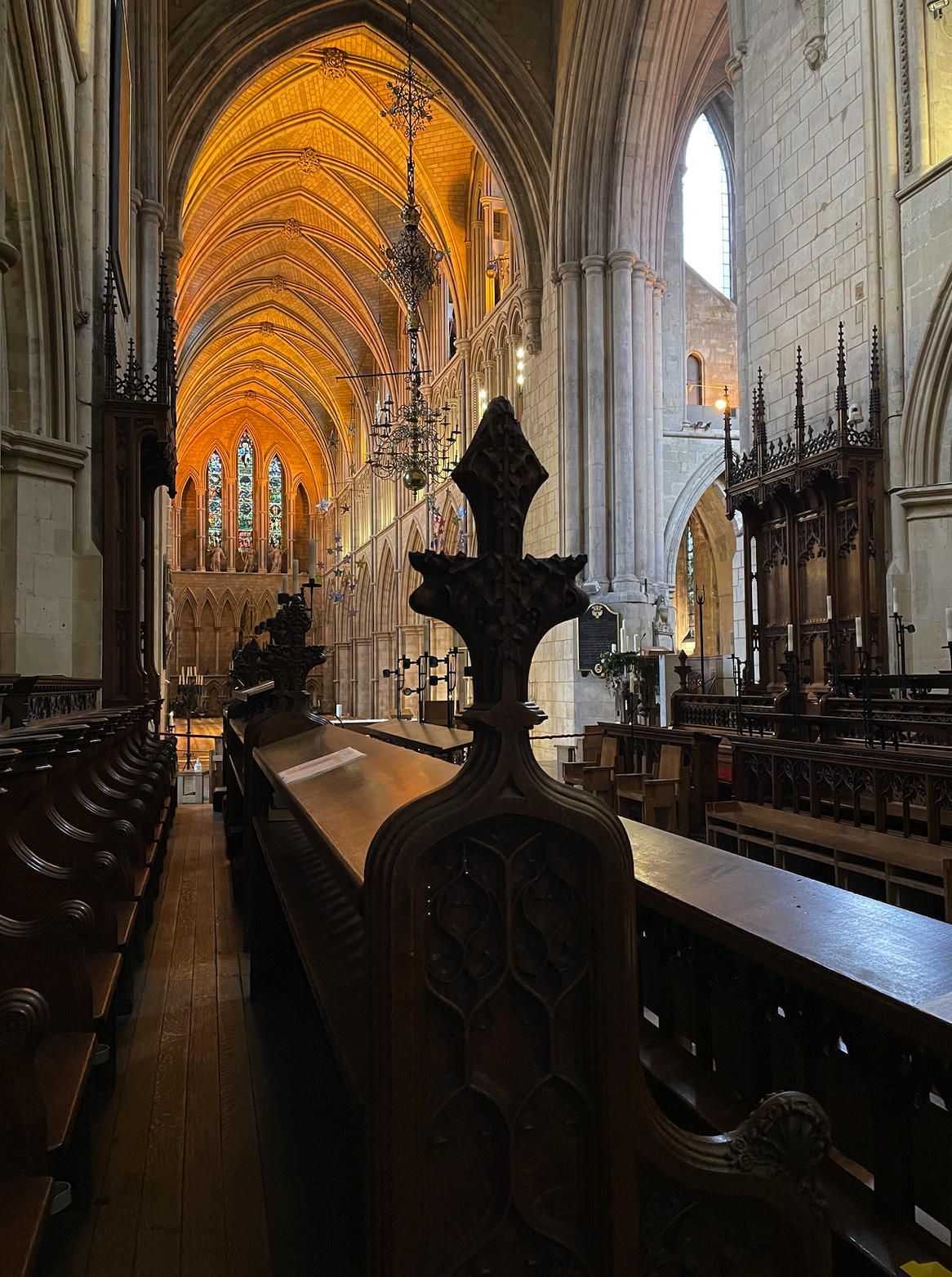
A view of the Nave, Southwark Cathedral during organ practice

== See also ==
- St Paul's Cathedral – the Anglican cathedral in the neighbouring Diocese of London
- St George's Cathedral, Southwark – the Roman Catholic cathedral in the Archdiocese of Southwark

General:

- List of churches and cathedrals of London
- List of cathedrals in the United Kingdom
- Architecture of the medieval cathedrals of England
- English Gothic architecture
- Church of England

== Sources ==
- Bumpus, T. Francis (1930). The Cathedrals of England and Wales. London: T. Werner Laurie.
- Cherry, Bridget; Pevsner, Nikolaus (1990) [1983]. London 2: South. The Buildings of England. Penguin Books. ISBN 0-14-071047-7.
- Sobecki, Sebastian (2015). "Ecce patet tensus: The Trentham Manuscript, In Praise of Peace, and John Gower's Autograph Hand" (PDF). Speculum. 90 (4): 925–959. doi:10.1017/S0038713415002316. hdl:11370/534fae63-f48c-417a-8747-4d673e52131a. S2CID 161436764.
- Worley, George (1905). Southwark Cathedral. Bell's Cathedrals. London: George Bell & Sons.
