= Michael Brown (English priest) =

English priest (1915-2004)

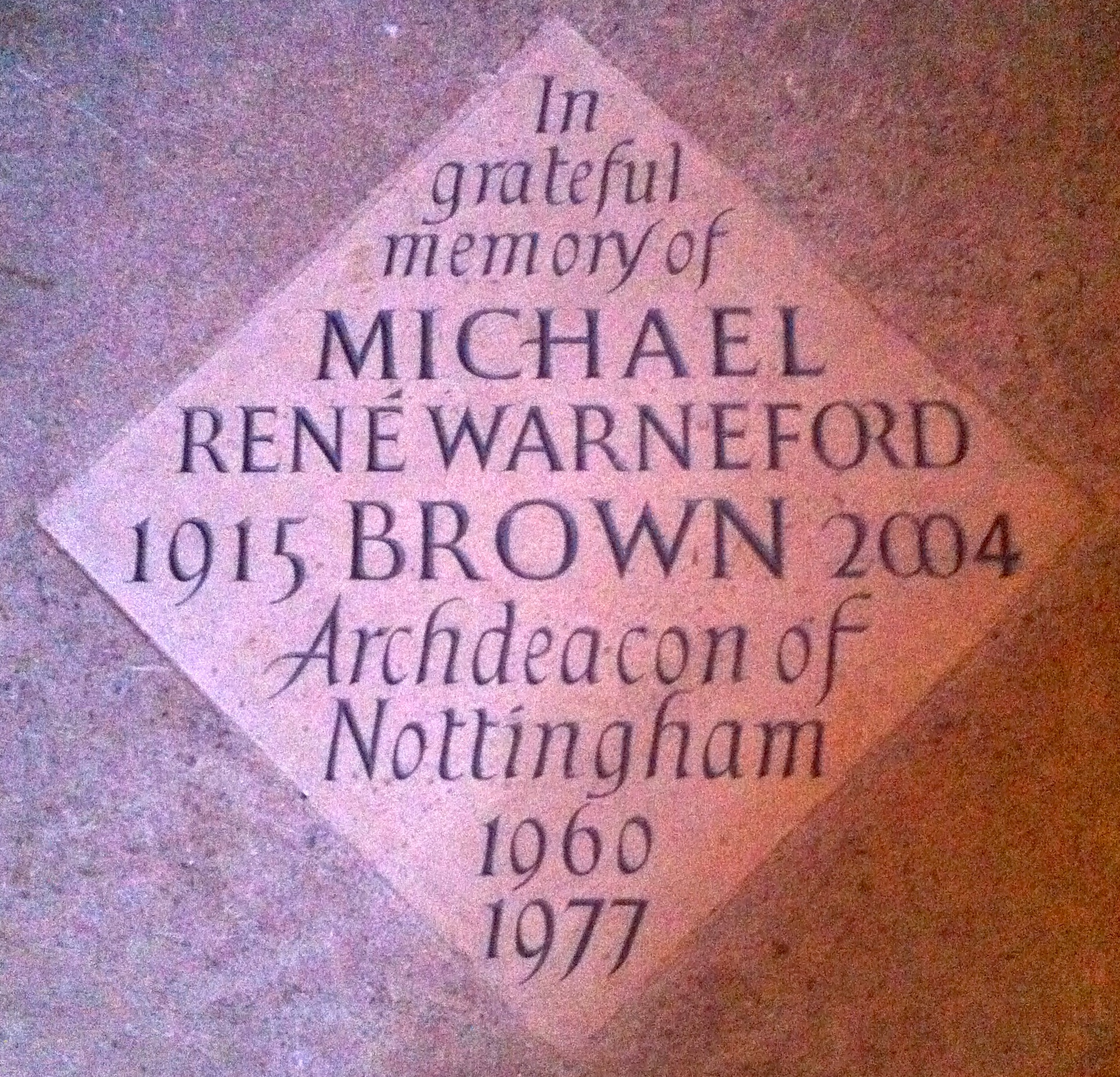
Memorial in Southwell Minster

The Venerable Michael Rene Warneford Brown (7 June 1915 – 14 February 2004) was Archdeacon of Nottingham from 1960 to 1977.

He was born in Gravesend, Kent and educated at King's School, Rochester. He studied history and theology at St Peter's College, Oxford and then St Stephen's House, Oxford.

He was ordained in 1941 by Rt. Revd. George Bell, the Bishop of Chichester and served as a curate at West Grinstead. In 1943 he became chaplain to the Royal Naval Volunteer Reserve.

From 1950 to 1960 he worked at Church House in London. In 1960 he was appointed Archdeacon of Nottingham, a position he held until 1977.
