= My Famous Family =

My Famous Family is a British television programme on genealogy, co-hosted by Bill Oddie and Guy de la Bédoyère. Each episode shows an ordinary member of the public with a famous ancestor: Queen Victoria, Florence Nightingale, George Stephenson, Lawrence of Arabia, or the Duke of Wellington.

It was broadcast in 2007 on the UKTV History channel (now called Yesterday), one of the UKTV channels.
