= Gordon Ogilvie (priest) =

British Anglican priest

The Venerable Gordon Ogilvie
- Archdeacon of Nottingham
- Church: Church of England
- Diocese: Diocese of Southwell and Nottingham
- In office: 1996 to 2006

Orders
- Ordination: 1967 (deacon); 1968 (priest)

Personal details
- Born: 22 August 1942 (age 83)
- Denomination: Anglicanism
- Spouse: Sylvia (m. 1967)
- Children: Two
- Education: Hillhead High School
- Alma mater: University of Glasgow; London College of Divinity; University of London

Gordon Ogilvie (born 22 August 1942) is a retired British Anglican priest. He was Archdeacon of Nottingham from 1996 until 2006.

== Early life and education ==
Ogilvie was born on 22 August 1942. He was educated at Hillhead High School, then a grammar school in Glasgow. He studied at the University of Glasgow, and graduated with an undergraduate Master of Arts (MA) degree in 1964. He then entered the London College of Divinity, an Evangelical Anglican theological college, to train for ordination. During this time he also studied theology at the University of London as an external student, and graduated with a Bachelor of Divinity (BD) degree in 1967.

== Ordained ministry ==
Ogilvie was ordained in the Church of England as a deacon in 1967 and as a priest in 1968. From 1967 to 1972, he served his curacy at St Giles' and St George's, Ashtead in the Diocese of Guildford. He then moved to the Diocese of St Albans where he was Vicar of St James's Church, New Barnet from 1972 until 1980.

In 1980, he became Director of Pastoral Studies at Wycliffe Hall, Oxford. In 1989, he became Team Rector of Harlow. He was made an honorary canon of Chelmsford Cathedral in January 1994. From 1996 to 2006, he was Archdeacon of Nottingham in the Diocese of Southwell and Nottingham.

Since 2007, Ogilvie has held Permission to Officiate in the Diocese of St Andrews, Dunkeld and Dunblane. During his retirement, he continues his ministry part-time as a member of the clergy team of Saint Andrew's Church, an Episcopal church in St Andrews.

== Personal life ==
In 1967, Ogilvie married Sylvia Margaret Weir. Together they have two children: one son and one daughter.

Church of England titles
Preceded by Tom Walker	Archdeacon of Nottingham; 1996–2006	Succeeded by Peter Hill
