= Cuthbert Marshall =

Archdeacon of Nottingham

Cuthbert Marshall (fl. 1536) was Archdeacon of Nottingham during the reign of King Henry VIII of England.
