= Charles de la Bédoyère =

French general

- Charles Angélique François Huchet de La Bédoyère
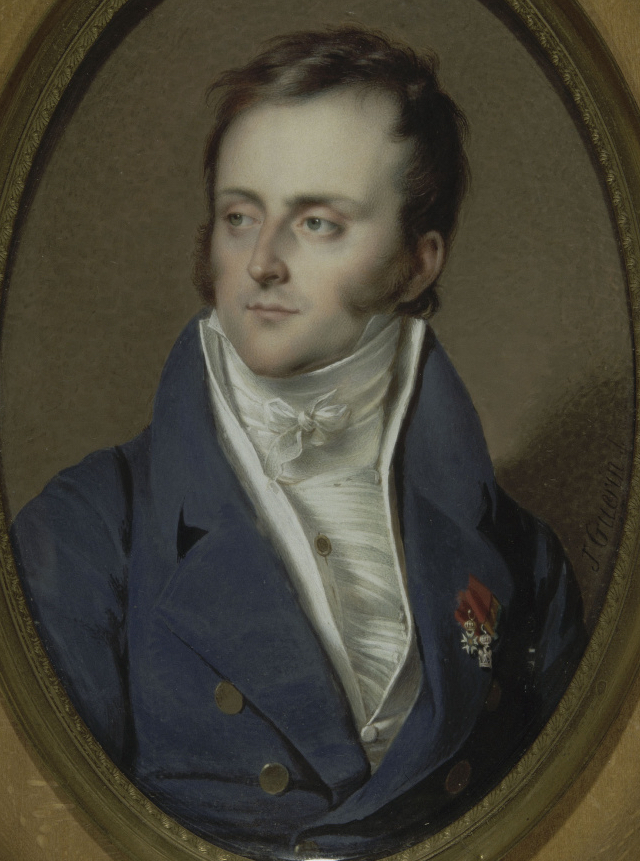
- Portrait of La Bédoyère by Jean-Urbain Guérin
- Born: 17 April 1786; Paris
- Died: 19 August 1815 (aged 29); Plaine de Grenelle, Paris
- Military career
- Allegiance: French Empire
- Service years: 1806 – 1815
- Rank: General
- Commands: 112e de ligne, 7ede ligne

Charles Angélique François Huchet, Comte de la Bédoyère (French: [ʃaʁl də la bedwajɛʁ]; 17 April 1786 – 19 August 1815) was a French general during the reign of Emperor Napoleon I. He was executed in 1815 by the restored Bourbon monarchy, having been an aide-de-camp to Napoleon throughout the Hundred Days before the Battle of Waterloo.

== Biography ==
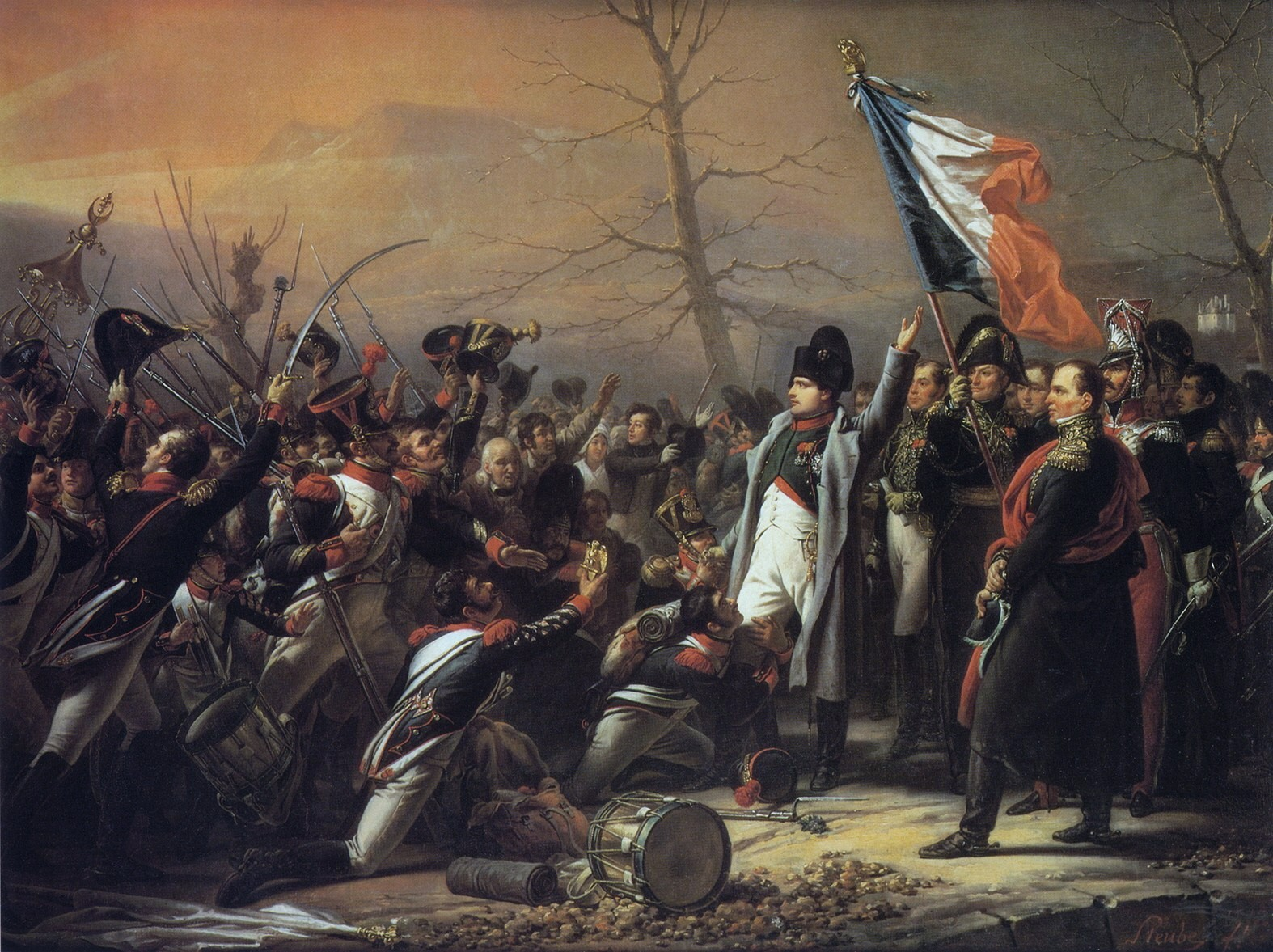
Napoleon's Return from Elba by Charles de Steuben, 1818

Descended from an old Breton family, he entered the army in late 1806 as a second lieutenant, serving as an aide-de-camp to Marshal Lannes and then Prince Eugene. Comte de la Bédoyère saw active service in Spain, Italy, Germany, Russia and France, and was awarded the Legion of Honour and the Iron Crown. He was a colonel commanding the 7th Regiment of the Line at Grenoble when Napoleon returned from exile in Elba and marched north to Paris. On 8 March, Bédoyère and his regiment went over to Napoleon en masse.

During the Waterloo campaign Bédoyère, now promoted to Général de Brigade and an aide-de-camp of the Emperor, was probably the officer sent with a message to d'Erlon's I Corps, then marching west to join Ney at Quatre Bras, ordering him to turn east to support the Emperor at Ligny. Ney was furious when he learned the corps was marching away from his battle and sent another order for it to return immediately to Quatre-Bras. As a result of these orders and counter-orders, d'Erlon's 20,000 men, which could have sealed the fate of the Anglo-Dutch at Quatre-Bras or the Prussians at Ligny, spent the entire day marching back and forth without firing a shot.

Two days later at the Battle of Waterloo, Bédoyère was one of the last to leave the battlefield. Afterwards, finding that he was not eligible for amnesty as he believed, he secretly travelled to Paris to see his wife before heading to Switzerland and exile. However, he was recognized and arrested, tried by a military court and condemned to death by firing squad, carried out at Grenelle on 19 August 1815.

Charles Huchet de la Bédoyère rests in the Père Lachaise Cemetery in Paris. Napoleon's will of 1815 left money for his children, later added to by a codicil.

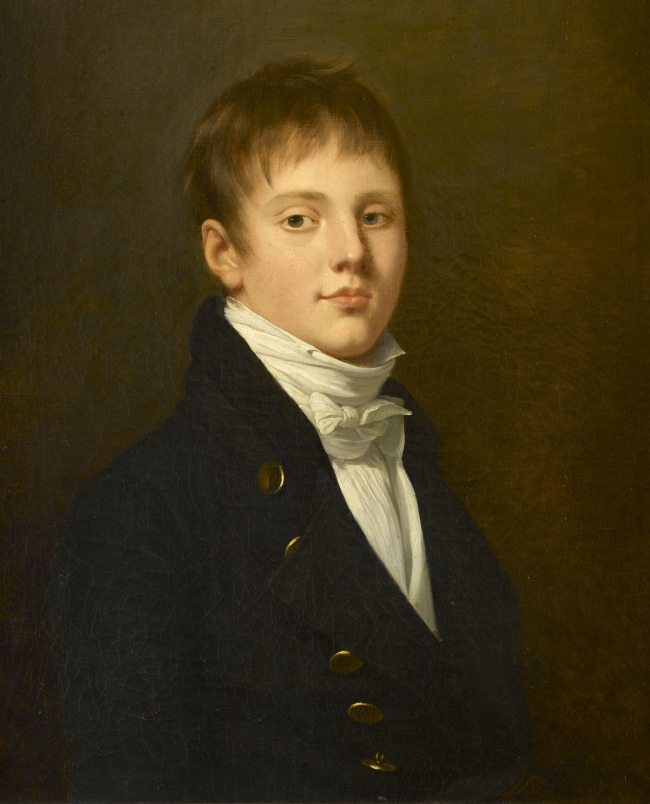
Portrait by Robert Lefèvre, 1803

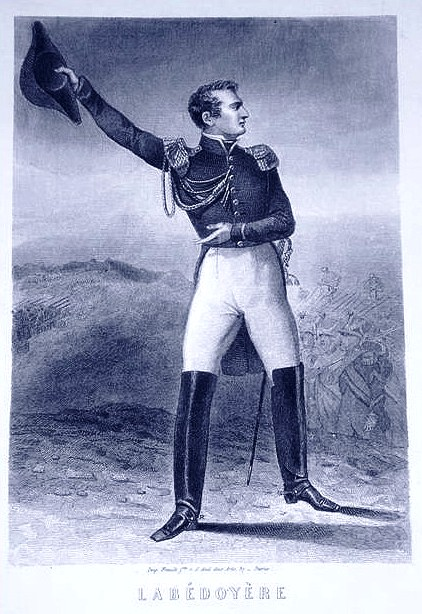

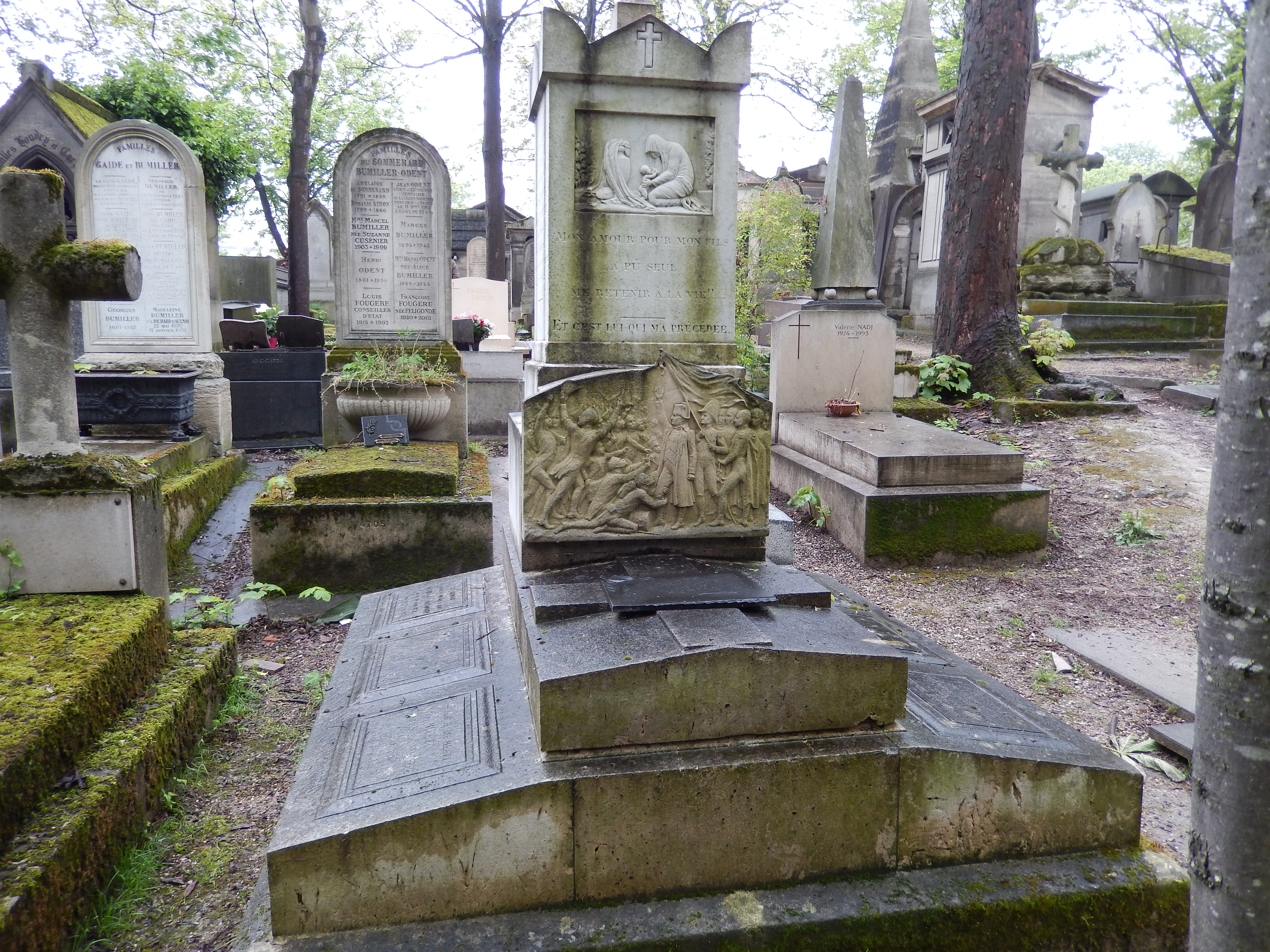
Tomb at Père Lachaise Cemetery

== See also ==
- Michael de la Bédoyère
- Guy de la Bédoyère
