= Anthony Thorold =

British bishop (1825–1895)

The Right Reverend Anthony Thorold
- Bishop of Winchester
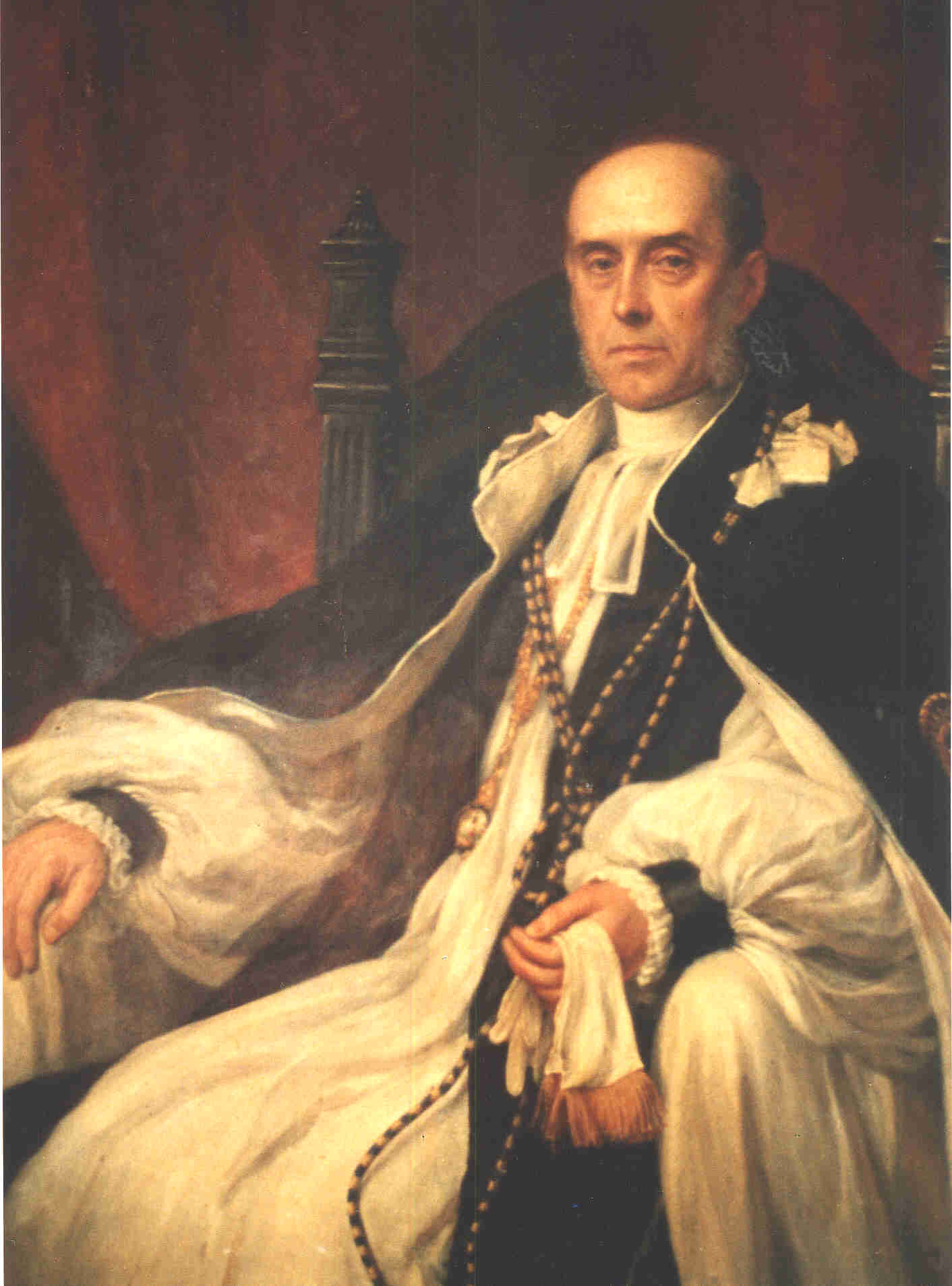
- Anthony Thorold as Lord Bishop of Winchester in a portrait now at Marston Hall, Lincolnshire
- Diocese: Winchester
- Installed: 1891
- Term ended: 1895
- Predecessor: Harold Browne
- Successor: Randall Davidson
- Other post: Bishop of Rochester

Personal details
- Born: 13 June 1825
- Died: 25 July 1895 (aged 70)
- Denomination: Church of England
- Education: The Queen's College, Oxford

Anthony Wilson Thorold (13 June 1825 – 25 July 1895) was an Anglican Bishop of Winchester in the Victorian era. The son of a Church of England priest, he also served as Bishop of Rochester. It was in that role that he travelled throughout North America and met with leaders of the Church of Jesus Christ of Latter-day Saints. While he wrote a number of devotional books, he is best remembered for having recruited Isabella Gilmore to revive the female diaconate in the Anglican Communion.

== Early life ==
Thorold was the second son of the Reverend Edward Thorold and his wife Mary (née Wilson), and grandson of Sir John Thorold, 9th Baronet (1734–1815). He was educated privately, entering The Queen's College, Oxford in 1843; he graduated B.A. 1847, M.A. 1850. He was ordained as a deacon in 1849 and as a priest in 1850. He subsequently received a D.D. by diploma in 1877.

He followed his father into a career in the Church of England. He served as vicar of St Giles in the Fields, Curzon Chapel, and St Pancras. In 1870 he was elected a member of the first London School Board, representing the Marylebone Division. In 1877 he was made Bishop of Rochester.

== Travels ==
Thorold had extensive travels, preaching in the United States in the late 19th century. During that time he visited the Church of Jesus Christ of Latter-day Saints at Salt Lake City. He recalled that on 1 September 1884, "We went round the new Mormon Tabernacle, of solid granite, very massively built out of the tithes of the people. It is only one-third finished. Then into the tabernacle now in use, tortoise shape, and capable of holding 7000 people ... we passed the great co-operative store ... and Brigham Young's houses', near which was pointed out Mr. Taylor [presumably John Taylor], a very important and able ruler in the body". Thorold went on to the Great Salt Lake and noted "There is a bathing station here, and almost all the company, gentlemen and ladies, bathed in the sea, which, from the quantity of salt, it is quite impossible to sink". He travelled on and even reached Alaska before returning home.

== Female diaconate ==
In 1886, he recruited Isabella Gilmore to revive the female diaconate in his diocese. Her initial reluctance, based on her lack of theological training and her lack of knowledge of the deaconess order, was worn down by Thorold. At the end of October 1886, she felt she received a calling during Morning Prayer. She later wrote, "it was just as if God's voice had called me, and the intense rest and joy were beyond words." Gilmore and Bishop Thorold proceeded to plan for an order of deaconesses for the Church of England where the women were to be "a curiously effective combination of nurse, social worker and amateur policemen". In 1887, Gilmore was ordained a deaconess and a training house for other woman was put in place, later to be named Gilmore House in her honour. In her nearly 20 years of service, she re-established the female diaconate in the Anglican Communion.

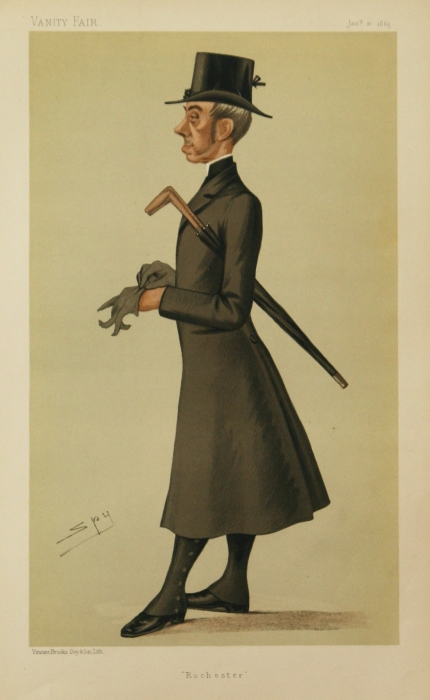
Caricature by Leslie Ward, published in 1885 in Vanity Fair

== Final years and legacy ==
He was translated to the see of Winchester in 1891 (being enthroned on March 3), where he would live out his days. A prayer survives from this time that is attributed to "Bishop A. W. Thorold, D.D., Lord Bishop of Winchester, England",

Lord of souls, who hast chosen and called me to service in Thy Church, all our trust is in Thee, for in Thee are the springs of my life. Abundantly give me of Thy Blessed Spirit, without whom nothing is strong, nothing is Holy; and use me as it shall please Thee for the glory of Thy name. Make my will patient, my conscience pure, my temper bright. Empty me of self, and fill me with the meekness of wisdom. Increase my faith, mellow my judgment, stir my zeal, enlarge my heart. Let my life enforce what my lips utter. Do Thou choose for me the work I do, and the place in which I do it; the success I win and the harvest I reap. Preserve me from jealousy and impatience; from self-will and depression. Make me faithful unto death and then give me the crown of life. All this I ask for Christ's sake. Amen.

== Works ==
Thorold wrete a number of devotional books, among them The Yoke of Christ (Isbister, London 1884), The Gospel of Christ (Isbister 1884), and The Claim of Christ on the Young (Isbister, London 1891). Shortly after his death in 1895, Charles Hare Simpkinson wrote The Life and Work of Bishop Thorold, published by Isbister in 1896. It contained quotations from Thorold's correspondence, and accounts of his travels.

== Family ==
Thorold married, firstly in 1850, Henrietta Greene, daughter of Thomas Greene MP for Lancaster. After her death in 1859, he married secondly in 1865 Emily 1865, Emily, daughter of John Labouchere. She died in 1877. She was sister of the MP Henry Labouchère.

By his first marriage Thorold had a son Edward who died young. By his second marriage he had a son Algar Labouchère Thorold (1866–1936), and two daughters, Dorothy and Sybil (later Countess de la Bédoyère). His descendants through Sybil include his grandson Michael de la Bédoyère and his great-great-grandson, the historian Guy de la Bédoyère.

Thorold's cousin Edward Trollope, was made suffragan bishop for Nottingham in 1877.

Church of England titles
Preceded by Thomas Legh Claughton	Bishop of Rochester; 1877–1891	Succeeded by Randall Davidson
Preceded by Harold Browne	Bishop of Winchester; 1891–1895	Succeeded by Randall Davidson
