= John Hatton (bishop) =

16th century Anglican priest

John Hatton was an Anglican priest in England during the early 16th century.

Hatton was educated at the University of Oxford. He was appointed a suffragan bishop to Thomas Savage, Archbishop of York in 1503 and Archdeacon of Nottingham in 1506. Hatton died on 25 April 1516, and is buried in York Minster.
