= Sarah Clark (bishop) =

British Anglican bishop (born 1965)

The Right Reverend Sarah Clark
- Bishop of Ely
- Church: Church of England
- Diocese: Diocese of Ely
- In office: 21 June 2026 to present
- Predecessor: Stephen Conway
- Previous post: Bishop of Jarrow (2019–2026)

Orders
- Ordination: 28 June 1998 (deacon); 3 July 1999 (priest)

Personal details
- Born: Sarah Elizabeth Clark; 21 April 1965 (age 61)
- Denomination: Anglicanism
- Education: Loughborough University of Technology; Keele University; St John's College, Nottingham

Sarah Elizabeth Clark (born 21 April 1965) is a British Anglican bishop. Since 21 June 2026, she has served as the 70th Bishop of Ely. Her previous posts include 2019 to 2026 service as the Bishop of Jarrow, the suffragan bishop of the Diocese of Durham in the Church of England, and prior to that 2014 to 2019 service as Archdeacon of Nottingham.

== Early life and education ==
Clark was born on 21 April 1965 in South Wales. She was educated at Abersychan School, a then grammar school in Abersychan, Pontypool. She studied sports science and history at the Loughborough University of Technology, graduating with a Bachelor of Arts (BA) degree in 1986. Her first career was as a civil servant, working in the Department of Employment from 1987 to 1995. She completed a Master of Business Administration (MBA) from Keele University in 1994.

== Ordained ministry ==
Clark trained for ordained ministry at St John's College, Nottingham, an evangelical Anglican theological college. She also studied theology and completed a Master of Arts (MA) degree in 1997. She was made a deacon at Petertide 1998 (28 June), by Patrick Harris, Bishop of Southwell, at Southwell Minster, and ordained priest the Petertide following (3 July 1999), by Alan Morgan, Bishop of Sherwood, at St Mark's, Woodthorpe.

After a curacy in Porcester, Nottingham, she was the Rector of Carlton-in-Lindrick from 2002 until 2009. She was the Area Dean of Worksop from 2006 until 2009; and the incumbent at Clifton until her appointment as Archdeacon of Nottingham.

=== Episcopal ministry ===
On 20 December 2018, it was announced that Clark was to become the next Bishop of Jarrow, the sole suffragan bishop of the Diocese of Durham. On 27 February 2019, she was consecrated a bishop by John Sentamu, Archbishop of York, during a service at York Minster.

On 27 January 2026, it was announced that she had been appointed the next Bishop of Ely. She was installed as the 70th Bishop of Ely at Ely Cathedral on 21 June 2026.

Church of England titles
Preceded by Peter Hill	Archdeacon of Nottingham; 2014 to 2019	Succeeded by Phil Williams
Preceded by Mark Bryant	Bishop of Jarrow; 2019 to 2026	Vacant
Preceded by Stephen Conway	Bishop of Ely; 2026 to present	Incumbent
