= Phil Williams (priest) =

English priest (born 1964)

Philip Andrew Williams (born 1964) has been Archdeacon of Nottingham since September 2019.

Williams was educated at the University of Sheffield and Cranmer Hall, Durham; and ordained in 1991. After curacies in Sheffield and Nottingham he was the incumbent at Lenton Abbey from 1994 to 2002 and Porchester from 2002 to 2017. He was an associate archdeacon from 2017 to 2019 and his appointment as archdeacon.

Church of England titles
Preceded by Sarah Clark	Archdeacon of Nottingham; 2019–	Succeeded by Incumbent
