= Isabella Gilmore =

English deaconess and Anglican Saint

Deaconess
- Born: 1842; London, England
- Died: 1923 (aged 80–81)
- Venerated in: Anglican Communion
- Major shrine: South transept of Southwark Cathedral
- Feast: 16 April

Isabella Gilmore (née Morris; 1842–1923) was an English churchwoman who oversaw the revival of the Deaconess Order in the Anglican Communion. Isabella served actively in the poorest parishes in South London for almost two decades and she is remembered with a commemoration in the Calendar of saints in some parts of the Anglican Communion on 16 April. She was the sister of William Morris.

== Life ==
Isabella Gilmore was born in London in 1842. Her mother was Emma Morris née Shelton, daughter of Joseph Shelton, a teacher of music in Worcester. Her father was William Morris, a partner in the firm of Sanderson & Co., bill brokers in the City of London; he died when she was 5 years old. She did have five brothers to whom she was close; one of the older ones was textile artist and socialist activist William Morris. In September 1860 she married naval officer, Arthur Gilmore, her brother William gave her away, at St Mary's Church, Leyton. She was widowed in November 1882 at the age of 40. Childless, she began training as a nurse at Guy's Hospital in London. Two years later in 1884, she took on as her own eight orphaned nieces and nephews from her late brother Rendall.

=== Female diaconate ===
In 1886, she was recruited by Anthony Thorold, the Bishop of Rochester, to revive the female diaconate in his diocese. Her initial reluctance, based on her lack of theological training and her lack of knowledge of the Deaconess Order, was worn down by the bishop. At the end of October 1886, she felt she received a calling during Morning Prayer. She later wrote, "it was just as if God’s voice had called me, and the intense rest and joy were beyond words."

Gilmore and the Bishop of Rochester proceeded to plan for an Order of Deaconesses for the Church of England where the women were to be “a curiously effective combination of nurse, social worker and amateur policeman”. In 1887, she was ordained a deaconess, actively serving the poorest parishes in south London for the next nineteen years.

A training house for other women was set up in Clapham Common Northside, later to be named Gilmore House in Isabella's honour. She lived and trained deaconesses there from 1891 until her retirement in 1906. On 24 May 2024 a commemorative blue plaque to her was unveiled there.

Gilmore, aged 64, from a portrait by C. B. Leighton.

== Legacy ==
In her nearly 20 years of service, she reestablished the female diaconate in the Anglican Communion. She had personally trained at least seven other head deaconesses for other dioceses before she died in 1923. At her memorial service, Randall Davidson, the Archbishop of Canterbury, foretold, "Some day, those who know best will be able to trace much of the origin and root of the revival of the Deaconess Order to the life, work, example and words of Isabella Gilmore. For this let us give thanks: I feel sure it is most meet and right so to do." Isabella Gilmore is remembered with a commemoration in the Calendar of saints in the Church of England and some other parts of the Anglican Communion on 16 April.

== See also ==
- Saints in Anglicanism
