= Tom Walker (priest) =

English Anglican priest and author (1933-2016)

Thomas Overington Walker (7 December 1933 – 26 May 2016) was an English Anglican priest and author.

== Biography ==
Walker was educated at Keble College, Oxford and Oak Hill Theological College and ordained in 1960. After curacies in Woking and St Leonards he was travelling secretary of the Inter-Varsity Fellowship from 1964 until 1967; Succentor at Birmingham Cathedral; and then vicar of Harborne from 1970 until his appointment as archdeacon.

He died on 26 May 2016, at the age of 82.

Church of England titles
Preceded by Clive Handford	Archdeacon of Nottingham; 1991–1996	Succeeded by Gordon Ogilvie
