= William Pearson (priest) =

English priest (1662-1715)

The Venerable William Pearson LL.D (10 August 1662 – 6 February 1715) was Archdeacon of Nottingham from 1690 to 1715.

The son of Rev John Pearson, Rector of Great Orton in Cumberland, He was educated at Queen's College, Oxford graduating MA in 1688. In 1689 he was appointed to the Prebend of Ampleford in York Minster, and the following year to the Prebend of Sariston in Southwell Minster. He also held the livings at Barton, Bolton Percy and Wheldrake. He was also Subdean of York; and Chancellor of the diocese.

In 1706 he wrote a pamphlet to the Bishop of Carlisle, concerning a curate who had been appointed churchwarden of his parish.

A collection of thirteen of his sermons was published in 1718.
