= Hugh Thomas (priest) =

British archdeacon (c. 1706–1780)

Hugh Thomas (c. 1706 – 11 July 1780) was Archdeacon of Nottingham, Dean of Ely and Master of Christ's College, Cambridge.

== Career ==
He was educated at Christ's College, Cambridge, 1724–1728 where he was awarded Bachelor of Arts (BA). He was admitted a Fellow of the College in 1728 and awarded Cambridge Master of Arts (MA Cantab) in 1731.

He was afterwards Chaplain to Matthew Hutton, Archbishop of Canterbury; and Archdeacon of Nottingham from 1748–1780.

In February 1754, he was elected Master of Christ's College, Cambridge, and awarded the degree of Doctor of Divinity (DD). In 1758 he was appointed Dean of Ely.
