= John Louth =

Archdeacon of Nottingham, England

The Venerable John Louth (also Lowth and Lowthe) (d. 5 August 1590) was Archdeacon of Nottingham, England from 1565 to 1590.

He was the son of Edmund Louth of Sawtry, Huntingdonshire.

He was educated at Winchester College and converted to Protestantism when reading the Disputation of Purgatory by John Frith.

He was educated at New College, Oxford 1538-1543 and matriculated from Corpus Christi College, Oxford 1545.

He was an eyewitness to the execution of Anne Askew in 1546. His narrative of the events was sent to John Foxe for printing in his Reminiscences.

He was appointed

- Vicar of St. James Church, Louth in 1549.
- Vicar of St Andrew's Church, Chew Magna in Somerset in 1553
- Surrogate of the Chancellor of Bristol 1559 - 1562
- Prebendary of Lincoln in 1560
- Prebendary of Lichfield in 1561
- Incumbent of the Hospital of Bath, with the Chapel of St Michael in 1562
- Chancellor of the Diocese of Gloucester 1562 - 1565
- Rector of St Lawrence's Church, Gotham in 1567
- Vicar of St Mary's Church, Nottingham from 1568 - 1572
- Prebendary of Wells Cathedral 1570
- Rector of All Saints' Church, Hawton, 1574 - 1589.
- Archdeacon of Nottingham 1565 - 1590

He was buried in St Mary's Church, Nottingham.
