= Archdeacon of Nottingham =

Church of England ecclesiastical office

The Archdeacon of Nottingham is a senior ecclesiastical officer in the Church of England Diocese of Southwell and Nottingham, who exercises supervision of clergy and has responsibility for church buildings within the Archdeaconry of Nottingham.

== History ==
The ancient Archdeaconry of Nottingham was an extensive ecclesiastical jurisdiction within the Diocese of York, England. It was created around 1100 – at which time the first archdeacons were being created across the nation – and comprised almost the whole of the county of Nottinghamshire, and was divided into the four deaneries of Nottingham, Newark, Bingham and Retford. The archdeaconry remained as a division of York diocese for more than seven centuries until it was transferred by Order in Council to the Diocese of Lincoln on 5 September 1837.

The archdeaconry was transferred once more when it became part of the new diocese of Southwell on 5 February 1884, along with the Archdeaconry of Derby. it is now one of the two archdeaconries in the renamed Diocese of Southwell and Nottingham, the other being the Archdeaconry of Newark, which was formed by Order in Council on 11 June 1912 from the northern half of the Nottingham archdeaconry.

== List of archdeacons ==
Some archdeacons without territorial titles are recorded from around the time of Thomas of Bayeux; see Archdeacon of York.

=== High Medieval ===
- bef. 1128–aft. 1121: Geoffrey (Note: Geoffrey occurs in a list with the other four archdeacons in the diocese, so his territory can be deduced as Nottingham.)
- bef. 1128–aft. 1135 (res.): Thurstan
- bef. 1140–aft. 1151: Geoffrey Turcople
- bef. 1157–aft. 1158: William (I)
- aft. 1164–aft. 1179: John
- bef. 1185–1190 (res.): Robert FitzRalph
- bef. 1194–bef. 1214: William Testard
- bef. 1218–aft. 1234: William de Bodham
- bef. 1241–?: Walter de Taney
- bef. 1248–aft. 1245: W. (probably de Taney or William {II})
- bef. 1249–aft. 1249: William (II)
- bef. 1256–aft. 1256: Peter
- bef. 1262–aft. 1272: Thomas de Wythen
- bef. 1287–bef. 1286 (d.): Henry of Skipton
- 12 March 1291 – 1310 (res.): William Pickering

=== Late Medieval ===
- 12 October 1310 – 1327 (res.): John Grandisson
- 12 July 1328–bef. 1329 (res.): Gilbert de Alberwick
- 1330–1331 (exch.): Manuel de Fieschi
- 1331–1348 (res.): Annibale Cardinal di Ceccano (Cardinal-priest of San Lorenzo in Lucina until 1333; Cardinal-bishop of Frascati thereafter)
- 1349–November 1349 (res.): John Bokyngham
- 1349–bef. 1351 (d.): Robert de Kildesby
- 13 June 1351 – 6 April 1352 (revoked): John de Bishopstone
- 13 December 1351–bef. 1353 (deprived): John de Brynkeleye (deprived)
- 9 June 1353 – 16 June 1397 (res.): Richard de Derby
- 10 August 1397 – 1415 (res.): John de Nottingham
- 21 August 1415 – 25 September 1418 (res.): John Wodham
- 27 December 1418–bef. 1419 (res.): Simon de Gaunstede
- 26 May 1419–bef. 1430 (d.): Robert Bowet
- 2 July 1430–bef. 1461 (d.): Nicholas Wymbyssh
- 27 May 1461–bef. 1476 (d.): Thomas Birom
- 28 September 1476–bef. 1499 (d.): William Worsley (also Dean of St Paul's from 1479)
- 18 August 1499–bef. 1506 (d.): Thomas Crossley
- 30 August 1506 – 25 April 1516 (d.): John Hatton, assistant bishop (titular Bishop of Negroponte)
- 8 August 1516–bef. 1528 (d.) William Fell
- 11 January 1528–bef. 1550 (d.): Cuthbert Marshall

=== Early modern ===
- 29 January 1550 – 1559 (deprived): Robert Pursglove, Bishop suffragan of Hull (aka Sylvester; deprived)
- 22 April 1560 – 27 June 1565 (res.): William Day (also a canon of St George's, Windsor from 1563)
- 30 June 1565 – 5 August 1590 (d.): John Louth
- 8 August 1590 – 1611 (res.): John King
- 1612–1627 (res.): Joseph Hall
- 11 February 1628 – 8 May 1635 (res.): Richard Baylie
- 9 May 1635–bef. 1642 (d.): William Robinson

The post was unfilled during the English Interregnum.

- 6 September 1660 – 4 July 1683 (d.): Vere Harcourt
- 13 August 1683 – 1685 (res.): Thomas White
- 23 November 1685 – 1 February 1690 (deprived): Samuel Crowbrow (deprived as a non-juror)
- 26 July 1690 – 6 February 1716 (d.): William Pearson
- 18 February 1716 – 24 August 1748 (d.): Robert Marsden
- 30 September 1748 – 11 July 1780 (d.): Hugh Thomas
- 2 August 1780 – 25 December 1810 (d.): Sir Richard Kaye, 6th Baronet (also Dean of Lincoln from 1783; styled Richard Kaye until 1789)
- 4 January 1810 – 23 March 1830 (d.): John Eyre
- 15 April 1830 – 21 April 1832 (res.): William Barrow
- 24 April 1832 – 13 August 1865 (d.): George Wilkins

On 5 September 1837, the archdeaconry was transferred to Lincoln diocese.

=== Late modern ===
- 1865–?: Henry Mackenzie (also Bishop suffragan of Nottingham, 1870–1877 (res.); died 1878)
- 1878–1894 (d.): Brough Maltby

Since 5 February 1884, the archdeaconry has been in Southwell diocese.

- 1894–1913 (ret.): John Richardson
- 1913–1915 (res.): Herbert Wild
- 1916–1936 (res.): William Conybeare (also Rector of {1916–1931} then Provost of {1931–1945} Southwell Minster)
- 1936–1944 (res.): Herbert Turner
- 1944–1949 (res.): Roger Wilson
- 1949–1960 (res.): John Phillips
- 1960–1977 (ret.): Michael Brown (afterwards archdeacon emeritus)
- 1978–1984 (res.): Roy Williamson
- 1984–1990 (res.): Clive Handford
- 1991–1996 (ret.): Tom Walker (afterwards archdeacon emeritus)
- 1996–2006 (ret.): Gordon Ogilvie
- 14 July 2007 – 25 July 2014: Peter Hill
- 26 October 2014 – 2019: Sarah Clark
- 3 July 2019 – present: Phil Williams

== Sources ==
- Greenaway, Diana E. (1999), Fasti Ecclesiae Anglicanae 1066–1300, vol. 6, pp. 43–47
- Jones, B. (1963), Fasti Ecclesiae Anglicanae 1300–1541, vol. 6, pp. 23–25
- Horn, Joyce M.; Smith, David M. (1975), Fasti Ecclesiae Anglicanae 1541–1857, vol. 4, pp. 18–20
- Horn, Joyce M.; Smith, David M. (1999), Fasti Ecclesiae Anglicanae 1541–1857, vol. 9, p. 21
- University of Nottingham, Manuscripts and Special Collections, Records of the Archdeacons of Nottingham.
