= Guy de la Bédoyère =

British historian

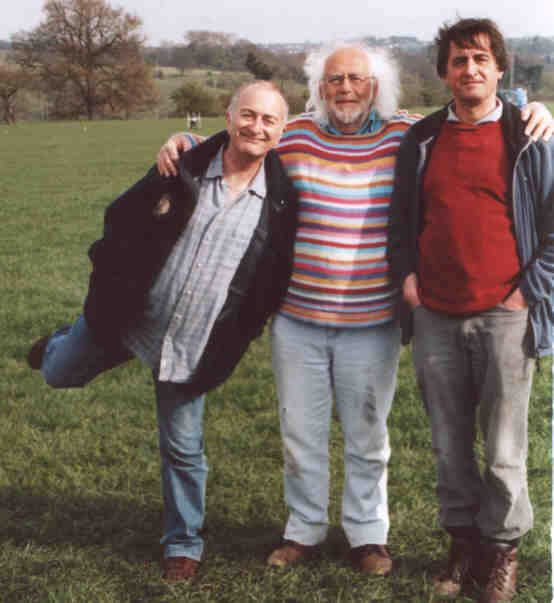
Left to right: Tony Robinson, Mick Aston and de la Bédoyère on a Time Team shoot in 2007

Guy Martyn Thorold Huchet de la Bédoyère (born November 1957) is a British historian who has published widely on Roman Britain and other subjects and appeared regularly on Time Team, an archaeological television series first broadcast on Channel 4. One of his male-line ancestors was the cousin of Charles de la Bédoyère (1786–1815), Napoleon's aide-de-camp at Waterloo in 1815.

== Family background ==
Despite his French surname, de la Bédoyère's father's ancestry is mostly English, Anglo-Irish and Scottish, with a large part belonging to the ancient Lincolnshire family of Thorold baronets, as well as the dukes of Manchester and the earls of Salisbury. His great-great-grandfather was Anthony Wilson Thorold, Bishop of Winchester. One of his male-line ancestors was the cousin of Charles de la Bédoyère (1786–1815), Napoleon's aide-de-camp at Waterloo in 1815. His grandfather, Michael de la Bédoyère, was the editor of the Catholic Herald for approximately thirty years.

Through his mother's side, de la Bédoyère is a cousin of the actress Jessica Raine, the footballer Richard Gough, and the artist Julie Gough, sharing common descent from David Storrar Gough (1885–1957).

== Life ==
Guy de la Bédoyère was born in Wimbledon on 27 November 1957, the eldest of five children. He was educated at the private King's College School, Wimbledon, and Wimbledon College. He took an archaeology and history degree at Collingwood College, Durham, in 1980, part of Durham University, with a subsidiary paper in Egyptology, a degree in modern history at the University of London in 1985, and an MA in archaeology at the Institute of Archaeology, now part of University College London, in 1987. From 1981 to 1998 he worked for most of the time as a sound engineer for BBC Radio News at Bush House and Broadcasting House in London. In 1998 he became a full-time freelance writer and broadcaster.

His special interests, apart from the Roman Empire and Roman Britain, include coinage (ancient and modern), and the writings of Samuel Pepys and John Evelyn. In 1997 he discovered that the rebel Romano-British emperor called Carausius (AD 286–293) had placed explicit reference to lines from poetry by the poet Virgil on his coins, considered a major discovery in the history of the period.

Between 2007 and 2016, De la Bédoyère gave up his full-time freelance work as a writer and broadcaster, to teach at Kesteven and Sleaford High School in Sleaford in Lincolnshire. After training on the Graduate Teacher Programme, he specialised in teaching Modern History and Classical Civilisation.

== Television appearances ==
Guy de la Bédoyère made regular appearances on Channel 4 archaeological television series Time Team as a historian, usually for episodes relating to Roman or military archaeology.

In 1999, De la Bédoyère presented a three-part series called The Romans in Britain for BBC2, produced by the Open University. In 2002 he presented Rebuilding The Past which was broadcast on the Discovery Channel in 2003 and was narrated by Terry Jones. The programme detailed the building of a Roman villa for the first time in 1600 years in Britain – Butser Ancient Farm at Chalton, Hampshire. He left the show before the completion of the project because of a number of issues with the build.

He has also taken part in a number of other television programmes including a live archaeology programme from Egypt in 2004 and a live programme from Pompeii in 2006 for Channel 5; a 2006 series on genealogy called My Famous Family, which he co-presented with Bill Oddie for UKTV History; and occasional appearances on Richard & Judy.

== Works ==
De la Bédoyère has published books on a diverse range of subjects. These include:

- a number of publications on Roman history for English Heritage;
- a book on the archaeology of aviation of the Second World War (for which he took a private pilot's licence at Biggin Hill);
- an edition of the correspondence between the diarists Samuel Pepys and John Evelyn;
- an edition of Samuel Pepys's other letters;
- The Home Front,
- The History of Computers,
- The First Polio Vaccine, World Almanac Library, Milwaukee, Wisconsin, 2006, ISBN 0-836858557.
- The Discovery of Penicillin in a series of educational science history books

He occasionally contributes to magazines, usually those concerned with history, archaeology or heritage. More recently, he has written for the Daily Telegraph, primarily concerning himself with the COVID-19 pandemic.

Selected works:

- Particular Friends: The Correspondence of Samuel Pepys and John Evelyn, Boydell (2nd edition 2005). ISBN 1843831341.
- The Diary of John Evelyn, Boydell, Woodbridge, 1995. ISBN 0851156398
- The Letters of Samuel Pepys, Boydell, Woodbridge, 2006. ISBN 184383197X.
- The Finds of Roman Britain, Batsford, London 1988. ISBN 0713460822.
- The Buildings of Roman Britain, Batsford, London 1991, now reprinted by Tempus, Stroud, 2001 as a revised second edition. ISBN 0752419064.
- A Companion to Roman Britain, Tempus, Stroud, 1999. ISBN 0752414577.
- Eagles over Britannia: The Roman Army in Britain, Tempus, Stroud, 2001. ISBN 0752419234.
- Roman Towns in Britain, Tempus, 2003. ISBN 0752429191.
- Architecture in Roman Britain, Shire Archaeology no. 66, 2002. ISBN 0747803536.
- Roman Britain: A New History, Thames & Hudson, 2006. ISBN 0500051402.
- Cities of Roman Italy, Bristol Classical Press, 2010. ISBN 9781853997280.
- Real Lives of Roman Britain, Yale University Press, 2015. ISBN 9780300207194.
- Praetorian: The Rise and Fall of Rome's Imperial Bodyguard, Yale University Press, 2017. ISBN 9780300218954.
- Domina: The Women who Made Imperial Rome, Yale University Press, 2018. ISBN 9780300254846.
- Gladius: Living, Fighting and Dying in the Roman Army, Little, Brown Book Group, 2020. ISBN 9781408712405.
- Pharaohs of the Sun: How Egypt's Despots and Dreamers Drove the Rise and Fall of Tutankhamun's Dynasty, Little, Brown Book Group, 2022. ISBN 9781408714256.
- Populus: Living and Dying in Ancient Rome, University of Chicago Press, 2024. ISBN 9780226832944.
- The Fall of Egypt and the Rise of Rome: A History of the Ptolemies, Yale University Press, 2024. ISBN 9780300275520.

== See also ==
- Michael de la Bédoyère
- Anthony Thorold
- List of Durham University people
