= Marbeck (Itter) =

River in Germany

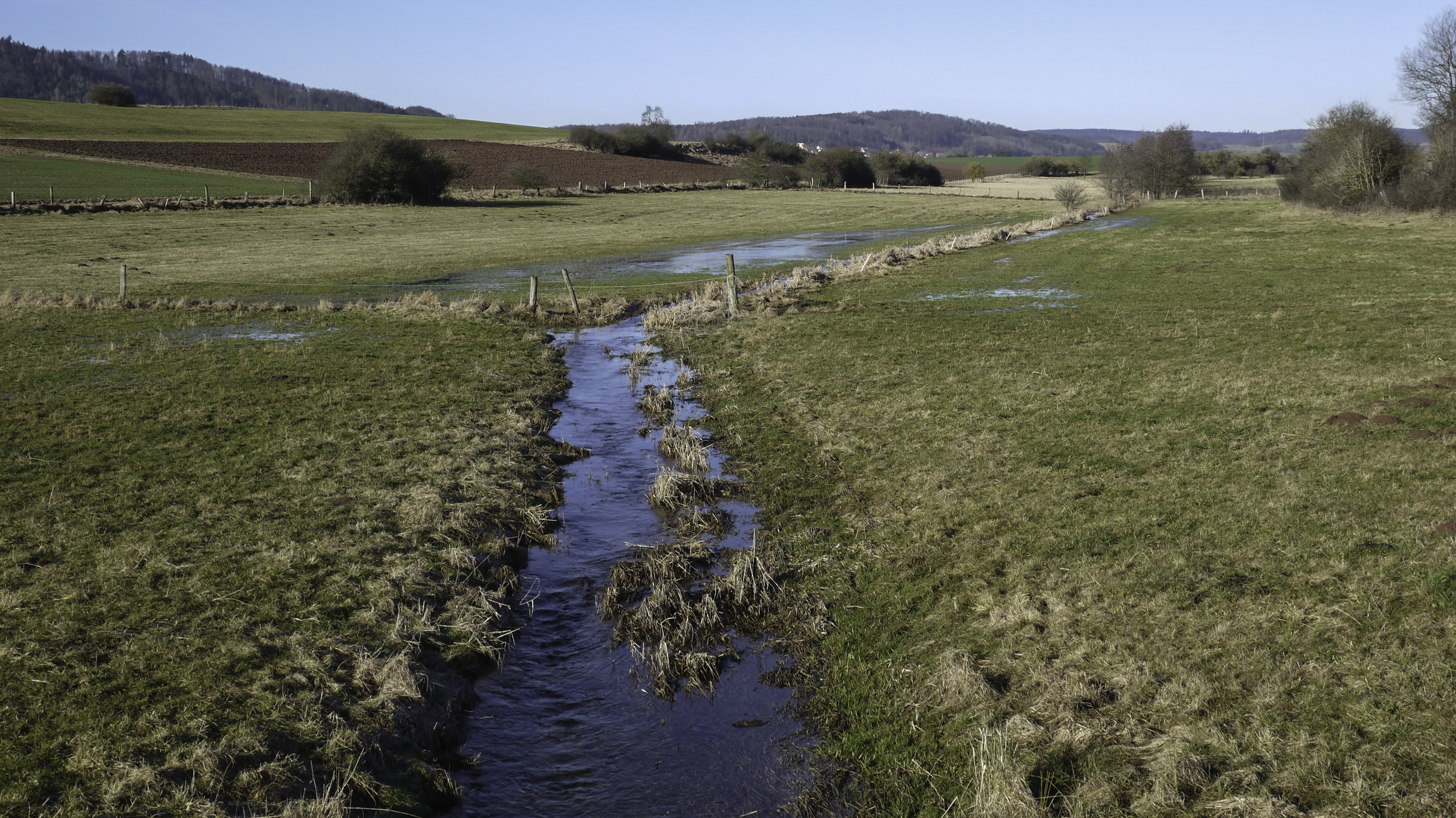

Location
- Country: Germany
- States: Hesse

Physical characteristics
- Mouth
  - location: Itter
  - coordinates: 51.2358°N 8.8787°E

Basin features
- Progression: Itter→ Eder→ Fulda→ Weser→ North Sea

Marbeck is a river of Hesse, Germany. It flows into the Itter near Vöhl-Dorfitter.

== See also ==
- List of rivers of Hesse
