= Richard Bruerne =

English churchman, college head and professor

Richard Bruerne (1519?–1565) was an English churchman, college head and professor of Hebrew.

== Life ==
A Fellow of Lincoln College, Oxford, and of Eton College, he received the degree of B.D. in 1547, and the next year was appointed Regius Professor of Hebrew in the University of Oxford. While holding this office he was one of the witnesses on behalf of Bishop Stephen Gardiner in 1551, being then about thirty-two years of age, and was present at the disputation held with Thomas Cranmer at Oxford in 1554. In 1553 he received the canonry at Christ Church, Oxford formerly held by Peter Martyr.

In May 1557 he was installed canon of Windsor. During 1556 his Hebrew lectures were taken by Peter de Soto, and others appear to have lectured in his place during the next two years. Perhaps he was engaged elsewhere, but the cessation of his lectures may have been on account of misconduct. He was alleged to have been guilty of immorality, and resigned his professorship some time before March 1559, the date of a letter in which John Jewel tells Martyr of his resignation and its cause.

The Fellows of Eton, acting without the consent of Queen Elizabeth I of England, elected him as Provost on 25 July 1561. Edmund Grindal wrote to William Cecil complaining that this should not be allowed against the royal prerogative. Archbishop Matthew Parker was directed to hold a visitation of the college, and to inquire into the election of the provost, given his reputation. The visitation was held on 9 September, and though Bruerne at first objected to the commission, alleging that it had expired, he finally resigned the provostship, receiving £10 compensation from the funds of the college. The next year he supplicated for the degree of D.D. at Oxford, but was refused. He died in April 1565, and was buried in St. George's Chapel, Windsor. At the time of his death he was receiver of Christ Church, and Thomas Sampson, the dean, told Parker that he left money to be accounted for.

Religious titles
Preceded by Peter Martyr Vermigli	Canon of Christ Church, Oxford, First Prebend; 1553–1565	Succeeded by Roger Marbeck
