= Roger Marbeck =

Roger Marbeck (1536–1605), son of organist John Marbeck, was a noted classical scholar, was appointed public orator in the University of Oxford in 1564, and in 1565 became a canon of Christ Church and was elected Provost of Oriel College; he left Oxford on account of an unfortunate marriage, and took to medicine as a profession, becoming the first registrar of the College of Physicians in London, and chief physician to Elizabeth I of England.

Religious titles
Preceded by Richard Bruerne	Canon of Christ Church, Oxford, First Prebend; 1565–1565	Succeeded by Arthur Wake
