= Michael de la Bédoyère =

English writer and editor (1900–1973)

Count Michael Anthony Maurice de la Bédoyère (1900–1973) was an English writer, editor and journalist.

== Life ==
He was educated at Stonyhurst College, Lancashire, and took a first in "Modern Greats" (PPE) at Campion Hall, Oxford University. His initial plans to become a Jesuit priest were abandoned. In 1930-1931 he lectured at the University of Minnesota. In 1934 he became editor of the Catholic Herald, a post he held until 1962. During this time he transformed it from one of limited regional appeal into a more challenging and intellectual newspaper, which often brought it into conflict with the more conservative members of the Roman Catholic Church. Circulation increased to six figures.

After he left, he founded the magazine Search. During these years he wrote a number of books, mainly biographies such as those of Lafayette (1932), George Washington (1935), St Francis of Assisi (1962), as well as theological works such as Christianity in the Market Place (1943).

During the late 1930s, de la Bédoyère's Catholic sympathies encouraged him to support in the pages of his newspaper the Nationalists led by General Franco in the Spanish Civil War. He was strongly anti-communist and believed support for the Nationalist side would hasten peace and be in the interests of Spain. However, he criticised Franco's bombing of Republican cities, saying "We deplore it because there is ground for discussing any plan that may save the lives of women and innocent children, his own country-folk, who will not forget, because Franco has set himself an extremely high ideal and as such he should do all that he can to render less inhuman an inevitable war, and because such bombing does his cause infinite harm from the point of view of world propaganda."

During the Second World War, he almost went to prison for criticising what he saw as Churchill's appeasement of the "godless" Soviet Union.

De la Bédoyère had five children by his first wife and cousin, Catherine Thorold (d. 1959) and two by his second wife, Charlotte (d. 2024). Both he and his first wife were grandchildren of Anthony Wilson Thorold, Anglican Bishop of Winchester, and were therefore first cousins to each other; their mutual great-uncle was Henry Labouchère through his sister Emily, the wife of Bishop Thorold. Michael's son Quentin de la Bédoyère who died on 1 August 2023 contributed to the Catholic Herald.

Michael's eldest grandson is the historian Guy de la Bédoyère. Martin, one of his sons by his second wife still runs Search Press, founded by his mother, Charlotte de la Bédoyère.

== Works ==
Selected works:

- Lafayette. A Revolutionary Gentleman, Jonathan Cape, London, 1933.
- George Washington. An English Judgment, Harrap, London, 1935.
- Christian Crisis, Catholic Book Club, London, 1940.
- Was it worth it, Wells? [An account of the correspondence between the author and H.G. Wells on the book "Crux Ansata" by H.G. Wells.], Paternoster Publications, London, 1943.
- No Dreamers Weak. A study of Christian realism as against visionary utopianism in avoiding another Great War and making a real peace., John Miles, London, 1945.
- The greatest Catherine; the life of Catherine Benincasa, Saint of Siena, Hollis & Carter, London, 1947.
- The Time for Action, London, 1949.
- The Life of Baron von Hügel, Dent, London 1951.
- Living Christianity, Dent, London, 1954.
- The Layman in the Church, Burns & Oates, 1955.
- Cardinal Bernard Griffin, Archbishop of Westminster, Rockliff, 1955.
- The Archbishop and the Lady. The Story of Fénelon and Madam Guyon, Collins, London, 1956.
- The Meddlesome Friar, Collins, London, 1958.
- François de Sales, Collins, London, 1960.
- Francis: a Biography of the Saint of Assisi, Harper & Row, London, 1962.
- Objections to Roman Catholicism (ed.), Constable, London, 1964.
- The Future of Catholic Christianity (ed), J.B. Lippincott Company, Philadelphia & New York, 1966
