= Champagné =

Champagné may refer to:

== People ==
- Lt.-Gen. Forbes Champagné (1754–1816), a British Army officer
- Rev. George Champagné (c. 1751–1828), an Irish clergyman
- Gen. Sir Josiah Champagné (1755–1840), a British Army officer

== Places ==
- Champagné, Sarthe, a commune in the Sarthe département
- Champagné-le-Sec, a commune in the Vienne département
- Champagné-les-Marais, a commune in the Vendée département
- Champagné-Saint-Hilaire, a commune in the Vienne département

== See also ==
- Champagne (disambiguation)
