= Thomas Oates =

Thomas Oates or Tom Oates may refer to:

- Thomas Oates (priest) (died 1623), Canon of Windsor from 1621 to 1623
- Thomas Oates (cricketer) (1875–1949), English cricketer
- Thomas Oates (colonial administrator) (1917–2015), Governor of Saint Helena from 1971 to 1976
- Tom Oates (sportswriter), American sportswriter for the Wisconsin State Journal
