= Somer =

Somer (also de Somer, van Somer) is a surname, and may refer to:

- Avo Sõmer (1934–2024), American musicologist, music theorist and composer
- Eli Somer (born 1951), Israeli professor of clinical psychology
- Gerard Somer (born 1943), Dutch football player and manager
- Hendrick de Somer (1602–c.1655), Flemish painter
- Henry Somer (c.1370–1450), English courtier and politician
- Iryna Somer (born 1970), Ukrainian journalist
- John Somer (disambiguation), several people
- Mehmet Murat Somer (born 1959), Turkish author of crime fiction
- Paul van Somer I (c.1577–1621), Flemish artist
- Pieter De Somer (1917–1985), Belgian physician and biologist
- Tarık Galip Somer (1926–1997), Turkish academic
- Yanti Somer (born 1948), Finnish actress

== See also ==
- Somers (surname)
