= Dean and canons of Windsor =

Ecclesiastical body of St George's Chapel at Windsor Castle

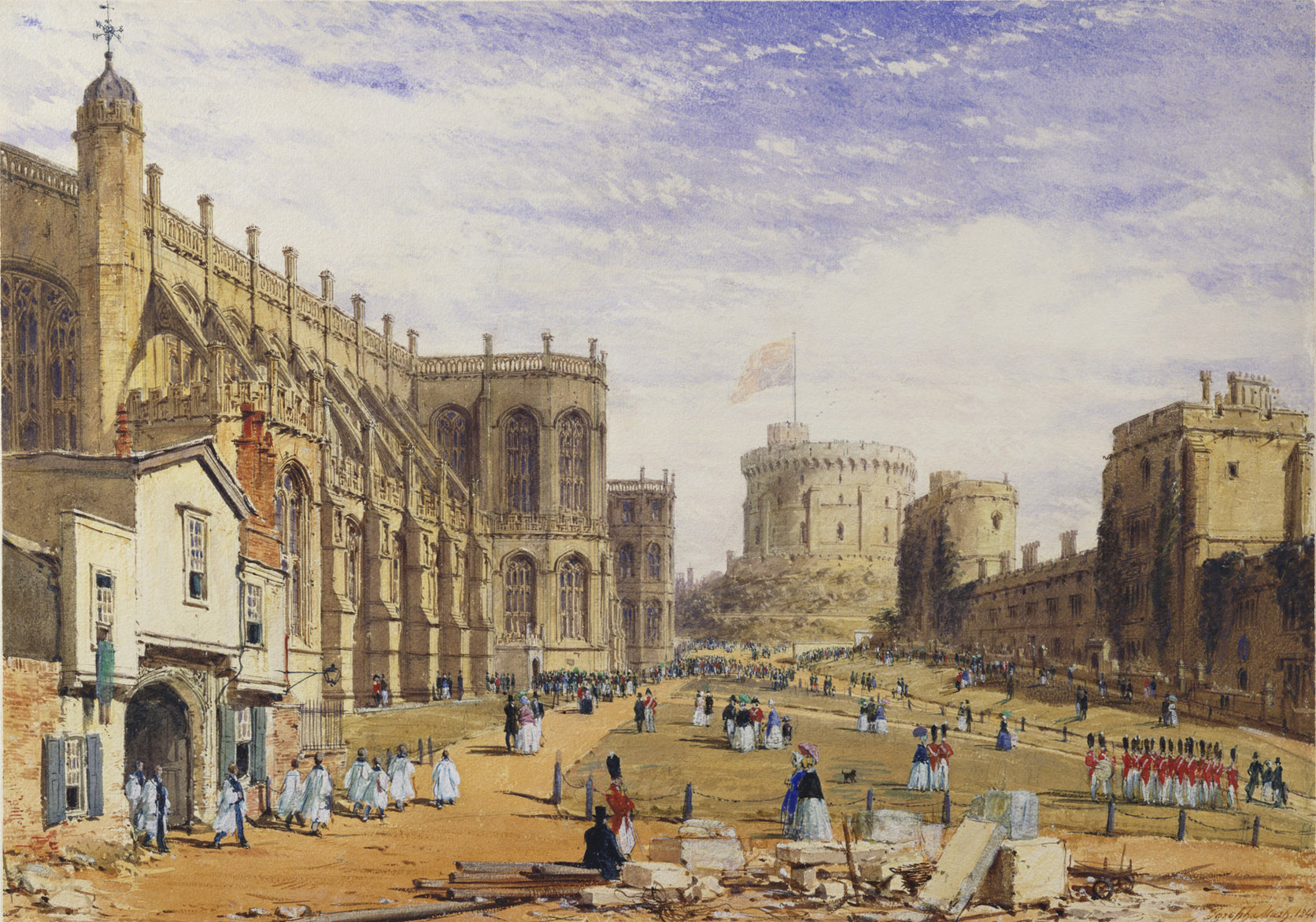
St George's Chapel at Windsor Castle, left, 1848.

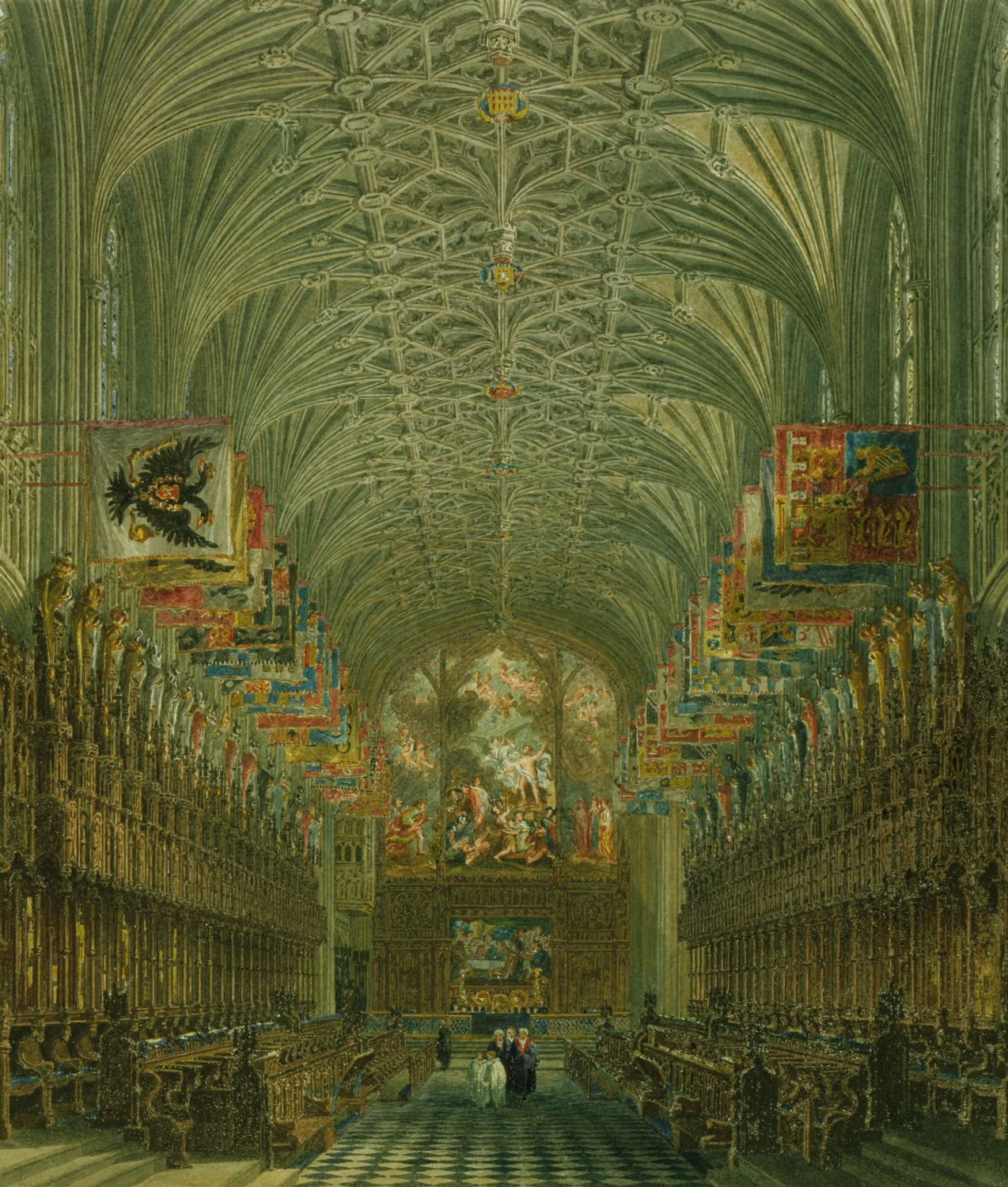
The stalls for the Dean and Canons in the chapel

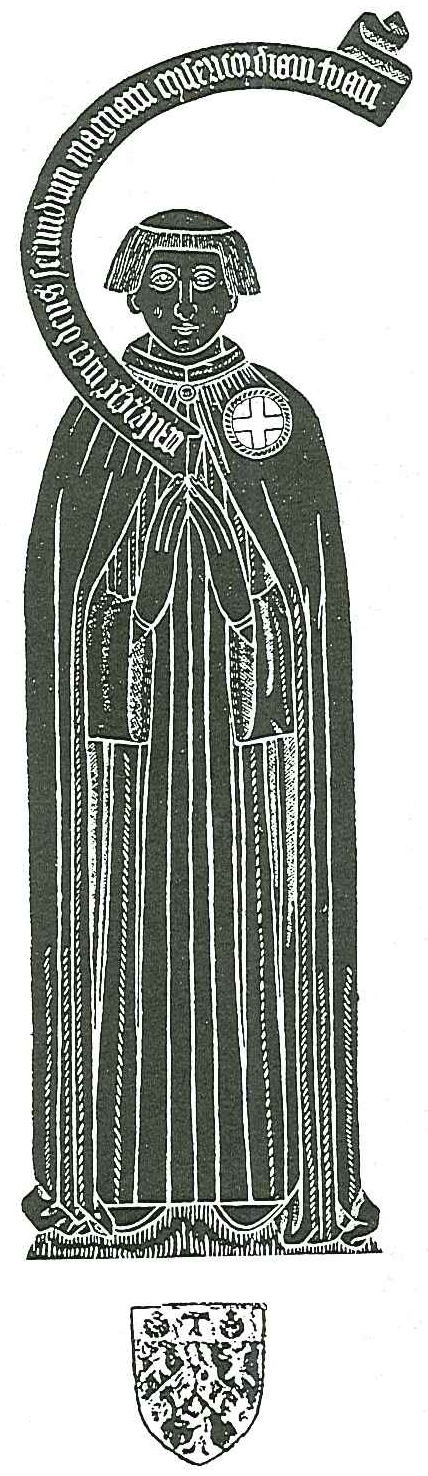
Rubbing of monumental brass in Eton College Chapel, of Roger Lupton (d.1540) with his coat-of-arms below. Lupton's hair displays the tonsure of a cleric. He wears the mantle of a Canon of Windsor (based in St George's Chapel, Windsor Castle), displaying on his left shoulder a Cross of St George within a circle

The Dean and Canons of Windsor are the ecclesiastical body of St George's Chapel at Windsor Castle.

== Foundation ==
The college of canons was established in 1348 by letters patent of King Edward III. It was formally constituted on the feast of St Andrew the Apostle, 30 November 1352, when the statutes drawn up by William Edington, bishop of Winchester, as papal delegate, were solemnly delivered to William Mugge, the warden of the college.

Accepting that the process of foundation took several years to complete, the college takes the year 1348 as its formal date of foundation.

== Costume ==
Three ancient monumental brasses survive depicting canons of Windsor, wearing the mantle of the Order of the Garter, purple in colour, with a circular badge on the left shoulder, displaying: Argent, a cross gules (a Saint George's Cross):

1. c. 1370. Roger Parkers, North Stoke, Oxfordshire (half effigy with inscription; head lost).
2. 1540. Roger Lupton, LL.D., Provost of Eton College and Canon of Windsor. Eton College Chapel (mantle worn over fur-lined cassock; no surplice).
3. 1558. Arthur Cole, S.T.B., President of Magdalen, at Magdalen College, Oxford. Showing a very ornate mantle worn over cassock and surplice.

The long cords which fasten the mantle are well represented at North Stoke and Magdalen College. In the two later examples it is gathered. On the Eton brass the mantle is fastened at the neck. The lost effigy of John Robyns, d. 1558, of which the inscription remains in St George's Chapel, may have shown him wearing the mantle. Brasses of canons of Windsor are found showing them vested in copes, without the Garter badge, as at Thurcaston, Leicestershire. (John Mershdcn, 1425), and at Harrow (Simon Marcheford, 1442). A brass was discovered in 1890 at Bennington, near Stevenage, Hertfordshire, showing a small mutilated effigy of a priest in a cope with a round badge (possibly a rose) on the left shoulder. The cope has an orphrey. This has been supposed to represent a Canon of Windsor.

== Suspension of canonries ==
Section 9 of the Ecclesiastical Commissioners Act 1840 (3 & 4 Vict. c. 113) provided for the suspension of eight of the canonries at St George's. It required that the first two vacant canonries should be suspended, the next filled, the next two suspended, the next filled, the next two suspended, the next filled, and the next two suspended.

== Current chapter ==
As of 2 September 2023:

- Dean of Windsor – Christopher Cocksworth (from November 2023)
- Vice-Dean, and Warden of St George's House – Hueston Finlay (canon since 25 September 2004 and warden since September 2005; steward 2006–2009; treasurer since 2012; Vice-Dean since before July 2017)
- Canon Precentor and Chaplain – Martin Poll (canon and chaplain since 1 October 2012 installation; precentor since before July 2017)
- Canon Steward – Nicholas Brown (since 2 October 2025 installation)

Minor Canons

Vacant

Other Canons

- Papal Confrater – Pope Leo XIV (since 23 October 2025; established by King Charles III)

== Deans of Windsor ==
See Dean of Windsor for chronological list.

== Canons of the First Stall ==
1. Hugh Whytchirche 1352–1375
2. John Landyran 1376
3. Richard de Bokelly, alias Flandreyn 1376–1377
4. William Dole 1377–1403
5. William Lane 1403–1404
6. Walter Mabeley 1404–1407
7. Robert Wolveden 1407–1412
8. Thomas Hanley 1412–1413
9. John Meresden, Mersdon or Mershden 1413–1425
10. Roger Gates 1425–1430
11. John Pye 1430–1439
12. William Brewster 1439–1465
13. Thomas Downe 1465–1479
14. John Arundel 1479–1496
15. Thomas Jane 1496–1500
16. William Cokkes 1500–1512
17. Robert Birkenshaw or Bekensall 1512–1525
18. Miles Welles or Wyllen 1526–1535
19. Simon Symonds 1535–1551
20. Richard Turner 1551–1553
21. William Este 1554–1557
22. William Pye 1557
23. John Bowles or Bockle 1557–1558
24. Edward Morecroft 1560–1580
25. John King 1580–1607
26. Mordecai (Murdoch) Alden 1607–1615
27. John King 1615–1638
28. Samuel Baker 1638–1639
29. Thomas Browne 1639–1673
30. Robert Young 1673–1716
31. William Derham 1716–1735
32. George Stephens 1735–1751
33. Balthasar Regis 1751–1757
34. John Bostock 1757–1786
35. John Fisher 1786–1803
36. William Beaumont Busby 1803–1808
37. Hon. Henry Ryder 1808–1812
38. Hon. Henry Cockayne Cust 1813–1861

Canonry of the First Stall suspended by the Act of 1840.

== Canons of the Second Stall ==
- 1. William de Polmorva 1352–1362
- 2. John Aleyn 1362–1368
- 3. Adam de Hertyngdon 1368–1380
- 4. Robert de More 1376
- 5. Walter (or William) Almaly or Almary 1380–1381
- 6. John Bouland 1381–1400
- 7. Edmund Lacey 1401–1417
- 8. John Longville 1417–1426
- 9. Alan Kirketon, or Kynton 1426–1443
- 10. Pagan (Payn) Burghill 1443–1474
- 11. Thomas Pallet 1474–1488
- 12. Richard Arnold 1488–1491
- 13. Thomas Bowde 1491–1504
- 14. Robert Honiwood 1504–1523
- 15. Richard Rawson 1523–1543
- 16. John Robins 1543–1558
- 17. Robert Iseham 1558–1560
- 18. Paul French 1560–1600
- 19. Henry Beaumont 1600–1622
- 20. Thomas Some 1622–1644
- 21. Edward Fulham 1660–1694
- 22. Maurice Vaughan 1695–1722
- 23. Peniston Booth 1722–1729
- 24. Robert Friend 1729–1737
- 25. Matthew Hutton 1737–1739
- 26. William Burchett 1739–1750
- 27. Thomas Hinton 1751–1757
- 28. John Lockman 1759–1807
- 29. Charles Digby 1808–1841

Canonry of the Second Stall suspended by the Act of 1840.

== Canons of the Third Stall ==
- 1. Richard Rothley 1352–1362
- 2. John Leek 1362–1369
- 3. Thomas de Aston 1369–1376
- 4. John Massingham 1376–1408
- 5. John Malvern 1408–1416
- 6. John Corynham, or Coringham 1416–1444
- 7. Henry Hansherd or Hansard 1444–1446
- 8. Richard Willys 1446–1467
- 9. Clement Smith 1467–1471
- 10. John Cressy 1471
- 11. William Dudley 1471 (appointed Dean in 1473)
- 12. John Seymour 1471–1501
- 13. Geoffrey Symeon 1501–1508
- 14. Richard Rawlins 1508–1523
- 15. William Tate 1523–1540
- 16. Owen Oglethorpe 1540–1554
- 17. William Denys or Devenish 1554–1559
- 18. Simon Alleyn 1559–1563
- 19. John Thompson 1563–1571
- 20. William Wickham 1571–1584
- 21. William Wilson 1584–1615
- 22. Richard Langley 1615
- 23. Oliver Lloyd 1615–1617
- 24. Richard Montague 1617–1628
- 25. David Stokes 1628–1669
- 26. Henry Wotton 1669–1671
- 27. Gregory Hascard 1671–1684
- 28. Edward Jones 1684–1737
- 29. Lord James Beauclerk 1738–1746
- 30. Frederick Cornwallis 1746–1750
- 31. Walter Harte 1750–1774
- 32. James King 1774–1776
- 33. Thomas Bray 1776–1785
- 34. Henry William Majendie 1785–1798
- 35. Samuel Goodenough 1798–1802
- 36. George Champagne 1802–1828
- 37. Richard Adolphus Musgrave 1828–1841

Canonry of the Third Stall suspended by the Act of 1840.

== Canons of the Fourth Stall ==
- 1. Roger Parker 1353–1355
- 2. Stephen Scaldeford (Shalford) alias Brunkter 1355–1378
- 3. Thomas de Lynton 1378–1387
- 4. John Notyngham 1387–1389
- 5. Thomas Haule or Hauley 1389–1399
- 6. Robert Ravendale 1399–1404
- 7. William Asshrigge 1404–1405
- 8. Geoffrey Melton 1405–1411
- 9. Henry Drayton 1411–1413
- 10. William Lochard 1413–1431
- 11. John Brydbroke 1431–1444
- 12. William Mychell 1444–1463
- 13. Leyson Geffrey 1463–1474
- 14. John Marshall 1474–1478
- 15. William Corkys 1478–1487
- 16. Thomas Fraunces 1487–1500
- 17. John Esterfield 1500–1513
- 18. Christopher Plummer 1513–1535
- 19. James Blythe 1536–1546
- 20. Henry Aglionby 1546–1554
- 21. William Saxey 1554–1566
- 22. Anthony Rushe 1566–1577
- 23. Herbert Westfaling 1577–1586
- 24. Alexander Southayke 1586–1606
- 25. John Buckeridge 1606–1628
- 26. Gilbert Primrose 1628–1642
- 27. Hugh Paulinus de Cressy 1642–1646 (not installed)
- Interregnum 1646–1660
- 28. John Lloyd 1660–1671
- 29. John Saumares 1671–1697
- 30. Samuel Pratt 1697–1723
- 31. Henry Bland 1723–1733
- 32. Hugh Lewis 1733–1742
- 33. Richard Terrick 1742–1749
- 34. Richard Newcome 1749–1755
- 35. Lord Francis Seymour 1755–1766
- 36. Thomas Hurdis 1766–1784
- 37. Folliott Herbert Walker Cornewall 1784–1793
- 38. Hon. William Stuart 1793–1800
- 39. George Heath 1800–1822
- 40. Hon. Richard Bagot 1822–1827
- 41. David Frederick Markham 1827–1853

Canonry of the Fourth Stall suspended by the Act of 1840.

== Canons of the Fifth Stall ==
- 1. Reginald Lodington 1351–1365
- 2. Stephen de Estnore 1365–1368
- 3. John Saxton 1368–1382
- 4. Nicholas Slake 1382–1394
- 5. William Spigurnell 1394–1425
- 6. John Snell 1425–1431
- 7. Thomas Damet or Dannet 1431–1436
- 8. Richard Wyot 1436–1449
- 9. John Arundel 1449–1459
- 10. Richard Bowyer 1459–1471
- 11. John Vaughan 1471–1499
- 12. Richard Payne 1499–1507
- 13. William Atkinson 1507–1509
- 14. John Chambre (Chamber) 1509–1549
- 15. Ottuell (Ottiwell) Hollinshed 1550–1554
- 16. John Browne 1554–1572
- 17. Robert Johnson 1572–1625
- 18. John King 1625–1638
- 19. William Brough 1638–1671
- 20. Peter Scot (Scott) 1671–1689
- 21. John Hern 1690–1707
- 22. Thomas Goddard 1707–1731
- 23. William George 1731–1748
- 24. Theophilus Lowe 1748–1769
- 25. Thomas Dampier 1769–1774
- 26. John James Majendie 1774–1783
- 27. Hon. George Hamilton 1783–1787
- 28. William Langford 1787–1814
- 29. Charles Proby 1814–1859
- 30. Hon. Charles Leslie Courtenay 1859–1894
- 31. Richard Gee 1894–1902
- 32. Clement Smith 1902–1921
- 33. Vacancy 1921–1974
- 34. Anthony Oakley Dyson 1974–1977
- 35. Vacancy 1977–1981
- 36. John David Treadgold 1981–1989
- 37. Michael Anthony Moxon 1990–1998
- 38. Barry Thompson 1998–2004
- 39. Hueston Edward Finlay 2004–2025

== Canons of the Sixth Stall ==
- 1. Reginald Garderobe 1353–1354
- 2. Richard de Bokelly, alias Flanderyn 1354–1376 (then Canon of the First Stall)
- 3. Richard Shawe 1376–1403
- 4. Richard Prentys 1403–1404
- 5. John Ailleston or Ayleston 1404–1405
- 6. John Exton 1405–1430
- 7. John Depeden 1430–1460
- 8. James Goldwell 1460–1472
- 9. Thomas Danett 1472–1481
- 10. Robert Morton 1481–1486
- 11. John Stokes 1486–1503
- 12. William Butler 1503–1519
- 13. John Longland 1519–1520
- 14. Thomas Magnus 1520–1547
- 15. Richard Cox 1548–1553
- 16. William Chedsey 1554–1559
- 17. George Whitehorne 1559–1565
- 18. Edmund Freke 1565–1572
- 19. Hugh Blythe 1572–1610
- 20. Thomas Frith 1610–1631
- 21. Daniel Collins 1631–1648
- Interregnum 1648–1660
- 22. William Chamberlain 1660–1666
- 23. Richard Milward 1666–1680
- 24. Thomas Sprat 1681–1684
- 25. John Wickart 1684–1722
- 26. Richard Sleech 1722–1730
- 27. Michael Stanhope 1730–1737
- 28. John Ewer 1738–1774
- 29. John Hallam 1775–1811
- 30. Hon. Richard Bruce Stopford 1812–1844
- 31. Frederick Anson 1845–1885
- 32. John Neale Dalton 1885–1931
- 33. Harry William Blackburne 1931–1934
- 34. Arthur Stafford Crawley 1934–1948
- 35. Edward Malcolm Venables 1948–1957
- 36. James Atherton Fisher 1958–1978
- 37. David John Burgess 1978–1987
- 38. Alan Alfred Coldwells 1987–1995
- 39. Laurence Gunner 1996–2006
- 40. James Woodward 2009-2015
- 41. Mark Powell 2016–2025
- 42. Nick Brown 2025–

== Canons of the Seventh Stall ==
- 1. Robert Burnham (Bernham) 1351–1362
- 2. Hugh de Briddeham 1363–1372
- 3. Richard Raundes (Randes) 1372–1400
- 4. Richard Kingston (Kyngeston) 1400–1402
- 5. Henry Spicer (Spisour) 1402–1437
- 6. John Kette 1437–1452
- 7. John Hore 1452–1474
- 8. Edmund Audley 1474–1480
- 9. Oliver Dynham (Denham) 1480–1500
- 10. Roger Lupton 1500–1540
- 11. John London 1540–1543
- 12. Francis Mallett 1543–1570
- 13. Roger Browne 1571–1601
- 14. John Chamber 1601–1604
- 15. Richard Field 1604–1616
- 16. Edmund Wilson 1616–1617
- 17. Godfrey Goodman 1617–1656
- Interregnum 1656–1660
- 18. George Hall 1660–1662
- 19. Henry Carpenter 1662
- 20. Peter Mews 1662–1673
- 21. Thomas Doughty 1673–1701
- 22. George Verney, 12th Baron Willoughby de Broke, 1701–1714
- 23. John Pelling 1715–1750
- 24. John Fulham 1750–1777
- 25. Anthony Shepherd 1777–1796
- 26. Thomas Powys 1796–1797
- 27. Edward Northey 1797–1828
- 28. William Canning 1828–1860

Canonry of the Seventh Stall suspended by the Act of 1840.

== Canons of the Eighth Stall ==
- 1. Whitecroft or Wythecroft 1353–1361
- 2. William de Mulsho (Moulsoe) 1361–1368
- 3. Adam de Hertyngdon (Hartington) 1368
- 4. Richard de Hankedon or Launceston 1368–1379
- 5. John Prust or Prest 1379–1403
- 6. Roger Redeburne 1403–1406
- 7. John Eston 1406–1422
- 8. Peter de Alcobasse 1422–1427
- 9. Thomas Southwell 1428–1431
- 10. William Bonetemps 1431–1442
- 11. Nicholas Sturgeon 1442–1454
- 12. William Sharpe 1454–1455
- 13. John Kirkeby or Kerby 1455–1457
- 14. John Wygryme 1457–1468
- 15. Robert Wodmanston 1468–1469
- 16. Baldwin Hyde 1469–1472
- 17. David Hopton 1472–1492
- 18. Christopher Urswick 1492–1496
- 19. Richard Nix (Nykke) 1497–1501
- 20. Thomas Hobbs 1502–1507
- 21. Robert Fisher 1509–1510
- 22. Thomas Wolsey 1511–1514
- 23. Geoffrey Wren 1514–1527
- 24. Robert Shorton (or Shurton) 1527–1535
- 25. Simon Haynes 1535–1552
- 26. John Somer 1554–1573
- 27. John Wolward 1574–1598
- 28. Charles Sonibancke 1598–1638
- 29. James Rowlandson 1638–1639
- 30. John Hales 1639–1656 (ejected 1642)
- Interregnum 1656–1660
- 31. Anthony Hawles 1660–1664
- 32. John Durell 1664–1677
- 33. Richard Meggot 1677–1692
- 34. Thomas Manningham 1693–1709
- 35. John Mandevile 1709–1722
- 36. Nathaniel Marshall 1722–1730
- 37. Robert Tyrwhit 1730–1472
- 38. Edmund Gibson 1742–1746
- 39. William Gibson 1746–1754
- 40. Richard Blacow 1754–1760
- 41. Edward Barnard 1760–1781
- 42. Jonathan Davies 1782–1791
- 43. William Cookson 1792–1820
- 44. John Keate 1820–1852

Canonry of the Eighth Stall suspended by the Act of 1840.

== Canons of the Ninth Stall ==
- 1. John de Storteford 1352–1353
- 2. Edmund Clovil 1353–1387
- 3. John Drake 1387–1391
- 4. William Falewell 1391–1397
- 5. Thomas Marton 1397–1407
- 6. Simon Marcheford (Marchand) 1407–1441
- 7. William Walesby 1441–1450
- 8. Richard Andrew 1450–1455
- 9. William Harmer (Hermer) 1455–1473
- 10. John Coryngdon 1473–1476
- 11. John Dunmow (Dunmoe or Dumoe) 1476–1488
- 12. Richard Surland 1488–1509
- 13. James Denton 1509–1533
- 14. Richard Wolman 1533–1537
- 15. Richard Arche 1538–1553
- 16. William Horwood 1554–1555
- 17. Thomas Rawe 1555–1556
- 18. Richard Bruerne (Brewarne) 1557–1563
- 19. William Day 1563–1572
- 20. William King 1572–1590
- 21. Erasmus Webb 1590–1614
- 22. Thomas Sheafe 1614–1639
- 23. John Pocklington 1639–1641
- 24. Herbert Croft 1641–1662
- 25. John Heaver 1662–1670
- 26. Thomas Vyner 1670–1673
- 27. Isaac Vossius 1673–1689
- 28. John Mesnard (Maynard) 1689–1727
- 29. Daniel Waterland 1727–1740
- 30. John Fountayne 1741–1748
- 31. Richard Wilmot 1748–1772
- 32. Philip Duval 1772–1808
- 33. Joseph Goodall 1808–1840
- 34. Lord Wriothesley Russell 1840–1886
- 35. Philip Frank Eliot 1886–1891
- 36. Constantine Charles Henry Phipps, 3rd Marquis of Normanby 1891–1907
- 37. Edgar Sheppard 1907–1921
- 38. Samuel Mumford Taylor 1921–1929
- 39. Anthony Charles Deane 1929–1946
- 40. Duncan Armytage 1947–1954
- 41. Charles Ritchie 1954–1958
- 42. Robert Henry Hawkins 1958–1970
- 43. Stephen Edmund Verney 1970–1977
- 44. Derek Ian Tennent Eastman 1977–1985
- 45. Derek M Stanesby 1985–1997
- 46. John Anthony Ovenden 1998–2012
- 47. Martin George Poll 2012–

== Canons of the Tenth Stall ==
- 1. Robert Shutlingdon 1352–1353
- 2. John de Newbery 1353–1355
- 3. Henry Warner, alias Blunt 1355–1368
- 4. John Aleyn 1368–1373
- 5. Richard Postell 1373–1400
- 6. Robert Gough (Gowe) 1400–1432
- 7. William Brewster 1432–1437
- 8. Robert Thurgarton 1437–1438
- 9. John Howden 1438–1449
- 10. Thomas Passhe 1449–1489
- 11. William Creton (Cretyng) 1489–1519
- 12. Richard Sydnor 1519–1534
- 13. Robert Aldrich (Aldridge) 1534–1537
- 14. Henry Williams 1537–1554
- 15. Thomas Slythurst 1554–1559
- 16. Henry Ryley 1560–1586
- 17. William Harrison 1586–1593
- 18. Thomas White 1593–1624
- 19. Nathaniel Giles 1624–1644
- Interregnum 1644–1660
- 20. George Evans 1660–1702
- 21. William Fleetwood 1702–1708
- 22. John Adams 1708–1720
- 23. William Wade 1720–1733
- 24. Edmund Marten (Martin) 1733–1751
- 25. Erasmus Saunders 1751–1756
- 26. James Yorke 1756–1762
- 27. Robert Hort 1762–1773
- 28. William Buller 1773–1784
- 29. Edward Wilson 1784–1804
- 30. William Long 1804–1835

Canonry of the Tenth Stall suspended by the Act of 1840.

== Canons of the Eleventh Stall ==
- 1. John Northampton (Norhampton) 1352–1355
- 2. Thomas Madefray 1355–1375
- 3. Richard Mitford (Medeford) 1375–1381 and 1381–1390
- 4. William de Pakyngton 1381
- 5. Richard Feld (Atfeld) 1390–1401
- 6. William Gyloth (Gillot) 1401–1428
- 7. Robert Felton 1428–1432
- 8. Robert Allerton 1432–1437
- 9. Henry Hanslap (Hanslope) 1437–1452
- 10. Roger Misterton 1452–1469
- 11. Alexander Lee (Leigh) 1469–1480
- 12. Oliver King 1480–1503
- 13. William Atwater 1504–1514
- 14. James Malett 1514–1543
- 15. Arthur Cole 1543–1558
- 16. Edmund Johnson 1560
- 17. Richard Ryve (Reve) 1560–1594
- 18. Alexander Nowell 1594–1602
- 19. Edmund Nuttall 1602–1616
- 20. Thomas Horne 1616–1636
- 21. Thomas Howell 1636–1644
- 22. Ralph Brideoake 1660–1678
- 23. John Rosewell 1678–1684
- 24. William Cave 1684–1713
- 25. Andrew Snape 1713–1742
- 26. Samuel Haynes 1743–1752
- 27. Hon. Frederick Keppel 1754–1762
- 28. John Douglas 1762–1776
- 29. Hon. Shute Barrington 1776–1782
- 30. Frederick Dodsworth 1782–1821
- 31. James Stanier Clarke 1821–1834
- 32. Edward Moore 1834–1876
- 33. Hugh Pearson 1876–1882
- 34. William Boyd Carpenter 1882–1884
- 35. Edward Capel Cure 1884–1890
- 36. Alfred Barry 1891–1910
- 37. Hon. Leonard Francis Tyrwhitt 1910–1921
- 38. Alexander Nairne 1921–1936
- 39. Sidney Leslie Ollard 1936–1948
- 40. Alexander Roper Vidler 1948–1956
- 41. Geoffrey Bryan Bentley 1957–1982
- 42. John Austin White, CVO 1982–2012

== Canons of the Twelfth Stall ==
- 1. Walter Nothurst 1353–1360
- 2. John Loryng (Lorenges, Lothereyn) 1360–1387
- 3. Thomas Butiller (Boteler) 1387–1389 (appointed Dean 1389)
- 4. John Boor 1389–1402
- 5. Thomas More 1402–1422
- 6. Thomas Duryche 1422–1435
- 7. Thomas Lisieux (Lyseux or Lysures) 1435–1442
- 8. John Drury (Drewery, alias Salisbury) 1442–1446
- 9. John Bury 1446–1472
- 10. William Towres (Towrys, Tours) 1472–1485
- 11. Thomas Hutton 1485–1487
- 12. John Baily (Baylie) 1488–1495
- 13. Edward Willoughby 1495–1508
- 14. John Oxenbridge 1509–1522
- 15. Gamaliel Clifton 1522–1541
- 16. Anthony Barker 1541–1551
- 17. Nicholas Udall 1551–1554
- 18. William Ermested 1554–1558
- 19. George Mason 1560–1562
- 20. William Harward 1562–1589
- 21. Robert (Richard) Chaloner 1589–1621
- 22. Thomas Oates 1621–1623
- 23. John Elly (Ellis) 1623–1639
- 24. George Gillingham 1639–1668
- 25. John Butler 1669–1682
- 26. John Barrow 1682–1684
- 27. John Fitzwilliams 1685–1691
- 28. John Hartcliffe 1691–1712
- 29. Francis Brown 1713–1724
- 30. James Barclay 1724–1750
- 31. John Sumner 1751–1772
- 32. John Foster 1772–1773
- 33. Roger Mostyn 1774–1775
- 34. Montague North 1775–1779
- 35. William Arnald 1779–1802
- 36. Hon. Edward Legge 1802–1805
- 37. Hon. Jacob Marsham 1805–1840

Canonry of the Twelfth Stall suspended by the Act of 1840.
