= Robert Burnham =

Robert Burnham may refer to:

- Robert Burnham Jr. (1931–1993), American astronomer
- Robert Burnham (priest) (died 1362), canon of Windsor
- Bo Burnham (Robert Pickering Burnham, born 1990), American comedian and singer
- Robert F. Burnham (1913–1969), U.S. Air Force general
