= Anthony Barker =

Anthony Barker may refer to:

- Anthony Barker (priest) (died 1551), Canon of Windsor
- Sir Anthony Barker (MP) (c. 1557/8–1630), English politician, MP for Reading in 1621
- Anthony Raine Barker (1880–1963), British artist
- Tony Barker (born 1968), American football linebacker
