= John Saxton =

John Saxton may refer to:

- John Saxton (physicist) (1914–1980), British physicist
- John Saxton (priest) (d. 1382), canon of Windsor
- John Saxton (settler) (1807–1866), New Zealand diarist and early Nelson settler

== See also ==
- John Sexton (disambiguation)
