= John Exton =

John Exton may refer to:

- John Exton (lawyer) (c. 1600–c. 1665), English admiralty lawyer
- John Exton (composer) (1933–2009), British composer of classical music
- John Exton (priest) (died 1430), Canon of Windsor
