= Henry Hansherd =

English priest (died 1446)

Henry Hanshard (also Hansard) (d. 1446) was a Canon of Windsor from 1444 to 1446.

== Career ==
He was appointed:

- Rector of St Margaret, New Fish Street 1428 - 1436
- Rector of St Mary Somerset, London until 1415
- Rector of Clifton Keynes

He was appointed to the third stall in St George's Chapel, Windsor Castle in 1444 and held the canonry until 1446.
