= William Langford =

William Langford may refer to:

- William Langford (rower) (1896–1973), Canadian rower
- William Langford (cricketer) (1875–1957), English cricketer
- William Langford (MP), Member of Parliament (MP) for Berkshire
- William Langford (priest) (died 1814), Canon of Windsor
- William Langford (golf) (1887–1977), golf course designer and civil engineer
- Hasaan Ibn Ali (musician) (1931–1980), jazz pianist, whose birth name may have been William Henry Langford
