= Henry Drayton =

Henry Drayton may refer to:

- Henry Lumley Drayton (1869–1950), Canadian lawyer and politician
- Henry Drayton (priest), Canon of Windsor, 1411–1413
- Henry Shipton Drayton (1840–1923), American physician and phrenologist
