= Champaigne =

Champaigne may refer to:

- Champagne, a French sparkling wine
- Count of Champaigne, a French noble title
- Jean Baptiste de Champaigne (1631–1681), Flemish-born French Baroque painter
- Philippe de Champaigne (1602–1674), Flemish-born French Baroque painter
- Naïka Champaïgne (born 1995), Haitian-Canadian musician

== See also ==
- Champagne (disambiguation)
