= Thomas Hinton =

Thomas Hinton may refer to:

- Thomas Hinton (politician), English politician
- Thomas Hinton (printer), English printer
- Thomas Hinton (priest), English priest
- Tom Hinton, Canadian Football League player
