= Geoffrey Wren =

Geoffrey Wren (died 5 April 1527) was a Canon of Windsor from 1514 to 1527

== Career ==
He was appointed:

- Vicar of Brantingham 1486 - 1496
- Rector of St John the Evangelist's Church, Carlton in Lindrick 1501
- Rector of Boldon
- Master of Sherburn Hospital
- Rector of All Saints Church, Loughborough 1509 - 1527
- Rector of St Margaret, New Fish Street
- Prebendary of York 1508
- Prebendary of Howden 1510
- Prebendary of Corborough in Lichfield 1512
- Clerk of the Closet 1510

He was appointed to the eighth stall in St George's Chapel, Windsor Castle in 1514 and held the canonry until 1527.
