= Edmund Nuttall =

Edmund Nuttall may refer to:

- Sir Edmund Nuttall, 1st Baronet, British civil engineer, head of Edmund Nuttall Limited
- Edmund Nuttall (priest), Canon of Windsor
- Edmund Nuttall Limited, now BAM Nuttall
