= Thomas Horne =

Thomas Horne may refer to:

- Thomas Hartwell Horne (1780–1862), English theologian and librarian
- Thomas Horne (politician) (1800–1870), Tasmanian judge and politician
- Thomas Horne (priest) (died 1636), Anglican priest, Canon of Windsor
- Tom Horne (born 1945), Canadian-American attorney, politician, and Republican Party activist
- Tom Horne (American football), American football coach

== See also ==
- Thomas Horn (disambiguation)
- Thomas Van Horne (1782–1841), federal land register and Ohio state senator
