= Mesnard =

Mesnard is a surname. Notable people with the surname include:

- George Mesnard Parsons (1890–1963), English brewer
- Isabelle Mesnard (born 1967), French politician
- J. D. Mesnard (born 1980), American politician
- John Mesnard (died 1727), English priest
- Pierre Mesnard (1900–1969), French philosopher

== See also ==
- Mesnard-la-Barotière
