= Erasmus Saunders =

Erasmus Saunders may refer to:

- Erasmus Saunders (priest, died 1724), Welsh priest and writer
- Erasmus Saunders (priest, died 1775), his son, Canon of Windsor, 1751–1756
