= Edmund Wilson (physician) =

English canon and physician (1583-1633)

Edmund Wilson (1583 – September 1633) was a Canon of Windsor from 1616 to 1617 and a physician.

== Family ==
He was the son of William Wilson, another Canon of Windsor.

== Career ==
He was educated at Eton College and King's College, Cambridge where he graduated BA in 1601, MA in 1606, MD in 1613.

He was appointed Fellow of the Royal College of Physicians in 1615 and practised as a physician in Windsor and London.

He was appointed to the seventh stall in St George's Chapel, Windsor Castle in 1616 and held the canonry until 1617 when he was deprived of it for not having been ordained priest within a year of his installation.
