= John Sexton (disambiguation) =

John Sexton was President of New York University.

John Sexton or Jack Sexton may also refer to:

- John Sexton (photographer) (born 1953), American photographer
- John Sexton (MP for Canterbury), member of parliament (MP) for Canterbury, 1393-1407
- John Henry Sexton (1863–1954), Baptist minister in South Australia
- John W. Sexton (born 1958), Irish poet
- John Sexton (producer), Australian film producer
- John Sexton & Co, grocer
- John Sexton (rugby union) (born 1963), Irish rugby player
- Johnny Sexton (born 1985), Irish rugby player
- Jack Sexton (footballer, born 1907) (1907–1935), Australian rules footballer
- Jack Sexton (footballer, born 1925) (1925–2014), Australian rules footballer
- Jack Sexton (rugby union) (born 2001), New Zealand rugby union player

== See also ==
- John Saxton (disambiguation)
