= Eston (disambiguation) =

Eston is a town in North Yorkshire, England.

Eston may also refer to:

- Eston (name), lists of people with the given name or surname
- Eston, Saskatchewan, Canada, a town
  - Eston College, a private Christian post-secondary school
- Eston railway station, Eston, North Yorkshire
- Eston, original name of South Bank railway station (England), North Yorkshire
- Eston United F.C., a defunct football club from Eston, North Yorkshire
- Eston, a trade name for Quinestrol
- Eston (guitars). a house brand of Rose Music Australia
