= Whitehorn =

Whitehorn or Whitehorne may refer to:

== Places ==
- Whitehorn, Calgary, a neighbourhood in Calgary, Alberta, Canada
- Whitehorn Mountain (Alberta), Alberta, Canada
- Whitehorn Mountain (British Columbia), peak in eastern British Columbia, Canada

== Other ==
- Whitehorn (surname), includes a list of people with the surnames Whitehorn and Whitehorne
- Whitehorn or Finnbhennach, stud bull owned by king Ailill of Connacht in Irish mythology
- Whitehorn Public School, elementary school in Peel District School Board in Mississauga, Ontario, Canada
- Whitehorn station, light rail station in Calgary, Canada
- Whitehorne House Museum, house museum in Newport, Rhode Island, U.S.
- 144907 Whitehorne, minor planet
