= George Champagné =

Anglican clergyman and Canon of Windsor

Canon Rev. George Champagné

Canon of Windsor
- In office 1808–1828
- Preceded by: Samuel Goodenough
- Succeeded by: Richard Adolphus Musgrave

Personal details
- Born: c. 1751
- Died: 26 October 1828
- Spouse: None known
- Relations: Forbes Champagné (brother); Josiah Champagné (brother)
- Parent(s): Arthur de Robillard Champagné; Marianne Hamon
- Education: Trinity College, Dublin

Canon Rev. George Champagné (c. 1751 – 26 October 1828) was an Anglican clergyman who was Canon of Windsor from 1802–28.

== Early life ==
Champagné was born into a family of French Huguenot exiles who established themselves in Ireland. He was the eldest son of the Very Rev. Arthur de Robillard Champagné, Dean of Clonmacnoise, and Marianne Hamon, daughter of Colonel Isaac Hamon. His grandmother was Jane Forbes, daughter of Arthur Forbes - 2nd Earl Granard. He had three brothers: Lt.-Gen. Forbes Champagné; Rev. Arthur Champagné, vicar of Castlelyons; and Gen. Sir Josiah Champagné. He had six sisters including Jane (wife of the Earl of Uxbridge), Henrietta (wife of Sir Erasmus Dixon Borrowes, 6th Baronet), and Marianne (wife of Sir Charles des Voeux, 1st Baronet).

His paternal great-grandfather, the Chevalier Josias de Robillard, Seigneur de Champagné de Torxé, Saintonge, fled France after the 1685 Edict of Fontainebleau for Holland, where he joined William of Orange's army. He married Marie de la Rochefoucauld of the noble house of the same name. Their daughter Susanne married Henri de la Motte-Fouqué, baron de Saint-Seurin et de Tonnay-Boutonne, and was mother of Heinrich August de la Motte Fouqué. Their eldest son, Josias de Robillard, Champagné's grandfather, distinguished himself at a young age in service of Major-General Isaac de Monceau de la Melonière, who commanded a regiment of exiles in William's army during the Irish campaigns.

Champagné was educated at Trinity College, Dublin receiving his M.A. in the spring of 1773.

== Career ==
He served as the Vicar of Stoke, Warwickshire (1777–1785), followed by Vicar of Nuneaton (1785–1802), and the Vicar of Twickenham (1802–18). Champagné was appointed to the third stall in St George's Chapel, Windsor Castle in 1802, a position he held until 1828.

In 1818, he gave the Dean and Canons some shares in the South Sea Company to be used as an endowment to purchase clothes or books amongst the pupils of the National School at Windsor. The endowment is still awarded and is known as the Champagne Gift.

== Personal life ==
Champagné died on 26 October 1828.
