= Richard Musgrave =

Richard Musgrave may refer to:

- Richard Musgrave (economist) (1910–2007), American economist of German heritage
- Richard Musgrave (died 1555) (1524–1555), MP for Cumberland
- Sir Richard Musgrave, 1st Baronet (1535–1615), English politician
- Sir Richard Musgrave, 1st Baronet, of Tourin (1757–1818), Irish politician and writer
- Sir Richard Musgrave, 3rd Baronet, of Hayton Castle (c1675–1711), MP for Cumberland 1701 and 1702–08
- Sir Richard Musgrave, 3rd Baronet, of Tourin (1790–1859), Irish politician, MP for County Waterford 1831–32 and 1835–37
- Sir Richard Musgrave, 11th Baronet (1838–1881), English politician
- Richard Adolphus Musgrave (died 1841), English clergyman, Canon of Windsor

== See also ==
- Musgrave (surname)
- Musgrave baronets
