= John Somer =

John Somer may refer to:

- John Somer (astronomer) (fl. 1380), English astronomer
- John Somer (canon) (died 1573), English clergy
- John Somer (footballer) (1891–1939), Australian rules footballer
