= Morecroft =

Morecroft is a surname. Notable people with the surname include:

- Edward Morecroft (died 1580), Canon of Windsor
- Lauren Morecroft (born 1987), Australian rules footballer
- Richard Morecroft (1956–2026), English-born Australian television presenter
