= William Cokkes =

English clergyman and Canon of Windsor

William Cokkes (died 1512) was a Canon of Windsor from 1500 – 1512.

== Career ==
He was appointed:

- Rector of St Magnus-the-Martyr, London Bridge 1480
- Rector of St Margaret, New Fish Street 1472 – 1512
- Queen's Chaplain

He was appointed to the first stall in St George's Chapel, Windsor Castle in 1500, and held the stall until 1512.
