= John Fitzwilliam =

John Fitzwilliam or FitzWilliam may refer to:

- John Fitzwilliam (died 1562), MP for Midhurst (UK Parliament constituency)
- John Fitzwilliam (divine) (died 1699)
- John Fitzwilliam, 2nd Earl Fitzwilliam (1681–1728)
- John Fitzwilliam (British Army officer) (1714–1789), MP for Windsor

== See also ==
- John Wentworth-FitzWilliam (1852 – 1889), British Liberal politician
- John Fitzwilliam Stairs
