= Heaver =

Heaver is a surname. Notable people with the surname include:

- Alfred Heaver (1841–1901), English carpenter turned "shadowy" builder and property developer
- Brent Heaver (born 1971), former Australian rules footballer
- John Heaver (died 1670), Anglican Canon of Windsor
- Michael Heaver (born 1989), British broadcaster and former politician
- Paul Heaver (born 1955), British-Canadian former ice hockey player
