= Thomas Goddard =

Thomas Goddard may refer to:

- Thomas Goddard (MP for Wiltshire), member of parliament for Wiltshire in 1767
- Thomas Goddard (MP) (1777–1814), member of parliament for Cricklade
- Thomas Goddard (priest) (1674–1731), Canon of Windsor
- Thomas Goddard (jurist) (1937–2019), New Zealand jurist

== See also ==
- Goddard family of Wiltshire, Hampshire and Berkshire, England
