= Robert Felton =

Robert Felton may refer to:

- Robert Felton (American football) (born 1984), American football guard
- Robert Felton (priest) (died 1438), canon of Windsor
- Robert Felton (cricketer) (1909–1982), English cricketer
- Roy Felton (Robert Francis Foster Felton, 1918–1982), English footballer
- Felix Felton (Robert Forbes Felton, 1911–1972), British actor
