= Francis Brown (priest) =

Francis Brown DD (1670 - 7 September 1724) was a Canon of Windsor from 1713 to 1724.

== Career ==
He was educated at Eton College and St John's College, Cambridge and graduated BA in 1693. He then moved to King's College, Cambridge and graduated MA in 1696 and DD in 1712.

He was appointed:

- Chaplain at King's College, Cambridge 1693 - 1694
- Vicar of Shalford 1694

He was appointed to the twelfth stall in St George's Chapel, Windsor Castle in 1713, and held the stall until 1724.
