= Thomas de Aston =

Thomas de Aston (died 1376) was a Canon of Windsor from 1369 to 1376.

== Career ==
He was appointed:

- Chaplain of St George's Chapel, Windsor Castle 1361
- Canon and Prebendary of the Collegiate Church of Norton (diocese of Durham)
- Prebendary of Wells 1367

He was appointed to the third stall in St George's Chapel, Windsor Castle in 1369 and held the canonry until 1376.
