= William Saxey (priest) =

English priest

William Saxey D.D. (d. 1 April 1577) was a Canon of Windsor from 1566 to 1577.

== Career ==
He was educated at Oxford University and graduated B.C.L. 1526 and B.Can.L. 1530.

He was appointed:

- Vicar of St Bride's, Fleet Street 1530 - 1543
- Prebendary of Willesden in St Paul's 1533 - 1566
- Canon of Southwell Minster 1542
- Rector of St Nicolas' Church, Guildford 1546
- Rector of Swanscome, Kent 1546
- Rector of Lawshall, Suffolk 1547
- Treasurer of St Paul's Cathedral 1559

He was appointed to the fourth stall in St George's Chapel, Windsor Castle in 1566, and held the stall until 1577.
