= John Vaughan (canon of Windsor) =

English Anglican priest (died 1499)

John Vaughan (d. 1499) was a Canon of Windsor from 1471 to 1499.

== Career ==
He was appointed:

- Rector of St Mary Abchurch 1465 - 1499
- Rector of Eastnor
- Rector of Hanwell
- Rector of Stoke-Lacy, Herefordshire

He was appointed to the fifth stall in St George's Chapel, Windsor Castle in 1471 and held the canonry until 1499.
