= Robert Wodmanston =

Robert Wodmanston (fl. 1460s) was a Canon of Windsor from 1468 to 1469.

== Career ==
He was appointed:

- Prebendary of St Mary in the Castle, Hastings 1469

He was appointed to the eighth stall in St George's Chapel, Windsor Castle in 1468 and held the canonry until 1469.
