= John Hartcliffe =

John Hartcliffe (1651 – 16 August 1712) was a Canon of Windsor from 1691 to 1712 and Headmaster of Merchant Taylors' School, Northwood.

== Career ==
He was King's Scholar at Eton College then educated at King's College, Cambridge and graduated BA in 1673, MA in 1676, and BD in 1689.

He was appointed:

- Headmaster of Merchant Taylors' School 1681 - 1686
- Vicar of Twickenham, Middlesex 1708 - 1712

He was appointed to the twelfth stall in St George's Chapel, Windsor Castle in 1691, and held the stall until 1712. He was buried in the chapel.

== Publications ==
He published many of his sermons, and also :

- Hartcliffe, John (1691). A treatise of moral and intellectual virtues wherein their nature is fully explained and their usefulness proved, as being the best rules of life ... : with a preface shewing the vanity and deceitfulness of vice.
