= Peter de Alcobasse =

Canon of Windsor (d. 1427)

Peter de Alcobasse (died 1427) was a Canon of Windsor from 1422 to 1427 and Physician.

== Career ==
He was appointed:

- Prebendary of Hoxton in St Paul's
- Physician to the King.

He was appointed to the eighth stall in St George's Chapel, Windsor Castle in 1422 and held the canonry until 1427.
