= Simon Marcheford =

Simon Marcheford (also Marchand) (fl. 1400s - 1440s) was a Canon of Windsor from 1407 to 1441.

== Career ==
He was appointed:

- Prebendary of South Alton in Salisbury 1407
- Prebendary of Stow-in-Lindsay in Lincoln 1411 - 1415
- Prebendary of Middleton in Chichester 1412 - 1415
- Precentor of St George's Chapel, Windsor Castle 1416 - 1417 and 1429 - 1431
- Steward of St George's Chapel, Windsor Castle 1424 - 1425

He was appointed to the ninth stall in St George's Chapel, Windsor Castle in 1407 and held the canonry until 1441.
