= William Butler (canon) =

Canon of Windsor

William Butler BDec (d. 1519) was a Canon of Windsor from 1503 to 1519

== Career ==
He was appointed to the sixth stall in St George's Chapel, Windsor Castle in 1503 and held the canonry until 1519.
