= William Creton =

William Creton (also Cretyng) (d. 1519) was a Canon of Windsor from 1489 to 1519.

== Career ==
He was appointed:

- Rector of South Molton (diocese of Exeter) 1486
- Fellow of King's College, Cambridge
- Prebendary of Combe and Harnham in Salisbury 1514

He was appointed to the tenth stall in St George's Chapel, Windsor Castle in 1489 and held the canonry until 1514.
