= Roger Gates =

English canon (died 1430)

Roger Gates (died 1430) was a Canon of Windsor from 1425 to 1430.

== Career ==
He was educated at Merton College, Oxford and became Bursar in 1405, and Junior Proctor 1408 - 1409.

He was appointed:

- King's Chaplain

He was appointed to the first stall in St George's Chapel, Windsor Castle in 1425 and held the canonry until 1430.
