= Henry Ryley =

English priest (died 1586)

Henry Ryley B.D. (d. 1586) was a Canon of Windsor from 1560 to 1586.

== Career ==
He was educated at Corpus Christi College, Oxford and graduated BA in 1534, MA in 1537, BD in 1544.

He was appointed:

- Rector of Stratfieldsaye, Hampshire
- Fellow of Eton College 1546
- Fellow of Collegiate Church, Manchester 1557
- Prebendary of Gillingham Major in Salisbury 1564

He was appointed to the tenth stall in St George's Chapel, Windsor Castle in 1560 and held the canonry until 1586.
