= David Hopton =

David Hopton (died 1492) was a Canon of Windsor from 1472 to 1492.

== Career ==
He was appointed:

- Clerk of the King's Closet
- Prebendary of Beaminster Prima in Salisbury 1483
- Prebendary of Bitton in Salisbury 1490
- Rector of Bletchley 1473

He was appointed to the eighth stall in St George's Chapel, Windsor Castle in 1472 and held the canonry until 1492.
