= Montague North =

Montague North DD (1712 – 22 August 1779) was a Canon of Windsor from 1775 to 1779.

== Career ==
He was educated at Jesus College, Cambridge and graduated BA in 1734, MA in 1737, and DD in 1767.

He was appointed:

- Rector of Sternfield, Suffolk 1767

He was appointed to the twelfth stall in St George's Chapel, Windsor Castle in 1775, and held the stall until 1779.

A memorial was erected in Sternfield church in his memory.
