= John Thompson (priest) =

English priest (died 1571)

John Thompson BD (d. 23 April 1571) was a Canon of Windsor from 1563 to 1574.

== Career ==
He was appointed:

- Canon of Gloucester 1552 - 1559
- Prebendary of Minor Pars Altaris in Salisbury 1556
- Prebendary of Durnford in Salisbury 1565 - 1571
- Chaplain to Queen Elizabeth I

He was appointed to the third stall in St George's Chapel, Windsor Castle in 1563 and held the canonry until 1571.
