= Champaign (disambiguation) =

Champaign is the tenth largest city in the U.S. state of Illinois.

Champaign may also refer to:

== Places ==
- Champaign County, Illinois
  - Champaign Township, Champaign County, Illinois
- Champaign County, Ohio

== Other uses ==
- Champaign (band)
- Champaign Central High School
- Champaign-Urbana Courier
- Champaign-Urbana Community Wireless Network
- Champaign-Urbana Mass Transit District
- "Champaign, Illinois", a song on The Grand Theatre, Volume One by the Old 97's
- Champaign ILL, an American comedy series

== See also ==
- Champagne (disambiguation)
- "Shampain", a song by Marina and the Diamonds from The Family Jewels
