= William Long (priest) =

William Long LL.B. (d. 16 July 1835) was a Canon of Windsor from 1804 to 1835.

== Family ==
He was the fifth son of Beeston Long and Sarah Cropp. His brother was Charles Long, 1st Baron Farnborough.

== Career ==
He was educated at Emmanuel College, Cambridge.

He was appointed:

- Rector of Sternfield, Suffolk 1788
- Rector of Dennington, Suffolk 1788 – 1808
- Rector of Pulham, Norfolk 1808

He was appointed to the tenth stall in St George's Chapel, Windsor Castle in 1804 and held the canonry until his death.
