= William Tate (priest) =

English priest (died 1540)

William Tate (died 1540) was a Canon of Windsor from 1523 to 1540.

== Career ==
He was appointed:

- Vicar of Everingham 1508 - 1524
- Rector of Thwing 1509 - 1528
- Treasurer of Beverley Minster 1520
- Prebendary of York 1522 - 1540
- Rector of Chelmsford 1522

He was appointed to the third stall in St George's Chapel, Windsor Castle in 1523 and held the canonry until 1540.
