= William Dole =

William Dole (died 1403) was a Canon of Windsor from 1377 to 1403.

== Career ==
He was appointed:

- Vicar of Exning, Suffolk 1371
- Vicar of Maresfield, Sussex
- Vicar of Croydon, Surrey 1371

He was appointed to the first stall in St George's Chapel, Windsor Castle in 1377 and held the canonry until 1403.
