= Roger Parker (priest) =

English priest (died 1355)

- Died: Year 1355.
- Title: Canon of Windsor.

Roger Parker (died 1355) was a Canon of Windsor from 1353 to 1355.

== Career ==
He was appointed:

- Rector of North Stoke, Oxfordshire.

He was appointed to the fourth stall in St George's Chapel, Windsor Castle in 1353 and held the canonry until 1355 and was supervisor from 1354.

His brass memorial exists in North Stoke, Oxfordshire.
