= Robert Fisher (priest) =

Robert Fisher (fl. 1490s – 1510s) was a Canon of Windsor from 1509 to 1510.

== Career ==
He was educated in Paris where he was taught by Desiderius Erasmus.

He was appointed:

- Chaplain to the King
- Vicar of Warkworth 1495
- Rector of Chedzoy, Somerset 1508

He was appointed to the eighth stall in St George's Chapel, Windsor Castle in 1509 and held the canonry until 1510.
