= Robert Thurgarton =

Robert Thurgarton (fl. 1410s - 1430s) was a Canon of Windsor from 1437 to 1438.

== Career ==
He was appointed:

- Prebendary of Leighton Manor in Lincoln 1417
- Rector of Grundisburgh, Suffolk
- Rector of Molesworth, Huntingdonshire
- Rector of Castor, Northamptonshire

He was appointed to the tenth stall in St George's Chapel, Windsor Castle in 1437 and held the canonry until 1438.
