= Richard Arche =

16th-century English priest

Richard Arche (also Archer) LL.B., D.C.L. was a Canon of Windsor from 1538 to 1553

== Career ==
He was appointed:

- Vicar of Ramsbury, Wiltshire 1518
- Vicar of Avebury, Wiltshire 1520
- Principal of Broadgates Hall, now Pembroke College, Oxford 1526
- Chaplain to Henry VIII of England 1538
- Rector of Hanney, Berkshire 1543
- Treasurer of Salisbury Cathedral 1551
- Prebendary of Faringdon in Salisbury Cathedral 1524
- Rector of Clewer 1554

He was appointed to the ninth stall in St George's Chapel, Windsor Castle in 1538, a position he held until 1553, when he was deprived of the living. He was a confessor to the Windsor Martyrs.
