= Ottiwell Hollinshed =

Ottiwell Hollinshed (also Ottuell and also Holinshed) MA (fl. 1550s) was a Canon of Windsor from 1550 to 1554 and one of the original Fellows of Trinity College, Cambridge.

== Family ==
He was the son of Hugh Holinshed.

He married Margaret, daughter of Henry Harden of Ascot.

== Career ==
He was educated at Christ's College, Cambridge and graduated BA in 1541, and MA in 1544.

He was appointed one of the Fellows of Trinity College, Cambridge by the charter of foundation of 19 December 1546.

He was appointed to the fifth stall in St George's Chapel, Windsor Castle in 1550 and held the canonry until 1554.
