= John Aleyn =

Canon of Windsor and Archdeacon of Suffolk

John Aleyn (fl. 1360s; died 1373) was a Canon of Windsor from 1362 to 1368 and Archdeacon of Suffolk from 1368 to 1373.

== Career ==
He was appointed:

- Rector of Chelmondiston, Suffolk until 1362
- Rector of Otteford, until 1368
- Rector of Wederingsete
- Rector of Bradstede
- Archdeacon of Suffolk 1368 - 1373
- Canon and Prebendary of Wells

He was appointed to the second stall in St George's Chapel, Windsor Castle in 1362 and held it until his death in 1373. He may well be the same person as the composer Johannes Alanus.
