= John Kirkeby =

English canon (fl. 1441 – 1460s)

John Kirkeby or John Kerby (fl. 1441 – 1460s) was a Canon of Windsor from 1455 to 1457 and Master of the Rolls from 1447 to 1461.

== Career ==
Kirkeby was:

- Prebendary of St Paul's 1449–1451
- Rector of St Pancras Soper Lane 1450–1452
- Chaplain to the King
- Rector of Langton (diocese of Lincoln) 1457
- Prebendary of Lincoln 1456–1462

He was appointed to the eighth stall in St George's Chapel, Windsor Castle in 1455 and held the canonry until 1457.
