= John Depeden =

English priest (died 1460)

John Depeden (died 1460) was a canon of Windsor from 1430 to 1460.

== Career ==
He was appointed:

- Treasurer of St George's Chapel, Windsor Castle 1440
- Prebendary of Wisborough in Chichester 1441–1460
- Rector of Denham
- Prebendary of Torleton in Salisbury 1443–1457
- Register of the Order of the Garter 1445

He was appointed to the sixth stall in St George's Chapel, Windsor Castle in 1430 and held the canonry until 1460.
