= Richard Surland =

Richard Surland (also Surlond) (died 20 August 1509) was a canon of Windsor from 1488 to 1509

== Career ==
He was appointed:

- Rector of St Peter ad Vincula, Tower of London from 1486 to 1509
- Master of St Anthony's Hospital
- Sub dean of the Chapel Royal
- Prebendary of Ruscomb in Salisbury Cathedral 1503

He was appointed to the ninth stall in St George's Chapel, Windsor Castle in 1488, a position he held until 1509.

A memorial brass was installed in St George's Chapel, Windsor in his memory, and sketched around 1610 by Nicholas Charles, but is now lost.
