= Arthur Cole (priest) =

Arthur Cole DD (d. 18 July 1558) was a canon of Windsor from 1543 to 1558 and president of Magdalen College, Oxford, from 1555 to 1558.

== Career ==
He was educated at Magdalen College, Oxford, where he graduated BA in 1518, MA in 1522, BD in 1554 and DD in 1555.

He was appointed:

- Cross bearer to Cardinal Wolsey
- Rector of Oddington, Gloucestershire 1547
- Rector of Remenham, Berkshire 1549
- Prebendary of Twyford in St Paul's 1554
- Fellow of Eton College 1554
- President of Magdalen College, Oxford 1555 - 1558

He was appointed to the eleventh stall in St George's Chapel, Windsor Castle in 1543 and held the canonry until 1558.

He was buried in the chapel at Magdalen College, Oxford, where his brass memorial remains.
