= John Landyran =

English cleric (fl. 1370s)

John Landyran MD DD (fl. 1370s) was a Canon of Windsor from 1375 to 1376

== Career ==
He was appointed:

- Prebendary of St Thomas the Martyr, Glasney 1376
- Prebendary of the King's Free Chapel of Hastings 1376

He was appointed to the first stall in St George's Chapel, Windsor Castle in 1375 and held the canonry until 1376.
