= James Rowlandson =

English religious figure

James Rowlandson D.D. (1577 – 9 May 1639) was a Canon of Windsor from 1638 to 1639.

== Career ==
Rowlandson was educated at Queen's College, Oxford where he graduated BA in 1602, MA in 1605, BD in 1614 and DD in 1636.

He was appointed:

- Chaplain to Bishop Bilson of Winchester
- Vicar of Southampton St Cross and Holyrood 1611
- Rector of Bramdean 1615
- Rector of East Tisted, Hampshire 1615
- Master of the Hospital of St Mary Magdalene, Winchester
- Chaplain to King Charles I

He was appointed to the eighth stall in St George's Chapel, Windsor Castle in 1638 and held the canonry until 1639.

== Works ==
- Iames Rowlandson [i.e., James Rowlandson] (1623). Gods Blessing in Blasting, and His Mercy in Mildew. Two Sermons Sutable to These Times of Death. London: Printed by Iohn Haviland for William Bladen, at the great north doore of Pauls. OCLC 1203238552.
