= William Gyloth =

William Gyloth (also Gillot) (d. 1428) was a Canon of Windsor from 1401 to 1428.

== Career ==
He was appointed:

- Rector of St Andrew Hubbard 1421 - 1427
- Steward of St George's Chapel, Windsor 1410

He was appointed to the eleventh stall in St George's Chapel, Windsor Castle in 1428 and held the canonry until 1432.
