= William Lane (priest) =

William Lane (fl. 15th century) was a Canon of Windsor from 1403 to 1404.

== Career ==
He was appointed:

- Chaplain of the King's Free Chapel in Southampton Castle 1392
- Archpriest of the Oratory of Holy Trinity, Barton, Isle of Wight 1392
- Master of St Mark's Hospital, Billeswyk, Bristol 1393
- Prebendary of St Stephen's Westminster, 1395 - 1402
- Prebendary of Carlton Kyme in Lincoln 1402

He was appointed to the first stall in St George's Chapel, Windsor Castle in 1403 and held the canonry until 1404.
