= Thomas Hurdis =

Thomas Hurdis D.D. (d. 29 March 1784) was a Canon of Windsor from 1766 to 1784.

== Family ==
He was the eldest surviving son of Thomas Hurdis (c.1674-1733) Vicar of Ringmer 1727–1733.

== Career ==
He was educated at Merton College, Oxford where he graduated DD.

He was appointed:

- Vicar of Seaford 1734 - 1779
- Canon of York
- Vicar of Amport, Hampshire
- Custos of St Mary's Hospital, Chichester
- Prebendary of Middleton in Chichester 1755 - 1784
- Vicar of Wantage

He was appointed to the fourth stall in St George's Chapel, Windsor Castle in 1766 and held this until he died in 1784.

A monument to him was erected in Chichester Cathedral.
