= Thomas Frith =

Thomas Frith BD (1569 - 9 March 1631) was a Canon of Windsor from 1610 to 1631.

== Career ==
He was educated at Magdalen Hall, Oxford and All Souls College, Oxford and graduated MA in 1594 and BD in 1604.

He was appointed:

- Rector of Elmley, Kent

He was appointed to the sixth stall in St George's Chapel, Windsor Castle in 1610 and held the canonry until 1631.
