= Robert Young (priest) =

Robert Young M.A. (d. 9 August 1716) was a Canon of Windsor from 1673 to 1716.

== Career ==
He was educated at Eton College and King's College, Cambridge.

He was appointed:

- Chaplain to Prince Rupert
- Lower Master of Eton College to 1672
- Rector of Eversden, Northamptonshire 1683
- Fellow of Eton College 1693

He was appointed to the first stall in St George's Chapel, Windsor Castle in 1673, and held the stall until 1716.
