= David Stokes (priest) =

David Stokes DD (died 10 May 1669) was a Canon of Windsor from 1628 to 1669.

== Career ==
He was educated at Westminster School and then Trinity College, Cambridge where he was awarded a BA in 1615. From Peterhouse, Cambridge he was awarded an MA in 1618, and a DD in 1630.

He was appointed:

- Fellow of Eton College (deprived 1644)
- Rector of Brinklow, Warwickshire 1625
- Rector of Binfield, Berkshire 1631 (deprived 1644)
- Precentor of Chichester Cathedral 1629 - 1631
- Rector of Everden 1638
- Rector of Urchfont, Wiltshire 1644.

He was appointed to the third stall in St George's Chapel, Windsor Castle in 1628, a position he held until 1669, except for the period of the Commonwealth of England.
