= Whitehorn (surname) =

Whitehorn or Whitehorne is a surname. Notable people with the name include:

- Geoff Whitehorn (born 1951), British singer-songwriter
- George Whitehorne (died 1565), Canon of Windsor
- Jason Whitehorn (born 1976), American singer-songwriter
- John Clare Whitehorn (1894–1974), American psychiatric educator
- Joseph A. Whitehorn (1879–1926), American politician
- Katharine Whitehorn (1928–2021), British journalist
- Laura Whitehorn (born 1945), American activist
- Will Whitehorn (born 1960), British business executive
