= Eston (name) =

Eston is both a surname and a given name. Notable people with the name include:

== Given name ==
- Eston Hemings (1808–1856), American slave, possibly son of Thomas Jefferson
- Eston Kaonga (born 1948), Malawian sprinter
- Eston Kohver (born 1971), Estonian police officer
- Eston Mulenga (1967–1993), Zambian footballer

== Surname ==
- Frederik Ešton, pen name of Mitar Milošević (1924–1995), Serbian and Yugoslav writer
- John Eston (disambiguation)
- Thomas Eston, English Member of Parliament in 1413 and mayor of Exeter in the 1410s and '20s
