= Forbes Champagné =

Lieutenant-General Forbes Champagné
- Born: 2 July 1754; Clonmacnoise, County Offaly, Kingdom of Ireland
- Died: 23 October 1816 (aged 62); Mitcham, London
- Burial place: Church of St. Peter & St. Paul, Mitcham
- Military career
- Allegiance: United Kingdom
- Branch: British Army
- Rank: Lieutenant-General
- Commands: British Indian Army
- Conflicts: American Revolutionary War

Lieutenant-General Forbes Champagné (2 July 1754 – 23 October 1816) was a British Army officer who fought in the American Revolutionary War and officiated as commander-in-chief of the British Indian Army from 1807 to 1811.

== Background ==
Champagné was born into a family of French Huguenot exiles in Ireland, the son of the Very Rev. Arthur de Robillard Champagné, Dean of Clonmacnoise, and Marianne Hamon, daughter of Colonel Isaac Hamon. His paternal great-grandfather was Chevalier Josias de Robillard, Seigneur de Champagné de Torxé, Saintonge, who fled to Holland after the Edict of Fontainebleau in 1685, joining William of Orange's army. He married Marie de la Rochefoucauld of the noble house of the same name. Their daughter Susanne married Henri de la Motte-Fouqué, baron de Saint-Seurin et de Tonnay-Boutonne, and was mother of Heinrich August de la Motte Fouqué. Their eldest son, Josias de Robillard (Forbes' grandfather), distinguished himself at a young age in service of Major-general Isaac de Monceau de la Melonière, who commanded a regiment of exiles in William's army during the Irish campaigns. He married Lady Jane Forbes, daughter of Arthur Forbes, 2nd Earl of Granard.

Forbes had three brothers: General Sir Josiah Champagné; Rev. Arthur Champagné, vicar of Castlelyons; and Rev. George Champagné, Canon of Windsor and Rector of Twickenham. He had six sisters, including Jane, who married the Earl of Uxbridge; Henrietta, wife of Sir Erasmus Dixon Borrowes, 6th Baronet; and Marianne, wife of Sir Charles des Voeux, 1st Baronet.

== Military career ==
Champagné was commissioned into the 4th Regiment of Foot in 1773. He served in the Southern Colonies during the American Revolutionary War and took part in the Battle of Wetzell's Mill in 1781. By 1796 he had been appointed commanding officer of the 20th Regiment of Foot.

He was promoted to colonel on 26 January 1797 and to major general on 25 September 1803. He started officiating as Commander-in-Chief, India in 1807 and was also appointed colonel of the 1st Battalion of the 95th Regiment of Foot in 1809.

Promoted to lieutenant general on 25 July 1810, he ceased officiating as commander-in-chief, India, following the appointment of Sir George Nugent, 1st Baronet in 1811.

He lived in Merton and died on 23 October 1816.

Military offices
New regiment	Colonel of the 8th Garrison Battalion; 1806–1809	Succeeded by John Despard
Preceded by Sir George Hewett	Commander-in-Chief, India; 1807–1811	Succeeded by Sir George Nugent
New regiment	Colonel-Commandant of the 1st Battalion, 95th Regiment of Foot; 1809–1816	Succeeded by Sir Brent Spencer
Preceded by Sir Lowry Cole	Colonel of the 70th (Glasgow Lowland) Regiment of Foot; 1816	Succeeded by Sir Kenneth Howard
