= William Bonetemps =

English cleric (fl. 1430s – 1440s)

William Bonetemps (fl. 1430s – 1440s) was a Canon of Windsor from 1431 to 1442.

== Career ==
He was appointed:

- Rector of Littleton until 1431
- Prebendary of the 10th stall in St Stephen's, Westminster 1420 - 1431

He was appointed to the eighth stall in St George's Chapel, Windsor Castle in 1431 and held the canonry until 1442.
