= Richard Wilmot =

Richard Wilmot DD (1703–1772) was a Canon of Windsor from 1748 to 1772.

== Family ==
He was the son of Robert Wilmot of Osmaston Hall, Derbyshire.

== Career ==
He was educated at St John's College, Cambridge and was awarded BA in 1725, MA in 1728 and DD in 1744.

He was appointed:

- Rector of Trusley, Derbyshire 1733 - 1738
- Vicar of Mickleover, Derbyshire 1740 - 1772
- Rector of Morley, Derbyshire 1740 - 1772
- Chaplain to the Bishop of Bangor
- Rector of St Benet Fink, London 1763 - 1772

He was appointed to the ninth stall in St George's Chapel, Windsor Castle in 1748, a position he held until 1772.
