= Charles Sonibancke =

Charles Sonibancke DD (1564 – 12 October 1638) was a Canon of Windsor from 1598 to 1638.

== Career ==
He was educated at St Mary Hall, Oxford and Christ Church, Oxford where he graduated BA in 1586, MA in 1589 and DD in 1607.

He was appointed:

- Official of the Archbishop of Canterbury 1596
- Rector of Wrotham, Kent 1597
- Rector of Wittenham, Berkshire 1597
- Rector of Great Haseley, Oxfordshire 1610

He was appointed to the eighth stall in St George's Chapel, Windsor Castle in 1598 and held the canonry until 1638.
