= John Hern =

Canon of Windsor (died 1707)

John Hern (also Herne) D.D. (d. 24 April 1707) was a Canon of Windsor from 1690 to 1707

== Career ==
He was educated at Clare College, Cambridge where he graduated BA in 1677, MA in 1680 and DD in 1690.

He was appointed:

- Rector of East Woodhay, Hampshire 1691–1707
- Rector of East Shefford, Berkshire 1694–1707

He was appointed to the fifth stall in St George's Chapel, Windsor Castle in 1690 and held this until he died in 1707.
