= Champange =

Champange may refer to:

- Séverine Champange-Gerfaux (b. 1978), French ski mountaineer

== See also ==
- Champagne (disambiguation)
- Champanges, a commune in southern France
