= John Stokes (canon of Windsor) =

English Catholic priest, Canon of Windsor

John Stokes BCanL (died 1503) was a Canon of Windsor from 1486 to 1503.

== Career ==
He was appointed:

- Warden of All Souls College, Oxford 1466 - 1494
- Rector of Broughton, Oxfordshire

He was appointed to the sixth stall in St George's Chapel, Windsor Castle in 1486 and held the canonry until 1503.
