= Henry Aglionby =

Dominican friar (d.1558)

Henry Aglionby D.D. (died 1558) was a Dominican friar who became a Canon of Windsor in 1546–1554.

== Career ==
He was a Dominican Friar. After the Dissolution of the Monasteries, he was married.

He was appointed:

- Prebendary of Lincoln
- Chaplain to King Henry VIII

Rector of St James Garlickhythe 1538

He was appointed to the fourth stall in St George's Chapel, Windsor Castle in 1546, and held the stall until he was deprived of it in 1554.
