= Philip Duval =

Philip Duval FRS FSA (also Du Val, 1732 – 14 March 1808) was a Canon of Windsor from 1772 to 1808. He was chaplain to the Duke of Gloucester.

Duval was the son of the French-born Dr. Philippe Duval, physician to the Augusta of Saxe-Gotha, Princess of Wales, the mother of George III. His mother was Marianne Aufrère of Burnside and Foulsham Old Hall, descended from Huguenot nobility.

== Career ==
He was educated at Westminster School and Trinity College, Cambridge and was awarded LLB in 1750 and DD in 1756.

He was appointed:

- Prebendary of Worcester Cathedral 1767-1772
- Rector of Broodwas, Worcestershire 1768
- Preceptor to the Dukes of Cumberland and Gloucester
- Chaplain and Treasurer to the Duke of Gloucester
- Rector of Hartley Westpall 1786
- Rector of Isleworth 1792
- Vicar of Twickenham 1792-1808

He was appointed to the ninth stall in St George's Chapel, Windsor Castle in 1772, a position he held until 1808.

He married Anna George, daughter of Dr William George, Provost of King's College, Cambridge.
