= John Pye (priest) =

John Pye (fl. 1430s) was a Canon of Windsor from 1430 to 1439.

== Career ==
He was appointed:

- Rector of St Mary Abchurch 1431 - 1433
- Master of St Laurence Pountney 1433 - 1435
- Rector of King's Cliffe, Northamptonshire 1419 - 1420
- Rector of St Mary Bothaw until 1420
- Rector of Great Brickhill, Buckinghamshire

He was appointed to the first stall in St George's Chapel, Windsor Castle in 1430 and held the canonry until 1439.
