= John Seymour (priest) =

John Seymour (died 1501) was a Canon of Windsor from 1471 to 1501.

== Career ==
He was educated at All Souls' College, Oxford.

He was appointed:

- Proctor of Oxford
- Rector of St James’ Church, Garlickhythe 1473 - 1488
- Prebendary of Yetminster Secunda in Salisbury 1476

He was appointed to the third stall in St George's Chapel, Windsor Castle in 1471 and held the canonry until 1501.
