= John Wolward =

John Wolward MA (d. 1598) was a Canon of Windsor from 1574 to 1598

== Career ==
He was educated at Eton College and King's College, Cambridge where he graduated BA in 1561 and MA in 1564.

He was appointed:

- Conduct-Fellow of Eton College 1565
- Rector of Puttenham, Surrey 1567 - 1598
- Prebendary of Rochester 1575 - 1585
- Rector of Windlesham, Surrey 1588

He was appointed to the eighth stall in St George's Chapel, Windsor Castle in 1574 and held the canonry until 1598.
