= Robert Allerton (priest) =

Robert Allerton (died 19 April 1437) was a Canon of Windsor from 1432 to 1437.

== Career ==
He was appointed:

- Prebendary of Cropredy in Lincoln 1420
- Rector of Amersham 1420
- Prebendary of Ripon 1420
- Prebendary of Bracklesham in Chichester

He was appointed to the eleventh stall in St George's Chapel, Windsor Castle in 1432 and held the canonry until 1437.
