= James Barclay (priest) =

James Barclay MA (d. 29 December 1750) was a Canon of Windsor from 1724 - 1750.

== Career ==
Barclay was appointed Rector of West Ilsley, Berkshire in 1743.

He was appointed to the twelfth stall in St George's Chapel, Windsor Castle in 1724, and held the stall until 1750.
