= Maurice Vaughan =

Canon of Windsor (1660–1722)

Maurice Vaughan (1660 – 26 April 1722) was a Canon of Windsor from 1695 to 1722

== Career ==
He was educated at Eton College and St John's College, Cambridge and graduated BA in 1681, and MA in 1684.

He was appointed:

- Fellow of Trinity Hall, Cambridge 1685 - 1694
- Rector of Yelling 1692 - 1722
- Prebendary of Lichfield 1692 - 1722

He was appointed to the second stall in St George's Chapel, Windsor Castle in 1695, and held the stall until 1722.
