= Edmund Gibson (priest) =

Edmund Gibson MA (1713–1771) was a Canon of Windsor from 1742 to 1746.

== Family ==
Gibson was born in 1713, the son of Edmund Gibson, Bishop of London.

== Career ==
Gibson was educated at Christ Church, Oxford and graduated BA in 1734 and MA in 1737.

He was successively appointed:

- Prebendary of Rugmere in St Paul's 1738–1741
- Prebendary of Chiswick in St Paul's 1740–1744
- Prebendary of Mapesbury in St Paul's 1743–1747
- Prebendary of Kentish Town in St Paul's 1746–1770
- Precentor of St Paul's Cathedral 1741–1770

In 1742 he was appointed to the eighth stall in St George's Chapel, Windsor Castle, where he held the canonry until 1746.
