= Thomas Passhe =

Thomas Passhe (died 1489) was a Canon of Windsor from 1449 to 1489.

== Career ==
He was appointed:

- Prebendary of Minor Pars Altaris in Salisbury 1448
- Sub-Almoner to the King

He was appointed to the tenth stall in St George's Chapel, Windsor Castle in 1449 and held the canonry until 1489.
