= Thomas Some =

Thomas Some D.D. (d. 5 May 1649) was a Canon of Windsor from 1622 to 1644

== Career ==
He was educated at Peterhouse, Cambridge and graduated BA in 1608, MA in 1611, and DD in 1627.

He was appointed:

- Vicar of Staines, Middlesex 1616 - 1649
- Prebendary of Cadington Minor in St Paul's Cathedral 1617
- Vicar of Twickenham, Middlesex 1640 - 1649

He was appointed to the second stall in St George's Chapel, Windsor Castle in 1622, and held the stall until 1644 when he was imprisoned.

He died on 5 May 1649 and was buried in Broad Street, London.
