= John Kette =

John Kette (died 1455) was a Canon of Windsor from 1437 to 1452.

== Career ==
He was appointed:

- Sub almoner of King Henry VI
- Rector of St Nicholas ad Macellas 1437 - 1455
- Prebendary of Holborn in St Paul's Cathedral 1444 - 1455
- Prebendary of St Stephen's, Westminster 1448
- Rector of Shepperton 1452 - 1455

He was appointed to the seventh stall in St George's Chapel, Windsor Castle in 1437, and held the stall until 1452.
