= John Malvern =

John Malvern (died 1442) was a Canon of Windsor from 1408 to 1416.

== Career ==
He was appointed:

- Rector of St Dunstan-in-the-East 1402 - 1422
- Prebendary of Chamberlainwood in St Paul's 1406 - 1422
- Warden of the Free Chapel of St Mary, Jesmond, Newcastle upon Tyne 1416 - 1421

He was appointed to the third stall in St George's Chapel, Windsor Castle in 1408 and held the canonry until 1416.
