= Richard Shawe =

Richard Shawe (fl. 1370s – 1410s) was a Canon of Windsor from 1376 to 1403.

== Career ==
He was appointed:

- Rector of Littlebury, Essex 1361 - 1368
- Prebendary of the first stall in St Stephen's, Westminster 1368 - 1376
- Rector of Farnham (diocese of Lincoln) 1371
- Warden of the Hospital of St Margaret by Huntyngdon until 1371

He was appointed to the sixth stall in St George's Chapel, Windsor Castle in 1376 and held the canonry until 1403.
