= John Notyngham =

English priest (died 1418)

John Notyngham (died 20 December 1418) was a Canon of Windsor from 1387 - 1389 and Dean of Hastings.

== Career ==
He was appointed:

- Chancellor of Hereford 1384, 1386
- Prebendary of Lichfield 1387, 1397, 1398
- Prebendary of Colworth in Chichester 1397
- Prebendary of Chiswick in St Paul's 1406 - 1418
- Treasurer of York 1415
- Dean of Hastings

He was appointed to the fourth stall in St George's Chapel, Windsor Castle in 1387, and held the stall until 1389.
