= Paul French (priest) =

Paul French (died 1 November 1600) was a Canon of Windsor from 1560 to 1600.

== Career ==
He was educated at All Souls College, Oxford and graduated BA in 1542, and MA in 1545.

He was appointed:

- Rector of Little Wittenham, Berkshire 1552
- Rector of Boyton, Wiltshire 1565
- Prebendary of Canterbury Cathedral 1566–1600
- Prebendary of Milton Manor in Lincoln Cathedral 1588–1600

He was appointed to the second stall in St George's Chapel, Windsor Castle in 1560, and held the stall until 1600.
