= Hugh Whytchirche =

English cleric (died 1376)

Hugh Whytchirche (died 1 January 1376) was a Canon of Windsor from 1352 to 1375.

== Career ==
He was Rector of St Mary's Church, Finchley from 1335, and Rector of St Andrew's Church, Cotton, Suffolk from 1361.

In 1352 he was appointed as the first Canon of the first stall in St George's Chapel, Windsor Castle.
