= John Eston =

John Eston may refer to:

- John Aston (fl. 1362–1391) or John Eston, MP
- John Eston (died 1565), MP
- John Eston (priest) (fl. 1400s–1420s), Canon of Windsor
