= William Cookson (priest) =

William Cookson (died February 1820) was a Canon of Windsor from 1792 to 1820.

== Career ==
He was educated at St John’s College, Cambridge.

He was appointed:

- Rector of Forcett St Peter and St Mary, Norfolk
- Rector of West Ilsley 1808
- Rector of Binfield

He was appointed to the eighth stall in St George's Chapel, Windsor Castle in 1792 and held the canonry until 1820.
