= George Stephens (priest) =

English priest (died 1751)

George Stephens M.A. (died 18 January 1751) was a Canon of Windsor from 1735 - 1751

== Career ==
He was appointed:

- Vicar of All Saints’ Church, Isleworth 1746 - 1751
- Rector of West Clandon, Surrey

He was appointed to the first stall in St George's Chapel, Windsor Castle in 1735, and held the stall until 1751. He was buried in the chapel.
