= William Brewster (priest) =

English priest (died 1465)

William Brewster (died 1465) was a Canon of Windsor from 1432 to 1437.

== Career ==
He was appointed:

- Prebendary of Lincoln 1437
- Prebendary of Neasden in St Paul's 1442 - 1465
- Rector of Shitlyngdon of Arlesey, Bedfordshire
- Rector of St Nicholas ad Macellas 1435 - 1438

He was appointed to the tenth stall in St George's Chapel, Windsor Castle in 1432 and held the canonry until 1437. In 1439 he was appointed to the first stall, which he held until 1465.
