= John Elly =

Canon of Windsor (1581–1639)

John Elly (also Ellis) DD (1581–1639) was a canon of Windsor from 1623 to 1639.

== Career ==
He was educated at Exeter College, Oxford and Merton College, Oxford where he graduated BA 1602, MA in 1607, BD and DD in 1633.

He was appointed:

- Rector of Lapworth, Warwick 1613
- Vicar of Elham, Kent 1612 - 1614
- Vicar of Ruislip 1633 - 1639
- Vicar of Isleworth 1637 - 1639

He was appointed to the twelfth stall in St George's Chapel, Windsor Castle in 1623, and held the stall until 1639.
