= William Wade (canon of Windsor) =

English Anglican priest, Canon of Windsor

William Wade MA (1672–1733) was a Canon of Windsor from 1720 to 1730.

== Family ==
He was born in 1672, the son of Jerome Wade. His brother was General George Wade.

He died in 1733 in Bath.

== Career ==
He was educated at Trinity College, Cambridge and graduated BA in 1694, MA in 1697.

He was appointed Prebendary of Chichester in 1729.

He was appointed to the tenth stall in St George's Chapel, Windsor Castle in 1720 and held the canonry until 1730.
