= Geoffrey Bryan Bentley =

(Geoffrey) Bryan Bentley (16 July 1909 – 12 September 1996) was a Canon of Windsor from 1957 to 1982

== Career ==
He was educated at King's College, Cambridge.

He was appointed:

- Assistant Curate, St Cuthbert's, Copnor 1933 - 1935
- Tutor of Scholae Cancellarii, Lincoln 1935 -1938
- Lecturer 1938 - 1952
- Priest Vicar, Lincoln Cathedral 1938 - 1952
- Proctor in Convocation 1945 - 1955
- Rector, Milton Abbot with Dunteron 1952 - 1957
- Examining Chaplain to the Bishop of Exeter 1952 - 1974;

He was appointed to the eleventh stall in St George's Chapel, Windsor Castle, in 1957, and held the stall until 1982.
