= Thomas Horn =

Thomas or Tom Horn may refer to:

- Tom Horn (1860–1903), American scout, cowboy, soldier, range detective, and Pinkerton agent
- Tom Horn (film), 1980 Western film
- Thomas E. Horn, president of the San Francisco War Memorial and Performing Arts Center
- Thomas Horn (actor) (born 1997), American attorney and former actor

== See also ==
- Thomas Horne (disambiguation)
- Tom Horne (born 1945), Canadian-American attorney and politician
