= John Wygryme =

English priest

John Wygryme (died 5 October 1468) was a Canon of Windsor from 1457 to 1468.

== Career ==
He was appointed:

- Senior proctor of Merton College, Oxford 1428
- Rector of Devizes, Wiltshire
- Prebendary of Decem Librarum, Lincoln 1457 - 1468

He was appointed to the eighth stall in St George's Chapel, Windsor Castle in 1457 and held the canonry until 1468.
