= William Chamberlain (priest) =

William Chamberlain DD (d. 18 May 1666) was a Canon of Windsor from 1660 to 1666.

== Career ==
He was educated at Trinity College, Cambridge and graduated BA in 1640, MA in 1643, and DD in 1660.

He was appointed:

- Domestic Chaplain to James Butler, 1st Duke of Ormonde
- Rector of Orwell, Cambridge 1664 - 1666

He was appointed to the sixth stall in St George's Chapel, Windsor Castle in 1660 and held the canonry until 1666.
