= John Bostock (priest) =

John Bostock D.D. (died 18 February 1786) was a Canon of Windsor from 1757 - 1786.

== Career ==
He was educated at Brasenose College, Oxford where he graduated BA in 1730, MA in 1738, BD and DD in 1761.

He was appointed:

- Conduct of Eton College 1733 - 1750
- Minor Canon of Windsor 1735 - 1757
- Rector of West Ilsley 1775

He was appointed to the first stall in St George's Chapel, Windsor Castle in 1757, and held the stall until 1786. He was buried in the chapel.
