= Roger Browne (priest) =

English priest

Roger Browne BD (circa 1541 - June 1601) was a Canon of Windsor from 1571 to 1601.

== Career ==
He was educated at Eton College and King's College, Cambridge where he graduated BA in 1561, MA in 1564, BD in 1576.

He was Vicar of South Weald, Essex (1567-1576), Rector of Duddinghurst (1567-1584), and Rector of Farnham Royal (1589-1601).

He was appointed to the seventh stall in St George's Chapel, Windsor Castle in 1571 and held the canonry until 1601.
