= John Butler (priest) =

17th-century English priest

John Butler DD (d. 1682) was a Canon of Windsor from 1669 to 1682.
