= Josiah Champagné =

British military personnel

General Sir Josiah Champagné GCH
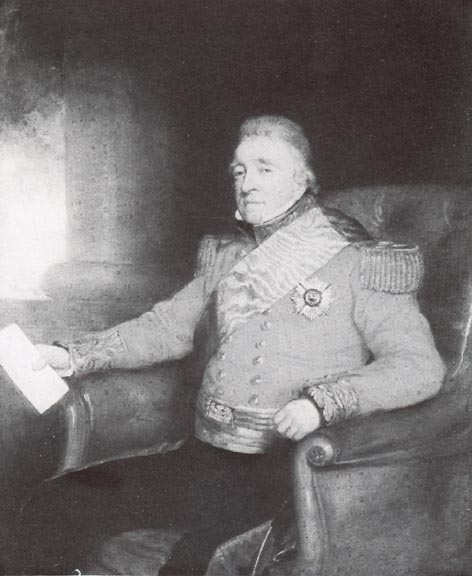

5th General Officer Commanding, Ceylon
- In office February 1799 – 1799
- Preceded by: Pierre Frédéric de Meuron
- Succeeded by: Hay MacDowall

Personal details
- Born: 26 September 1755 Kingdom of Ireland
- Died: 31 January 1840 (aged 84) Harley Street, London

Military service
- Allegiance: United Kingdom
- Branch/service: British Army
- Rank: General

General Sir Josiah Champagné GCH (26 September 1755 – 31 January 1840) was a British military commander who was the fifth General Officer Commanding, Ceylon. He was appointed in February 1799 until 1799. He was succeeded by Hay MacDowall.

== Background ==
Champagné was born into a family of French Huguenot exiles in Ireland, the son of the Very Rev. Arthur Champagné, Dean of Clonmacnoise, and Marianne Hamon, daughter of Colonel Isaac Hamon. His paternal great-grandfather was the Chevalier Josias de Robillard, Seigneur de Champagné de Torxé, Saintonge, who fled to Holland after the Edict of Fontainebleau in 1685, joining William of Orange's army. He married Marie de la Rochefoucauld of the noble house of the same name. Their daughter Susanne married Henri de la Motte-Fouqué, baron de Saint-Seurin et de Tonnay-Boutonne, and was mother of Heinrich August de la Motte Fouqué. Their eldest son, Josias de Robillard, distinguished himself at a young age in service of Major-General Isaac de Monceau de la Melonière, who commanded a regiment of exiles in William's army during the Irish campaigns. He married Lady Jane Forbes, daughter of Arthur Forbes, 2nd Earl of Granard.

Josiah had three brothers: Lt.-Gen. Forbes Champagné; Rev. Arthur Champagné, vicar of Castlelyons; and Rev. George Champagné, Canon of Windsor and Rector of Twickenham. He had six sisters, including Jane, who married the Earl of Uxbridge; Henrietta, wife of Sir Erasmus Dixon Borrowes, 6th Baronet; and Marianne, wife of Sir Charles des Voeux, 1st Baronet. Josiah married Dorcas Brownrigg and had one son, Arthur Champagné.

== Career ==
Champagné joined the British Army on 28 January 1775 as an ensign in the 31st Regiment of Foot. In March 1776 he embarked with his regiment, landed in America in May, and remained on active service till the peace, when he returned to England. On 11 July 1777 he obtained his lieutenancy, in April 1783 a company in the 99th Regiment of Foot, and in March 1784 a company in the 3rd Regiment of Foot.

Captain Champagné joined his corps in May 1784 in Jamaica, and in 1785 went with the expedition to the Spanish main; he continued in the West Indies five years, then returned to England. In 1793 he again embarked for the West Indies under Sir Charles Grey, but proceeded to the relief of Nieuport. On 18 September he was appointed to a majority in the 80th Regiment of Foot and on 19 December to a lieutenant-colonelcy. In 1794 he again went to the Continent, and returned with the army in 1795. He twice embarked in the latter year in command of his regiment for the coast of France: the misfortune at Quiberon prevented the first expedition from proceeding beyond Plymouth; the second, under Major-General Doyle, took possession of Isle Dieu, and remained on that service until January 1796, when he returned to England.

In March 1796, Lieutenant-Colonel Champagné embarked in command of his regiment for the Cape of Good Hope, and at the close of the year sailed with the regiment for the East Indies. On 26 January 1797, he was appointed colonel by brevet, and in 1800 to the command of an expedition against Batavia, with the rank of brigadier-general, but which was subsequently countermanded. In 1801 he was appointed second-in-command to the army that sailed from India for Egypt. In 1803 he returned to England, and on 25 September that year was appointed major-general. On 25 July 1810 he was promoted lieutenant-general. He was colonel of the 41st Regiment of Foot on 25 February 1810, from which he was removed to the colonelcy of the 17th Regiment of Foot on 14 June 1819. He was promoted full general on 19 July 1821.

On 26 January 1832, he was made a Knight Grand Cross of the Royal Guelphic Order by King William IV.

Military offices
Preceded by Pierre Frédéric de Meuron	General Officer Commanding, Ceylon; 1799	Succeeded by Hay MacDowall
Honorary titles
Preceded by New regiment	Colonel of the Malay Regiment (1st Ceylon Regiment from 1807); 1801–1810	Succeeded by Frederick Maitland
Preceded by Hay MacDowall	Colonel of the 41st Regiment of Foot; 1810–1819	Succeeded by Sir Edward Stopford
Preceded by George Garth	Colonel of the 17th (the Leicestershire) Regiment of Foot; 1819–1840	Succeeded by Sir Frederick Augustus Wetherall
