= Robert Ravendale =

Robert Ravendale (died 19 April 1404) was a Canon of Windsor from 1399 to 1404.

== Career ==
He was appointed:

- Rector of Thenford, Northamptonshire
- Rector of Littlebury, Essex
- Rector of St Martin, Ludgate
- Rector of Byfield, Northamptonshire

He was appointed to the fourth stall in St George's Chapel, Windsor Castle in 1399, and held the stall until 1404.
