= Thomas Madefray =

Thomas Madefray (died 1375) was a Canon of Windsor from 1355 to 1375.

== Career ==
He was appointed:

- Clerk to Edward, Prince of Wales
- Rector of Bradninch, Devon 1349
- Prebendary of Wells
- Prebendary of Glasney 1348-9

He was appointed to the eleventh stall in St George's Chapel, Windsor Castle in 1355 and held the canonry until 1375.
