= James Malett =

James Malett B.D. (d. 1543) was a Canon of Windsor from 1514 to 1543.

== Career ==
He was educated at Queens' College, Cambridge where he graduated BA in 1497, MA in 1501, and BD in 1509.

He was appointed:

- Chaplain to Henry VIII's first wife, Queen Katherine of Aragon
- Vicar of Burnham, Buckinghamshire 1504
- Rector of Great Leighs, Essex 1514 - 1542
- Prebendary of Lincoln Cathedral 1519 - 1542
- Rector of Leadenham, Lincolnshire 1542 - 1543
- Precentor of Lincoln Cathedral 1553 - 1538
- Master of the Hospital of St. Giles’, High Wycombe, Buckinghamshire

He was appointed to the eleventh stall in St George's Chapel, Windsor Castle in 1514 and held this until he died in 1543.

He was executed in 1543 at Chelmsford for remarks about the suppression of the monasteries.
