= William Burchett =

Canon of Windsor

William Burchett (1694 - 27 December 1750) was a Canon of Windsor from 1739 to 1750.

== Career ==
He was educated at Eton College and Peterhouse, Cambridge and graduated BA in 1716, and MA in 1719.

He was appointed to the second stall in St George's Chapel, Windsor Castle in 1739, and held the stall until 1750.
