= John Corynham =

John Corynham (or Coringham) (d. 1444) was a Canon of Windsor from 1416 to 1444.

== Career ==
He was appointed:

- Rector of Campsall 1405
- Warden of the Free Chapel of St Mary, Jesmond, Newcastle upon Tyne
- Warden of the Free Chapel of St Thomas the Martyr, Bedford bridge, (diocese of Lincoln) 1413 - 1416
- Rector of Clewer, Berkshire
- Registrar of the Order of the Garter
- Treasurer 1426
- Rector of St Michael-le-Querne, London 1435.

He was appointed to the third stall in St George's Chapel, Windsor Castle in 1416 and held the canonry until 1444.
