= John Drury (canon of Windsor) =

John Drury (Drewery, alias Salisbury) (d. 1446) was a Canon of Windsor from 1442 to 1446.

== Career ==
He was appointed:

- Vicar of Northall, Middlesex 1386
- Rector of Stanford Rivers and Dengy, Essex
- Rector of Bishops Stortford, Hertfordshire
- Rector of Kilmersdon
- Precentor of St Paul's Cathedral 1397 - 1442
- Prebendary of Neasden in St Paul's 1400 - 1442
- Prebendary of Exeter

He was appointed to the twelfth stall in St George's Chapel, Windsor Castle in 1442, and held the stall until 1446.
