= Alexander Lee (priest) =

Alexander Lee (also Leigh) (d. ca. 1503) was a Canon of Windsor from 1469 to 1480.

== Career ==
He was King's Scholar at Eton College, then educated at King's College, Cambridge where he graduated BA, MA and LLD.

He was for some years the King's resident ambassador in Scotland.

He was appointed:

- Rector of Fen Ditton, Cambridgeshire 1468 - 1473
- Almoner to King Edward IV
- Prebendary of York 1471 - 1501
- Rector of St Bride's Church 1471 - 1485
- Prebendary of Barneby, Howden, 1478
- Prebendary of Ripon 1481 - 1491
- Rector of Spofforth 1481 - 1499
- Temporal Chancellor of Durham Cathedral 1490
- Rector of Houghton-le-Spring 1490 - 1500

He was appointed to the eleventh stall in St George's Chapel, Windsor Castle in 1469 and held the canonry until 1480.
