= Richard Bowyer (priest) =

Canon of Windsor (died 1471)

Richard Bowyer (died 12 May 1471) was a Canon of Windsor from 1459 to 1471

== Career ==
He was appointed:

- Rector of Chingford, Essex
- Prebendary of Morehall in the collegiate church of Gnosall 1452–1461
- Rector of St Mildred Poultry 1455–1471
- Chaplain within the Household.

He was appointed to the fifth stall in St George's Chapel, Windsor Castle in 1459, a position he held until 1471.
