= George Mason (priest) =

English priest (d. 1562)

George Mason (died 1562) was a Canon of Windsor from 1560 to 1562.

== Career ==
He was appointed:

- Rector of St Mary, Matfellon, Whitechapel 1553–1555
- Rector of Bradwell-juxta-Mare, Essex
- Rector of St Mary Abchurch 1555–1556
- Vicar of St Mary's Church, Luton 1558–1562
- Chaplain of the Queen's Chapel Royal

He was appointed to the twelfth stall in St George's Chapel, Windsor Castle in 1560, and held the stall until 1562.
