= Charles Digby =

Charles Digby M.A. (31 May 1775 – 26 May 1841) was a Canon of Windsor from 1808 to 1841.

== Early life ==
Digby was born on 31 May 1775, the son of Colonel Hon. Stephen Digby and Lady Lucy Fox-Strangways. He was educated at St Mary Hall, Oxford where he graduated BA in 1798 and MA in 1801.

== Career ==
Digby was appointed Rector of Middle Chinnock, Somerset in 1807, Rector of Chisleborough with West Chinnock in 1807, Rector of Bishops Caundle, Dorset in 1810. He was appointed to the second stall in St George's Chapel, Windsor Castle in 1808, and held the stall until 1841.

== Personal life ==
On 8 June 1801 Digby married Mary Somerville, daughter of Lt.-Col. Hon. Hugh Somerville and Mary Digby. They had two children: Charles Wriothesly Digby (2 May 1802 - 29 December 1873) and Captain George Somerville Digby (27 September 1805 - 16 November 1864).
