= Miles Welles =

English priest

Miles Welles (also Wyllen) (fl. 1530s) was a Canon of Windsor from 1526 to 1535.

== Career ==
He was appointed:

- Prebendary of Woodforth in Salisbury 1524
- Rector of King's Chapel in the Tower of London in 1526
- King's Chaplain
- Vicar of Stepney 1534
- Rector of Guynes 1535
- Rector of Willingham 1535
- Master of the Hospital of Newton Carth, Yorkshire 1535

He was appointed to the first stall in St George's Chapel, Windsor Castle in 1526, and held the stall until 1535. He was imprisoned in the Tower for treason in 1535, and pardoned in 1536 - 7.
