= Thomas Browne (Canon of Windsor) =

English priest (c. 1605–1673)

Thomas Browne D.D. (c. 1605 – 6 December 1673) was a Canon of Windsor from 1639 to 1673.

== Career ==
He was educated at Christ Church, Oxford, and was senior proctor in 1636.

He was appointed:

- Rector of St Mary Aldermary 1638–1641
- Rector of Oddington, Oxfordshire 1640
- Domestic chaplain to Archbishop Laud and King Charles I
- Domestic chaplain to Mary Princess of Orange during the Commonwealth period.

He was appointed to the first stall in St George's Chapel, Windsor Castle, in 1639, and held the stall until 1673. He was buried in the chapel.

== Works ==
Browne wrote:

- Tomus alter et idem, a History of the Life and Reign of that famous Princess Elizabeth, a translation of vol. ii. of William Camden's Annals, to which he added an "Appendix containing animadversions upon several passages", 1629;
- Concio ad Clerum, or A Discourse of the Revenues of the Clergy … in a sermon preached … before the university upon taking a B.D. degree 8 June 1637, preserved in The Present State of Letters; *A Key to the King's Cabinet, or Animadversions upon the three printed Speeches of Mr. L'Isle, Mr. Tate, and Mr. Browne, spoken in London, 3 July 1645, Oxford, 1645;
- A Treatise in defence of Hugo Grotius, Hague, 1646;
- Dissertatio de Therapeuticis Philonis, published with The Interpretation of the Two Books of Clement by other writers, 1689.

Isaac Vossius was Browne's major legatee, and his papers went to Amsterdam and Leiden.

== Notes ==
Attribution

This article incorporates text from a publication now in the public domain: Hunt, William (1886). "Browne, Thomas (1604?-1673)". In Stephen, Leslie (ed.). Dictionary of National Biography. Vol. 7. London: Smith, Elder & Co.
