= Alexander Southayke =

Alexander Southayke BD (died 1606) was a Canon of Windsor from 1586 to 1606.

== Career ==
He was educated at Trinity College, Cambridge and graduated BA in 1571, MA in 1574 and BD in 1581.

He was appointed:

- Rector of Waddington, Lincolnshire 1588

He was appointed to the fourth stall in St George's Chapel, Windsor Castle in 1586 and held the canonry until 1606.
