= John Meresden =

John Meresden MD DD (died 7 January 1424 or 1425) was a Canon of Windsor from 1413 to 1425.

== Career ==
He was appointed:

- Rector of Thurcaston, Lincolnshire

He was appointed to the first stall in St George's Chapel, Windsor Castle in 1413 and held the canonry until 1425.
