= John Oxenbridge (priest) =

English priest, Canon of Windsor (d. 1522)

John Oxenbridge LL.D. (died 25 July 1522) was a Canon of Windsor from 1509 to 1522.

== Family ==
He was the son of Robert Oxenbridge and Anne Lyvelode.

== Career ==
He was educated at the University of Valencia and graduated LL.B. in 1498 and LL.D by 1499.

He was appointed:

- Prebendary of Hampstead in Chichester Cathedral 1499
- Commissary and Sequestrator-General for the Bishop of Chichester in the Archdeaconry of Lewes 1498
- Vicar of Icklesham (resigned 1505)
- Vicar of Cullompton, Devon until 1522
- Vicar of Shillington, Bedfordshire 1505
- King's Clerk

He was appointed to the twelfth stall in St George's Chapel, Windsor Castle in 1509, and held the stall until 1522. A chantry was built in the chapel in his memory under the fifth arch in the south aisle of the choir. Over the door is a lion rampant, with escalope round him, with the rebus of the founder's name; an Ox, the letter N and a bridge.
