= Daniel Collins (priest) =

Daniel Collins STP (died 29 March 1648) was a Canon of Windsor from 1631 to 1648.

== Career ==
He was educated at Eton College and King's College, Cambridge and graduated BA in 1599, MA in 1601, BD in 1609 and DD in 1626.

He was appointed:

- Lecturer at Tring, Reader in Divinity at Ruislip
- Rector of Puttenham, Hertfordshire 1610
- Lecturer at Windsor
- Chaplain to King Charles I
- Fellow of Eton 1616 - 1648 and Vicar Provost
- Vicar of Ruislip 1617 - 1633, and 1640 - 1641
- Rector of Cowley, Middlesex 1629 - 1648
- Vicar of Mapledurham 1635 - 1637

He was appointed to the sixth stall in St George's Chapel, Windsor Castle in 1631 and held the canonry until 1648.
