= Thomas Hanley =

English cleric (fl. 1410s)

Thomas Hanley (fl. 1410s) was a Canon of Windsor from 1412 to 1413 and Dean of Tetenhale.

== Career ==
He was appointed:

- Dean of Tetenhale

He was appointed to the first stall in St George's Chapel, Windsor Castle in 1412 and held the canonry until 1413.
