= George Gillingham =

Canon of Windsor

George Gillingham DD (d. 16 December 1668) was a Canon of Windsor from 1639 - 1668.

== Career ==
He was educated at Broadgates Hall, Oxford where he graduated BA 1614 and MA in 1617. He was awarded DD from Pembroke College, Oxford in 1636.

He was appointed:

- Rector of Ging Hospital (Fryerning), Essex 1630
- Rector of Chalton with Clanfield, Hampshire 1633 - 1668
- Chaplain to King Charles I

He was appointed to the twelfth stall in St George's Chapel, Windsor Castle in 1639, despite being ejected in 1644 and effectively unable to function as a Canon, he held the stall until 1668.
