= Balthasar Regis =

Balthasar Regis (died 1757) was a Canon of Windsor from 1751 to 1757.

== Family ==
He was born in the province of Dauphiné, and fled France with his father following persecution for his Reformed faith.

== Career ==
He was incorporated Bachelor of Divinity in Cambridge in 1717, from Trinity College, Dublin. He subscribed for Doctor of Divinity in 1721.

He was Rector of Holy Innocents Church, Adisham, Kent from 1715 - 1757, and Rector of Little Mongeham from 1719 - 1757. He was appointed Chaplain to the King in 1727, a position he held until his death. He was appointed to the first stall in St George's Chapel, Windsor Castle in 1751.

He was buried in the chapel in 1757.
