= Adam de Hertyngdon =

Adam de Hertyngdon (also Hartington or Hertington) (d. 1380) was Archdeacon of London from 1362 to 1368 and a Canon of Windsor from 1368 to 1379.

== Career ==
He was ordained sub-deacon at Chelmsford in the diocese of Winchester by Simon Sudbury on 24 September 1362.

He was appointed:

- Prebendary of Hastings 1362
- Archdeacon of London 1362–1368
- Clerk of the Works at Windsor 1365
- Warwick Chamberlain in the Exchequer 1369–1376
- Prebendary of Willesden in St Paul’s Cathedral 1375
- Prebendary of Wells Cathedral
- Prebendary of Exeter Cathedral
- Prebendary of Netherbury in Ecclesia in Salisbury Cathedral 1377
- Prebendary of Romsey Abbey
- Dean of Stafford 1376

He was appointed to the eighth stall in St George's Chapel, Windsor Castle in 1368 but hold held it for 5 months, when he swapped it for the second stall. He resigned in 1376 but was reappointed later in the same year.
