= John Northampton (priest) =

John Northampton (died 1361) was a Canon of Windsor from 1352 to 1355.

== Career ==
He was appointed:

- Attorney in England of the Abbot of Cluny, Audrouin de La Roche, 1355
- Purveyor of the Buttery 1361

He was appointed to the eleventh stall in St George's Chapel, Windsor Castle in 1352 and held the canonry until 1355.
