= Henry Williams (priest) =

16th-century English canon of Windsor

Henry Williams BD
- Education: Oxford (BA, MA, BD)
- Occupation: priest
- Known for: Canon of Windsor (1537–1554)

Henry Williams BD (fl. 1510s–1550s) was a canon of Windsor from 1537 to 1554.

== Career ==
He was educated in Oxford and graduated BA in 1515, MA in 1521, and BD in 1531.

He was appointed:

- Prebendary of North Muskham in Southwell 1533
- Prebendary of Bedminster and Redcliffe in Salisbury 1535
- Prebendary of York 1535
- Prebendary of Lincoln 1535
- Rector of West Ilsley

He was appointed to the tenth stall in St George's Chapel, Windsor Castle in 1537 and held the canonry until 1554. His date of death is not recorded and he may have been deprived of his living as a reformer.
