= John Heaver =

John Heaver DD (d. 23 June 1670) was a Canon of Windsor from 1662 to 1670.

== Career ==
Heaver was educated at Clare College, Cambridge and awarded a BA degree in 1640, MA in 1643 and DD in 1661.

He was a Fellow of Eton College during 1661–1670. He was appointed to the ninth stall in St George's Chapel, Windsor Castle in 1662, a position he held until 1670.

In his will, Heaver left £100 to give apprenticeships to poor children in Windsor. He also left £700 to the rebuilding of Clare College, Cambridge.
