= John Somer (footballer) =

Australian rules footballer

Jack Somer

Personal information
- Full name: John Arthur Somer
- Born: 22 April 1891; Sale, Victoria
- Died: 17 September 1939 (aged 48); Prahran, Victoria
- Original team: Sandringham
- Height: 174 cm (5 ft 9 in)
- Weight: 67 kg (148 lb)

Playing career^{1}
Years	Club	Games (Goals)
1911	St Kilda	1 (0)
1911	Collingwood	1 (0)
Total		2 (0)
- ^{1} Playing statistics correct to the end of 1911.

John Arthur Somer (22 April 1891 – 17 September 1939) was an Australian rules footballer who played with St Kilda and Collingwood in the Victorian Football League (VFL).
