= William Wilson (canon of Windsor) =

English Anglican priest (1545–1615)

William Wilson DD (1545 – 15 May 1615) was a Canon of Windsor from 1584 to 1615 and Chancellor of St Paul's Cathedral from 1596 to 1615.

== Career ==
He was educated at Merton College, Oxford and graduated BA in 1564, MA in 1570, BD in 1576 and DD in 1607.

He was appointed:

- Rector of Islip, Oxford 1578
- Chaplain to the Archbishop of Canterbury
- Prebendary of Rochester 1591
- Rector of Cliffe, Kent
- Chancellor of St Paul's Cathedral 1596 - 1615
- Prebendary of Ealdstreet in St Paul's 1615.

He was appointed to the third stall in St George's Chapel, Windsor Castle in 1584 and held the canonry until 1615.
