= Thomas Horne (priest) =

Thomas Horne DD (d. 4 November 1636) was a Canon of Windsor from 1616 to 1636.

== Career ==
He was educated at Magdalen Hall, Oxford where he graduated BA in 1594, and then Merton College, Oxford where he graduated MA in 1601, BD in 1616 and DD in 1625.

He was appointed:

- Rector of Methley, Yorkshire 1615
- Vicar of Isleworth 1622
- Rector of Farnham Royal 1629

He was appointed to the eleventh stall in St George's Chapel, Windsor Castle in 1616 and held the canonry until 1636. He was buried in the chapel.
