= Anthony Barker (priest) =

Anthony Barker MA (d. 1551) was a Canon of Windsor from 1541 - 1551.

== Career ==
He was educated at Corpus Christi College, Oxford and graduated MA in 1523.

He was appointed:

- Rector of Wroughton, Wiltshire 1530
- Vicar of West Ham, Essex 1538
- Vicar of Binford, Oxford 1542
- Vicar of Burfield, Berkshire 1547
- Prebendary of Winchester
- Prebendary of Lincoln 1540

He was appointed to the twelfth stall in St George's Chapel, Windsor Castle in 1541, and held the stall until 1551.
