= Thomas Goddard (priest) =

Canon of Windsor

Thomas Goddard MA (1674 – 10 May 1731) was a Canon of Windsor from 1707 to 1731.

He was born in 1674, the son of Edward Goddard of Tidworth, Wiltshire.

Goddard was educated at St Mary Hall, Oxford and Magdalen College, Oxford where he graduated BA in 1692, and MA in 1705.

He was appointed:

- Rector of North Wraxall, Wiltshire, 1697 to 1708
- Rector of North Tidworth, Wiltshire, 1708 to 1731
- Rector of St Benet Fink, City of London, 1725

He was appointed to the fifth stall in St George's Chapel, Windsor Castle in 1707, a position he held until he died in 1737.
