= Tom Oates (sportswriter) =

American sportswriter

Tom Oates is an American sportswriter, employed as a columnist for the Wisconsin State Journal, in Madison, Wisconsin, and as a contributor to the newspaper's BadgerBeat weblog, which focuses on the athletic programs of the University of Wisconsin–Madison.

Oates also appears as a semi-regular guest on sports talk radio programs on ESPN Radio affiliates WAUK-AM (Milwaukee) and WTLX-FM (Madison) and is a panelist on a weekly roundtable program, Sidelines, on the regional cable television network Time Warner Cable Sports 32.
