= John Saxton (priest) =

English priest (died 1382)

John Saxton DD (d. 1382) was a Canon of Windsor from 1368 to 1382 and Precentor of Exeter.

== Career ==
He was appointed:

- King's Clerk
- Provost of Wingham collegiate church 1368
- Precentor of Exeter 1732

He was appointed to the fifth stall in St George's Chapel, Windsor Castle in 1368 and held the canonry until 1382.
