= Robert Felton (priest) =

Robert Felton (died 1438) was a Canon of Windsor from 1428 to 1432.

== Career ==
He was appointed:

- Prebendary of St Stephen's Westminster 1423 - 1438
- Rector of St Vedast Foster Lane 1425 - 1438
- Prebendary of Bracklesham in Chichester 1432
- Almoner to Henry VI 1432
- Prebendary of Cadington Major in St Paul's 1433 - 1438

He was appointed to the eleventh stall in St George's Chapel, Windsor Castle in 1428 and held the canonry until 1432.
