= Robert Burnham (priest) =

English priest (died 1362)

Robert Burnham (or Bernham) (died 10 August 1362) was a Canon of Windsor from 1351 to 1362.

== Career ==
He was appointed:

- Rector of Middleton Cheney, Northamptonshire 1353

He was appointed to the seventh stall in St George's Chapel, Windsor Castle in 1351 and held the canonry until 1362.
