= Edmund Nuttall (priest) =

Edmund Nuttall DD (d. 1616) was a Canon of Windsor from 1602 to 1616.

== Career ==
He was educated at Pembroke College, Oxford, where he graduated with BA in 1585, an MA in 1588, and a DD in 1608.

He was appointed:

- Rector of St Mary Somerset, London, 1596–1616
- Vicar of Ruislip, 1615–1616

He was appointed to the eleventh stall in St George's Chapel, Windsor Castle in 1602, and held the canonry until his death in 1616.
