= Edward Morecroft =

Edward Morecroft (died 1580) was a Canon of Windsor from 1560 to 1580.

He was educated at Brasenose College, Oxford.

He was appointed:

- Prebendary of Hereford 1566
- Prebendary of Heathfield 1568 - 1573

He was appointed to the first stall in St George's Chapel, Windsor Castle in 1560 and held the canonry until 1580.
