= John Exton (priest) =

English priest

John Exton (died 1430) was a Canon of Windsor from 1405 to 1430

== Career ==
He was appointed:

- Prebendary of the Church of St Mary de Castro, Leicester 1404 - 1405
- Auditor of St George's Chapel, Windsor Castle 1410 - 1411

He was appointed to the sixth stall in St George's Chapel, Windsor Castle in 1404 and held the canonry until 1430.
