= Jack Sexton (footballer, born 1925) =

Australian rules footballer

Personal information
- Full name: John Charles Sexton
- Born: 13 August 1925; Kensington, Victoria
- Died: 4 March 2014 (aged 88)
- Original team: North Colts
- Height: 173 cm (5 ft 8 in)
- Weight: 68 kg (150 lb)

Playing career^{1}
Years	Club	Games (Goals)
1946	North Melbourne	4 (1)
1947–49	Port Melbourne (VFA)	47 (21)
- ^{1} Playing statistics correct to the end of 1949.

Career highlights
- 1947 VFA Premiership

John Charles Sexton (13 August 1925 – 4 March 2014) was an Australian rules footballer who played with North Melbourne in the Victorian Football League (VFL).

== World War II ==
Sexton enlisted to serve in the Royal Australian Air Force in World War II, just after his eighteenth birthday, and served until March 1946.

== Football ==
Sexton played four games for North Melbourne in the 1946 VFL season, being 20th man in the first two rounds of the season and then playing two games on the wing later in the season.

In 1947 Sexton transferred to Port Melbourne in the Victorian Football Association where he won a premiership in his first year and was a regular player for three seasons.
