= Thomas Oates (priest) =

Thomas Oates DD (died 1623) was a Canon of Windsor from 1621 to 1623.

== Career ==
He was educated at Magdalen College, Oxford where he graduated BA in 1596, MA in 1599, BD in 1609 and DD in 1618.

He was appointed:

- Domestic Chaplain to William Herbert, 3rd Earl of Pembroke 1608
- Chaplain to James I of England
- Prebendary of Chamberlainwood in St Paul's 1618 - 1623
- Rector of Stoke Hamond, Buckinghamshire
- Rector of Great Cressingham, Norfolk 1621

He was appointed to the twelfth stall in St George's Chapel, Windsor Castle in 1621, and held the stall until 1623.
