= John Eston (priest) =

15th-century English bishop

John Eston (fl. 1400s (decade) - 1420s) was a Canon of Windsor from 1406 to 1422.

== Career ==
He was appointed:

- Prebendary of East Marden in Chichester

He was appointed to the eighth stall in St George's Chapel, Windsor Castle in 1406 and held the canonry until 1422.
