= Henry Drayton (priest) =

Henry Drayton (fl. 1410s - 1430s) was a Canon of Windsor from 1411 to 1413.

== Career ==
He was appointed:

- Vicar of West Drayton
- Rector of Hilgay, Norfolk
- Custos of the Free Chapel of St Radegund in St Paul's Cathedral 1407
- Rector of St Giles-without-Cripplegate 1407
- Rector of St Pancras Old Church 1434

He was appointed to the fourth stall in St George's Chapel, Windsor Castle in 1411, and held the stall until 1413.
