= Champagne (disambiguation) =

Champagne is a sparkling wine from the Champagne region of France.

Champagne may also refer to:

== Places ==
=== Regions ===
- Champagne (province), an historic province in the Kingdom of France from 1314 to 1790
- Champagne wine region, a wine region in France notable for producing the sparkling wine
- Champagne-Ardenne, an administrative region of France from 1956 to 2015 (now part of Grand Est)
- County of Champagne, a medieval principality in France
- Grande Champagne, a cognac-producing region in France
- Petite Champagne, a cognac-producing region in France
- Champagne Berrichonne, a region in the historic French province of Berry (now Indre and Cher)

=== Municipalities ===
- Champagne, Ardèche, a municipality in France
- Champagne, Charente-Maritime, a municipality in France
- Champagne, Eure-et-Loir, a municipality in France
- Champagne, Switzerland, a municipality in the district of Jura-Nord Vaudois, in the canton of Vaud, in Switzerland
- Champagne-au-Mont-d'Or, a municipality in Francein the Rhône département, in France
- Champagne-en-Valromey, a municipality in the Ain département, in France
- Champagne-et-Fontaine, a municipality in the Dordogne département, in France
- Champagne-Mouton, a municipality in the Charente département, in France
- Champagne-sur-Loue, a municipality in the Jura département, in France
- Champagne-sur-Oise, a municipality in the Val-d'Oise département, in France
- Champagne-sur-Seine, a municipality in the Seine-et-Marne département, in France
- Champagne-sur-Vingeanne, a municipality in the Côte-d'Or département, in France
- Champagne-Vigny, a municipality in the Charente département, in France

=== Other places ===
- Champagne Castle, a mountain in South Africa
- Champagne and Aishihik First Nations, an indigenous group in Canada
- Champagne Berrichonne

== Arts, entertainment, and media ==
=== Films ===
- Champagne (1928 film), a 1928 film by Alfred Hitchcock
- Champagne (2014 film), a film by Emem Isong, starring Majid Michel and Alexx Ekubo

=== Television ===
- Champagne (TV series), a 1983 Brazilian telenovela

=== Music ===
==== Songs ====
- "Champagne" (Cavo song), 2009
- "Champagne" (Peppino di Capri song), 1973
- "Champagne" (Salt-n-Pepa song), 1996
- "Champagne", a song from the musical In the Heights
- "Champagne", a song from the film Tommy
- "Champagne", a song by Big Audio Dynamite from Tighten Up, Vol. 88
- "Champagne", a song by James Barker Band from Ahead of Our Time, 2023
- "Champagne", a song by Kenny G from Duotones, 1986
- "Champagne", a song by K.Flay from Every Where Is Some Where, 2017
- "Champagne", a song by Chris Rock from Roll with the New, 1997
- "Champagne", a song by Hervé Vilard, 1975
- "Champagne", a song by KSI and Randolph from the 2019 album New Age
- "Champagne", a song by 311 from the 2001 album From Chaos
- "Champagne, Champagne", a 2001 song by Vanessa Amorosi
- "Champagne?", a song by Joe Satriani from the album Engines of Creation, 2000

==== Other uses in music ====
- Champagne (album), a 2002 album by José Luis Rodríguez
- Champagne (band), a Japanese rock band (now called Alexandros)
- Champagne (Miss Kittin & The Hacker EP), 1998
- Champagne, an EP by My Brightest Diamond

== Battles ==
- First Battle of Champagne (December 1914 – March 1915)
- Second Battle of Champagne (September–October 1915)
- Third Battle of Champagne, better known as the Second Battle of the Aisne (April 1917)

== Beverages ==
- Champagne soda, a type of carbonated beverage
- Sparkling wine, when used as a semi-generic term for wines made outside the Champagne region

== People with the name ==
- Champagne (surname)
- Avishai Raviv, codename "Champagne", Israeli spy
- Evelyn "Champagne" King (born July 1, 1960), an American singer, songwriter, and record producer

== Other uses ==
- Champagne (advertisement), a banned advertisement created by Microsoft to promote the Xbox in Europe
- Champagne Classic (BRC), a Brisbane Racing Club 2-year-old Thoroughbred horse race
- Champagne (color)
- Champagne fairs, medieval trade fairs
- Champagne flute, a form of stemware designed specifically to enhance the drinking of champagne
- Champagne gene, a horse colour dilution gene
- Champagne (grape), another name for the Italian wine grape Marzemina bianca
- La Champagne, a fishing trawler, formerly the steam yacht White Ladye

== See also ==
- Champagné (disambiguation)
- Champaign (disambiguation)
- Champange (disambiguation)
- "Shampain", a 2010 song by Marina and the Diamonds
