= Iryna Somer =

Ukrainian journalist

Iryna Somer (Ukrainian: Ірина Сомер; born April 9, 1970) (Note: Also known in Ukraine as Iryna Khokhlova.) is a Ukrainian journalist who specializes in international issues, mainly the European Union and NATO.

== Early life ==
Somer was born on April 9, 1970, in Zhytomyr, Ukraine. In 1993, she graduated from the University of Zhytomyr with a degree in philology.

== Career ==
After graduation, she joined the Zhytomyr Literary Museum as a research assistant. Her research of the romantic relationship of the outstanding Ukrainian poet Oleksandr Olesya with his future wife Vera Svadkovskaya, who once lived in Zhytomyr, was published in the journal “Word and Time” (“Cлово і Час”). City radio interviewed Somer on this topic and in 1994 she was invited to work there as a correspondent. In 1996, her radio report was heard by the editor-in-chief of the largest regional newspaper Echo, who invited her to work there.

In 1998, the trial of the serial killer Anatoly Onoprienko, who was accused of killing 52 people, including children, began in Zhytomyr. Somer covered the process not only for the Echo newspaper, but also for the country's leading mass media, in particular, for the Interfax-Ukraine news agency. After the trial she interviewed Onoprienko in jail.

In 1999, at the invitation of the Interfax-Ukraine, she began working as a correspondent, covering events related to issues of national security and defence (Ministry of Internal Affairs, Ministry of Defence, GPU, NATO, National Security and Defence Council). In 2000, she covered the first NATO civil emergency exercise in Ukraine. Her interviewees include Secretary General of NATO, Rasmussen (2014), Stoltenberg (2017), Vice President of the European Commission Dombrovskis (2017), EU Trade Commissioner Malmström (2015), and others.

In 2004, she was recognized as the best political correspondent of Interfax Information Services Group in the CIS countries, and in 2011 she was awarded a diploma of the Ministry of Foreign Affairs of Ukraine for covering the country's foreign policy.

Since 2005, she has been based in Belgium, where the headquarters of NATO and the European Union are located, first as a correspondent for News Agency Interfax-Ukraine where she worked since 1998, and then, in 2014-2018, for News Agency UNIAN. She also contributed to the BBC Ukrainian service, Deutsche Welle Ukrainian service. For a short period of time she was a contributor to the Kyiv Post newspaper, and from February 2019 she is again with Interfax-Ukraine and one of the popular Ukrainian media resource “LB”. She has covered many international events, including the annual Munich Security Conference, NATO and EU summits, peace talks in the Normandy Format, events regarding downing flight MH17 and cases in the International Crime Court.

== Awards ==
By a decree of President Poroshenko in 2017, for her personal contribution to the implementation of Euro-Atlantic aspiration of Ukraine, for the introduction of a visa-free regime with the EU, for many years of fruitful work and high professionalism, she was awarded the Order of Merit, 3 degrees.
