= Thomas Hinton (priest) =

English priest (died 1757)

Thomas Hinton (died 3 September 1757) was a Canon of Windsor from 1751 to 1757

== Career ==
He was appointed:

- Assistant curate of St Chad's Church, Lichfield
- Vicar of Hartley Westpall, Hampshire 1753 - 1757

He was appointed to the second stall in St George's Chapel, Windsor Castle in 1751, and held the stall until 1757.
