= John Mesnard =

John Mesnard (also Meynard) DD (died 26 August 1727) was a Canon of Windsor from 1689 to 1727

== Family ==
His wife was Louisa, and they had three children:

- Mary Mesnard
- Susan Mesnard
- Peter Mesnard

== Career ==
He was a minister with the Reformed Church of Paris at Charenton for 16 years before coming to England with William, Prince of Orange. He was created DD at Oxford.

He was appointed to the ninth stall in St George's Chapel, Windsor Castle in 1689, a position he held until 1727.
