= George Whitehorne =

George Whitehorne (died 1565) was a Canon of Windsor from 1559 to 1565.

== Career ==
He was appointed:

- Minor Canon and Priest-Vicar of St George's Chapel, Windsor Castle 1541 - 1565
- Vicar of Ruislip until 1554, returned 1559.

He was appointed to the sixth stall in St George's Chapel, Windsor Castle in 1559 and held the canonry until 1565.
