= William Langford (priest) =

William Langford DD (d. 21 January 1814) was a Canon of Windsor from 1787 to 1814.

== Career ==
He was educated at King's College, Cambridge.

He was appointed:

- Lower Master (Ostiarius) of Eton College 1775
- Prebendary of the 3rd stall at Worcester 1785 - 1787
- Vicar of Nether Stowey, 1796
- Rector of Newdigate, Surrey
- Vicar of Isleworth 1801
- Fellow of Eton

He was appointed to the fifth stall in St George's Chapel, Windsor Castle in 1787 and held the canonry until 1814.
