= John Somer (canon) =

John Somer BD (d. 28 November 1573) was a Canon of Windsor from 1554 to 1573

== Career ==
He was appointed:

- Rector of Stanlake, Oxford 1542
- Rector of Stoke Hammond, Buckinghamshire 1565
- Prebendary of Lincoln 1546

He was appointed to the eighth stall in St George's Chapel, Windsor Castle in 1554 and held the canonry until 1573.
