= Erasmus Saunders (priest, died 1775) =

Erasmus Saunders D.D. (d. 23 December 1775) was a Canon of Windsor from 1751 to 1756.

== Family ==
He was the son of Erasmus Saunders, Canon of Brecon. He married Mary Kenrick and they had three children:

- Martha Saunders (b. 1757)
- Erasmus Saunders (b. 1759)
- Kenrick Francis Saunders (b. 1764)

He died in 1775 and was buried in the south aisle of Bath Abbey.

== Career ==
He was educated at Merton College, Oxford and graduated BA in 1737, MA in 1740, BD in 1751 and DD in 1753.

He was appointed:

- Vicar of Wantage, Berkshire 1755
- Prebendary of Rochester 1756
- Vicar of St Martin-in-the-Fields 1756 - 1775
- Vicar of Mapiscome, Kent 1757

He was appointed to the tenth stall in St George's Chapel, Windsor Castle in 1751 and held the canonry until 1756.
