= Samuel Baker (divine) =

Church of England clergyman

Samuel Baker, D.D. (died 1660), was a Church of England clergyman and divine notable for rapid promotion; an apparent softness to the Church of Rome, and, later in life, for imprisonment arising out of his apparent Catholic leanings.

Baker was matriculated as a pensioner of Christ's College, Cambridge, 11 July 1612, became B.A. in 1615–6, M.A. in 1619, and was elected a fellow of his college. On 7 May 1623 he was incorporated M.A. at Oxford, and he proceeded B.D. at Cambridge in 1627. The corporation of London presented him to the rectory of St. Margaret Pattens in that city, where he at one time enjoyed great popularity as a puritanical preacher. He was, however, 'taken off from those courses,' and made domestic chaplain to William Juxon, bishop of London. On 29 October 1636 he became prebendary of Totenhall in the church of St. Paul. Having in 1637 resigned the rectory of St. Margaret Pattens, he was, on 5 July in the same year, instituted to that of St. Mary-at-Hill. On 28 August 1638 the king conferred on him the position of canon of the First Stall at St George's Chapel, Windsor. This he resigned on 17 May 1639, and on the 20th of the same month was nominated to a canonry in the church of Canterbury. In the same year he was created D.D. In 1640 he resigned the rectory of St. Christopher in London, and on 4 April in that year became rector of South Weald in Essex. Soon after the assembling of the Long parliament he was complained of for having licensed certain books and refused his license to others, and he was subsequently sequestered from all his preferments, persecuted, and imprisoned.

Baker, who is supposed to have died in the early part of 1660, was one of the learned persons who rendered material assistance in the preparation of Bishop Walton's Polyglot Bible.
