= John Fitzwilliam (divine) =

English nonjuring divine

John Fitzwilliam, D.D. (died 1699), was an English nonjuring divine.

== Life ==
Fitzwilliam was educated at Magdalen College, Oxford, where he entered as a servitor in 1651, and was elected to a demyship in the same year. At the Restoration, according to Anthony à Wood, ‘he turned about and became a great complier to the restored liturgy.’ But Fitzwilliam himself appeals to ‘the zeal I had for the present government even while it was merely to be enjoyed in hopes, and we could only wish it might be restored’ (sermon preached in 1683). In 1661 he was elected fellow of Magdalen, and held his fellowship until 1670. He was made librarian of the college in 1662, being at the same time university lecturer on music. His first patron was Dr. George Morley, afterwards bishop of Winchester, who recommended him to the lord treasurer, Thomas Wriothesley, the virtuous earl of Southampton, in 1664, in whose family he resided as chaplain, and instructed Lady Rachel Wriothesley and her sisters. On the death of the Earl of Southampton Bishop Morley ‘took him into his own household,’ and on ‘his dismission from his service with a fair reward’ recommended him in 1666 as chaplain to the Duke of York, afterwards James II, to whose daughter, the Princess Anne, he became tutor. In 1669 he was appointed by Bishop Morley to the living of Brightstone in the Isle of Wight, on the resignation of Dr. Thomas Ken, who was collated to the living of Woodhay. He was afterwards presented by his friend, Bishop Turner of Ely, to the living of Cottenham, near Cambridge, and promoted by the crown to a canonry at Windsor in 1688. He was a friend both of Thomas Ken and of his brother-in-law, Izaak Walton, who sent him presentation copies of all his works. He was also on terms of intimacy with John Kettlewell. He attended, with Ken, Bishop Morley's deathbed in 1684. At the Revolution he resigned his preferments, because his conscience forbad him to take the oaths of allegiance to the new dynasty.

In January 1690/1691 he appeared as a witness at the trial of John Ashton, executed for a Jacobite conspiracy. It was reported that Ashton was a Roman Catholic, and Fitzwilliam testified that ‘he had received the sacrament of the Lord's supper only six months before in Ely Chapel’—that is, in the chapel at Ely House, Hatton Garden, the Bishop of Ely's London residence, which was a great resort of the nonjurors until Bishop Turner was deprived. Fitzwilliam appears to have been a regular attendant at these services, for he admits that ‘he had been a hundred times at prayers in their altered state,’ that is, when the names of King William and Queen Mary were omitted. He professed his willingness to submit peaceably, though he would not take the oaths. His correspondence with Lady Russell consists of fifty-seven letters which she wrote to him, and four or five which he wrote to her. Thomas Selwood, who edited the first edition of Lady Russell's letters in 1773, says: ‘All the letters to Dr. Fitzwilliam were by him returned in one packet to her ladyship, with his desire they might be printed for the benefit of the public.’ The correspondence indicates the greatest veneration on the part of Lady Russell for her old instructor, and a pastoral, almost a parental, solicitude on his part for his old pupil. Lady Russell consults him on the appointment of a chaplain, the education of her children, the marriage of her daughter, and, above all, her own griefs upon the execution of Lord William Russell, whom Fitzwilliam had attended before his execution, and at whose trial he was one of the witnesses for the defence. She expresses the deepest reverence for his character, and the utmost value for his counsel. After the Revolution she strove in vain to convince him that he 'might honestly submit to the present government.' Fitzwilliam's replies to her arguments show the conscientious and unselfish character of the man, and also give some insight into his life. He begs her to use her influence, not for himself, but for his parishioners, 'to get some person presented to my living, upon my resignation, in whom I may confide without any, the least capitulation, direct or indirect, beforehand. He whom I design is one Mr. Jekyl, minister of the new chapel, Westminster, and a favourite of the present government.' Anticipating that he would not be able to comply, he adds: 'I beg of your honour three things: first, that you would have the same good opinion of my integrity, and of my zealous addiction to your service, as ever you had; secondly, that you would permit me, in entire trust and confidence, to make over all my worldly goods to you; for I fear some men's hearts may drive affairs so far as to bring all remnants of it into a premunire; thirdly, that I may have some room in your house, if any can be spared, to set up my books in, and have recourse to them if, on refusal, we may be permitted to stay in town.' If Lady Russell cannot grant these last requests, he intimates that he will apply to one of her sisters, Lady Gainsborough or Lady Alington.

He died in 1699, having appointed 'my ever dear friend, and now my truly honoured father,' Dr. Ken, his sole executor under his will, with a life interest in 500 pounds, which he bequeathed to the library of Magdalen College. He also left books and manuscripts to the Bodleian Library.

== Works ==
The only publication of Fitzwilliam extant is A Sermon preached at Cotenham, near Cambridge, on 9 Sept. 1683, being the day set apart for Public Thanksgiving for deliverance of His Sacred Majesty and Government from the late Treasonable Conspiracy, that is, the Rye House Plot, for his supposed complicity in which Lord William Russell lost his life. Fitzwilliam, however, thoroughly believed in his innocence, and testified to that effect at the trial. On the anniversaries of the arrest, the trial, and the execution of her husband, Fitzwilliam always sent letters of comfort and advice to Lady Russell.

Fitzwilliam was one of the few nonjurors who are mentioned with unqualified praise by Lord Macaulay. He groups him with the saintly John Kettlewell, and thinks they are deserving of 'special mention, less on account of their abilities and learning than on account of their rare integrity, and of their not less rare candour.'
