= Richard Adolphus Musgrave =

English Anglican priest (died 1841)

Richard Adolphus Musgrave (died 21 January 1841) was an English Anglican priest who was Canon of Windsor from 1828 to 1841.

== Family ==
He was the fourth son of Sir James Musgrave, Bart of Barnsley Park, Gloucestershire.

He married Catherine Lowther, daughter of Colonel James Lowther, on 3 July 1822 in St George’s Church, Hannover Square, London.

== Career ==
He was educated at Westminster School from 1812 to 1818. He then studied at Trinity College, Cambridge, graduating LLB in 1829.

He was appointed:

- Curate at Crowell 1823
- Rector of Compton Basset, Wiltshire 1825
- Rector of Barnsley, Gloucestershire 1826–1841

He was appointed to the third stall in St George's Chapel, Windsor Castle in 1828, a position he held until 1841.
