= St Margaret, New Fish Street =

Coordinates: 51.51013°N 0.086001°W

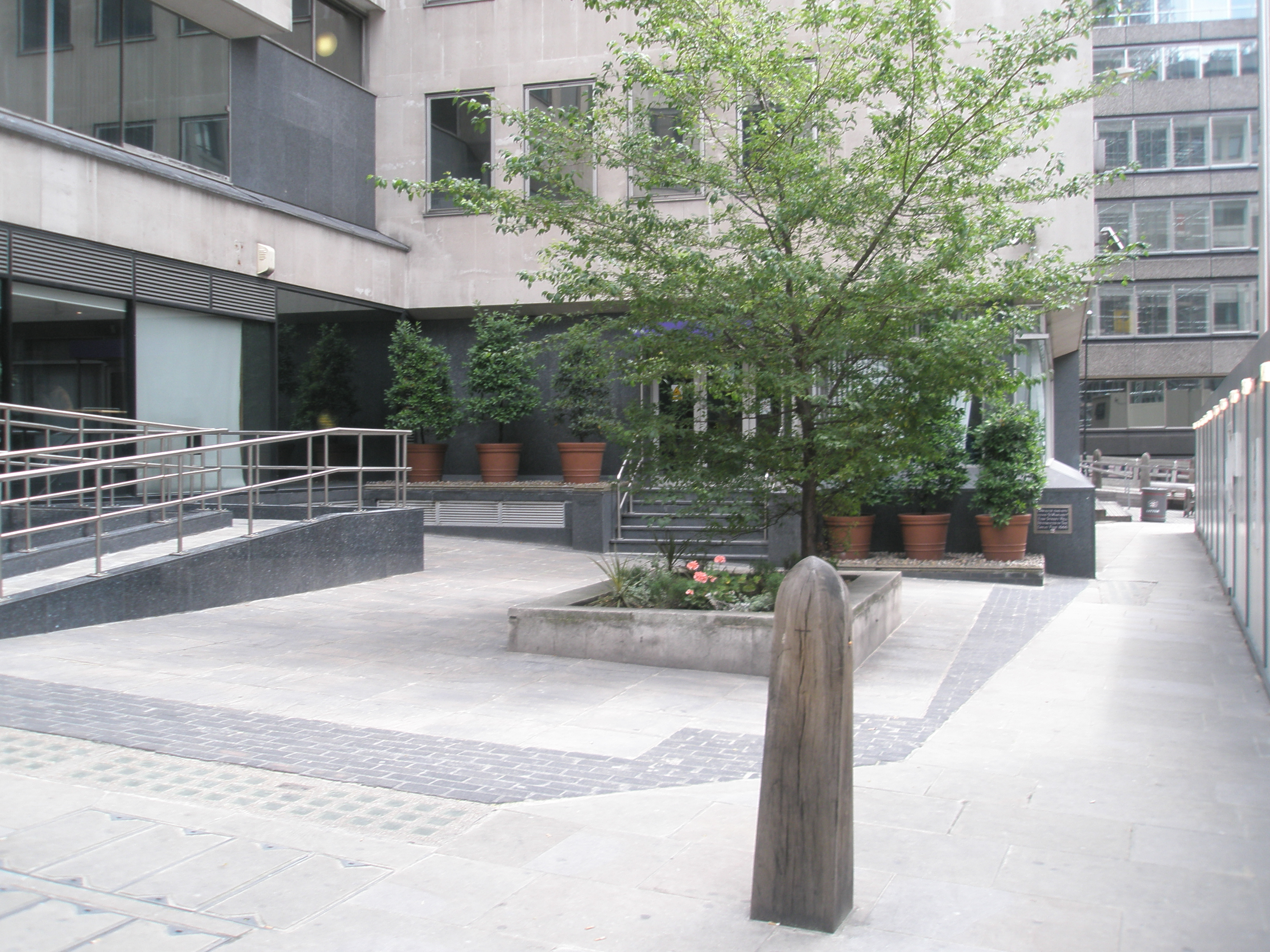
- Current photo of site
- St Margaret, New Fish Street
- Location: The Monument, City of London
- Country: England
- Denomination: Anglican

History
- Founded: 10th century

Architecture
- Demolished: 1666

St Margaret, New Fish Street, was a parish church in the City of London.

The Mortality Bill for the year 1665, published by the Parish Clerks' Company, shows 97 parishes within the City of London. By September 6 the city lay in ruins due to the Great Fire of London, with 86 churches, including St Margaret, destroyed. The Rebuilding of London Act 1670 was passed and a committee set up under the stewardship of Sir Christopher Wren to decide which would be rebuilt. Fifty-one were chosen, but St Margaret New Fish Street where the Monument now stands in Bridge ward was one of the minority never to be rebuilt.

Variously called St Margaret Bridge Street and St Margaret Fish Street Hill, it received many gifts from the pilgrims who passed it on the way to and from London Bridge.

Following the fire, it was united to St Magnus-the-Martyr.
