= Torxé =

- Commune
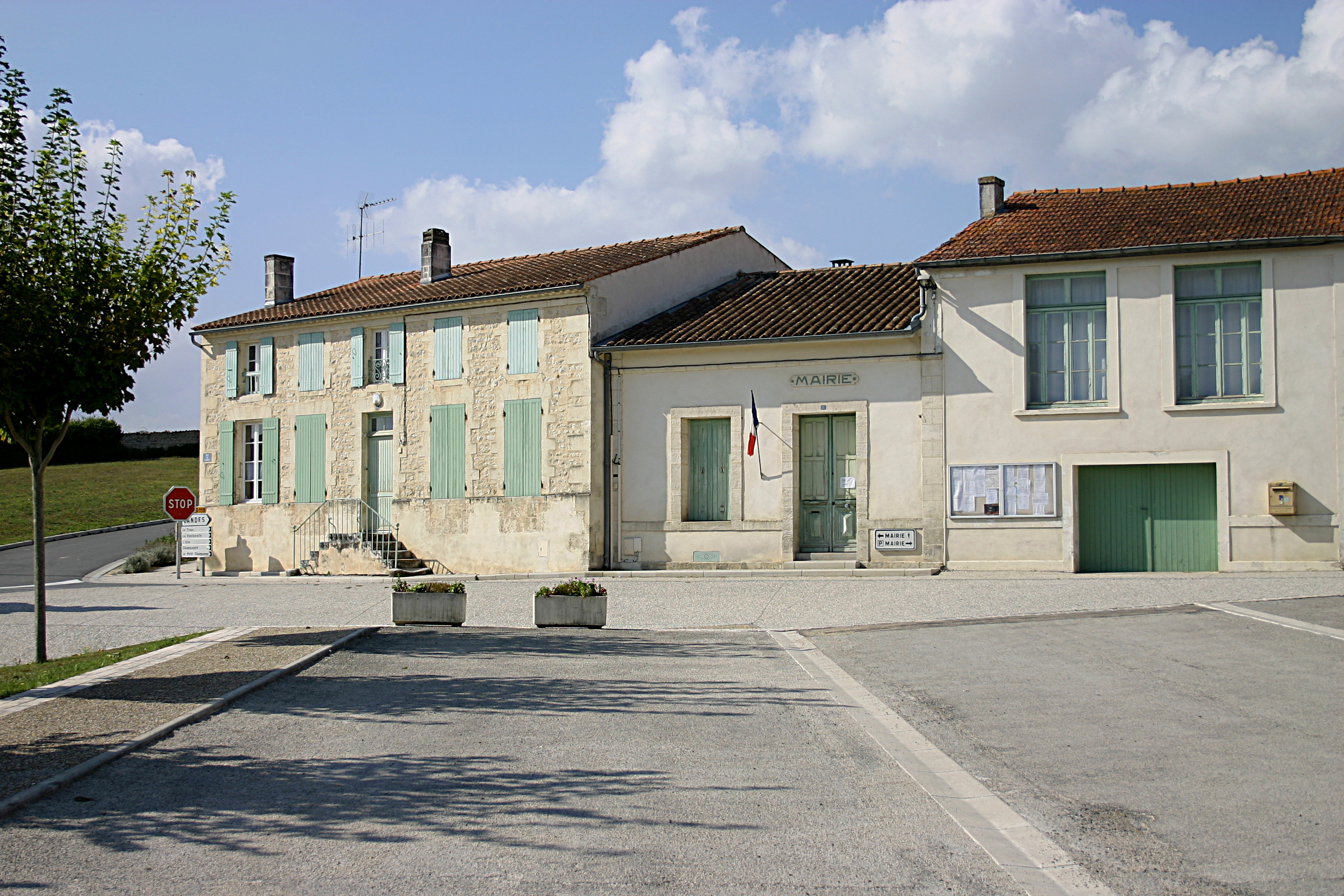
- The town hall in Torxé
- Location of Torxé
- Location within France Location within Nouvelle-Aquitaine
- Coordinates: 45°57′13″N 0°37′30″W
- Country: France
- Region: Nouvelle-Aquitaine
- Department: Charente-Maritime
- Arrondissement: Saint-Jean-d'Angély
- Canton: Saint-Jean-d'Angély

Government
  - Mayor (2020–2026): Suzette Moreau
- Area^{1}: 11.43 km^{2} (4.41 sq mi)
- Elevation: 8 m (26 ft)
- Highest elevation: 63 m (207 ft)
- Lowest elevation: 2 m (6.6 ft)
- Population (2023): 258
  - Density: 22.6/km^{2} (58.5/sq mi)
- Time zone: UTC+01:00 (CET)
  - Summer (DST): UTC+02:00 (CEST)
- INSEE/Postal code: 17450 /17380
- ^{1} French Land Register data, which excludes lakes, ponds, glaciers > 1 km^{2} (0.386 sq mi or 247 acres) and river estuaries.

Torxé (French pronunciation: [toʁ.se]) is a commune in the Charente-Maritime department in the Nouvelle-Aquitaine region in southwestern France.

== Geography ==
The river Boutonne forms most of the commune's southern border.

== Population ==
Historical population
Year	Pop.	±% p.a.
1968	272	—
1975	244	−1.54%
1982	216	−1.73%
1990	202	−0.83%
1999	233	+1.60%
2007	235	+0.11%
2012	242	+0.59%
2017	202	−3.55%
2023	258	+4.16%
Source: INSEE

- Communes of the Charente-Maritime department
