= St John the Baptist Church, Windsor =

Church in Berkshire, England

Coordinates: 51°28′55″N 0°36′22″W

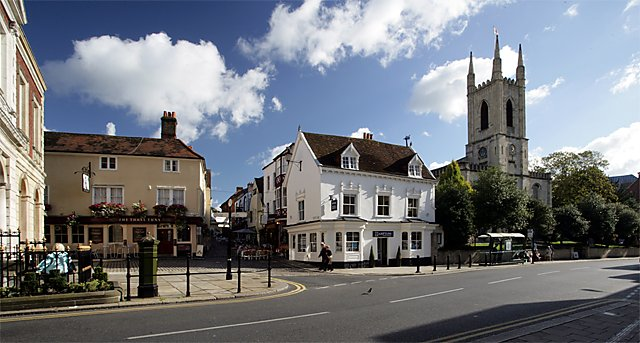
St John the Baptist church from the High Street

St John the Baptist Church is a parish church in Windsor in the English county of Berkshire. It is dedicated to St John the Baptist. The church was rebuilt in Gothic Revival style in 1822. It is the civic church of Windsor, and many Mayors of Windsor are buried in the church and churchyard. The church is Grade II* listed. Two of the three Protestant Windsor Martyrs, who were burnt at the stake in 1543, were associated with the church.

== Old church ==
The original settlement at Windsor was at what is now called Old Windsor. Henry I moved the Royal Court to the Windsor Castle site in New Windsor. There are references to the existence of St John's Church by the reign of Henry II, by which point there had been several previous incumbents. By the end of its existence, the church consisted of a nave, chancel and aisles, each under a separate gable and all flush at the east end. The poor condition of the building led to a proposal in 1818 to rebuild.

== Windsor Martyrs ==
Although Henry VIII dissolved the monasteries from 1536 to 1541 and established himself as Supreme Governor of the Church of England in place of the Pope in 1531 and 1534, Anglican doctrine during his reign remained Catholic in most respects, particularly after 1539. The Six Articles Act 1539 was described as "An Act abolishing diversity of Opinions"; it asserted transubstantiation, clerical celibacy, and auricular confession. The penalty for refusing to make confession or to take communion was death.

Anthony Pearson was a Protestant preacher, who preached in and around Windsor, including in St John's. Henry Filmer, a tailor, was Churchwarden of St John's. Filmer was much-influenced by Pearson's sermons, and sought to convince the Vicar, Thomas Meister, to adopt similar views. News of these developments reached William Simmonds, Mayor of Windsor, 1529 and 1542, and MP for Windsor, 1529–36 and 1542–44. Simmonds, together with Dr John London, Canon of Windsor, reported to Stephen Gardiner, Bishop of Winchester. Houses were searched, and arrests made of Pearson and Filmer, as well as those of Robert Testwood, a chorister at St George's Chapel, John Merbecke, the organist at St George's, and Robert Benet, a lawyer in Windsor. Benet avoided being tried by virtue of being sick with 'pestilence'. The others were tried for heresy by a jury, specially chosen to be sure to convict. Convictions were obtained, and Pearson, Filmer and Testwood were burnt at the stake on wasteland north of the castle; the site of the execution is now Windsor & Eton Riverside railway station. Merbecke, meanwhile, had been pardoned, and would go on to write a standard setting for the Anglican service of Holy Communion.

== New church ==
The new church was built in 1820–22 to a design by Charles Hollis, with Jeffry Wyatt (who would later change his name to Wyatville) acting as a consultant. It was built of large blocks of fine ashlar, with cast-iron quatrefoil columns. The nave and aisles are spanned by cast-iron trusses. Hollis's floorplan followed the outline of the old church, and many monuments and features were retained. There is a west tower with flanking vestibules, of four stages including clock and belfry stages. The body of the original Hollis church is a six-bay nave and aisles; the interior has plastered walls.

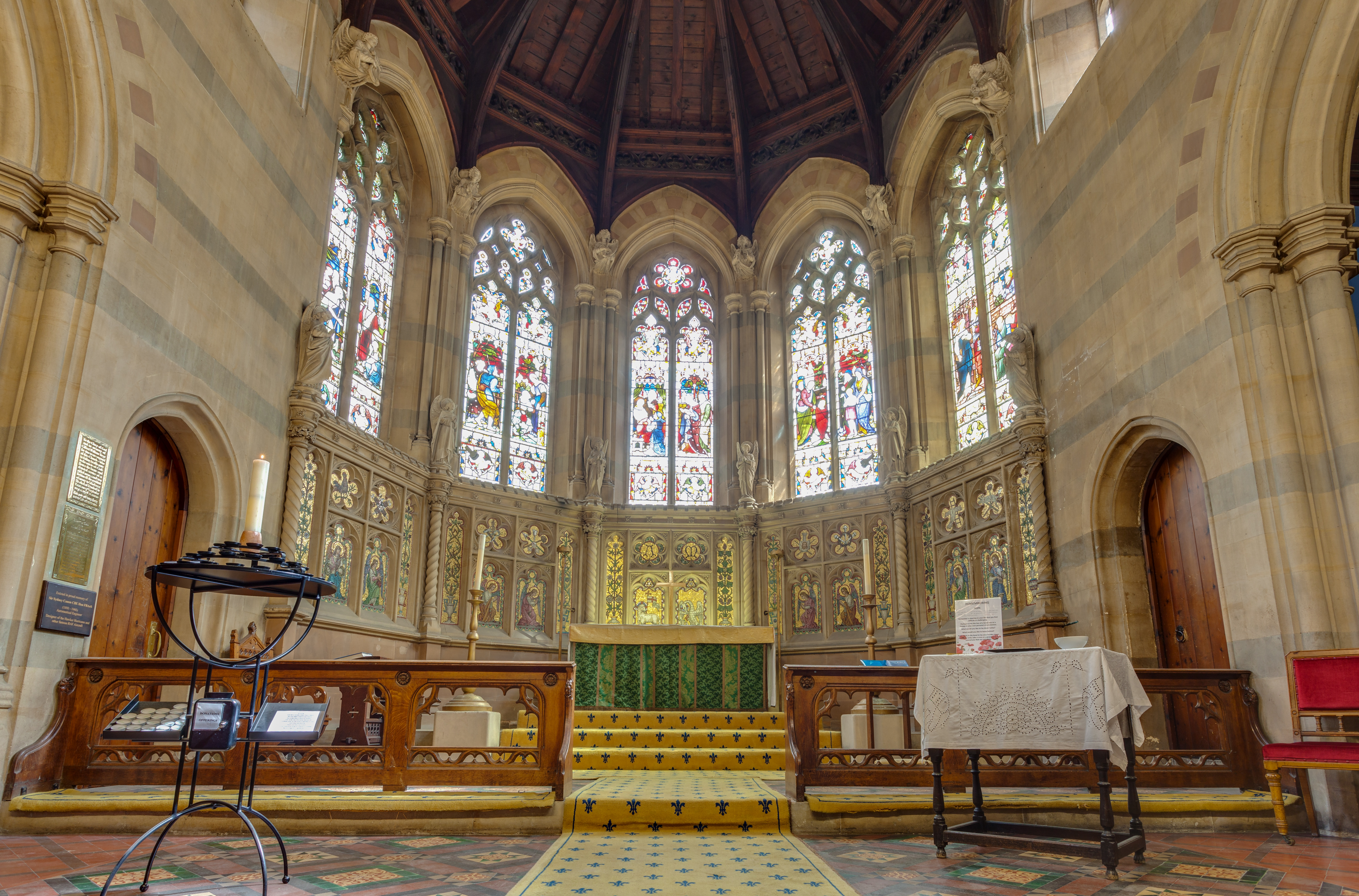
The sanctuary by Teulon at St John the Baptist church

By the late 19th century the small chancels of the Georgian era had fallen out of fashion, and the noted ecclesiastical architect Samuel Sanders Teulon was appointed to restore the church. From 1869 to 1873 Teulon worked on St John's, extending the chancel so that it then formed a semi-circular apse. Those additions are built from small squared grey stone blocks with Bath stone dressings, with chancel limestone ashlar facing on the interior. The chancel arch is framed with polychrome voussoirs, a typical Teulon feature. The church was reopened by Princess Christian.

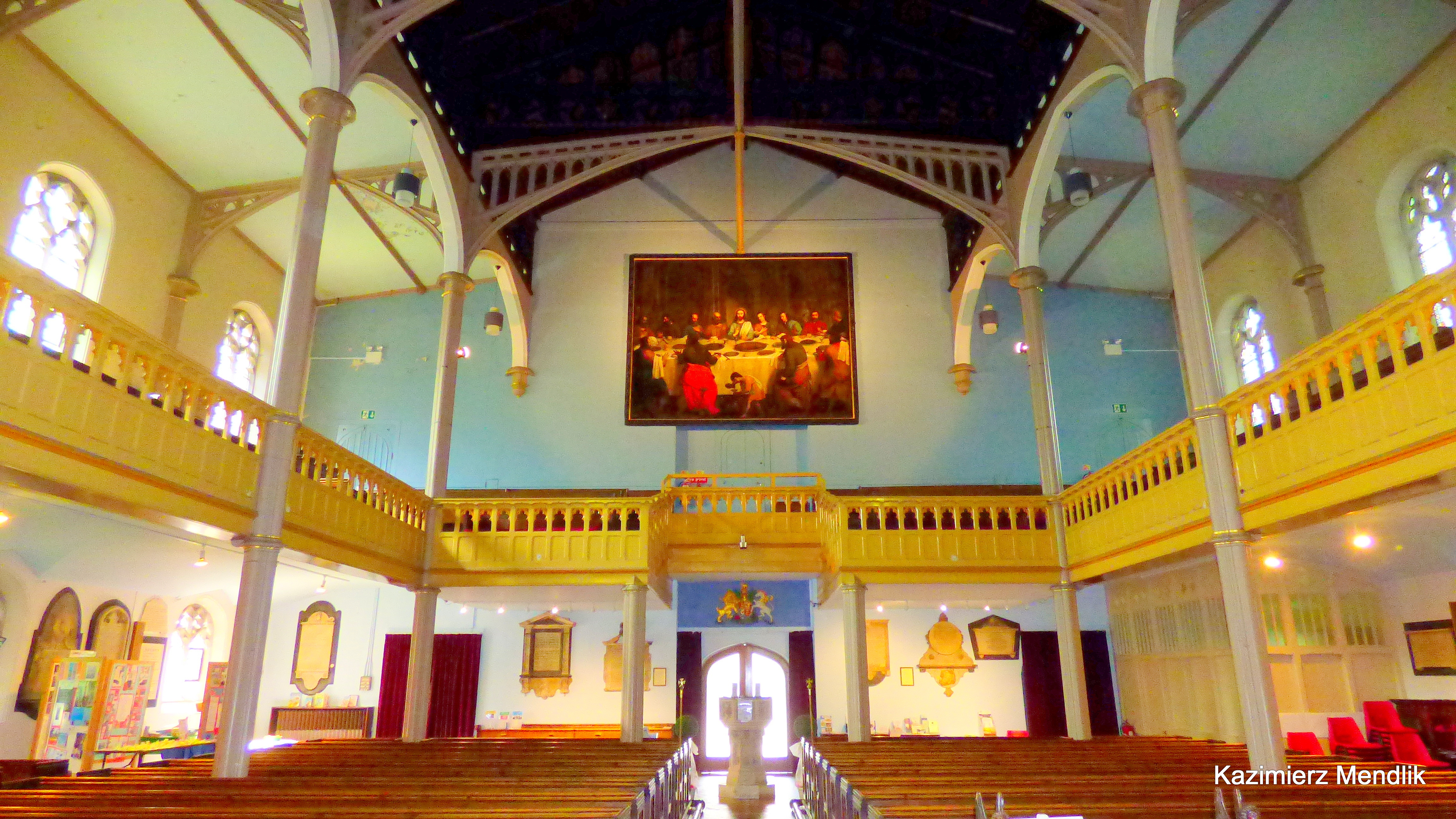
The Last Supper by Francis Cleyn on the west wall

Above the west gallery is a large painting of the Last Supper, presented to the church by George III in 1788, having previously been an altarpiece in St George's Chapel. It was installed as an altarpiece in the old church, and again in the new church, but after Teulon's erection of a circular chancel apse in 1870, it was removed to the west wall, where it remains. The painting, which is attributed to Francis Cleyn, was restored in 2003.

The church features a Royal Pew, the gift of Princess Augusta, who worshipped there. The pew is fronted by a low screen containing panels carved by Grinling Gibbons, showing a pelican feeding its young. The panels had previously formed part of the altar rail at St George's Chapel; they were given to St John's by George III along with the painting of the Last Supper in 1788. Initially they formed a composition with the Last Supper painting, but this was broken when Teulon rebuilt the chancel, installing the semi-circular apse and removing the painting to the gallery.

The church is the civic church of Windsor, and there is a mayoral pew, together with a cushion for the mayoral mace.

The reredos in the east end features mosaic panels by the Venetian glass mosaic artist Antonio Salviati. The screen in the chancel arch dates from 1898 and is by the architect Sir Arthur Blomfield. It was given as a thank offering for Queen Victoria's Diamond Jubilee in 1897.

Sketchy details are available of the earliest organs: a new organ was installed in the old church in 1633, and destroyed by Puritans in 1650. The next available detail is about the installation in 1789 of a three-manual organ built by Father Smith during the reign of Charles II (but possibly later by John Snetzler) for St George's Chapel, and then given to St John's by George III, along with the painting of the Last Supper and the Grinling Gibbons panel. That organ was retained for the new church, and re-installed in the West Gallery. In 1846 it was removed and reinstalled at St Mary, Haggerston by Gray and Davison; it was destroyed in an air raid in 1940. Its replacement was a two-manual Gray and Davison, which was transferred to Langford Methodist Church in 1906.

The replacement of the Gray and Davison organ was a three-manual Hunter organ which was half-funded by Andrew Carnegie. The organ was opened by Charles Harford Lloyd, Precentor of Eton College, on Easter Day 1906. The specification has been superseded by subsequent renovations: by Hunter from 1921 to 1926, by Rushworth and Dreaper in 1936, and by Bishop & Son in 2009. A full restoration is proposed, and the fundraising target was reached in 2020.

The church has a ring of eight bells: all were cast by the Whitechapel Bell Foundry. Four were cast by Richard Phelps in the 18th century and were retained from the old church; the other four were cast in the 1820s by Thomas Mears II for the new church.

There is a war memorial in the churchyard, which was unveiled by Princess Alice, Countess of Athlone, in 1920.

== Notable people ==
=== Notable clergy ===
The antiquary George Evans was Vicar in 1663. John Barrow, who was Canon of Windsor 1682-64 and Chaplain to Prince Rupert of the Rhine, was Vicar 1680–82. Other Vicars include Canon Henry John Ellison (1855–75), who founded the Church of England Temperance Society in 1862; his son John Henry Joshua was also Vicar (1895–1913). Between the two Ellisons, the Vicar was Richard Gee (1878–94), who was subsequently Canon of Windsor (1894–1902). The Vicar from 1913 to 1921 was Ernest Blackie, who went on to be a suffragan bishop in the Diocese of Lincoln (1930–37) and Dean of Rochester (1937–43). The Vicar from 1940 to 1958 was Ralph Creed Meredith, who was Chaplain to George VI (1946–52) and Elizabeth II (1952–62) and who had won the inaugural New Zealand National Badminton Championships in 1927 and represented New Zealand in the MacRobertson International Croquet Shield in 1930. David Nigel Griffiths was Team Rector 1973–87, whilst also being Chaplain to The Queen (1977–97) and after which he was Archdeacon of Berkshire (1987–92).

Notable curates include George Augustus Selwyn (1833–41) who became the first Bishop of New Zealand (1841–67) and then Bishop of Lichfield (1867–78). He founded the Melanesian Mission, and Selwyn College, Cambridge, is named in his honour. The hymnwriter Samuel John Stone (Curate, 1862–70) wrote The Church's One Foundation in 1866, whilst Curate at Windsor.

=== Notable organists ===
Sir George Elvey, organist of St George's Chapel, Windsor (1835–82), was also organist of St John the Baptist 1849–61; Anthony Caesar, who was subsequently ordained and went on to become Sub-Dean of the Chapels Royal and domestic chaplain to the Queen (1979–91) and was music editor of the New English Hymnal, was organist of St John the Baptist 1948–52.

=== Notable burials and memorials ===
There are numerous notable burials in the churchyard or in the church; some (such as Sir Thomas Reeve) are the subject of memorials only, with the burials having taken place elsewhere.

- Alexander Baker, MP for Windsor, 1660.
- James Thomas Bedborough, Mayor of Windsor, 1846 and 1853.
- William Canon, Mayor of Windsor, 1489.
- John Clode, Mayor of Windsor, 1825–26 and 1830–31.
- Matthew Day, Mayor of Windsor, 1610, 1618, 1621, 1630, 1642.
- Idonea De Audele, Abbess of Burnham Abbey, 1314–24.
- James Eglestone, Mayor of Windsor 1797, 1807, and 1821.
- James Ellison, surgeon to the household of Queen Victoria.
- Humphrey Fawcett, Mayor of Windsor, 1602, 1607, 1615.
- Topham Foot, unsuccessful Whig candidate in the 1712 by-election for Windsor; his monument in the church is an early work by the Flemish sculptor Peter Scheemakers.
- Richard Gallys, MP for Windsor, 1563–67 and 1572–74; Mayor of Windsor, 1561, 1566, 1570: the church has his hatchment.
- William Heberden, physician.
- William Heberden the Younger, physician to George III and Queen Charlotte.
- Thomas Jenner, Mayor of Windsor, 1827.
- John Kirkpatrick, commander of the East India Company ship the Henry Addington, including during the Battle of Pulo Aura in the South China Sea in 1804.
- Sir George Henry Long, Mayor of Windsor, 1896.
- Sir Thomas Reeve, Chief Justice of the Common Pleas, 1736–37; the memorial is a work by the Flemish sculptor Peter Scheemakers.
- Richard Washington, Mayor of Windsor, 1596, 1600, 1606 and 1613.
