= Edward Baker =

Edward or Ted Baker may refer to:

== Sportspeople ==
- Edward Baker (cricketer, born 1892) (1892–1969), English cricketer
- Edward Baker (Kent cricketer) (1846–1913), English cricketer
- Edward Baker (Worcestershire cricketer) (1910–1992), English cricketer
- Edward Baker (South African cricketer) (1930–1993), South African cricketer
- Ed Baker (quarterback) (born 1948), American football player
- Ed Baker (American football coach) (1931–2013), American football player and coach
- Ted Baker (footballer) (1901–1986), Aussie rules footballer
- Edward Baker (American football) (c. 1909–1959), American football player and coach
- Edward Baker (rugby union)

== Politicians ==
- Edward D. Baker (1811–1861), American senator and Union soldier
- Edward Baker (British politician) (c. 1775–1862), British Conservative Member of Parliament
- Edward Baker Lincoln (1846–1850), son of Abraham Lincoln, named after Edward Dickinson Baker

== Others ==
- Ed Baker (entomologist) (born c. 1985), British entomologist and bioacoustician
- Edward J. Baker (1868–1959), American philanthropist from St. Charles, Illinois
- E. C. Stuart Baker (1864–1944), British ornithologist and police officer
- Edward L. Baker Jr. (1865–1913), American soldier and Medal of Honor recipient
- Edward M. Baker (1875–1957), American investment broker
- Eddie Baker (1897–1968), American actor
- Ted Baker (chemist) (born 1942), New Zealand scientist
- Ted Baker (publican) (1872–1936), South Australian sportsman
- Edward Norman Baker (1857–1913), British colonial officer; Lieutenant Governor of Bengal

== See also ==
- Edward Baker-Duly (born 1977), South African actor
- Edward Baker House, historic Queen Anne house in the city of Streator, Illinois, also known as Silas Williams House
- Ted Baker, British retail company
- Edmund Baker (1854–1911), American politician and businessman
- Edwin Baker (disambiguation)
