= Windsor School =

Windsor School may refer to:

- Windsor School, Chile
- Windsor School, Germany
- Windsor School, Winnipeg

== See also ==
- The Windsor Boys' School
- Windsor Girls' School
