= Thomas Weldon (politician) =

English politician and courtier

Thomas Weldon (c. 1500 – 1567) of Cookham, Berkshire, was an English Member of Parliament and member of the Royal household during the Tudor period.

Thomas was the son of Hugh Weldon, Sewer to King Henry VIII. He lived at Cannon Court at Cookham in Berkshire. He married twice and had seven children. He was the uncle of Edward Weldon, MP. Thomas was the Member of Parliament for Berkshire in 1542–1544, and also for Windsor in 1559. He was also the Cofferer of the Royal Household for Edward VI and Elizabeth I. He was a patron of one of the Protestant Windsor Martyrs, Anthony Pearson, for which he spent some time in the Fleet Prison.
