= Windsor, Berkshire =

Town in Berkshire, England

Coordinates: 51°28′45″N 0°36′34″W

Windsor
- Town
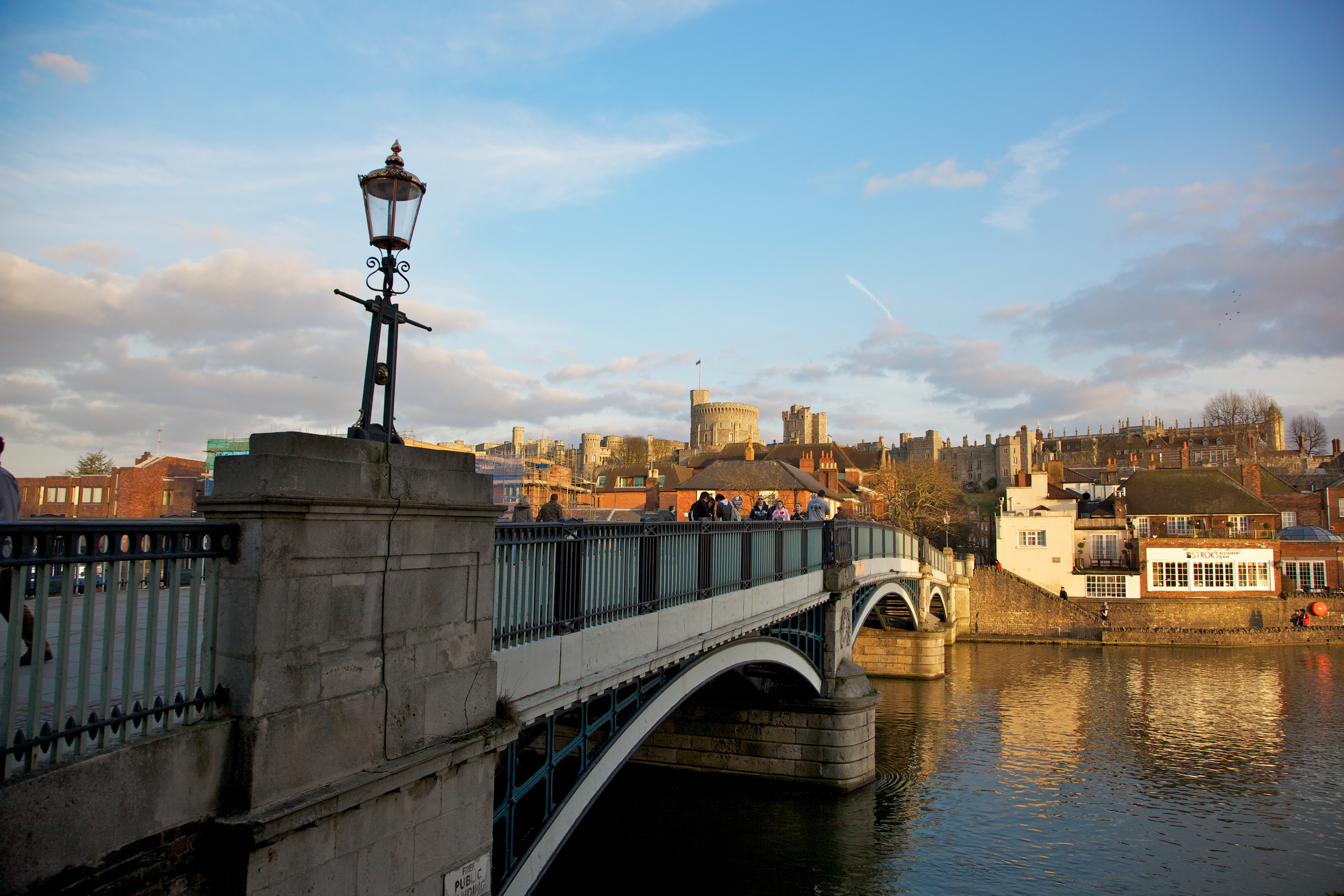
- Windsor Bridge, Windsor and Windsor Castle

- Location within Berkshire
- Area: 5.2 sq mi (13 km^{2})
- Population: 31,560 (Built-up area, 2021)
  - Density: 6,069/sq mi (2,343/km^{2})
- OS grid reference: SU965765
- Unitary authority: Windsor and Maidenhead
- Ceremonial county: Berkshire
- Region: South East
- Country: England
- Sovereign state: United Kingdom
- Post town: Windsor
- Postcode district: SL4
- Dialling code: 01753
- Police: Thames Valley
- Fire: Royal Berkshire
- Ambulance: South Central
- UK Parliament: Windsor

Windsor is a historic town in the Royal Borough of Windsor and Maidenhead in Berkshire, England. It is home to Windsor Castle, one of the official residences of the British monarch. The town is located 21.8 miles (35.1 km) west of Charing Cross in central London, 5.8 miles (9.3 km) southeast of Maidenhead, and 15.8 miles (25.4 km) east of the modern county town of Reading. It lies immediately south of the River Thames, which forms its boundary with the smaller and historic town of Eton. The village of Old Windsor, just over 2 miles (3 km) to the south, predates what is now called Windsor by, possibly, 300 years. Until 1974, Windsor was sometimes officially referred to as New Windsor to distinguish the two.

== Etymology ==
Windlesora is first mentioned in the Anglo-Saxon Chronicle. (The settlement had an earlier name, but this is unknown.) The name has no exact etymology, but the closest estimation is that it derives from Old English Windles-ore or winch by the riverside. This etymology is shared with Winsor in Hampshire and also Broadwindsor (Dorset), but topographically all three are different. By 1110, Henry of Huntingdon's chronicle, Historia Anglorum, notes that meetings of the Great Council, which had previously taken place at Windlesora, were taking place at the castle, referred to as New Windsor. By the late 12th century the settlement at Windelsora had been renamed Old Windsor.

== History ==
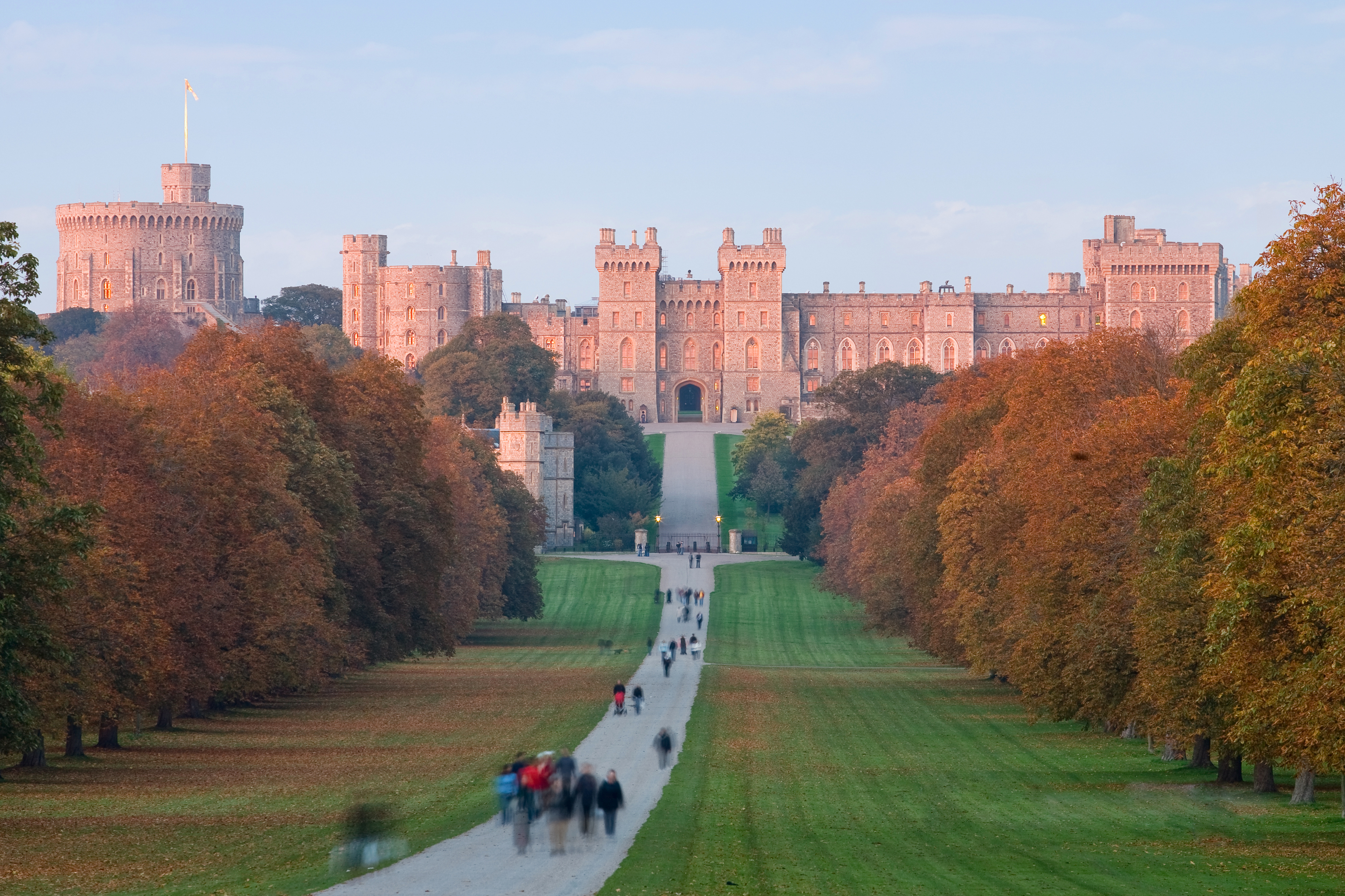
Windsor Castle, viewed from the Long Walk

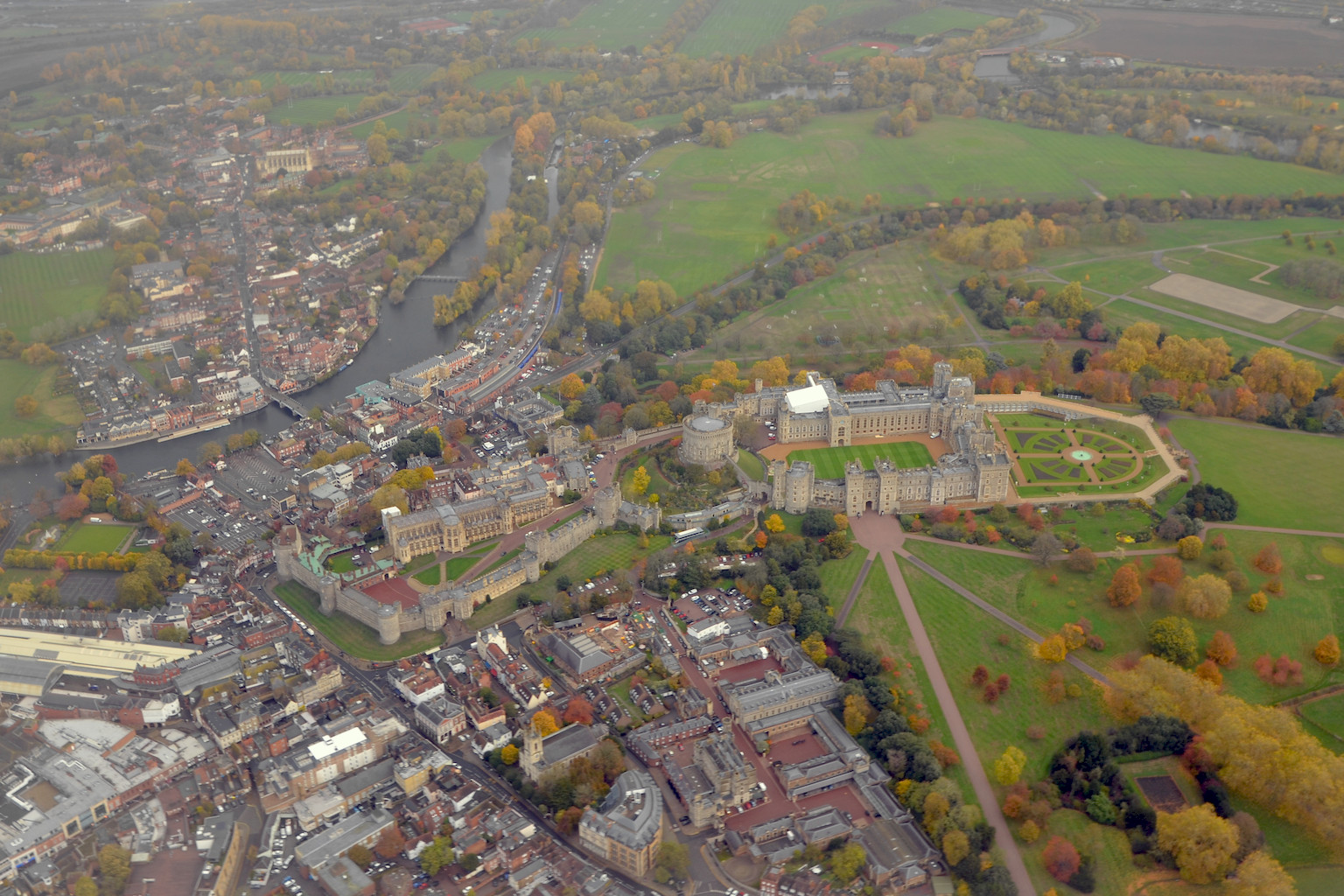
Aerial view of Windsor around its castle and Eton in the distance, with Home Park in the bottom right

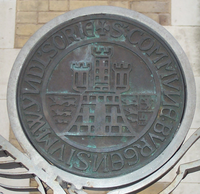
Windsor Seal

=== Medieval period ===
The early history of the site is unknown, although Old English field names in its vicinity that survived to be documented in the medieval period, confirm that a substantial community existed on this site for a considerable time before 1066. By 1070, recognising the strategic importance of the site, William the Conqueror had a timber motte-and-bailey castle constructed. There had been a small riverside settlement about 3 miles (5 km) downstream, possibly established in the late 7th century. From about the 8th century, high status people visited the site, although by the 9th, according to the archaeological record, it had been abandoned. From the mid-11th century the site came back into use, and it is occasionally mentioned in the sources, linked with King Edward the Confessor and his love of sports hunting. After the Conquest, royal use of the site increased, probably because it demonstrated royal continuity, and also provided access to woodlands for hunting, as the use of a short bow on horseback was a valuable military skill.

=== 12th and 13th centuries ===
The settlement at Old Windsor largely transferred to New Windsor during the 12th century, which required the substantial planning and setting out of the new town, including its parish church, marketplace, and burgage plots. There was a second development phase after the Anarchy, the civil war of King Stephen's reign, when its hospital (c. 1160, later dedicated to St Peter), a hermitage (c. 1160, dedicated to St Leonard) and Thames bridge (c. 1173), came into existence. At about the same time, the castle was rebuilt in stone. Windsor Bridge is the earliest bridge on the Thames between Staines and Reading, built (and owned by the Crown) at a time when bridge building was rare; it was first documented in 1191 but had probably been built, according to the Pipe rolls, in 1173. It played an important part in the national road system, before the construction of the Great West Road in c. 1230, linking London with Reading and Winchester. By directing traffic into the new town, it underpinned the success of New Windsor's fledgling economy.

The town of New Windsor, as an ancient demesne of the Crown, was a privileged settlement from the start, apparently having the rights of a free borough, for which other towns had to pay substantial fees to the king. It had a merchant guild, a part of civic government, in 1260, this body sometimes incorrectly confused with the 14th century religious Fraternity of the Holy Trinity, based in the parish church. After receiving its first charter confirming its royal borough status in 1277, Windsor was briefly named as the chief town of the county. Somewhat unusually, however, this charter gave no new rights or privileges, seeming simply to codify rights enjoyed over many years before.

=== 14th century ===
Windsor's position as chief town of Berkshire was short-lived, however, as people found it difficult to reach. Wallingford took over this position in the early 14th century. As a self-governing town Windsor enjoyed a number of freedoms unavailable to other towns, including the right to convene a court of record, the right to inherit land (burgage plots), and the right to elect its corporation. The town accounts of the 16th century survive in part, although most of the once substantial borough archive, dating back to the late 12th century, was destroyed, probably in the late 17th century.

New Windsor was a nationally significant town in the Middle Ages, certainly one of the fifty wealthiest towns in the country by 1332. Its prosperity came from its close association with the royal household. The repeated investment in the castle brought London merchants (goldsmiths, vintners, spicers and mercers) to the town in the late 13th century and provided much employment for townsmen. The development of the castle under Edward III, between 1350 and 1368, was the largest secular building project in England of the Middle Ages, and many Windsor people worked on this project, again bringing great wealth to the town. Although the Black Death in 1348 had reduced some towns' populations by up to 50%, in Windsor the building projects of Edward III brought money to the town, and possibly its population doubled: this was a 'boom' time for the local economy. People came to the town from every part of the country, and from continental Europe. The poet Geoffrey Chaucer held the honorific post of Clerk of the Works at Windsor Castle in 1391, although there is no record that he ever visited the town.

=== 15th century ===
The development of the castle continued in the late 15th century with the rebuilding of St George's Chapel as a royal mausoleum, as Westminster Abbey was considered full and unable to accommodate further royal burials. With this Windsor became a major pilgrimage destination, particularly for Londoners. Pilgrims came to touch the royal shrine of the murdered Henry VI, the fragment of the True Cross and other important relics. Visits to the chapel were probably combined with a visit to the important nearby Marian shrine and college at Eton, founded by Henry VI in 1440, and dedicated to the Assumption; which is now Eton College. Pilgrims came with substantial sums to spend, providing a substantial boost to the town's economy. From perhaps two or three named inns in the late 15th century, some 30 can be identified a century later. The town again grew in wealth. For London pilgrims, Windsor was probably – but briefly – of greater importance than Canterbury and the shrine of that city's patron saint Thomas Becket.

=== Tudor and Stuart periods ===
With the closures of the Reformation, however, Windsor's pilgrim traffic gradually died out, and the town began to stagnate. The castle was considered by royalty to be militaristic and old-fashioned, compared with 'modern' Hampton Court. The early modern period formed a stark contrast to the medieval history of the town. Henry VIII was buried in St George's Chapel in 1547, next to Jane Seymour, the mother of his only legitimate son, Edward (Edward VI). Henry, the founder of the Church of England, may have wanted to benefit from the stream of pilgrims coming to the town. His will gives that impression.

Most accounts of Windsor in the 16th and 17th centuries talk of its poverty, badly made streets and poor housing. Shakespeare's play The Merry Wives of Windsor is set in Windsor and contains many references to parts of the town and the surrounding countryside. Since there is no record that Shakespeare ever visited Windsor, and because some of the references in his play are topographically inaccurate, he must have taken his local place-names from a third-party source, perhaps a crude map of the town. The play references the Garter inn, a place that actually existed, but was destroyed in the Great Fire of Windsor in 1681. The long-standing – and famous – courtesan of king Charles II, Nell Gwyn, was given a house on St Albans Street: Burford House (now part of the Royal Mews). Her residence in this house, as far as it is possible to tell, was brief. Only one of her letters addressed from Burford House survives. The house was probably intended as a legacy for her illegitimate son, the Earl of Burford, later the Duke of St Albans.

Windsor was garrisoned by Colonel Venn during the English Civil War. Later it became the home of the New Model Army when Venn had left the castle in 1645. Despite its royal dependence, like many commercial centres, Windsor was a Parliamentarian town. Charles I was buried without ceremony in St George's Chapel after his execution at Whitehall in 1649. The present town hall, colloquially but inaccurately called Guildhall, was built in 1680–91. It replaced the function of a timber -framed market house built on the same site in 1597–99, together with that of Windsor's first, and much larger, guildhall, which faced the castle and had been built around 1350. At this time, the town was extremely poor, and could only just raise the sums required for the new building, part of a much larger scheme, subsequently abandoned, to modernise the medieval town centre, matching the revamping of the castle under Charles II, to a design by Hugh May.

But his successors did not use the place, preferring up-to-date Hampton Court. Windsor Castle again fell into disrepair, together with its client town. Its population dipped, probably below 1,500 inhabitants, and although some of its buildings were given new, fashionable front elevations, its housing stock was much decayed and insanitary. The town continued in poverty until the mid-19th century. In 1652 the largest house in Windsor Great Park was built on land which Oliver Cromwell had appropriated from the Crown. Now known as Cumberland Lodge after the Duke of Cumberland's residence there in the mid-18th century, the house was variously known as Byfield House, New Lodge, Ranger's Lodge, Windsor Lodge and Great Lodge.

=== Georgian and Victorian periods ===
In 1778, royal visits to Windsor resumed, although not to the castle as this was in a state of decay. Rather, George III extended a summer house first built by Queen Anne, which faced the upper ward walls, and was known as the Garden House. The extended building was renamed Upper lodge, but owing to George III's ill health, part of the royal apartments in the castle were refurbished in 1804 for his use. This started a period of new development in Windsor, with the building of two army barracks. However the associated large numbers of soldiers led to a major prostitution problem by 1830, in a town where the number of streets had little changed since 1400. In the 18th century the town traded with London, selling Windsor Chairs which were actually made in Buckinghamshire.

A number of fine houses were built in this period, including Hadleigh House on Sheet Street, which was built in 1793 by the then mayor of Windsor, William Thomas. In 1811 it was the home of John O'Reilly, the apothecary-surgeon to George III. Windsor Castle was the westernmost sighting-point for the Anglo-French Survey (1784–1790), which measured the precise distance between the Royal Greenwich Observatory and the Paris Observatory by trigonometry. Windsor was used because of its relative proximity to the base-line of the survey at Hounslow Heath.

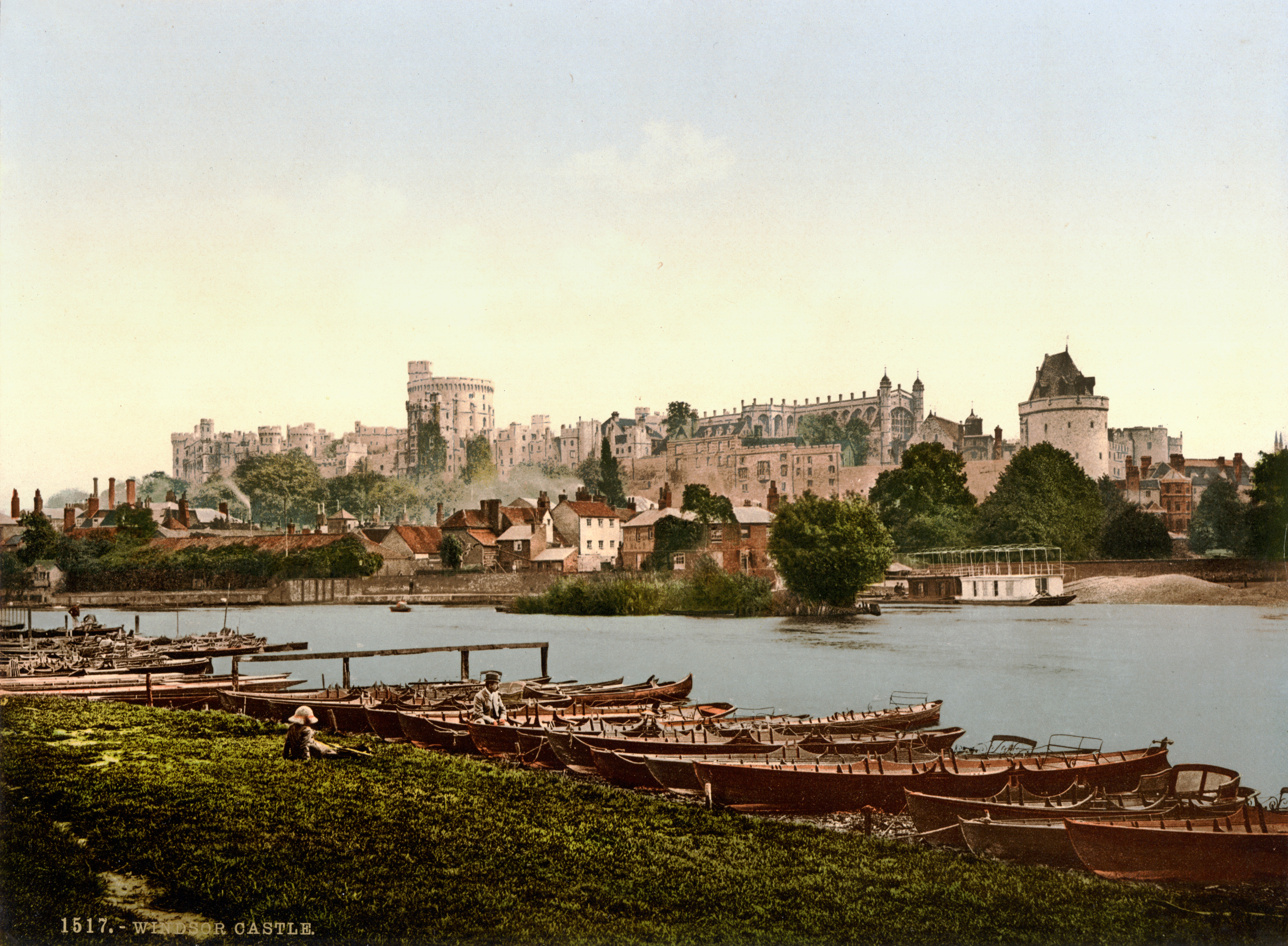
Photochrom of Windsor and Windsor Castle looking across the Thames, 1895

The substantial redevelopment of the castle in the subsequent decade and Queen Victoria's residence from 1840, as well as the coming of two railways in 1849, signalled the most dramatic changes in the town's history. These events catapulted the town from a sleepy medieval has-been to the centre of empire – many European crowned heads of state came to Windsor to visit the Queen throughout the rest of the 19th century. Unfortunately, excessive redevelopment and 'refurbishment' of Windsor's medieval fabric at this time resulted in widespread destruction of the old town, including the demolition of the old parish church of St John the Baptist in 1820. The original had been built in stages from about 1135, with significant enhancement work in the 14th century, including the construction of a spire and the addition of two chapels in the 15th: one built by the fraternity of the Holy Trinity, and a second by the town corporation, and dedicated to the Virgin.

=== A surviving ancient remnant: Peascod Street ===
Most of the town's current streets date from the mid to late 19th century. However the main street, Peascod Street ( /ˈpɛskɒd/), now a shopping street leading up to the castle, is probably very ancient, and certainly existed in the period of Anglo-Saxon rule. It was used to set out the parish boundary of Windsor manor in the 10th century, and had acquired its name, as part of the new town, by 1190. This name, the earliest documented street name in Windsor, is curious. Originally, Peascroft-strat, apparently a croft (or toft) of land belonging to an individual called Pea, modified in the 13th century to Peascod, seemingly referring to a popular medieval snack, a pea pod fried in butter. Possibly this snack was a speciality of the area. Alternatively, and like all early Windsor street names, Peas-croft may refer to the land it crossed, which would support its link to a family known for growing peas, or to a plot used for this purpose.

== Religion ==
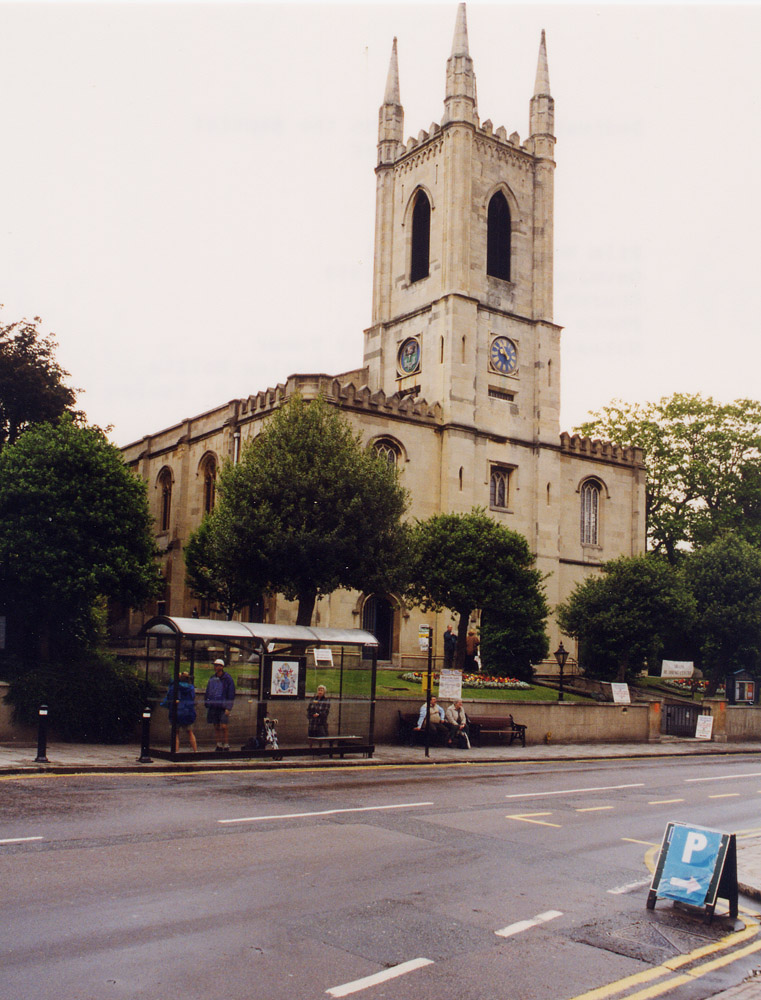
St John the Baptist's parish church

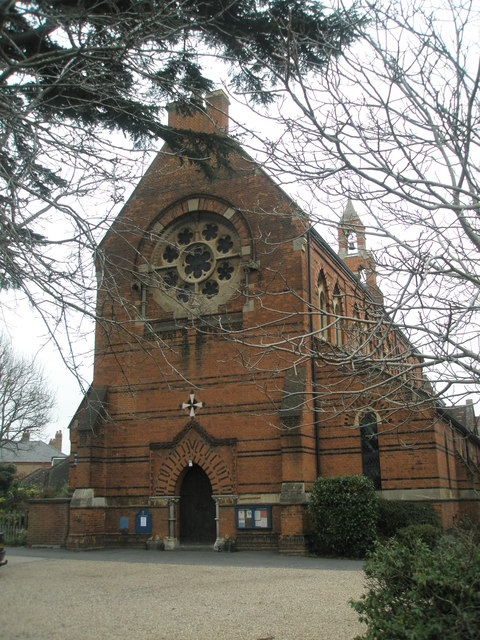
All Saints' parish church

The original parish church of Windsor is dedicated to St John the Baptist and is situated adjacent to the High Street. The church is said to have dated from the time that King Henry I moved the Royal Court from Old Windsor to 'New Windsor'. The church was clearly established by the time of Henry II in about 1270, as there are references to it by then. Henry II granted its advowson to the priory of Waltham Holy Cross in atonement for the death of Thomas Becket in 1170, and it remained in the priory's possession until 1528, when its responsibility transferred to Windsor Corporation, explaining the date of its earliest Wardens' Accounts, which are still extant. In 1543, Henry Filmer, Robert Testwood and Anthony Pearson, the three Windsor Martyrs, were burnt at the stake as part of a conspiracy known as the Prebendaries' Plot, to unseat the Archbishop of Canterbury, Thomas Cranmer. The plot failed, but not before the three Windsor men were put to death, in a field adjoining the river Thames, not far from the present-day site of the Riverside railway station on Datchet Road, owned by the local ring-leader of the conspiracy, William Symonds. The original church building had Saxon arches and Norman work. Pre-Reformation it counted at least eleven saintly altars, many with two keepers, two principal chapels and a rood loft. In the 15th century, lodgings were built against its north elevation for the Trinity fraternity's morrow mass priest. By the 18th century it was described as 'a vast building with 10 side altars and several chantries' (i.e. chantry chapels) and perhaps eight gabled roofs. A lightening strike in the 16th century destroyed its spire, and owing to a shortage of funds, this was replaced with a truncated lantern-type arrangement.

In 1818 the high cost of repairs to the old building led to plans for a complete rebuild at a cost of £14,000. Charles Hollis was appointed architect and the new building was erected between 1820 and 1822 with cast iron columns that were floated down the Thames. The ribs that support the roof are also cast iron. The new church, Gothic in style with a pinnacle tower containing the bells, was consecrated by the Bishop of Salisbury on 22 June 1822. Samuel Sanders Teulon added the chancel and the apse in 1880. The chancel screen was added in 1898 to mark the 60-year reign of Queen Victoria. In 1906 the Hunter organ was installed. The north side gallery was reduced in length to make way for the organ.

The more recent church of All Saints' is situated on Frances Road. The incumbent vicar is the Revd Canon Sally Lodge. The author Thomas Hardy trained as an architect and joined Arthur Blomfield's practice as assistant architect in April 1862. Between 1862 and 1864 he worked with Blomfield on All Saints'. A reredos, possibly designed by Hardy, was discovered behind panelling at All Saints' in August 2016.

== Tourism ==
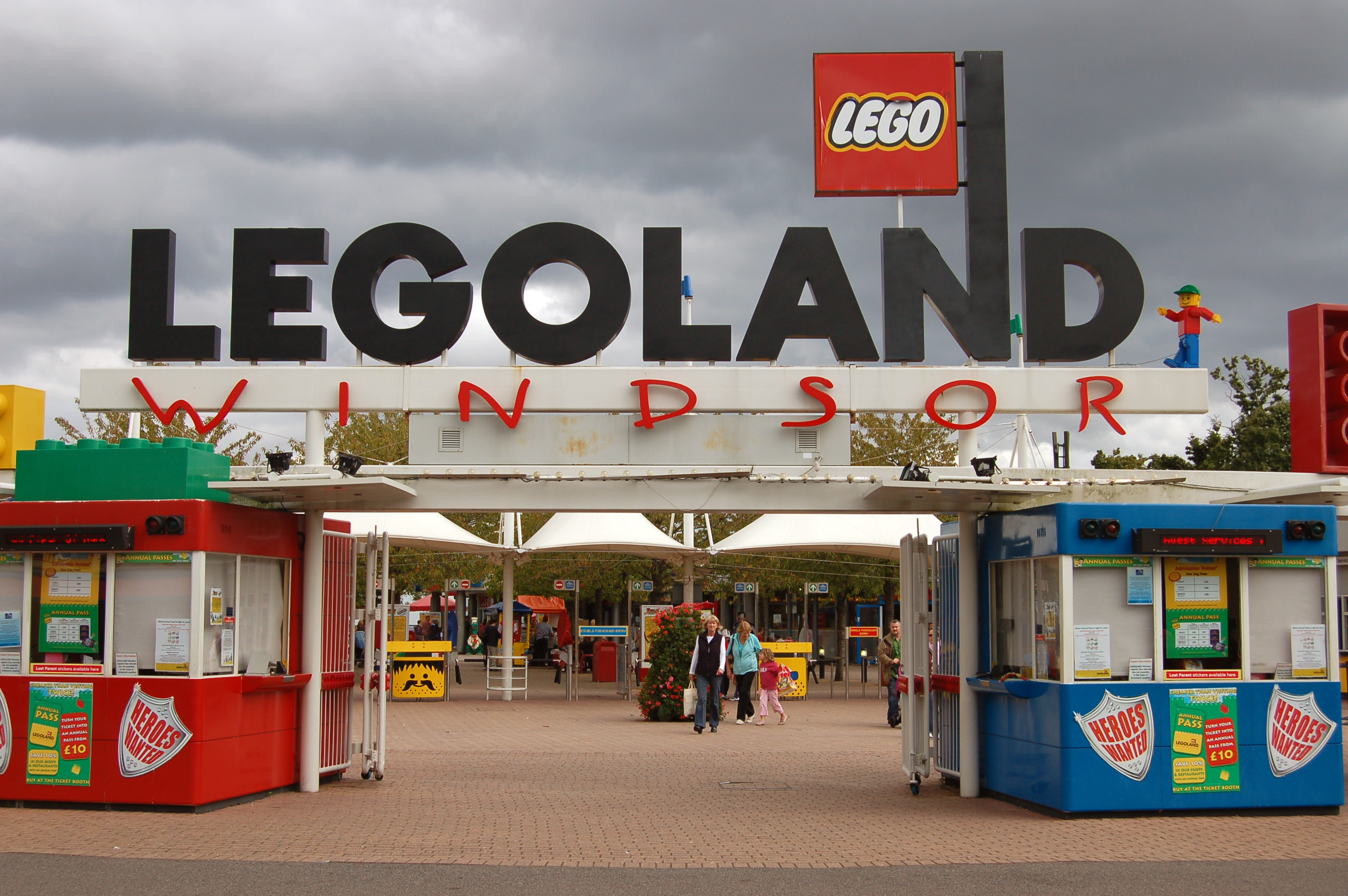
Entrance to Legoland Windsor Resort

Mainly because of the castle, Windsor is a popular tourist destination. It has a theatre and several substantial hotels. Various boat trips operate on the River Thames, with connections to Maidenhead and Staines-upon-Thames. In winter, Alexandra Gardens hosts a temporary ice rink. Near the town is Legoland Windsor Resort, the only Legoland park in the United Kingdom and the largest Legoland park in the world in terms of area. Legoland Windsor was built on the site of the former Windsor Safari Park.

== Shopping ==
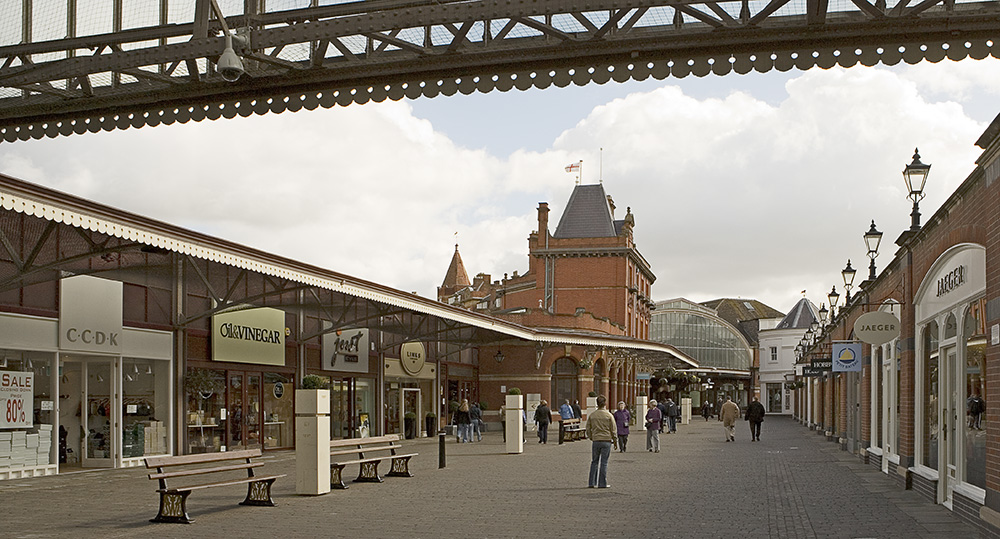
Central Station refashioned as a shopping precinct

As a tourist town there are many gift shops around the castle, and there are shops and restaurants in Windsor Royal Station inside Windsor & Eton Central railway station. The main shopping street is Peascod Street.

== Transport ==
Windsor & Eton Riverside railway station

Windsor has two railway stations.

- Windsor & Eton Central railway station is the southern terminus of the branch line from Slough. A Great Western Railway shuttle to Slough connects with services to London Paddington and Reading.
- Windsor & Eton Riverside station is the terminus for South Western Railway, with direct services from London Waterloo.

Both stations were built at around the same time in the 19th century, as the two train companies which owned the lines both wanted to carry Queen Victoria to Windsor, with the first line opened gaining the privilege. From 1883 to 1885, London's District Railway's westbound service from ran as far as Windsor.

Bus services in the town are provided by Thames Valley Buses, First Berkshire & The Thames Valley and Reading Buses. There are frequent bus services between Windsor and Heathrow Airport, Green Line Coach Station in Central London, and Legoland Windsor Resort. Windsor has a large central coach park with 74 spaces to cater mostly for the large tourist groups coming to visit Windsor Castle and town. It is accessed by pedestrians via a footbridge adjacent to Windsor & Eton Central railway station.

Windsor is linked to the town of Eton (on the opposite bank of the River Thames) by Windsor Bridge. This bridge closed to motor traffic in 1970, and is now for pedestrians and cyclists only.

Windsor lies on National Cycle Route 4 (London–Fishguard). The main access roads serving the town have adjacent cycle paths or nearby alternative traffic-free cycle routes.

Windsor has links to three motorways:

- the M3 (junction 3), 10 miles (16 km) to the south via the A332, passing Ascot;
- the M4 (junction 6), 3 miles (5 km) to the north via the A332, with the A355 spur leading to Slough;
- the M25 (junction 13), 5 miles (8 km) to the east via the A308, which continues to Staines-upon-Thames.

== Sport ==
Windsor's senior football team is Windsor & Eton F.C. The team currently play in the Isthmian League South Central Division and their home ground is Stag Meadow, granted to the original club by King George V in 1911.

Windsor Cricket Club's clubhouse and pitches are at Home Park (public) adjacent to Windsor Castle. The club played host to a 2006 Lord's Taverners cricket match. The Windsor 1st team currently play in Division 2A of the Thames Valley League.

Windsor Rugby Club also use the Home Park (public) ground and the team currently plays in the Southern Counties North division.

Several other local sports clubs are based at Home Park (public), including hockey and archery clubs, and the Datchet Dashers running club.

Royal Windsor Rollergirls were one of the first roller derby leagues to be founded in the UK in 2007. They disbanded in 2023.

== Education ==
=== State schools ===
State-funded schooling in the town is provided by a system of three-tier schooling. Schools are controlled by either the local authority or academy trusts. The town is served by eleven first schools for children up to 9 years old, and three middle schools until age 13.

Pupils aged 13–18 can elect to attend the town's two single-sex secondary schools: The Windsor Boys' School and Windsor Girls' School.

=== Independent schools ===
Several independent schools operate in the town, including:

- St George's School, Windsor Castle

=== Local media ===
Local radio stations are community based radio stations such as Radio Roadhouse and Royal Borough Radio.

The town's local newspaper is the Windsor Express.

== Governance ==
There is one tier of local government covering Windsor, at unitary authority level: the Royal Borough of Windsor and Maidenhead, which has its headquarters in Maidenhead. The Windsor built-up area is unparished. As at November 2023, the possibility of creating a civil parish covering the town was being considered by the borough council, but no decision had been made.

In 2012 the council reintroduced the role of town crier to the borough. The previous town crier had retired in 1892 and for 120 years the post remained vacant. The current crier is Chris Brown.

In 2018 the belongings of homeless people were controversially removed and stored for reasons of security. A bus intended to shelter the Windsor homeless was impounded by police.

=== Constituency ===
The current Member of Parliament for the Windsor constituency (which includes the surrounding small towns and villages, such as Eton and Datchet) is Jack Rankin (Conservative), who was first elected at the 2024 General Election.

=== Administrative history ===
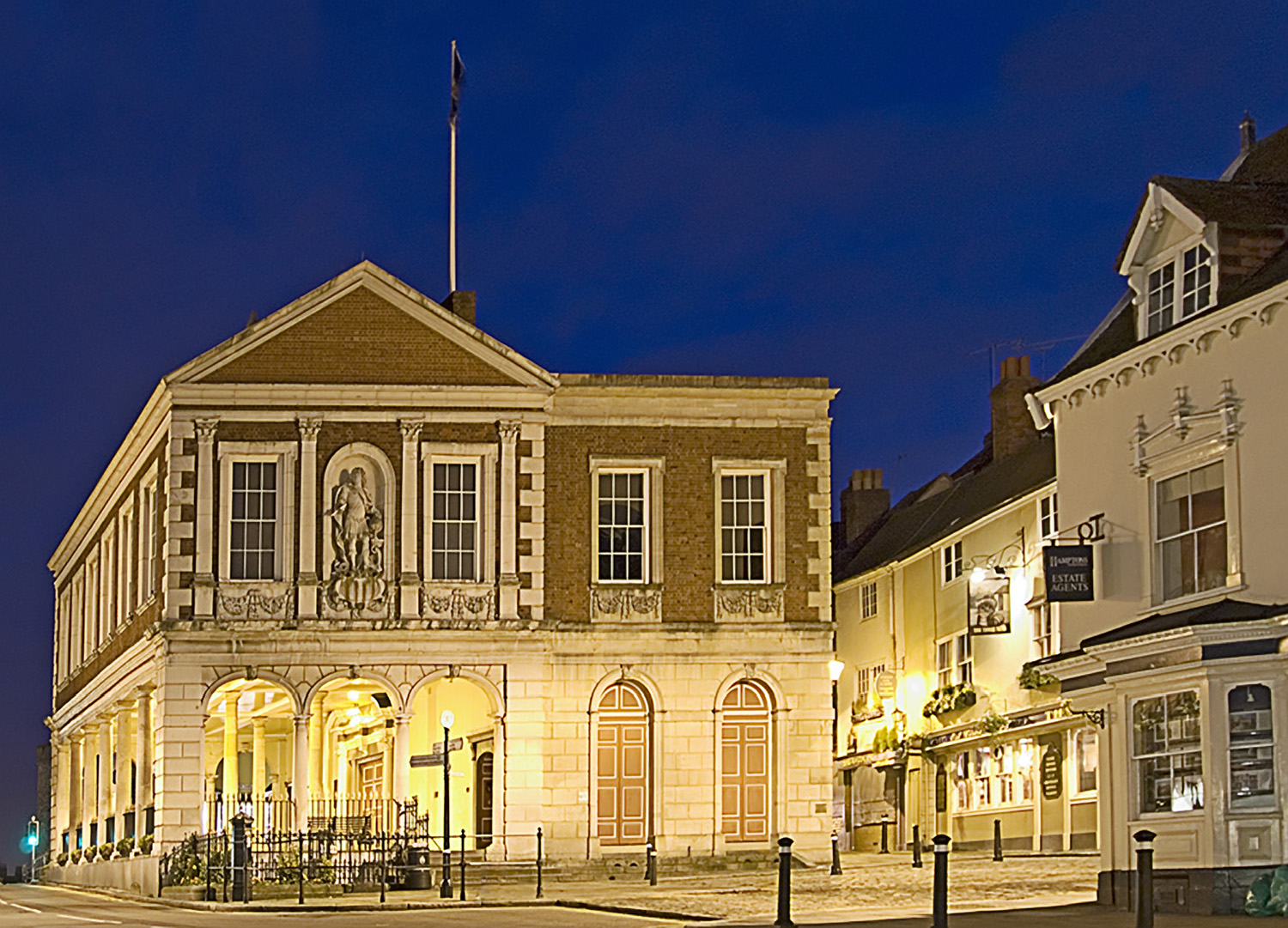
The Market Place and Windsor Guildhall

Windsor was an ancient borough, officially called 'New Windsor' to distinguish it from the neighbouring village and parish of Old Windsor. New Windsor's earliest known charter was issued in 1277, but the evidence suggests the town was administered as a borough prior to that. The borough covered the parish of New Windsor and part of the parish of Clewer. It was reformed to become a municipal borough in 1836 under the Municipal Corporations Act 1835, which standardised how most boroughs operated across the country.

The Local Government Act 1894 directed that parishes were no longer allowed to straddle borough boundaries, and so the parish of Clewer was split into parishes called Clewer Within, being within the borough boundaries, and Clewer Without, covering the area outside the borough. Clewer Without was subsequently absorbed into the borough of New Windsor in 1920, after which the borough contained the three parishes of New Windsor, Clewer Within and Clewer Without. The borough council met at Windsor Guildhall.

The borough was styled a royal borough from medieval times. Following a proliferation of other boroughs with royal connections styling themselves as royal boroughs in the early 20th century, the government announced in 1926 that only Windsor and Kensington had official sanction to use the title.

The municipal borough of New Windsor was abolished in 1974 under the Local Government Act 1972, becoming part of the borough of Windsor and Maidenhead, which was allowed to use the style of royal borough. The Royal Borough of Windsor and Maidenhead became a unitary authority in 1998 when it took over the functions of the abolished Berkshire County Council.

== Twin towns ==
Windsor is twinned with:

- Goslar, Lower Saxony, Germany (since 1969)
- Neuilly-sur-Seine, Hauts-de-Seine, France (since 1955)

== Notable residents ==
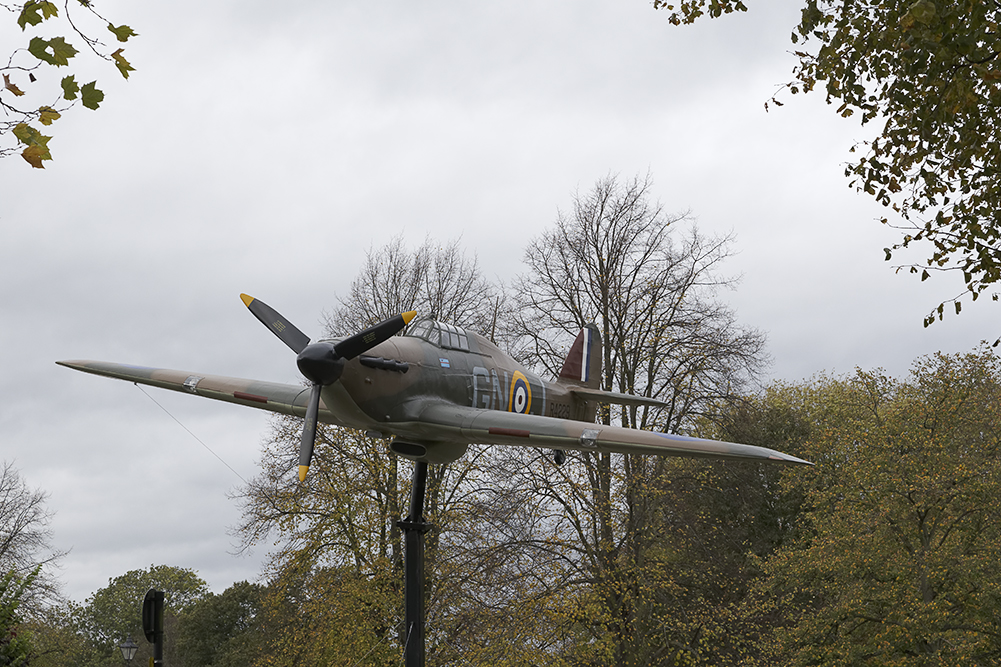
Sir Sydney Camm memorial, near Alexandra Gardens

Windsor has had many notable residents.

- King Charles III and other British royal family members
- Bruce Anstey, New Zealand motorcycle racer; previously lived in Windsor
- Sir Dhunjibhoy Bomanji, shipping magnate, socialite and philanthropist lived in Windsor
- Zinzan Brooke, New Zealand rugby union international; formerly played amateur rugby for Windsor Rugby Football Club
- Sir Michael Caine, actor; lived at the Old Mill House, Clewer
- Sir Sydney Camm, designer of the World War II fighter aircraft the Hawker Hurricane, lived at 10 Alma Road; a memorial in the form of a replica Hawker Hurricane is displayed near Alexandra Gardens, on the Thames Promenade
- Billy Connolly, comedian; lived in Windsor for several years in the 1990s
- Elizabeth Counsell, actress; born in Windsor
- Richard Fairbrass and Fred Fairbrass, singers from Right said Fred live in Windsor
- Ranulph Fiennes, adventurer, explorer and author; born in Windsor
- Dhani Harrison, musician and son of George Harrison; born in Windsor
- James Haskell, former England Rugby Union player; born in Windsor
- Chesney Hawkes, musician and son of Chip Hawkes; born in Windsor
- Natalie Imbruglia, Australian pop singer; owns a house in the Clewer village area of Windsor
- Norman Lovett, stand-up comedian and actor best known, as an actor, for playing Holly, the ship's computer, in the TV series Red Dwarf; born in Windsor
- Hubert Stanley Middleton, organist and Cambridge University don; born in Windsor
- Caroline Munro, actress and model, born in Windsor, 1949
- Margaret Oliphant, 19th century novelist and historical writer; lived at Clarence Crescent
- Peter Osgood, Chelsea and England footballer; born and resided for many years in Windsor
- Jeremy Kyle, television presenter, lives in Windsor
- Jimmy Page, musician, lived at the Old Mill House at the end of Mill Lane, Windsor 1980-2004
- Billy Smart Jr., circus co-owner; lived in St. Leonard's mansion in the heart of Windsor Safari Park, where he entertained celebrated persons from Princess Margaret to the Beatles; he sold his St. Leonard's Hill guest house to comedian Freddie Starr; and later lived in Ascot Place, which is now apartments and has a plaque and statue dedicated to him
- Elizabeth Spencer, Duchess of Marlborough
- Jim Swire, doctor best known for his involvement in the aftermath of the 1988 bombing of Pan Am Flight 103
- Hugh Thomas, historian; born in Windsor
- H. G. Wells, author; lived and worked in Windsor in 1880
