= Robert Benet =

British politician

Robert Benet was the Mayor of Windsor, England in 1536.

Benet was a zealous Protestant who fell foul of William Simonds, an equally zealous Catholic in Windsor, who had a powerful friend in Bishop Gardiner's agent, Dr John London. Benet was arrested in 1543, along with four others. He was condemned to death but, unlike the three Windsor Martyrs, escaped being burnt because he was unwell! He was later released.
