= Cofferer of the Household =

Former office in the English and British Royal Household

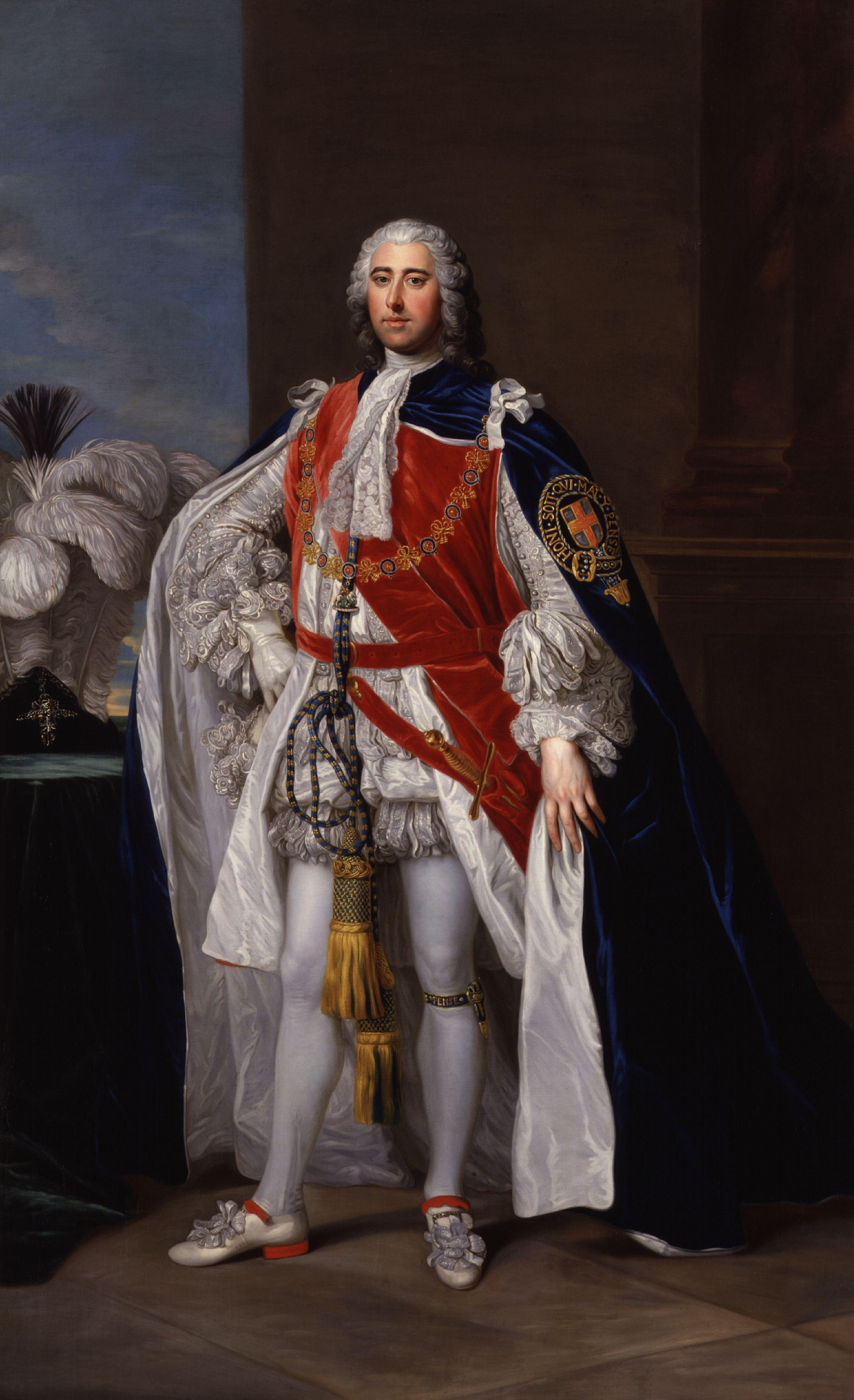
Henry Pelham-Clinton, 2nd Duke of Newcastle served Cofferer of the Household between 1747 and 1754.

The cofferer of the Household was formerly an office in the English and British Royal Household. Next in rank to the Comptroller, the holder paid the wages of some of the servants above and below stairs, was a member of the Board of Green Cloth, and sat with the Lord Steward in the Court of the Verge. The cofferer was usually of political rank and always a member of the Privy Council.

The office dates from the 13th century, when it was known as Cofferer of the Wardrobe. The Keeper of the Wardrobe was at this time increasingly occupied with matters of state, and so his chief clerk gradually took on additional responsibilities for accounting and bookkeeping, and came to be referred to as the Cofferer. As such, he became in effect the working head of the Wardrobe, and acted when required as locum tenens to the Keeper. The Cofferer had his own staff of clerks, who later came to be known as the Clerks of the Green Cloth (after the green cloth covering of the table in the accounting office).

By the end of the 14th century the Wardrobe had ceased to be an independent office of influence at Court; its officers were made subsidiary to the Lord Steward and duly re-designated as being 'of the Household' (rather than 'of the Wardrobe'). The Cofferer retained his role as principal accounting officer under the Lord Steward.

The office of Cofferer was abolished by the Civil List and Secret Service Money Act 1782. By the same means 'provision was made for more economical methods of keeping the accounts of Civil List expenditure under the Lords Commissioners of the Treasury': thenceforward the accounts of the Lord Steward's Department were included in the Estimates.

== List of incumbents ==
Name	Entered office	Left office	Notes	Reference
Roger Repington			In office during the reign of Empress Matilda in the 12th century	
William Louth	1274	1280		
William March	1280	1284		
Henry Wheatley	1284	1287		
Walter Langton	1287	1290	Keeper of the Wardrobe, 1290	
John Droxford	1290	1290	Keeper of the Wardrobe, 1295	
Philip Everdon	1290	1295		
Walter Barton	1295	1297		
Ralph Manton	1297	1303		
Walter Bedwyn	1303	1307		
Peter Collingbourn	1307	1308	Keeper of the Wardrobe, 1312	
John Ockham	1308	1309		
Robert Wodehouse	1309	1311	Controller of the Wardrobe, 1314	
John Ockham	1311	1314		
Nicholas Huggate	1314	1315	Controller of the Wardrobe, 1326	
Henry Hale	1316	1316		
Robert Wodehouse	1317	1318		
Unknown	(1318–1320)			
Richard Ferriby	1320	1323	Controller of the Wardrobe, 1331	
Unknown	(1323–1327)			
Richard Bury	1327	1328	Keeper of the Wardrobe, 1328	
John Houton	1328	1331		
William Norwell	1331	1334	Keeper of the Wardrobe, 1335	
John Cokham	1334	1335		
John Houton	1335	1337		
Richard Nateby	1337	1338	Controller of the Wardrobe, 1338	
William Dalton	1338	1344	Controller of the Wardrobe, 1344	
Richard Eccleshall	1334	1349 or 1350		
Unknown	(1350–1359)			
Thomas Brantingham	1359	1361	Keeper of the Wardrobe, 1368	
Unknown	(1361–1369)			
Richard Beverley	1369	1376	Keeper of the Wardrobe, 1376	
John Carp	1376	1390	Keeper of the Wardrobe, 1390	
John Stacy	1390	1395		
Thomas More	1395	1399	Keeper of the Wardrobe, 1401	
Unknown				
John Spencer	1413	1413	Keeper of the Great Wardrobe, 1413	
William Kinwolmarsh			In office during the reign of Henry V	
Unknown				
John Kendale	1461	1470		
John Elrington	1471	1474	Keeper of the Wardrobe, 1474	
Richard Jeny	1479			
James Blundell	1479	1481		
John Belle	1483	1485		
Laurence Warham	In office in 1485			
John Payne	1486	1492		
William Fisher	1492	1494		
William Cope	1494	1505		
Edward Cheseman	by 1508			
John Shurley	1509	1527		
Sir Edmund Peckham	1524 or 1527	1547		
John Ryther	1547	1552		
Thomas Weldon	1552	1553		
Sir Richard Freeston	1553	1557		
Michael Wentworth	1558	1558		
Thomas Weldon and Richard Ward	1558	1559		
Thomas Weldon	1559	1567		
Richard Ward	1567	1578		
Anthony Crane	1578	1580		
John Abingdon	1580	1582		
Gregory Lovell	1582	1597		
Sir Henry Cocke	1597	1610		
Sir Robert Vernon	1610	1615		
Sir Arthur Ingram	1615	1615	Suspended	
Sir Marmaduke Dayrell	1615	cont.		
Sir Marmaduke Dayrell and Sir Henry Vane	1625	1632		
Sir Henry Vane and Sir Roger Palmer	1632	1632		
Sir Roger Palmer	1632	1643		
William Ashburnham	1642	1646		
Commonwealth	(1649–1660)			
William Ashburnham	1660	1679		
Henry Brouncker, 3rd Viscount Brouncker, from 1684 Viscount Brouncker	1679	1685		
Sir Peter Apsley	1685	1689		
Francis Newport, 1st Viscount Newport, from 1694 Earl of Bradford	1689	1702		
Sir Benjamin Bathurst	1702	1704		
Francis Godolphin, from 1706 Viscount Rialton	1704	1711	First period in office; succeeded as Earl of Godolphin in 1712	
Samuel Masham, from 1712 Baron Masham	1711	1714		
Francis Godolphin, 2nd Earl of Godolphin	1714	1723	Second period in office	
William Pulteney	1723	1725	Created Earl of Bath in 1742	
Henry Clinton, 7th Earl of Lincoln	1725	1728		
Vacant	(1728–1730)			
Horatio Walpole	1730	1741	Created Baron Walpole in 1756	
Thomas Winnington	1741	1744		
Samuel Sandys, 1st Baron Sandys	1744	1744		
Edmund Waller	1744	1747		
Henry Pelham-Clinton, 9th Earl of Lincoln	1747	1754	Succeeded as Duke of Newcastle in 1768	
Sir George Lyttelton, 5th Baronet	1754	1756	Created Baron Lyttelton in 1756	
Thomas Osborne, 4th Duke of Leeds	1756	1761		
James Grenville	1761	1761		
Percy Wyndham-O'Brien, 1st Earl of Thomond	1761	1765		
Richard Lumley-Saunderson, 4th Earl of Scarbrough	1765	1766		
Hans Stanley	1766	1774		
Jeremiah Dyson	1774	1776		
Hans Stanley	1776	1780		
Francis Ingram-Seymour-Conway, Viscount Beauchamp	1780	1782	Succeeded as Marquess of Hertford in 1794	
