= John Barrow (canon of Windsor) =

John Barrow MA (1651 – 19 March 1684) was a Canon of Windsor from 1682 to 1684.

== Career ==
He was educated at St Edmund Hall, Oxford and graduated BA in 1672, and MA in 1674.

He was appointed:

- Chaplain to Sir William Temple, 1st Baronet, Ambassador to Holland
- Chaplain to Prince Rupert of the Rhine
- Vicar of New Windsor 1680

He was appointed to the twelfth stall in St George's Chapel, Windsor Castle in 1682, and held the stall until 1684.
