= Anthony Pearson (martyr) =

Anthony Pearson (or Pierson) was a 16th-century English Protestant who was executed for heresy during the reign of King Henry VIII of England. He is known as one of the Windsor Martyrs.

He was a regular and popular Protestant preacher in Windsor, Berkshire and at the country homes of the local Protestant gentry, including Thomas Weldon of Cannon Court, Cookham and Sir Philip Hoby of Bisham Abbey. He was convicted on the evidence of the former Mayor of Windsor, William Simonds, who was a Catholic. Simonds had a powerful friend in Bishop Gardiner's agent, Dr John London. Pearson and four others were arrested.

Three of them, Pearson, Robert Testwood and Henry Filmer, received the death sentence and were burned to death on 4 August 1543 in Windsor. When he reached the place of execution, Pearson embraced the post in his arms and kissed it, saying, "Now welcome, mine own sweet wife; for this day shalt thou and I be married together in the love and peace of God.".
