= John Merbecke =

C16 English composer and theologian

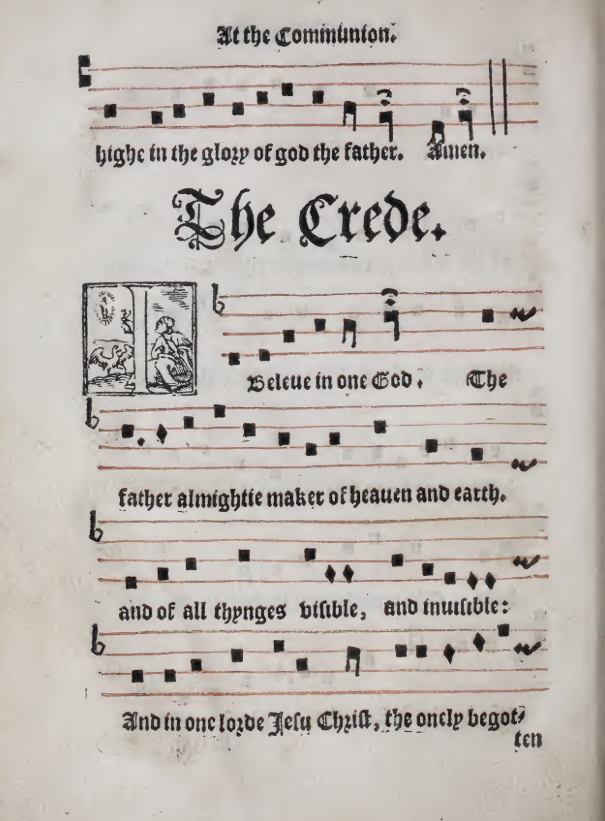
- Merbecke: The Book of Common Praier - the Creed for Holy Communion (1555) (1844 Facsimile).
- Born: c. 1515; Probably Beverley, England
- Died: c. 1585; Windsor, England

John Marbeck, Merbeck or Merbecke (c. 1510 – c. 1585) was an English choral composer and theological writer whose musical setting of the early Anglican liturgy standardised the sung Anglican service until the late 20th century. He is also known today for his setting of the Mass, Missa Per arma justitiae.

== Life ==
Probably a native of Beverley in Yorkshire, Merbecke appears to have been a boy chorister at St George's Chapel, Windsor, and was employed as an organist there from about 1541. Two years later he was convicted with four others of heresy and sentenced to be burnt at the stake, but received a pardon owing to the intervention of Stephen Gardiner, Bishop of Winchester, who said he was "but a musitian". An English Concordance of the Bible which Merbecke had been preparing at the suggestion of Richard Turner, was however confiscated and destroyed. A later version of this work, the first of its kind in English, was published in 1550 with a dedication to King Edward VI.

In the same year, Merbecke published his Booke of Common Praier Noted, intended to provide for musical uniformity in the use of the First Prayer Book of Edward VI. This set the liturgy to semi-rhythmical melodies partly adapted from Gregorian chant; it was rendered obsolete when the Prayer Book was revised in 1552. Merbecke wrote several devotional and controversial works, and a number of his musical compositions are preserved in manuscript in the British Library, and at Oxford and Cambridge. He died, probably while still organist at Windsor, about 1585.

His son, Roger Marbeck (1536–1605), was a noted classical scholar and physician.

== Legacy ==
In the first half of the 19th century, the Oxford Movement inspired renewed interest in liturgical music within the Church of England. John Jebb first drew attention to Merbecke's Prayer Book settings in 1841. In 1843, William Dyce published plainsong music for all the Anglican services, which included nearly all of Merbecke's settings, adapted for the 1662 Book of Common Prayer. During the latter half of the 19th century, many different editions of Merbecke's settings were published, especially for the Communion service, with arrangements by noted musicians such as Sir John Stainer, Charles Villiers Stanford and Basil Harwood, Merbecke's Communion setting was very widely sung by choirs and congregations throughout the Anglican Communion until the 1662 Book of Common Prayer began to be supplanted by more modern liturgy in the late 20th century. Parts of his service, notably the Nicene Creed, have been adapted to "modern" wording. His setting has also been adapted for the liturgy of many other denominations; the Catholic Church drew on it for the new English-language form of the Mass of Paul VI following the Second Vatican Council of 1962–65. The Personal Ordinariate of Our Lady of Walsingham uses Merbecke's settings for its own Divine Worship rite.

A voluntary choir for young men and women at Southwark Cathedral in London is named the Merbecke Choir in his honour, because Merbecke's heresy trial had been partly held at the church in 1543.

== Works ==
A list of selected works by Merbecke follows:

- Iohn Marbeck [i.e., John Merbecke]. A Booke of Notes and Common Places, with Their Expositions, Collected and Gathered out of the Workes of Diuers Singular Writers, and Brought Alphabetically into Order. A Worke both Profitable and also Necessarie, to Those that Desire the True Vnderstanding & Meaning of Holy Scripture. Imprinted at London: By Thomas East. OCLC 228714816.
