= Henry Filmer =

Henry Filmer (died 1543) was a 16th-century English Protestant martyr, one of the Windsor Martyrs, during the reign of Henry VIII.

Filmer was a Protestant tailor and church warden of St John the Baptist Church, Windsor, Berkshire who complained about the overly Catholic sermons of the vicar. He gained the support of the Bishop of Salisbury much to the consternation of a former Catholic mayor of the town, William Simonds. His powerful friend, Dr John London, who was Bishop Gardiner's agent, arrested Filmer, along with four others, and, on 4 August 1543, he, Robert Testwood and Anthony Pearson were burnt to death.
