= George Evans (antiquary) =

English antiquary

George Evans, D.D. (1630?–1701/2), was an English antiquary.

Evans was educated at Jesus College, Cambridge, where he graduated B.A. and became a fellow of Jesus in 1650, and graduated M.A. in 1653. He became vicar of New Windsor, and was installed Canon of Windsor 30 July 1660. He proceeded D.D. at Cambridge in 1665; was licensed to St. Benet Fink, London, 16 May 1663; and was also rector of Hitcham, Buckinghamshire. His son, George Evans, also a fellow of Jesus College, Cambridge, succeeded him at Benet Fink in 1693. He was a friend and correspondent of Elias Ashmole, and made collections relating to the history of St. George's Chapel, Windsor, printed in Ashmole's 'Berkshire,’ 1719.

He died 2 March 1701–2.
