= Henry Willis & Sons =

British pipe organ building company

Reading Town Hall organ, built by Willis in 1864, extended in 1882 and rebuilt by Harrison & Harrison in 1999

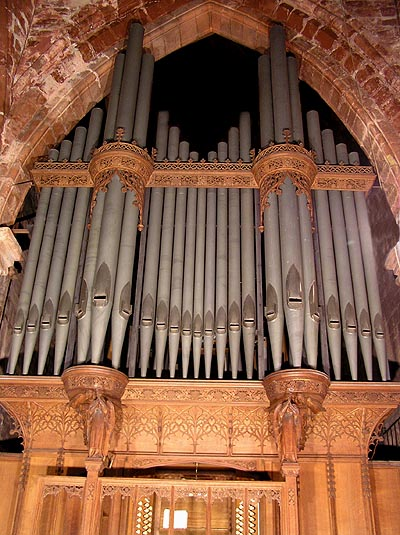
St Bees Priory organ, the last major instrument to be personally supervised by "Father" Henry Willis, 1899

Henry Willis & Sons is a British firm of pipe organ builders founded in 1845. Although most of their installations have been in the UK, examples can be found in other countries.

Five generations of the Willis family served as principals of the firm, until 1997, when Henry Willis 4 appointed as Managing Director, David Wyld; who subsequently became the majority shareholder.

Founded in London, at 2 & 1/2 Foundling Terrace, Gray's Inn Road, the firm later moved to a purpose-built works, designed by Henry Willis III, at Petersfield; and after acquisition by David Wyld, to its present base and head office in Liverpool.

== History ==
The founder of the company, the eponymous Henry Willis, was nicknamed "Father Willis" because of his contribution to the art and science of organ building and to distinguish him from his younger relatives working in the firm.

He was a friend of Samuel Sebastian Wesley whom he met at Cheltenham, and who was instrumental in gaining for Willis the contract for his first work on a cathedral organ, at Gloucester, in 1847.

The Willis firm is regarded as the leading organ builder of the Victorian era, itself a time when both civic and religious commitment led to the construction of a large number of impressive buildings and other public works. During the Industrial Revolution many towns equipped themselves with imposing town halls, preferably with a Willis instrument of the symphonic organ style, and a substantial (and similarly equipped) church. Industrialists competed to endow the most lavish halls and instruments. The result was a convergence of both a very fine and technically proficient organ builder, and a substantial number of commissions for really exceptional instruments. This heritage continues with recent new instruments in Florence (Italy) and Auckland (New Zealand).

As well as large organs, from around 1860 the firm made compact and lower-cost instruments suitable for smaller spaces such as the chancels of village churches. These were called Scudamore organs after their proponent, John Baron, who was rector of Upton Scudamore, Wiltshire.

In March 1919, Henry Willis & Sons merged with another prominent firm of organ builders, Lewis & Co, and traded under the name of Henry Willis & Sons and Lewis & Company Ltd. until 1923 when the reference to Lewis was dropped. The firm moved into Lewis's works at Brixton and remained there until it was destroyed by bombing during the London Blitz in 1941. The firm acquired A. Hunter & Son of Clapham in 1937.

== Notable Willis organs ==
The "Father" Willis's organ won a 'Council' gold medal in the Great Exhibition of 1851 at the Crystal Palace in Hyde Park, London. With 70 speaking stops this was the largest of the organs exhibited. The organ was later installed in Winchester Cathedral by the family firm (largely due to the initiative of Samuel Sebastian Wesley, the then Cathedral organist) after being reduced to 49 speaking stops, which was felt at the time to be an appropriate size for the Cathedral. When installed at Winchester in 1854, it was the first cathedral organ in the world to have thumb pistons and a concave and radiating pedalboard, both the inventions of "Father" Willis (in collaboration with Wesley in the case of the pedalboard) and now standard features of organs throughout English-speaking countries.

Famous "Father" Willis organs subsequently installed in cathedrals include those at St Paul's Cathedral in London, Lincoln Cathedral, Salisbury Cathedral, Truro Cathedral and Glasgow Metropolitan Cathedral.

The Reading Town Hall organ, built by Willis in 1864, consisted of three manuals, 26 stops and 1,660 pipes. It was a gift to the town from Reading Philharmonic Society at a cost of £770, including hydraulic blowing apparatus. The opening concert was held on 16 October, 1864, with Samuel Sebastian Wesley performing to an audience of 600. The organ was extended in 1882 and rebuilt by Harrison & Harrison in 1999.

The organ in the Chapel of King's College London, designed to complete the George Gilbert Scott interior, is of "Father" Willis origin and dates back to 1866.

The Grand Organ built by Henry Willis & Sons in 1871 for the Royal Albert Hall had four manuals (keyboards) and 111 stops and was, at that time, the largest in the world.

The organ at Union Chapel, Islington, was designed and built specially for the size and acoustics of the new Chapel building in 1877 by "Father" Willis, it was fully restored from 2013-2015 and it is notable for its fully working original hydraulic blowing system.

The Grand Organ built by Henry Willis & Sons between 1923 and 1926 at the Cathedral Church of Christ in Liverpool is the largest pipe organ in the UK, with two five-manual consoles, 10,268 pipes and a trompette militaire.

Windsor Castle had a Willis until it was destroyed by a fire in November 1992, as have Blenheim Palace and the Royal Academy of Music.

In Australia, a 4,600 pipes organ was installed at the Brisbane City Hall in Brisbane. This was built in 1892, and originally installed in the Brisbane Exhibition Building, then in 1927 moved to its current location.

Although four generations of Henry Willises are mostly remembered for organs on the grand scale, they also built smaller instruments. Seven examples exist in Australia, including the last one imported, the 1881 organ (Great: 5 stops; Swell: 4 stops; Pedal: 1 stop; 3 couplers) in All Saints Church, Bodalla, New South Wales, commemorating the 'father of Australian dairying', Thomas Sutcliffe Mort.

Norfolk Island has a small Willis organ comprising one manual of four and a half octaves, seven stops and 350 pipes. The organ, donated by Charlotte Yonge of England, arrived on Norfolk in 1876 and was installed in St Barnabas' church in 1880. In 1985, Henry Willis 4, great-grandson of the founder, travelled to the island to carry out restoration work on the instrument.

Henry Willis III built and worked on many organs across Britain, the most notable examples of his work (in addition to Liverpool Cathedral) being in Westminster Cathedral and Sheffield City Hall, both built in 1932. These organs both contain stops invented by the builder: the Sylvestrina at 8 foot pitch on the Choir divisions. In 1929, he rebuilt Father Willis' notable concert instrument at Alexandra Palace. The resulting instrument was said to eclipse any other Willis concert hall organ, and to be the finest concert organ in Europe.

== Sources ==
- Sumner, W L (1973). The Organ, its evolution, principles of construction and use. Macdonald and Jane's. ISBN 0-356-04162-X.
