= The Windsor Boys' School =

Comprehensive academy in Berkshire, England

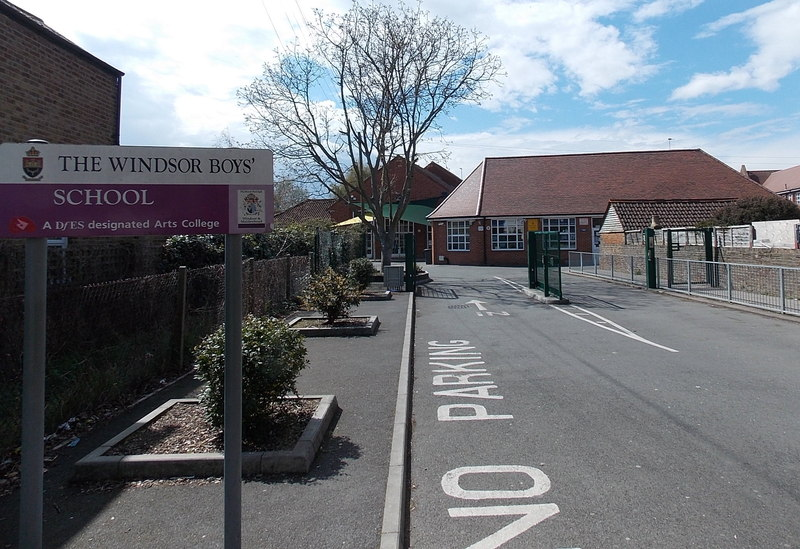
- Entrance to The Windsor Boys' School

Location
- Maidenhead Road; Windsor, Berkshire, SL4 5EH; England; 51.482586°N 0.62135°W

Information
- Type: Comprehensive academy
- Motto: Uno Animo (With one spirit)
- Established: 1908; 118 years ago
- Local authority: Windsor & Maidenhead
- Trust: Windsor Learning Partnership
- Department for Education URN: 141844 Tables
- Ofsted: Reports
- Head teacher: Sean Furness
- Gender: Boys
- Age: 13 to 18
- Enrolment: 966
- Houses: Allen; Burgess; Burnett; Ford; Lambdin; Ottrey; Warwick; Woodland
- Colours: Green, Amber and Dark Red
- Website: twbs.co.uk

The Windsor Boys' School is a comprehensive all-boys upper school and sixth form located on Maidenhead Road in Windsor, Berkshire, England, within the Royal Borough of Windsor and Maidenhead Local Authority. The school specialises in the arts.

== History ==
The school was previously known as both Windsor County Boys' School and later Windsor Grammar School. The school was established in 1908, and school celebrated its 100th anniversary on 22 September 2008. In 1921, it introduced a house system, with each house named after LCJ Burnett, JR Lambdin, JA Ottrey and LF Woodland, boys who each attended the school and died during World War I. By 1922, the school age had increased to 18 for more academically able boys, and in 1923, the first set of University scholarships were achieved by the school. It moved to the current site in 1939 officially opened by Alexander Cambridge, 1st Earl of Athlone on 18 January 1939.

It welcomed its first non-selective pupils in 1977, completing its transition from a grammar school into a comprehensive school. In 2022, it became a specialist Arts College and had become considered a "national leader in the provision of vocational education". The number of boys who attended the school who later went onto study at University after leaving the school reached one hundred per year, and the number of boys attaining 5 A* – C grades at GCSE rose to over 90%. On 1 March 2015 the school, together with Windsor Girls' School, became an academy within the Windsor Learning Partnership multi-academy trust.

== Houses ==
All students in the school are affiliated to one of the eight houses:

- Allen
- Burgess
- Burnett
- Ford
- Lambdin
- Ottrey
- Warwick
- Woodland

Each of the eight houses is named after an old boy who died in either the First or Second World Wars.

== Sports ==
The Windsor Boys' School has an active sports programme, and is particularly known for its performances in rugby, football and rowing.

=== Rowing ===
Windsor Boys' School Boat Club (opened in 1940) is one of the top school rowing clubs in the UK, and among the best sculling schools in the country. Rowers compete at regional and national school events and the club has produced several medallists in international competitions. The club is based in a boathouse situated on the Thames in Windsor, originally built by the Imperial Service College. The club's quad teams have won the Fawley Challenge Cup at the Royal Henley Regatta eight times in recent history. The most recent win was in 2024 beating Marlow Rowing Club in the final.

== Old Windsorians ==
- Oliver Mellor,British actor and former personal trainer, perhaps best known for playing the role of Dr Matt Carter in ITV soap opera Coronation Street.
- Stephen Grey, British investigative journalist and author, known for revealing details of the CIA's programme of extraordinary rendition.
- Tony Hayward, British businessman and former chief executive of oil and energy company BP.
- Peter Jones, British entrepreneur and businessman, investor on the television programme Dragons' Den.
- Martin Kemp, British art historian and Leonardo da Vinci specialist.
- Sir Peter James Luff, Chair of the National Heritage Memorial Fund and the National Lottery Heritage Fund. Member of Parliament (1997–2015), Defence Minister (2010–2012).
- Joe Morrison, football presenter on channels TEN Sports, TEN Action+, and SONY SIX.
- Adam Freeman-Pask, British International rower, World Bronze medallist, European Silver medallist and London 2012 Olympian.
- Ed Baker, British entomologist and bioacoustician.
- Will Quince, British Conservative politician and lawyer, Member of Parliament for Colchester.
- Jack Stacey, football player for Championship team Norwich City F.C.
- Charles Delacourt-Smith, Baron Delacourt-Smith, CH (1917–72), British trade unionist and Labour Party politician.
- Alan West, Baron West of Spithead, retired admiral of the Royal Navy, Under-Secretary of State (2007–10), First Sea Lord and Chief of the Naval Staff (2002–06).
- Alex Haydock Wilson, British track and field athlete representing Team GB, 2023 British 400 m Champion, and 2024 Olympic Games 4×400 m mixed relay bronze medalist
