= Edwin Baker =

Edwin Baker may refer to:

- Edwin Baker (CNIB) (1893–1968), Canadian co-founder of the Canadian National Institute for the Blind
- Edwin Baker (American football) (born 1991), American football running back
- Edwin T. Baker (1873–1936), member of the California Legislature
- Edwin Percy Baker (1895–1990), English lawn bowler
- C. Edwin Baker (1947–2009), American law professor
- J. Edwin Baker (1899–1963), American politician, a member of the Florida Senate

== See also ==
- Edward Baker (disambiguation)
