= Windsor Girls' School =

Location
- Imperial Road; Windsor, Berkshire, SL4 3RT; England

Information
- Type: Academy converter
- Motto: Aspire, Advance, Achieve
- Established: 1920
- Local authority: Windsor and Maidenhead
- Trust: Windsor Learning Partnership UID 5544
- Department for Education URN: 141852 Tables
- Ofsted: Reports
- Head of School: Ben Garner
- Gender: girls
- Age: 13 to 18
- Enrolment: 778
- Houses: 3
- Colour: Green
- Publication: The Windsorian
- Website: http://www.windsorgirls.net/

Windsor Girls' School (WGS) is an upper school for girls aged 13–18 in Windsor, Berkshire, England. While most other schools in Berkshire operate on a two-tier system with pupils entering secondary school at age 11, the local LEA uses the three-tier system, hence the 13+ entry age. It previously held Business & Enterprise specialist status and was rated "good, with outstanding features" by Ofsted inspectors in 2010. In 2014, the school was rated "outstanding", and in 2024 rated "requires improvement". Its partner school is The Windsor Boys' School.

== History ==
WGS was originally Windsor County Girls' School, a private school, during the inter-war period, founded in 1920, and later Windsor County Grammar School for Girls during the era of the tripartite system. It turned comprehensive during the 1970s when the system was abolished.

== Notable alumnae ==
- Geraldine McEwan, actress
- Lauren Aquilina, singer/songwriter

== Houses ==
- Carfax
- Elmfield
- Osborne
