= Robert Testwood =

Robert Testwood of London was an English Protestant martyr during the reign of Henry VIII, one of the Windsor Martyrs.

Testwood was a moderately well-known musician and gained a place as a chorister at Windsor College. He became embroiled in a number of arguments with the Windsor clergy, as well as the congregation. One, with a chantry priest, Mr. Ely, was about whether laymen should read the scriptures and whether the Pope should be the supreme head of the church in England. After asserting that men should read the scriptures and that the King should lead the church in England, Testwood was called 'the greatest heretic that ever came into Windsor' by Ely. However, Testwood became particularly hated for berating the pilgrims in St George's Chapel and for smashing the nose off the statue of the Virgin Mary there. He came to the attention of Bishop Gardiner, who sent his agent, Dr John London, to arrest him.

On the evidence of a former Mayor of Windsor, William Simonds, he and four others were condemned to death on 26 July 1543. However, only Testwood, Anthony Pearson and Henry Filmer were executed by burning at Windsor.
