= Orthopterology =

Study of grasshoppers and related insects

Orthopterology is the scientific study of the order Orthoptera, which includes grasshoppers, crickets, locusts and some other insects. Someone that studies in this field is an orthopterist.

The term is derived from the Ancient Greek words ὀρθός (orthós) and πτερόν (pterón), meaning straight and wing respectively, with the English suffix -logy.

A notable branch of orthopterology is acridology, which focuses on locusts and grasshoppers in the family Acrididae and is relevant to famine prevention.

== Famous orthopterists ==
- Boris Uvarov, often called the father of acridology.
- Daniel Otte
- Henri de Saussure

== Societies ==
- Association for Applied Acridology International
- Orthopterists' Society
- German Society for Orthopterology

== Journals ==
- Journal of Orthoptera Research

== See also ==
- LUBILOSA
