= Edward Baker (Worcestershire cricketer) =

English cricketer, WWII army captain

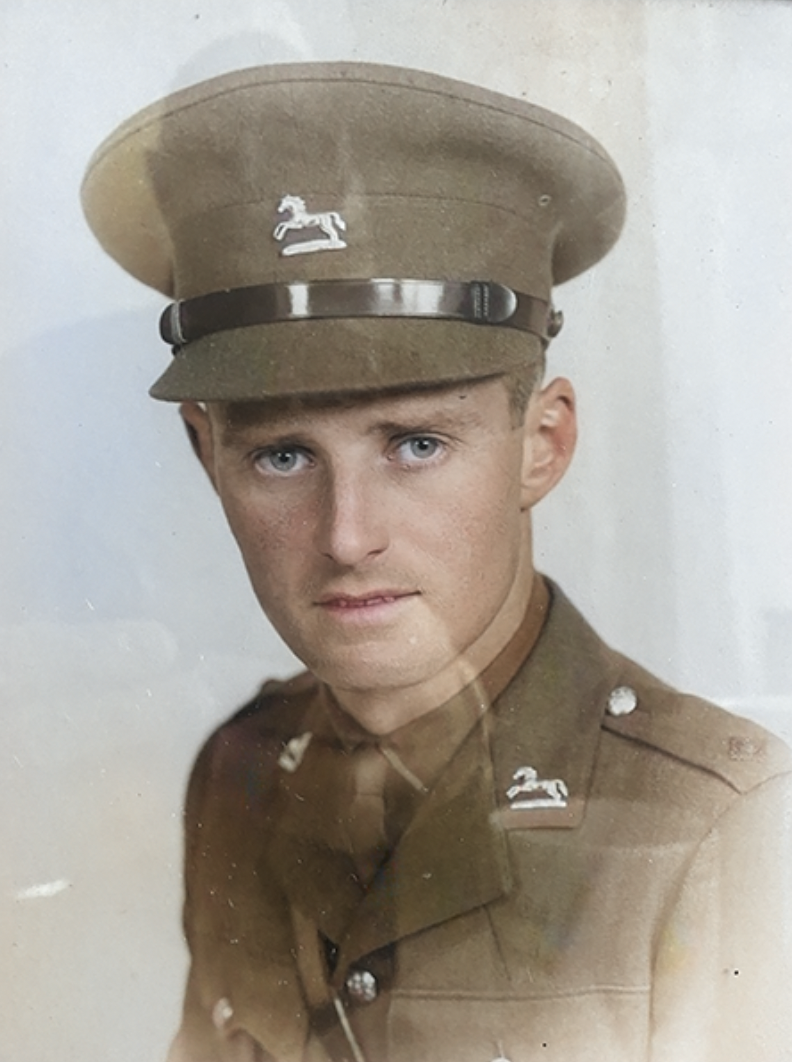

Personal information
- Full name: Edward Stanley Baker
- Born: 9 November 1910; Moseley, Birmingham, England
- Died: 15 March 1992 (aged 81); Great Dunmow, Essex, England
- Batting: Right-handed
- Role: Wicket-keeper

Domestic team information
- Years: Team
- 1933–1934: Worcestershire

Career statistics
Competition	FC
Matches	32
Runs scored	160
Batting average	6.40
100s/50s	0/0
Top score	21*
Balls bowled	0
Wickets	0
Bowling average	-
5 wickets in innings	0
10 wickets in match	0
Best bowling	-
Catches/stumpings	36/5
- Source: , 4 August 2008

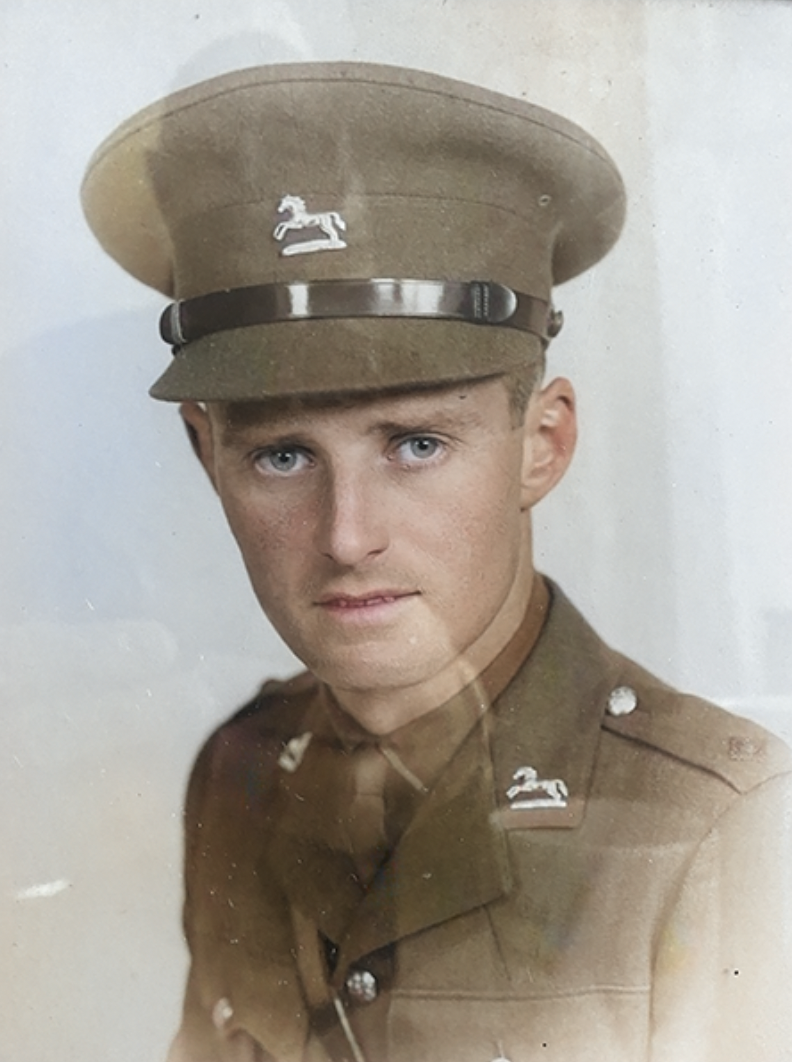

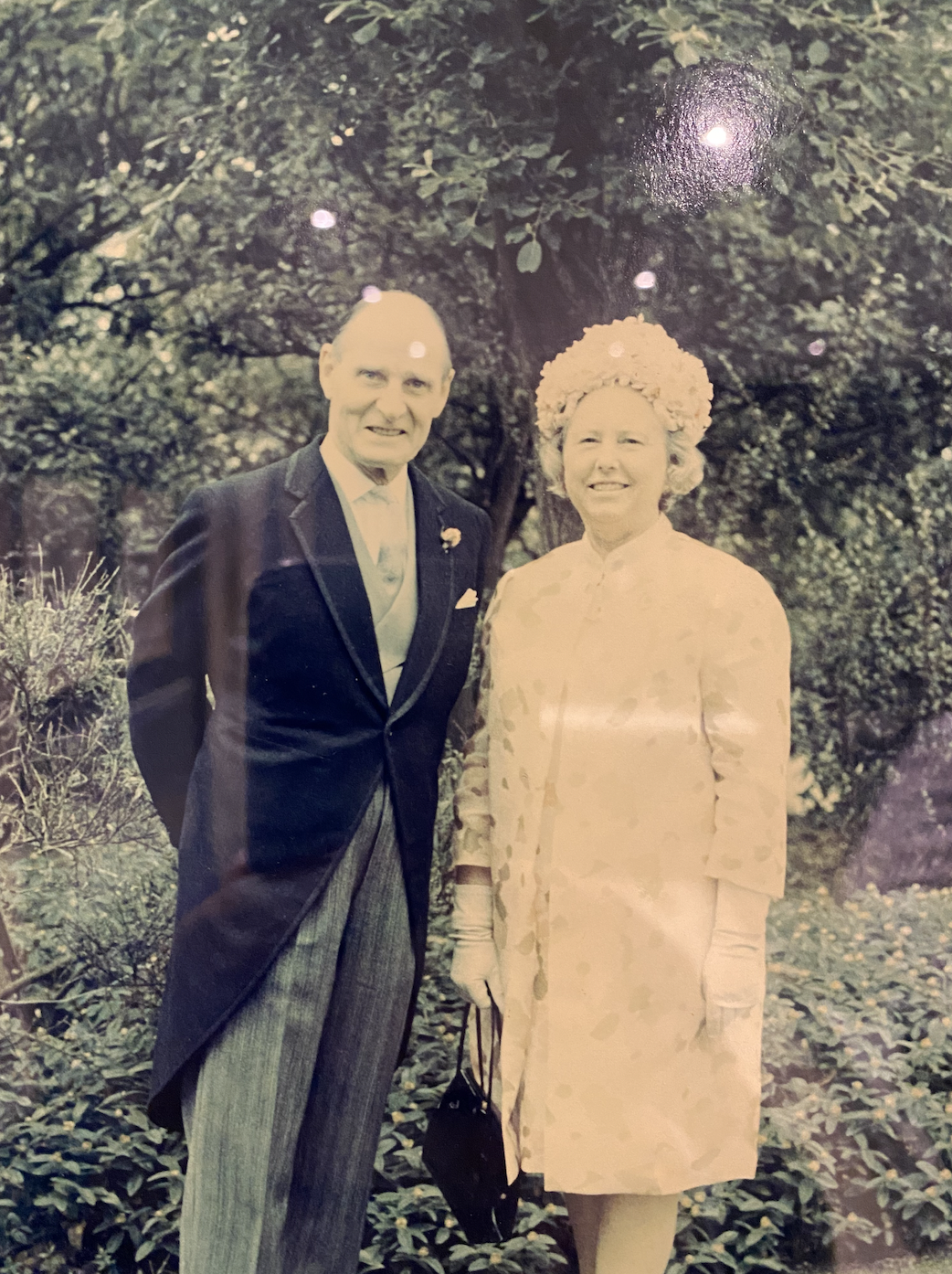

Edward Stanley Baker (9 November 1910 – 15 March 1992) was an English first-class cricketer: a wicket-keeper who played 32 first-class matches for Worcestershire in the 1930s.

== Cricket career ==
Baker attended, and played for, King Edward's School in Birmingham. He made his first-class debut for Worcestershire against Gloucestershire at Cheltenham in 1933, taking two catches and scoring 0 and 5. He appeared thrice more that summer, taking a single catch and scoring two runs in his final two innings.

In 1934 Baker was Worcestershire's regular wicket-keeper, a deliberate decision made by the county to allow Bernard Quaife to play as a specialist batsman. Baker played 28 times that summer, and ended the year with 38 dismissals (33 caught; five stumped), claiming a maximum of four dismissals in a single game, against Somerset in June.

Baker played no first-class cricket after the 1934 season.

== Military life ==
He was a captain in 17/21 Royal Lancers, was in the home forces from 1940/42 spending some time at Thetford. He was sent to North Africa Sudan/Tunis where he was wounded in his tank. He stayed in the army until the end of the war at home and spent some time at Debden where he was billeted at Shortgrove, Newport.

== Personal life ==
He married Winifred Marion Smith on 8 April 1940.

He worked in his father's business, Stanley of Colmore Row. As well as cricket he played rugby for the West Midlands.
