= A. Hunter & Son =

Organ builder in London

- Formerly: Hunter & Webb, Alfred Hunter
- Founded: 1856
- Founder: Alfred Hunter
- Defunct: 1937
- Fate: Acquired by Henry Willis & Sons
- Headquarters: Clapham, London, England, UK
- Area served: International
- Key people: Alfred Hunter, Henry Webb, Robert Hunter
- Products: Pipe Organ Builders

A. Hunter & Son (also known as Hunter & Webb and Alfred Hunter but generally referred to as Hunter) was an English pipe organ maker and refurbisher, established in London in 1856. Hunter was best known for the instruments at St Cuthbert's Philbeach Gardens and St James's, Spanish Place. The firm was acquired by Henry Willis & Sons in 1937.

== Alfred Hunter ==
Alfred Hunter (1827–1911) was born in Lambeth, the son of Frances Steare Hunter, a wax chandler, and his wife Mary. He was baptised at St Mary's, Lambeth in 1827. (St Mary's, Lambeth had a 1700 Renatus Harris organ; in 1918 Hunter's firm restored it, but the church was made redundant in 1972, and the organ was broken up.) He was apprenticed to George Maydwell Holdich, and then worked for Henry Bevington and JC Bishop (Holdich had been apprenticed to Bishop).

== Hunter organs ==
In 1851 he was a journeyman organ builder. In 1856 he entered into partnership with Henry Webb (1821-bef 1881), as Hunter & Webb, at 14A Griffin Street, York Road, Lambeth. Webb was also a former Bishop employee; Hunter and Webb's wives were sisters. The partnership was dissolved at the end of 1864, and Webb became a publican. Hunter then worked on his own account, as Alfred Hunter, until 1882, first at 13 Lower Kennington Green, then at 379 Kennington Road and finally at 65A (later renumbered as 87) High Street, Clapham. The Clapham High Street premises were purpose-built by the Tate philanthropist architect, Sidney Smith. Hunter was a churchwarden at Holy Trinity, Clapham Common, which has a Hunter organ.

In 1882 he entered into partnership with his son Robert (1856–1932), as A. Hunter & Son. The firm continued to trade in that style after Hunter's death in 1911. In 1928 it moved to 235 Queens Road, Battersea. In 1937 it was acquired by Henry Willis & Sons. Robert's sons Alfred Robert (1885–1971) and George Frederick (1889–1963) both also joined the firm; there is no record of them continuing to work as organ builders after the firm was sold to Willis in 1937. They are both recorded as retired organ builders in the 1939 register.

Hunter were specialists in pneumatic key action organs.

== Some Hunter organs ==
=== United Kingdom ===
- Royal Garrison Church, Old Portsmouth, Hampshire, 1872. The Hunter organ was modified at an unknown date by James Ivimey and rebuilt in 1969 by Henry Willis & Sons.

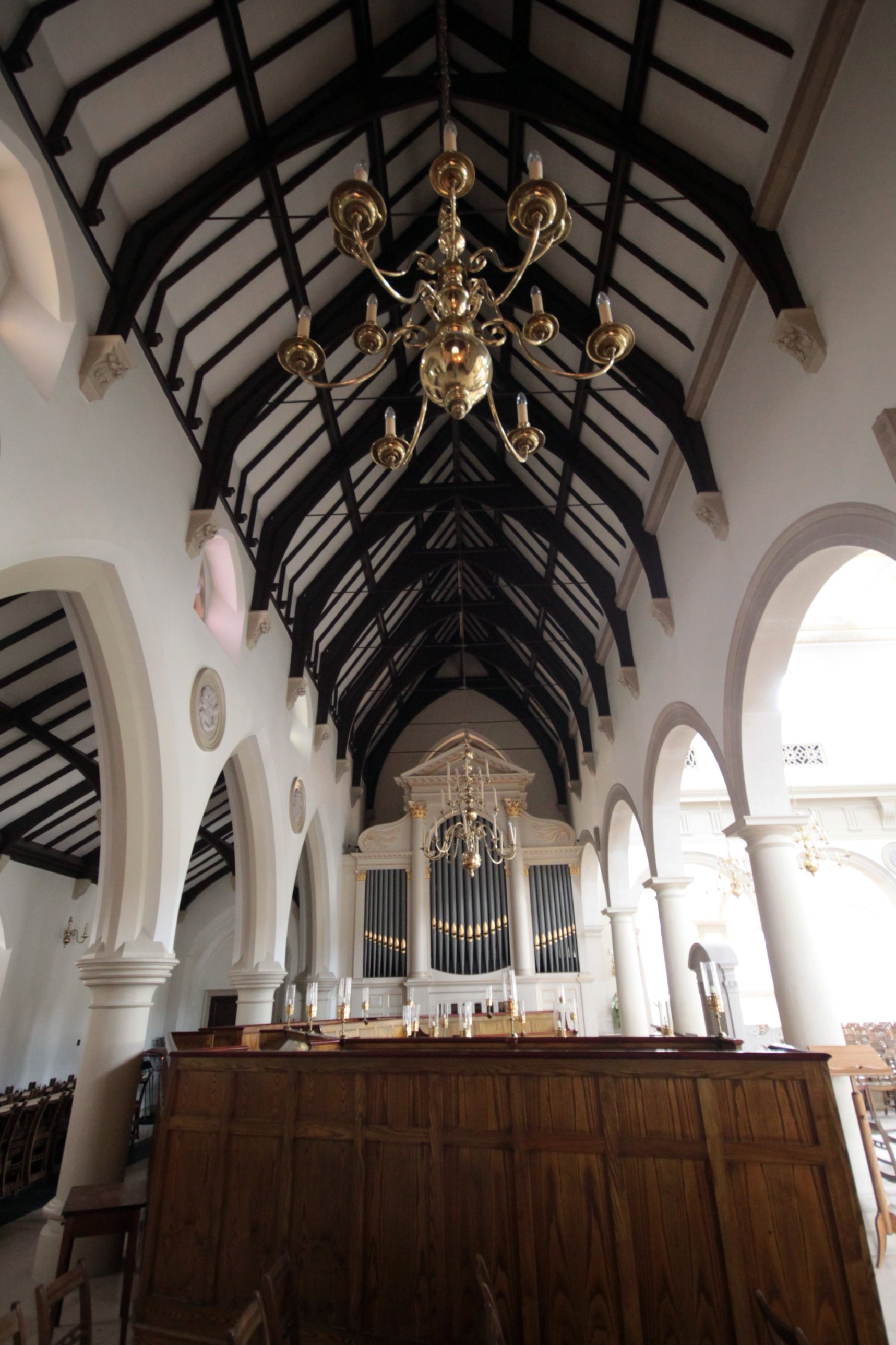
Hunter organ in Brentwood Cathedral

- St Mary-at-the-Walls, Colchester, Essex, 1883. The Hunter organ was rebuilt in 1931 by Hill, Norman & Beard. The church was made redundant in 1978, and the organ was reinstalled in Brentwood Cathedral by Percy Daniel in 1993.
- Portsmouth Cathedral, Hampshire, 1883. The Hunter organ was rebuilt in 1947 by J. W. Walker & Sons Ltd and again in 1974 by Eustace & Alldridge. The much-modified Hunter organ was replaced in 1994 by a new Nicholson & Co Ltd organ.
- St Michael Paternoster Royal, City of London, 1894. The Hunter organ replaced and was built inside the case of a 1749 Abraham Jordan Junior. It was badly damaged by wartime bombing, and only a small number of elements were salvaged and reused when the organ was rebuilt by Mander Organs in 1968 as part of the post-war restoration.

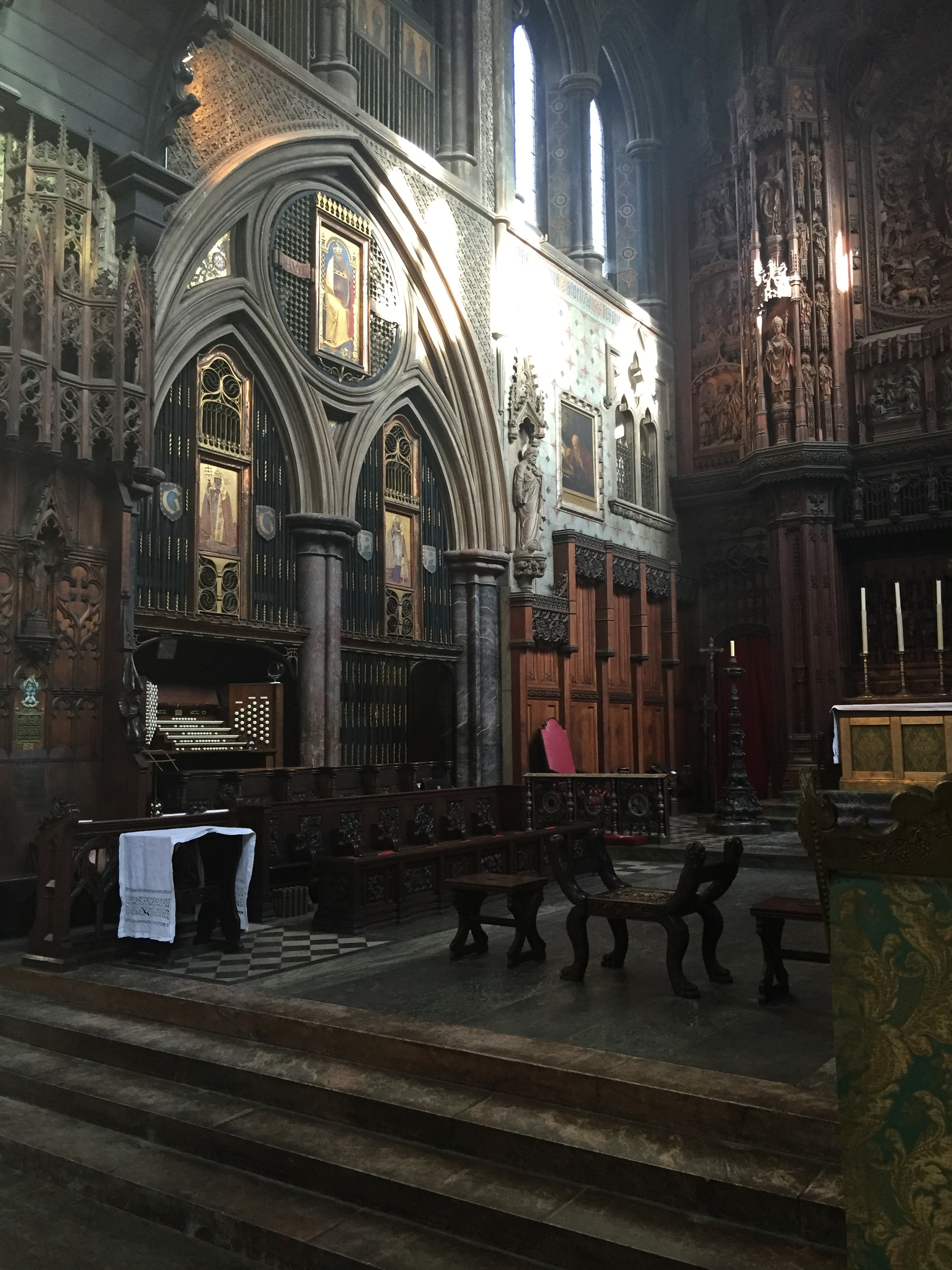
Hunter organ at St Cuthbert's, Philbeach Gardens

- St Cuthbert's, Philbeach Gardens, London, 1900. The four-manual Hunter organ was modified by John Compton in 1956 and 1963, and given an overhaul by B.C. Shepherd & Sons in 2003.
- St John the Baptist Church, Windsor, Berkshire, 1906. The three-manual Hunter organ was half-funded by Andrew Carnegie. The specification has been superseded by subsequent renovations.
- Welsh Church of Central London, Eastcastle Street, London, 1908. The three-manual Hunter was modified by Arthur Noterman in 1965 and completely restored by Nicholson & Co Ltd in 2018.
- All Souls', Langham Place, London, 1913. The three-manual Hunter was renovated in 1931, also by Hunter. It survived the war-time damage to the church, but needed to be rebuilt by Henry Willis & Sons in 1951. It was rebuilt again in 1976 by Harrison & Harrison.
- Sedbergh School Powell Hall, Sedbergh, Cumbria, 1919. Not to be confused with the organ in the School Chapel.
- St Mellitus, Tollington Park, London, 1920. Built as a war memorial for New Court Congregational Church, the Hunter organ was retained when the church became the Roman Catholic church of St Mellitus in 1959. Some modifications occurred in 1960 by Rushworth and Dreaper, in 2011 by B.C. Shepherd & Sons and in 2020 by F.H. Browne & Sons. The war memorial tablets themselves were lost, but rediscovered in the boiler room of the church that the Congregationalists moved to after they sold St Mellitus. The tablets were restored and rededicated at St Mellitus in 2014.
- St James's, Spanish Place, London, 1922. The Hunter organ has been restored by Bishop & Son in 1982 and 2008, but remains in its original tonal design.
- Queenswood School, Brookmans Park, Hertfordshire, 1928. The three-manual Hunter organ was modified by Henry Willis & Sons in 1938, and again in 1976, and then rebuilt in 1998 by Bishop & Son as a three-manual.
- Magdalene College Chapel, Cambridge, 1928. It was rebuilt by Henry Willis & Sons in 1939, and tonally and mechanically modernised in 1975 by Norman Hall but replaced in 2001 by a Goetze and Gwynn organ based on Father Smith principles.
- Swiss Church, Covent Garden, London, 1930. The Hunter organ was sold in 2008, and in 2013 installed and enlarged at Sherborne School for Girls.
- Hertford College Chapel, Oxford, 1931. The three-manual Hunter organ rebuilt a 1905 Lindsay Garrard organ.
- St James's Church, Draycot Cerne. 1900-01 for 3rd Earl Cowley, Prince Hatzfeldt and Rev R.E. Neville. The specifications were discussed between Meredith Meredith-Brown and Walter Galpin Alcock.
- Holy Trinity Church, Brimscombe, Nr Stroud, Glos.
- St Philip and St James Church, Leckhampton Cheltenham, Glos. Almost entirely unaltered.

=== Australia ===
- Methodist Church, Waverley, New South Wales, 1888. The three-manual Hunter was removed from the church when it was closed in 1971, and sold to Somerville House, an independent girls' school in Brisbane, Queensland and rebuilt by Whitehouse Bros. It was relocated within the school in 2001 by W.J. Simon Pierce.
- Wesley Uniting Church, Canberra, 1893. The organ at Wesley is the largest liturgical and recital instrument in the Australian Capital Territory. A three-manual Hunter organ was installed in Burwood Methodist Church in Sydney in 1893. John Bathgate installed most elements of the Hunter organ, along with some elements of a two-manual 1955 George Fincham & Sons organ. It was rebuilt by George Stephens in 2002.
- St Peter's Cathedral, Armidale, New South Wales, 1896. A two-manual Hunter organ replaced an earlier Fincham organ, incorporating some elements of it. The organ was restored by Peter Jewkes in 1996.
