= Ed Baker (entomologist) =

British entomologist and bioacoustician

Ed Baker FLS
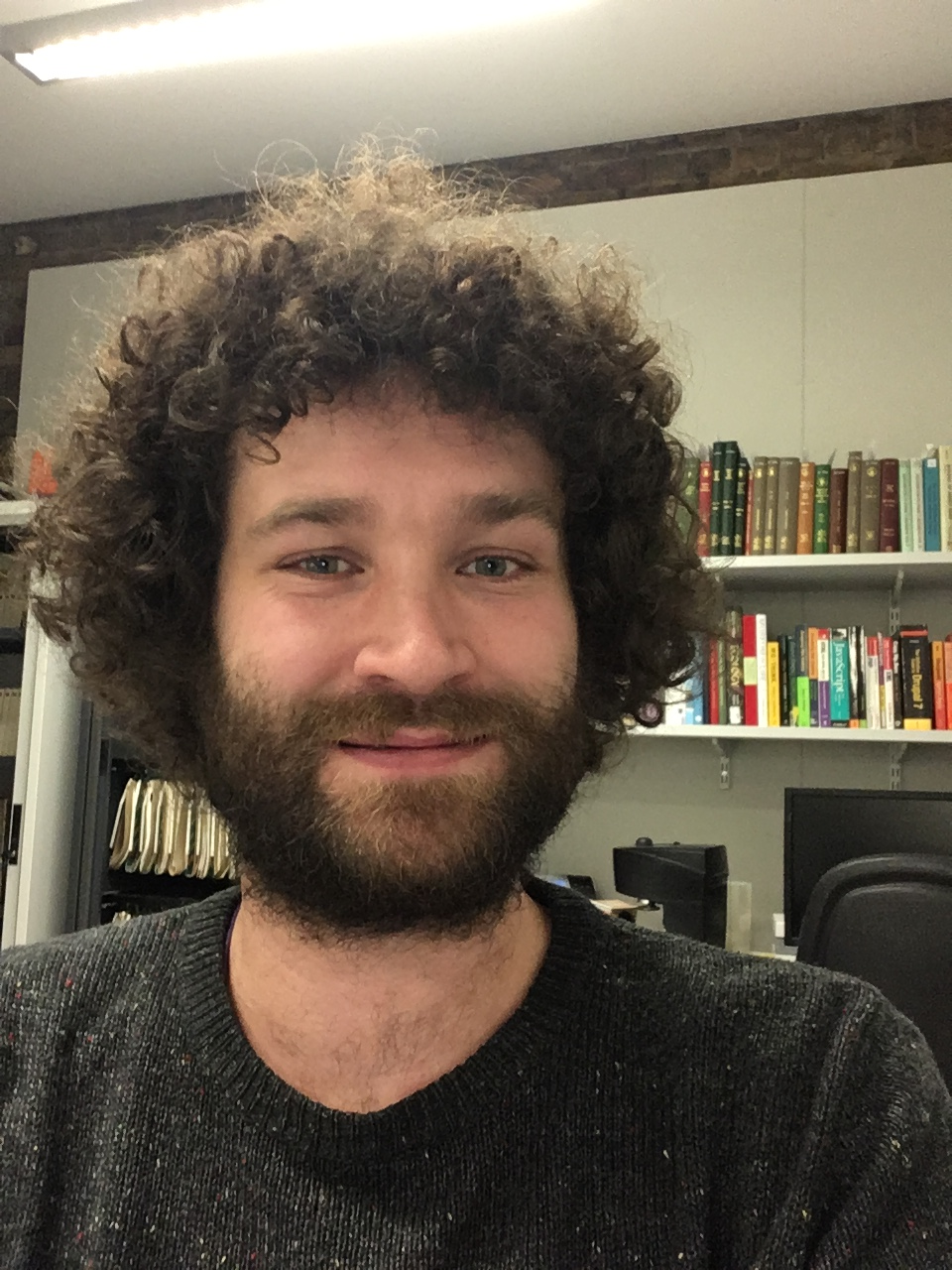
- Education: Imperial College London (BSc)
- Scientific career
- Fields: Bioacoustics; Soundscape ecology Biodiversity Informatics; Entomology; Orthopterology; Phasmatodea
- Workplaces: Natural History Museum, London, University of York, International Commission on Zoological Nomenclature
- Website: ebaker.me.uk

Edward Baker is a British entomologist, bioacoustician and orthopterist at the Natural History Museum, London.

== Education and career ==
Baker completed a bachelor's degree in physics at Imperial College London. His initial research at the Natural History Museum, London focussed on biodiversity informatics including work relating to implementing Biodiversity Information Standards (TDWG), and building systems for the broader community including development of the Scratchpads virtual research environment and the eMonocot project.. It was during this time he discovered the museum's library of recorded insect sounds and begin the process of digitising these to make them available via the BioAcoustica project, and separately began work on open hardware sensors for environmental monitoring.

While at the museum he was seconded to the International Commission on Zoological Nomenclature as an informatics advisor, as well as helping with the management of Cases brought before the commission.

== Research ==
In 2017 Baker became a researcher in the Electronic Engineering faculty at the University of York combining his interest in sensors and entomology to design devices for the automated recognition of the songs of orthoptera in the field. He has subsequently collaborated with historians at the university on the archive of the Anti-Locust Research Centre held at the Natural History Museum, London.

In 2022 Baker returned to the Natural History Museum, London as acoustic biology researcher to continue his work on sensor networks, automated acoustic monitoring, machine learning and the use of acoustic and vibrational communication by animals. This work has a particular focus on the use of acoustic techniques in heavily urban areas using high-density microphone arrays.

== Honorifics ==
The species Calvisia bakeri Seow-Choen, 2017 is named after Baker.

== Film credits ==
Baker was credited for supplying recordings of mole crickets for the film The Duke of Burgundy directed by Peter Strickland, and as an animal wrangler for a cockroach in the Marianna Simnett film Blue Roses.

== Outreach ==
Baker was involved in Sophie Scott's Royal Institution Christmas Lectures in 2017 demonstrating hissing cockroaches.
