= Edward Baker (Kent cricketer) =

English cricketer (1846–1913)

Personal information
- Born: 9 February 1846; Plaxtol, Tonbridge, Kent
- Died: 30 June 1913 (aged 67); Maidenhead, Berkshire
- Height: 6 ft 0 in (1.83 m)
- Batting: Right-handed
- Bowling: Right-arm medium
- Role: Bowler

Domestic team information
- Years: Team
- 1875: Kent
- Only FC: 26 July 1875 Kent v Lancashire
- Source: Cricinfo, 8 March 2017

Edward Baker (9 February 1846 – 30 June 1913) was an English cricketer. He played one first-class match for Kent County Cricket Club in 1875.

Baker was born at Plaxtol near Tunbridge Wells in Kent in 1846. He was the youngest son of William and Mary Baker, his father operating a butchers shop and working as a farrier. Baker grew up in Plaxtol before the family moved to Wrotham near Sevenoaks. By the time he was 15 he was working as a butcher with his father and brother.

A right-arm medium pace bowler described as having a "high arm" action, Baker was also employed as a professional cricketer, working in 1871 at Kersal in the Manchester area. After impressing with five wickets in a match for the Players of Tonbridge in July 1875, he was chosen to play for Kent against Lancashire at Old trafford later in the month. He took a single wicket in the match and was run out twice without scoring. This proved to be his only first-class match, although he is known to have continued to play club cricket and umpire in local matches.

Baker later became a publican, first at Chagford in Devon and later at Maidenhead in Berkshire. He married his wife Mary in Devon; the couple had six children. He continued to coach cricket. Baker died at Maidenhead in 1913 aged 67.

== Bibliography ==
- Carlaw, Derek (2020). Kent County Cricketers, A to Z: Part One (1806–1914) (PDF). Cardiff: ACS.
