= Windsor Martyrs =

Three English Protestant martyrs

The Windsor Martyrs were English Protestants martyred at Windsor in 1543. Their names were Robert Testwood, Anthony Pearson and Henry Filmer.

In 1543, during the reign of Henry VIII, the three Windsor Martyrs were arrested by Bishop Gardiner's agent, Dr John London, on the evidence of William Simonds, the Catholic former Mayor of Windsor, who had a grudge against them.

John Marbeck and Robert Benet were also arrested, but were later released.

The three were condemned on 26 July, after Simonds threatened the jurors, and burnt to death on 4 August on the site of the Windsor & Eton Riverside railway station.

Their story was recorded in Foxe's Book of Martyrs. According to Foxe, "many who saw their patient suffering confessed that they could have found in their hearts to have died with them", although the Vicar of Bray, who was also watching, decided he would change with the times in order to prevent the same from happening to him.

== See also ==
- List of Protestant martyrs of the English Reformation
