= John London (priest) =

English priest and educator (c. 1486–1543)

John London, DCL (c. 1486 – 1543) was Warden of New College, Oxford, and a prominent figure in the dissolution of the monasteries during the reign of Henry VIII of England.

== Early life and career ==
London was born in Hambleden, Buckinghamshire, son of an Oxfordshire tenant farmer. London was educated as a scholar at Winchester College from 1497, and at New College, Oxford from 1503. In 1505 he became a fellow of New College, and became a Doctor of Civil Law (DCL) in 1519.

London also held a range of administrative roles within the church during this period: he became prebendary of York in 1519, and Treasurer of Lincoln Cathedral in 1522. He was also Domestic Chaplain to Archbishop Warham about this time, and many of the relationships he formed in Warham's service remained influential throughout his career.

He returned to Oxford as Warden of New College in 1526, and held the post until 1542. His time as Warden was marked by religious turbulence and lack of discipline, and frequent complaints by and clashes with fellows of the college.

== Role in the Reformation ==
The 17th-century historian and biographer John Strype described London as "a great dignitary, and a great champion for the Pope"; London's near-contemporary Archbishop Matthew Parker was less flattering in describing him as "a stout and filthy prebendary".

London began to play a role as a persecutor of Oxford evangelicals and Lutherans in the late 1520s. Those who came to his attentions included members of New College. One of these men, Quinby, was kept imprisoned in the college and died there, weakened by hunger and cold. He appears to have taken a more lenient approach with members of his own family: his nephew Edward Planckney (also a member of New College) confessed in 1534:

States that on reading the treatise of articles devised by the King he had been convinced that the supremacy of the bishop of Rome was without foundation, and had written a little declamation. For this he was suspected, his papers searched and delivered to Dr. London, who sent for him at 5 a.m. and kept him in his garden till 10. "Edward," he said, "you be my nephew.... I have now sent for you only to give you counsel, that if God has endued you with any grace you may return to grace again." He then charged the deponent with writing many detestable heresies against the bishop of Rome, which made him so pensive, that he knew not what to say for the deponent's shame or for his poor mother. And further, at his last being with the bishop of Winchester at his visitation, the Bishop did rejoice "that this our university was so clear from all these new fashions and heresies." But now he would hear that it was infected by one of his own college. He urged that their ancestors could not have erred so many hundred years, and that this world could not continue long; for though the King has now conceived a little malice against the bishop of Rome because he would not agree unto this marriage, "I trust," he said, "that the blessed King will wear harness on his own back to fight against such heretics as thou art."

After Thomas Cromwell's execution in 1540, London became closely associated with the religious conservative Stephen Gardiner, Bishop of Winchester. Through his association with Gardiner, London became involved in seeking out evidence against Protestant heretics in Windsor and was Gardiner's chief agent in the town. This culminated in the burning at the stake of the Windsor Martyrs, and a long description of this incident is given in Foxe's Martyrs.

== Role in the dissolution of the monasteries ==
In 1534 Henry VIII broke with the Pope and by the Act of Supremacy made himself the supreme head of the church in his lands. In early 1535, Thomas Cromwell was commissioned by the King to organise visitations of all the country's churches, monasteries and clergy, to enable the government to tax church property more effectively. London was appointed as a commissioner for the visitation of monasteries in 1535, a role he held until 1538. Once the initial reports from the visitations were received, the dissolution of the monasteries began in 1536. London was responsible for the dissolution of houses in Oxford, Reading, Warwickshire, and Northamptonshire.

London became associated with Cromwell in the early 1530s in his capacity as Warden of New College (the Dictionary of National Biography describes him as "one of his most active and subservient agents") and surviving records show that London frequently made gifts to Cromwell, some of them quite valuable.

While London's religious views adhered to Rome rather an evangelical or Protestant viewpoint, and he was a reformer rather than a suppressor, he appears to have had no sympathy for the medieval traditions of the church and was at pains to emphasise to Cromwell that he was not "addicted to superstition". The conservatism and anti-Protestant nature of his religious views may have contributed to his need to make repeated protestations of his loyalty and dedication to Cromwell.

His career as a commissioner was noted not only for the destruction of relics and other fittings considered idolatrous, but also for inflicting physical damage on the buildings. London's own account to Cromwell of his visitation of Reading Abbey sets out the process of destroying parts of the abbey, leaving others that might be of use untouched, expelling the friars and seizing the relics and other property to be put to the King's financial benefit. Some more recent commentators have suggested that he was one of the more moderate agents of the dissolution process, given his views with regard to the monks and nuns displaced by the process.

During his visitations, he was accused of corrupting nuns at Chepstow in 1537 and improper behaviour towards the nuns of Godstow in 1538, although London strongly defended his behaviour at Godstow in correspondence with Cromwell. London noted in 1539 that the dissolution of the monasteries was popular with many of the younger nuns; many were committed to nunneries at a very young age and lived in "imperfect chastity". Parliament decreed that those who had been professed under the age of 21 were allowed to marry.

During this period, London continued to acquire senior roles within the church, mostly located near Oxford. He was the first dean of the Diocese of Oxford when the diocese was founded in 1542 at Osney Abbey (the seat of the diocese was re-located to Christ Church Cathedral, Oxford, in 1545, after London's death). He was also a Canon of Windsor from 1540 to 1543.

== Disgrace and death ==
London's behaviour, particularly towards women, caused him difficulty at different points in his career. While in Oxford, he was punished with public penance for adultery with a mother and daughter:

This Dr. London, for his incontinency, afterwards did open penance in Oxford, having two smocks on his shoulders for Mrs. Thykked and Mrs. Jennyngs, the mother and the daughter: with one of whom he was taken by Henry Plankney in his gallery, being his sister's son. This was known to a number in Oxford and elsewhere, many years after living, as well as to Loud, the relater of it in a letter to Mr. Fox.

London's final downfall came in 1543 when he became involved in the Prebendaries' Plot, an attempt to oust the Protestant reformer Thomas Cranmer from office as Archbishop of Canterbury by bringing charges of heresy against him. London acted alongside Bishop Gardiner to agitate against Cranmer in Windsor. King Henry VIII chose to stand by Cranmer, and London took much of the blame for the plot, possibly to protect Gardiner. Letters by London intended for Bishop Gardiner were intercepted, which exposed his role in the conspiracy, and he was convicted of perjury. Part of his punishment was to ride through Windsor, Reading and Newbury seated backwards on a horse, and to be pilloried in each of those towns. He was then stripped of his various dignities and incarcerated in the Fleet Prison in London, where he "ended his naughty life in prison" and died soon after "of shame and vexation".

== See also ==
- List of Wardens of New College, Oxford
- Dean of Christ Church
- Dean and Canons of Windsor

== Footnotes ==
Academic offices
Preceded by John Young	Warden of New College, Oxford; 1526–1542	Succeeded by Henry Cole
