= Godfrey Webster =

Godfrey Webster may refer to:

- Sir Godfrey Webster, 4th Baronet (1747–1800), Member of Parliament (MP) for Seaford 1786–1790 and Wareham 1796–1800
- Sir Godfrey Webster, 5th Baronet (1789–1836), MP for Sussex 1812–1820

== See also ==
- Webster baronets
- Sir Godfrey Webster (1799 ship)
