= Thomas Blague =

English churchman and author

Thomas Blague (or Blage) (c.1545–1611) was an English churchman and author. He was the dean of Rochester beginning in 1592.

== Life ==
He matriculated at Queens' College, Cambridge in 1568. He is believed to have graduated B.A and was B.D. from Oxford in 1574. He then received his D.D. from Cambridge in 1589.

He was admitted on 9 September 1570 to the rectory of Braxted Magna in Essex, but was a non-resident. On 2 September 1571, being B.A., he was presented to the church of St. Vedast, Foster Lane, London. On 20 July 1580, he was presented by the queen to Ewelme, Oxfordshire, which he resigned in 1596. On 2 April 1582, at Oxford, being described as 'student in divinity' and one of the chaplains in ordinary to the queen, he supplicated for D.D.. On 1 February 1591, by then D.D., he was installed dean of Rochester in the place of John Coldwell.

In 1602 he, as dean, presented John Wallis (or Wallys), father of the more famous Dr. John Wallis, to the living of Ashford, Kent. In 1604 he was appointed rector of Bangor, but never resided. He died 11 October 1611. He had a son named John, who, in his father's lifetime, was a commoner of Oriel College, Oxford.

== Works ==
He was the author in early life of A Schoole of wise Conceytes. It is a collection of fables in the style of Aesop, and is thought to have drawn on material related to the Dialogus creaturarum. He actually used 19 authors, both classical and Renaissance humanists including Erasmus. In 1603 he printed and published a sermon on I Psalm i. 1-2, which had been preached at the Charter House.
