= Westminster v Charterhouse, 1794 =

Pupils of Westminster School and Charterhouse School played a cricket match in London on 5 August 1794 which was recorded in the earliest known scorecard of a schools match.

== Description ==
A notebook compiled by G. B. Buckley held in the library at Lord's Cricket Ground contains the score of a match sourced from The Star, published on 7 August 1794. The match took place at the Dorset Square ground on Tuesday 5 August 1794 between teams of the City of London and the City of Westminster. A comparison with the Charterhouse and Westminster school registers shows that this was a match between pupils of Charterhouse and Westminster. The match preceded by two years the first fixture between Westminster and Eton on which occasion Dr. George Heath flogged the whole Eton XI on their return. The first recorded Eton-Harrow match did not take place until 1805.

According to H. T. Waghorn the match was played for 500 guineas, although this has been questioned.

== Scorecard ==
London

Name	First innings	score	Second innings	score
Lloyd, sen.	b Stevens	0	c Cummins	9
Stert	b Atterbury	5	b Atterbury	0
Ashurst	c Burrell	16	b Atterbury	4
Kemp	b Stevens	4	not out	0
Lloyd, jun.	b Stevens	2	c Atterbury	1
Palmer, sen.	b Atterbury	3	run out	1
Stone	run out	6	b Atterbury	4
Palmer, jun.	not out	3	b Coffield	0
Blake	b Wynn	0	run out	0
Surtes	b Wynn	0	c Coffield	1
Austin	b Wynn	0	run out	1
	Byes	3	Byes	3
		42		24

Westminster

Name	First innings	score
Atterbury	b Stert	29
Stevens	b Kemp	26
Cummins	b Kemp	37
Coffield	b Stert	20
Burrell	b Kemp	7
Horsley	b Kemp	10
Graham	c Stert	7
Curtis	b Kemp	7
French	b Kemp	0
Wynn	not out	16
Ridley	c Palmer, sen.	2
	Byes	3
		171

The scorecard does not reflect the Westminster total which actually adds up to 165.

== Players ==
All the Westminsters were still at school, but several of the Carthusians had already left

=== Charterhouse School (City of London) ===
- Ashurst: William Henry Ashurst (1778–1846)
- Austin: Either John Austen (1777–1851) or Henry Austen (1779–1850), second cousins of Jane Austen
- Blake: Arthur Garland Blake (1779–1812) In service of the East India Company
- Kemp: Rev. Edward Kempe (1778–1858) Curate of Bitton. After his death his executors found nearly a ton of sermons in his house, many of which he never preached.
- Lloyd sen. and Lloyd jun: Probably Edward Lloyd (1776–1805) and William Lloyd (1778–1831), sons of the preacher of Charterhouse, but Lloyd jun. might be Charles Lloyd (1779–1809)
- Palmer, sen.: Rev. William Jocelyn Palmer (1776–1853) Rector of Mixbury and father of Roundell Palmer, 1st Earl of Selborne
- Palmer, jun.: John Horsley Palmer (1779.1858) Governor of the Bank of England
- Stone: Either Richard Stone (1775–1849) or Henry Stone (1777–1845)
- Stert: Arthur Stert (1776–1849)
- Surtes: Aubone Surtees (1777–1859)

=== Westminster School (City of Westminster) ===
- Atterbury: Rev. Charles Lewis Atterbury (1778–1823) Fellow of Christ Church, Oxford - killed in a coach crash
- Burrell: Either Percy Burrell (1779–1807) or Walter Burrell (1777–1831).
- Coffield: Caulfield, whose name appears in the 1795 School list. He played v Eton 1796.
- Cummins: Rev. Henry Comyn (1777–1851) enumerator of the New Forest and vicar of Sancreed and Manaccan
- Curtis: Rev. Whitfeld Curteis (1780?-1834). Played v Eton 1796 Rector of Burwash Sussex and Smarden Kent
- French: Savage Towgood French (1777?-1834) Barrister
- Graham: Either G. Graham, in School lists 1795 and 1797, or T. Graham, in School list 1797. One of these played v Eton, 1799.
- Horsley: Rev. Heneage Horsley (1776–1847) dean of Brechin
- Ridley: Either Matthew White Ridley (1778–1836) or Henry Colborne Ridley (1780–1830)
- Stevens: Rev. Robert Stevens (1778?-1870) Played v. Eton 1796
- Wynn: Charles Wynne Griffith-Wynne (1780–1865) MP for Caernarvonshire

== See also ==
- 1794 English cricket season
