= William Busby =

William Busby may refer to:

- William Busby (priest)
- William Busby (politician)
