= Thomas Dampier (priest) =

British priest

Thomas Dampier (died 1 August 1777) was Dean of Durham from his installation on 17 June 1774 until his death.

He was King's Scholar at Eton College and then educated at King's College, Cambridge, becoming Fellow in 1735, BA in 1736, MA in 1741 and DD in 1755.

He was Lower Master of Eton College in 1745, Prebendary of Canterbury 1765-1769 and Fellow of Eton 1767.

In 1769 he was appointed Canon of the fifth stall at St George's Chapel, Windsor Castle, a position he held until 1774.

He was appointed Prebendary of the second stall at Durham in 1771, and resigned in 1773 for the Master of the Hospital at Sherburn, Durham 1773–1774. He resigned as a Canon of Windsor on being appointed Dean of Durham in 1774.

His son, also called Thomas, was Dean of Rochester from 1782 to 1802; Bishop of Rochester from 1802 to 1808; and Bishop of Ely from 1808 until 1812.

Church of England titles
Preceded by Spencer Cowper	Dean of Durham; 1774–1777	Succeeded by William Digby
