= James Graham Goodenough =

Royal Navy officer (1830-1875)

Captain James Goodenough CB CMG
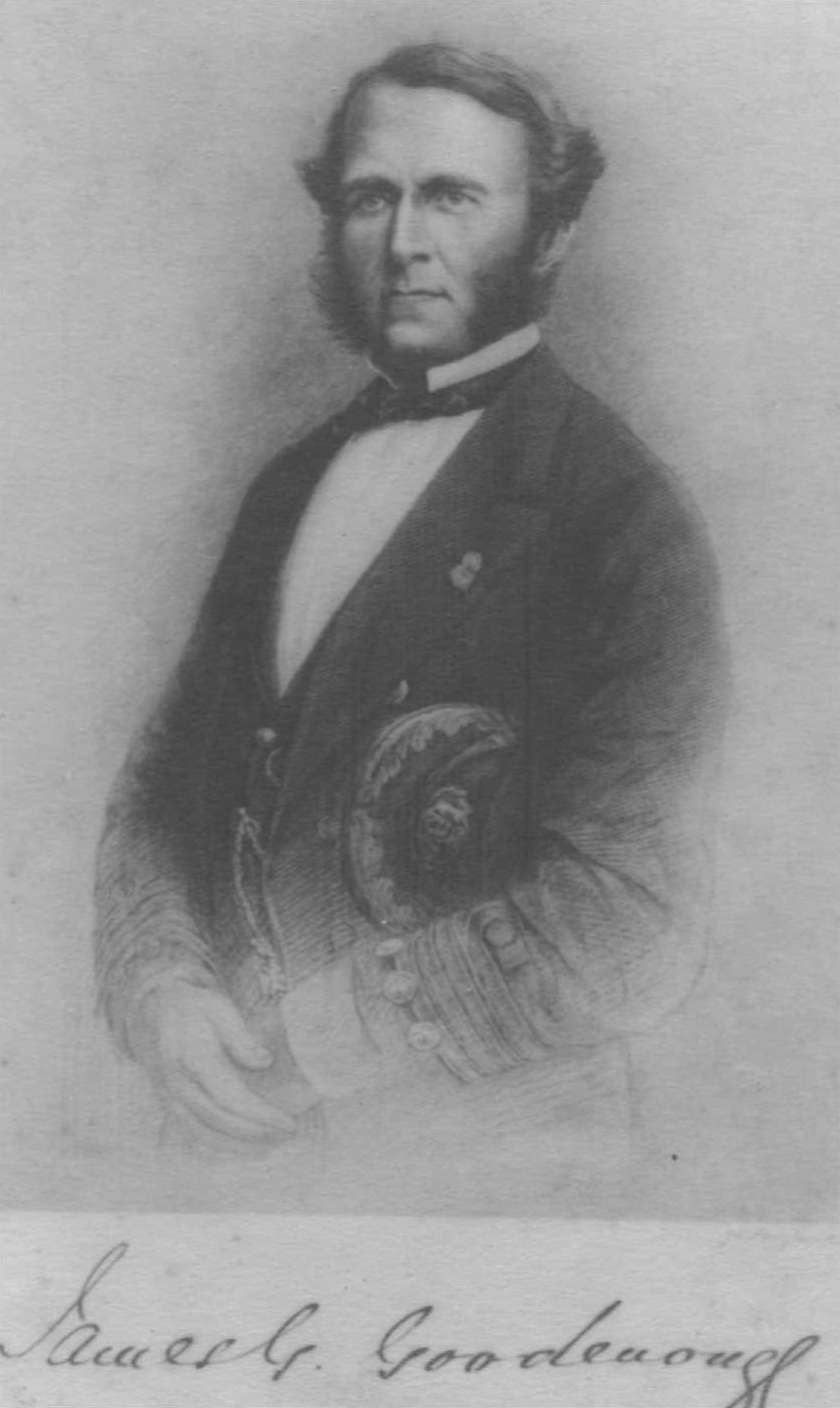
- Born: 3 December 1830; Guildford, Surrey
- Died: 20 August 1875 (aged 44); Coral Sea near Santa Cruz Islands
- Cause of death: Tetanus
- Burial place: St Thomas' Anglican Church, North Sydney, Australia
- Military career
- Allegiance: United Kingdom
- Branch: Royal Navy
- Service years: 1844–1875
- Rank: Captain
- Commands: HMS Victoria; HMS Minotaur; Australia Station (1873–1875)
- Conflict: Second Opium War
- Awards: Companion of the Order of the Bath; Companion of the Order of St Michael and St George
- Education: Westminster School
- Spouse: Victoria Hamilton (m. 1864)
- Parents: Edmund Goodenough (father); Frances Cockerell (mother)
- Relatives: William Goodenough (son); Samuel Goodenough (grandfather); William Howley Goodenough (brother); Samuel Pepys Cockerell (maternal grandfather)

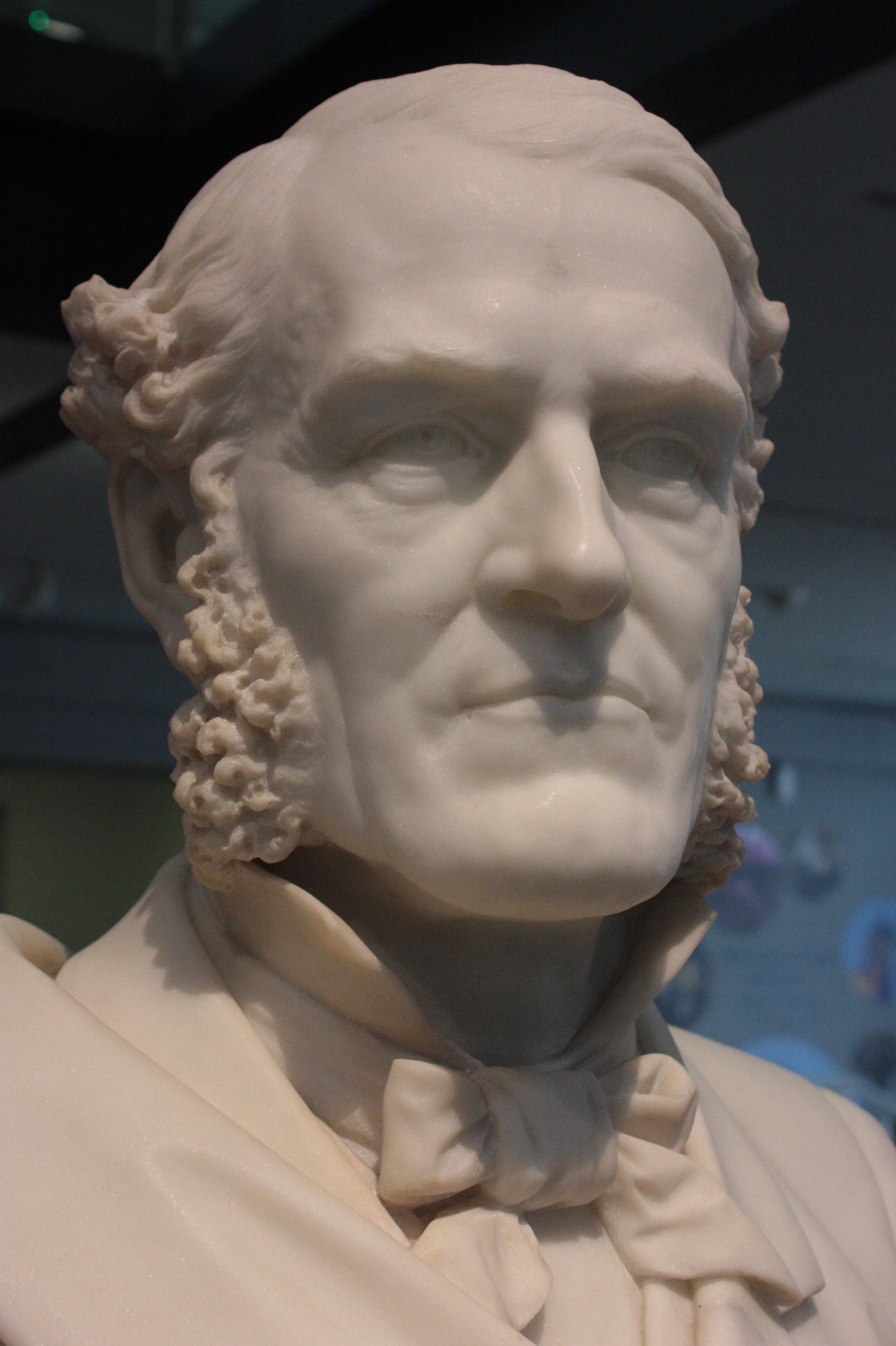
Commodore James Graham Goodenough by Count Gleichen, 1877

Captain James Graham Goodenough CB CMG (3 December 1830 – 20 August 1875) was an officer in the Royal Navy who served as Commander-in-Chief, Australia Station.

== Early life and family ==
He was born at Stoke Hill near Guildford in Surrey, the son of Edmund Goodenough, Dean of Wells Cathedral, and Frances Cockerell. His paternal grandfather was Samuel Goodenough, Bishop of Carlisle, and his godfather was Sir James Graham, after whom he was named. He was educated at Westminster School.

In 1864 he married Victoria Hamilton; they had two sons, including Admiral Sir William Edmund Goodenough.

== Naval career ==
At 14 years of age Goodenough joined the Royal Navy. He firstly (1844–1848) served on HMS Collingwood under Captain Robert Smart in the Pacific fleet of Admiral Sir George Francis Seymour. He then joined HMS Cyclops off coast of Africa, before returning to England late in 1849 to sit his lieutenant's exam.

He went on to serve in the Second Opium War being present at the capture of Canton in 1857. Promoted to captain in 1863, he was given command of HMS Victoria and then HMS Minotaur. He served as Commander-in-Chief, Australia Station, from 1873.

He died of tetanus aboard HMS Pearl off the coast of Australia, resulting from wounds inflicted from poisoned arrows in an attack by natives of the Santa Cruz Islands. He is buried in St Thomas's Church in North Sydney. Some sources state his burial location at St Leonard’s Cemetery in north Sydney.

== Memorials ==
A stained glass window, Adoration of the Lamb, in St Thomas's Church in North Sydney, is dedicated in his memory and a bust, sculptured by Count Gleichen, was placed in the Painted Hall of Greenwich Hospital. A memorial was also constructed in North Sydney (St Thomas's Church?).

The church of the Holy Cross, Cromer Street, King's Cross, London was built in his memory in 1888. The church bell is the ship's bell from HMS Pearl, his flagship

== See also ==
- Goodenough Bay

Military offices
Preceded by Frederick Stirling	Commander-in-Chief, Australia Station; 1873–1875	Succeeded by Anthony Hoskins
