= Simon Lowth =

English nonjuring clergyman

Simon Lowth (1636–1720) was an English nonjuring clergyman, nominated by James II as Dean of Rochester, and later a controversialist on the position of bishops.

== Life ==
He studied at Clare Hall, Cambridge, where he matriculated 1653. He graduated B.A.in 1657 and M.A. in 1660. He was appointed rector of St. Michael, Harbledown, in 1670, and vicar of St. Cosmus and Damian on the Blean, two parishes near Canterbury, in 1679. James II nominated him on 12 November 1688 as Dean of Rochester, in succession to John Castilion. He was instituted by Bishop Thomas Sprat, but his installation was put off when it was discovered that he had taken no higher degree than M.A., and the statutes required that he should be at least B.D. Although he took the degree of D.D, 18 January 1689, he was not installed, and William III shortly afterwards appointed Henry Ullock in his place.

Lowth declined the oath of allegiance to William, and was in consequence suspended from his functions in August 1689, and in the following February deprived of both his livings; he made a fraudulent agreement with his successor in the vicarage. He probably lived the rest of his life in London, and died there 3 July 1720, aged nearly 90, He was buried in the new cemetery, St. George's parish, Queen's Square.

== Works ==
Lowth's works are in defence of an episcopal succession against any right of deposition by a civil magistrate, and in favour of the nonjuring schism. Their titles are:

- 'Of the Subject of Church Power, in whom it resides, its Force, Extent, and Execution,' London, 1685, containing letters addressed to Edward Stillingfleet and John Tillotson, charging them with Erastianism. Tillotson took no notice. Stillingfleet's reply drew the next in response.
- 'A Letter to E, Stillingfleet, in answer to the Epistle Dedicatorie before his Sermon preached at a Public Ordination in the Church of St. Peter, Cornhill, on March 1684-5, together with some Reflexions upon certain Letters which Dr. Burnet wrote on the same occasion,' London, 1687, 4to. In the latter part Lowth charged Gilbert Burnet with falsifications in his 'History of the Reformation.' Burnet replied in a 'Letter,' in answer to which Lowth wrote another work.
- 'A Letter to Dr. Burnet' (no date); to this Burnet published two replies.
- 'A Letter to a Friend, in answer to a Letter written against Mr. S. Lowth in defence of Dr. Stillingfleet,' London, 1688.
- 'Five Letters concerning the Inspiration of the Holy Scriptures,' 1690.
- 'Historical Collections concerning Church Affairs, in which it is shewed, . . that the right to dispose of Bishops was believed to be subjected in the clergy alone,' &c., London, 1696.
- 'Ἐκλογαί, or Excerpts from the Ecclesiastical History, in which some Account is given of the Donatists . . . Novatians . . . and Arians,' London, 1704.

== Family ==
His father is identified in the Dictionary of National Biography as probably Simon Lowth (d. 1679), a royalist clergyman with whom he has sometimes been confused.
