= James Yorke (bishop) =

British bishop

The Right Reverend and Honourable James Yorke
- Bishop of Ely
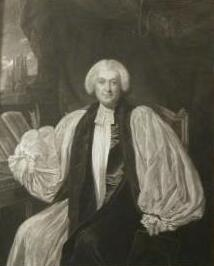
- Diocese: Diocese of Ely
- In office: 1781–1808
- Predecessor: Edmund Keene
- Successor: Thomas Dampier
- Other posts: Dean of Lincoln (1762–1781); Bishop of St David's (1774–1779); Bishop of Gloucester (1779–1781)

Personal details
- Born: 9 March 1730
- Died: 26 August 1808 (aged 78)
- Buried: Forthampton, Gloucestershire
- Denomination: Anglican
- Parents: Philip Yorke, 1st Earl of Hardwicke; Margaret Cocks
- Spouse: Mary Maddox (m. 1762)
- Education: Newcome's School
- Alma mater: Corpus Christi College, Cambridge

James Yorke (9 March 1730 – 26 August 1808) was a British clergyman.

Yorke was the son of Philip Yorke, 1st Earl of Hardwicke, and Margaret Cocks.

He was educated at Newcome's School, proceeding in 1748 to Corpus Christi College, Cambridge (M.A. 1752, D.D. 1770).

== Career ==
Yorke served as Rector of Great Horkesley, Essex, 1754–1756.

In 1756 he was appointed Canon of the tenth stall at St George's Chapel, Windsor Castle, a position he held until 1762.

He was Dean of Lincoln 1762–1781, Bishop of St David's from 1774 to 1779, Bishop of Gloucester from 1779 to 1781 and then Bishop of Ely from 1781 to 1808.

In 1793 he sought statutory powers to sell the bishop's palace and grounds in Wisbech. The Bill passed despite the opposition of Sir James Ayre and the premises were sold by auction in the same year to Joseph Medworth. Eyre was son-in-law of Henry Southwell of Bank House, Wisbech, Isle of Ely a member of the family tenanting the castle, and to that extent an interested party.

== Family ==
On 29 June 1762, Yorke married Mary Maddox, daughter of Isaac Maddox, the Bishop of Worcester. They had several children, including:

- Joseph Yorke (1765–1830), married Catherine Cocks, niece of Charles Cocks, 1st Baron Somers, and became father of Joseph Yorke, politician
- Rev. Philip Yorke (1770–1817), married Hon. Anna Maria Cocks, daughter of the 1st Baron Somers, and became father of Philip James Yorke, soldier and scientist

He was buried at Forthampton, Gloucestershire. His memorial is designed by Robert Blore of Piccadilly.

Church of England titles
Preceded by John Green	Dean of Lincoln; 1762–1781	Succeeded by Richard Cust
Preceded by Charles Moss	Bishop of St David's; 1774–1779	Succeeded by John Warren
Preceded by William Warburton	Bishop of Gloucester; 1779–1781	Succeeded by Samuel Halifax
Preceded by Edmund Keene	Bishop of Ely; 1781–1808	Succeeded by Thomas Dampier
