= Basil Wynne Willson =

English Anglican bishop (1868–1946)

- Bishop of Bath and Wells
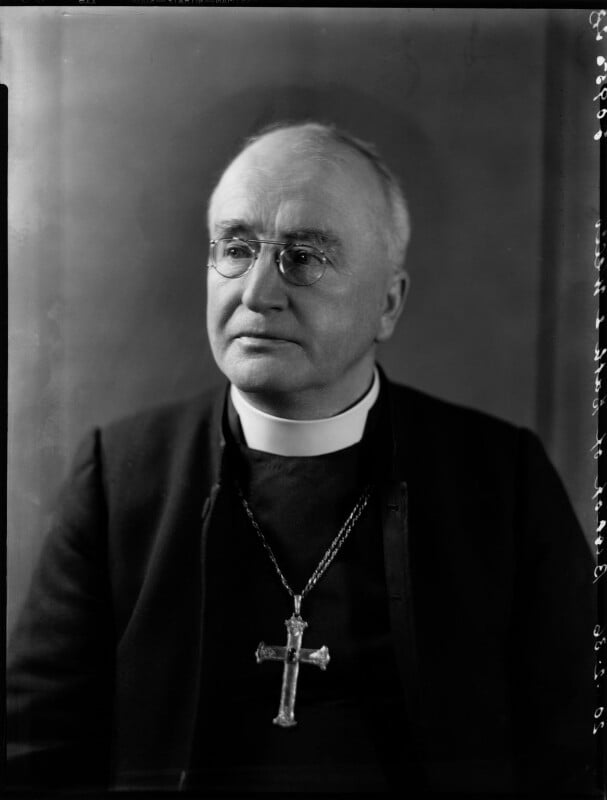
- Willson in 1936
- Diocese: Diocese of Bath and Wells
- In office: 1921 – 1937 (ret.)
- Predecessor: George Kennion
- Successor: Francis Underhill
- Other post: Dean of Bristol (1916–1921)

Orders
- Ordination: 1904
- Consecration: 1 November 1921 by Randall Davidson

Personal details
- Born: 28 August 1868
- Died: 15 October 1946 (aged 78)
- Denomination: Anglican
- Parents: W. Wynne Willson (priest)
- Spouse: Lilian Wills
- Education: St John's College, Cambridge

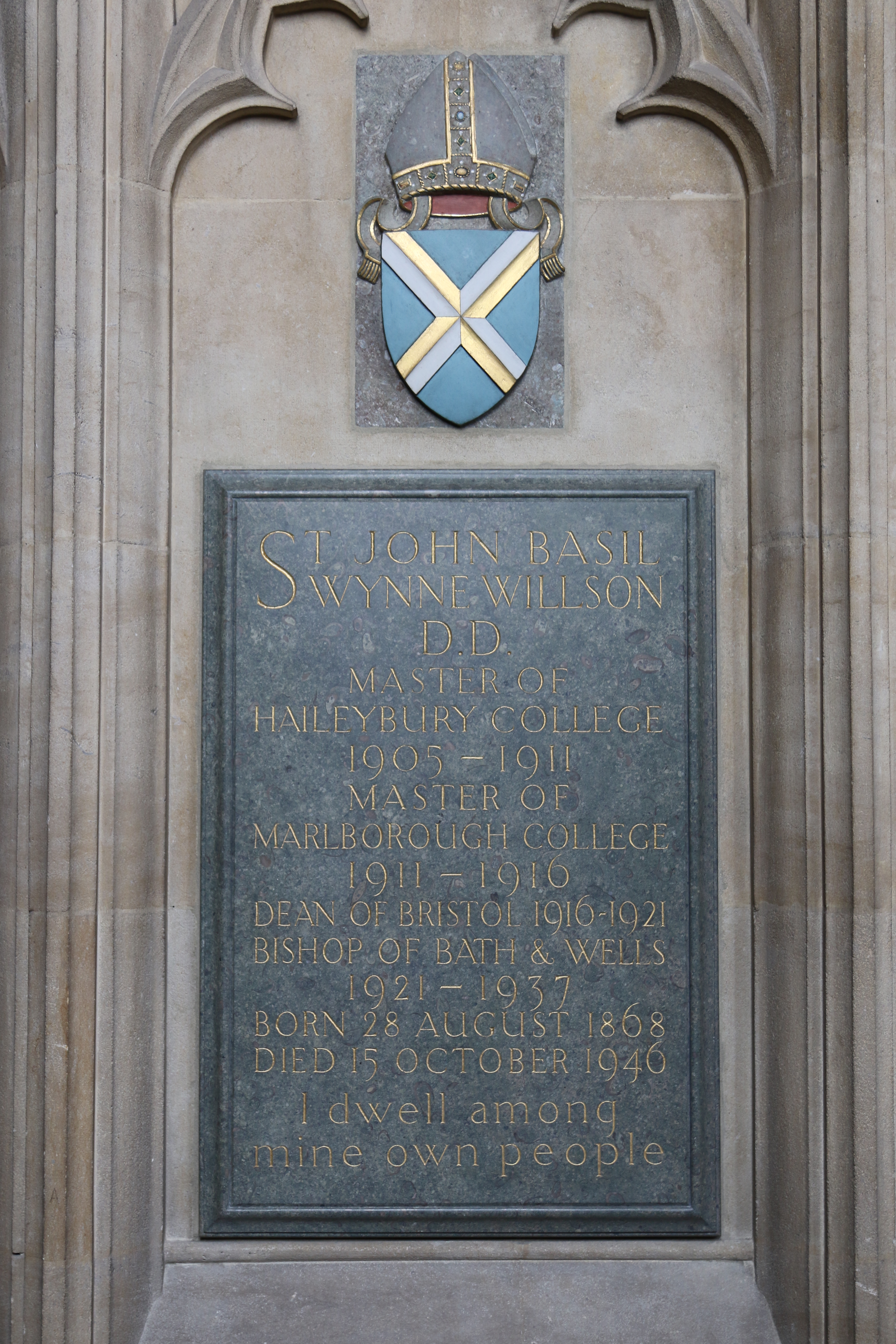
Memorial in Wells Cathedral

St John Basil Wynne Willson (28 August 1868 – 15 October 1946) was an Anglican bishop in the first half of the 20th century. He was the Bishop of Bath and Wells from 1921 to 1937.

Willson was educated at Cheltenham and St John's College, Cambridge. He was an Assistant Master at The Leys School and Rugby before Headships at Haileybury College and Marlborough. Ordained in 1904, he was appointed Dean of Bristol in 1916, a post he held for five years. The Bishop of Bristol (George Nickson) and the Dean were strong supporters of Britain's involvement in the Great War and Willson, although 48, volunteered for the Army Chaplaincy. He was interviewed on 7 February 1917, and he asked to be posted to France or Salonika; but bouts of colon pain and shortsightedness meant that he had to serve in England. He left the army in 1918. He married Alice Lillian Wills in 1919, and died in 1946. He was consecrated a bishop on All Saints' Day 1921 (1 November) by Randall Davidson, Archbishop of Canterbury, at St Paul's Cathedral. He then served as Bishop of Bath and Wells until his retirement on 1 November 1937.

== Publications ==
A classical scholar, Willson's translations included Aeschylus' Prometheus Bound; Julius Caesar's Gallic Wars, books 4 and 5; Virgil's Aeneid, books 5 and 6; and Lucian of Samosata's Wonderland (Vera Historia).

Church of England titles
Preceded by Francis Pigou	Dean of Bristol; 1916–1921	Succeeded by Edward Burroughs
Preceded by George Kennion	Bishop of Bath and Wells; 1921–1937	Succeeded by Francis Underhill
