= Edmund Goodenough =

English churchman

Edmund Goodenough (1786–1845) was an English churchman, dean of Wells from 1831.

== Life ==
Goodenough was the youngest son of Samuel Goodenough, bishop of Carlisle, by his wife, Elizabeth, eldest daughter of Dr. James Ford, physician extraordinary to Queen Charlotte, was born at Baling, Middlesex, on 3 April 1785. At an early age he was sent to Westminster School, where in 1797, when only twelve years old, he was elected into college. In 1801 he obtained his election to Christ Church, Oxford, where he took honours in Easter term 1804, and graduated B.A. 1805, M.A. 1807, B.D. 1819, and D.D. 1820.

Having taken orders, Goodenough became tutor and censor of Christ Church, and in 1810 was appointed curate of Cowley, Oxford. In 1811 he was chosen by the university as one of the mathematical examiners, and in 1816 filled the office of proctor. In Michaelmas term 1817 he was appointed select preacher to the university, and in the following year was instituted vicar of Warkworth, Northumberland.

In 1819 Goodenough was appointed headmaster of Westminster School and subalmoner to the king, in succession to William Page. On 23 June 1824 he was made a prebendary of York, on 22 April 1826 a prebendary of Carlisle, and on 1 June 1827 a prebendary of Westminster. In 1828 he retired from the headmastership, and was succeeded by Richard Williamson. Towards the end of Goodenough's rule the numbers of the school had steadily declined. He was elected a Fellow of the Royal Society in 1824; he was chosen for its council in 1828.

On 6 September 1831 he was nominated dean of Wells, in the place of the Hon. Henry Ryder, bishop of Lichfield, who succeeded to Goodenough's stall at Westminster. Goodenough was prolocutor of the lower house of convocation for a short time. He died suddenly at Wells, while walking in the fields near his house, on 2 May 1845, aged 59, and was buried in the Lady Chapel of Wells Cathedral, where there is a brass to his memory.

== Works ==
He published the following sermons:

- 'A Sermon [on 1 Cor. xiv. 33] preached at ... Lambeth [12 Nov. 1820], at the Consecration of ... W. Carey, ... Bishop of Exeter,' London, 1821.
- 'A Sermon [on Deut. xxxiii. 9] preached ... [13 May 1830] at the Festival of the Sons of the Clergy,' &c., London, 1830.

3. 'A Sermon [on Luke xii. 47 and part of 48] preached in the Abbey Church, Bath [24 Jan. 1832] at the Anniversary Meeting of the Bath Diocesan Association of the Society for the Propagation of the Gospel,' &c., London, 1832.

== Family ==
He married, on 31 May 1821, Frances, daughter of Samuel Pepys Cockerell of Westbourne House, Paddington, by whom he had the sons James Graham Goodenough and William Howley Goodenough besides many other children. His widow died of cholera at Málaga on 5 August 1855, and was buried there.

Church of England titles
Preceded by Henry Ryder	Dean of Wells; 1831–1845	Succeeded by Richard Jenkyns
