= Philip Hesketh =

British Anglican priest

The Very Reverend Dr Philip Hesketh DL
- Dean of Rochester
- Church: Church of England
- Diocese: Rochester
- In office: June 2016 to present
- Predecessor: Mark Beach

Orders
- Ordination: 1994 (deacon); 1995 (priest)

Personal details
- Born: Philip John Hesketh; 15 November 1964 (age 61) Southport, Lancashire, England
- Denomination: Anglicanism
- Spouse: Sugina Kamalagharan (m. 1989)
- Children: 4
- Education: St Ninian's High School, Douglas
- Alma mater: King's College London; Ripon College Cuddesdon

Philip John Hesketh DL (born 15 November 1964) is an Anglican clergyman.

Since June 2016, Dr Hesketh serves as the Dean of Rochester, head of the Chapter of Rochester Cathedral and the most senior priest in the Diocese of Rochester.

== Early life and education ==
Born in 1964 at Southport, Lancashire, the son of Ronald Hesketh, a kinsman of the Hesketh-Fleetwood baronets, and Jacquline née Matthew, he was brought up on the Isle of Man, and educated at St Ninian's High School, Douglas. In 1983, he moved to London and matriculated into King's College London to study divinity. He graduated in 1986 with a Bachelor of Divinity (BD) degree and the Associateship of King's College (AKC) qualification. In 1992, he entered Ripon College Cuddesdon, an Anglican theological college, to train for ordained ministry. During this time he also undertook postgraduate research at KCL, taking a doctorate of Philosophy (PhD, Londin) in 1984.

== Ordained ministry ==
Hesketh was ordained in the Church of England as a deacon in 1994 then priest in 1995. From 1994 to 1998, he served his curacy at Holy Cross Church, Bearsted, in the diocese of Canterbury. Then, from 1998 to 2005, he was Vicar of St Stephen's Church, Chatham, in the Diocese of Rochester.

In 2005, Hesketh was appointed a Canon Residentiary of Rochester Cathedral. When Dr Mark Beach resigned as Dean in January 2015, Hesketh was appointed Acting-Dean. On 26 February 2016, it was announced that he would be the next Dean of Rochester. He was installed as Dean at Rochester Cathedral during a service on 19 June 2016.

== Personal life ==
In 1989, Hesketh is married Sugina Kamalagharan, a medical doctor; together they have four children.

== Honours ==
Hesketh was appointed a Deputy Lieutenant for Kent in 2019, and was awarded an honorary doctorate by Canterbury Christ Church University in 2023.

== Styles ==
- The Reverend Dr Philip Hesketh (1994–2005)
- The Reverend Canon Dr Philip Hesketh (2005–2016)
- The Very Reverend Dr Philip Hesketh (2016–2019)
- The Very Reverend Dr Philip Hesketh DL (2019–)

== See also ==
- Rochester Cathedral
