= John Storrs (priest) =

Anglican priest (1846–1928)

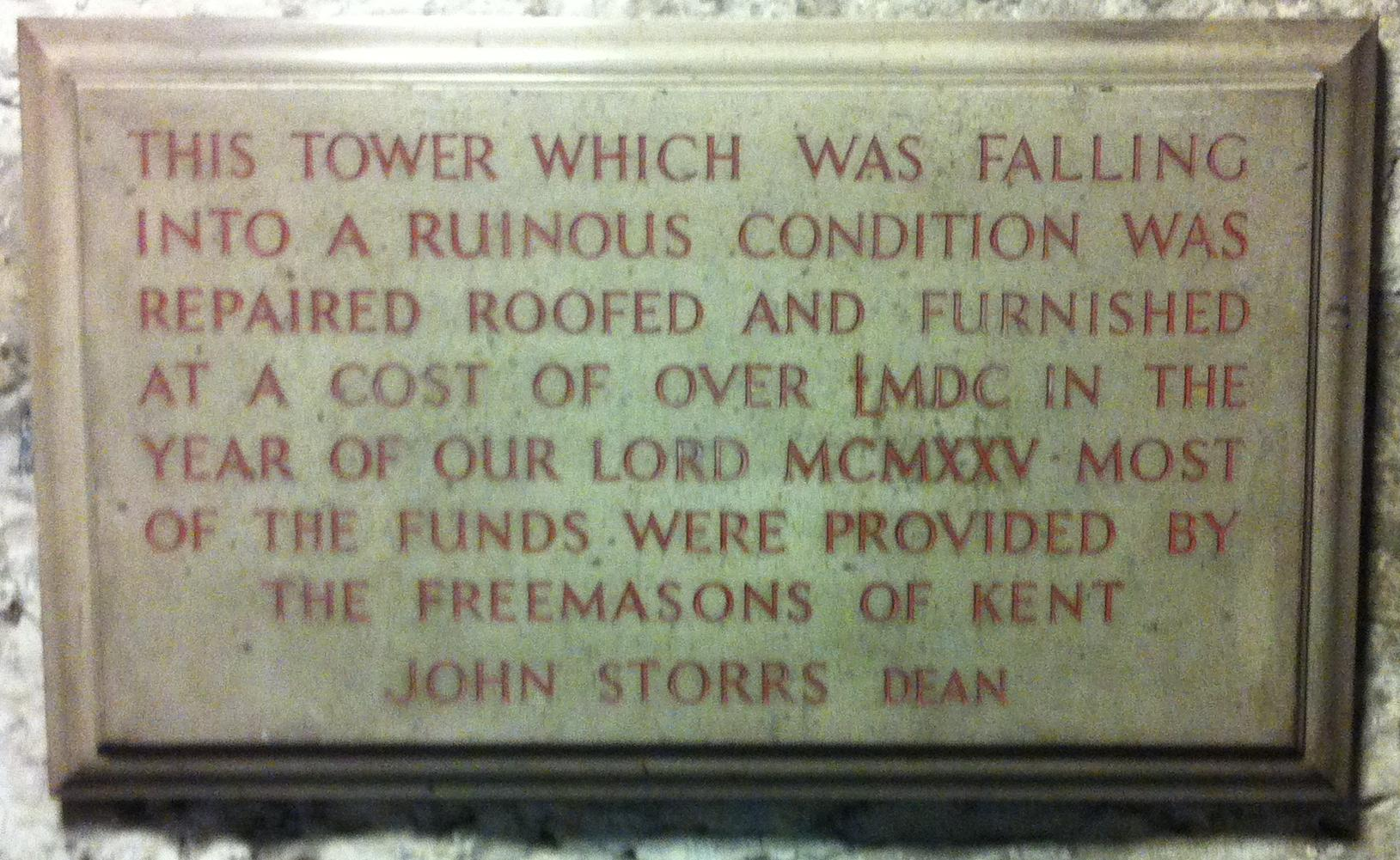
Plaque recording the restoration of the Gundulf Tower

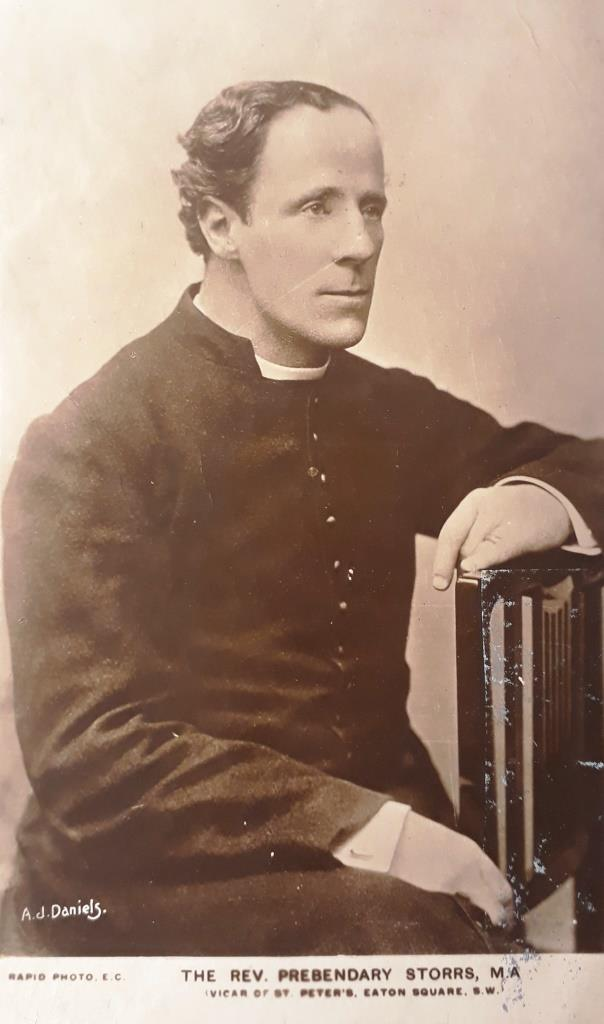
The Rev Prebendary John Storrs MA Vicar of St Peter's Eaton Square

John Storrs (1846 - 29 February 1928) was an Anglican priest at the end of the 19th century and the first decades of the 20th century.

Storrs was born in the colony of Nova Scotia, the eldest son of the Rev. John Storrs of Wolfville, Nova Scotia. He was educated in England at The King's School, Rochester, matriculating in 1865 and going up to Pembroke College, Cambridge. He obtained his BA in 1869, his MA in 1873 and received a DD in 1913.

Storrs was ordained deacon in 1871 and a priest in 1873. He was a curate at St Mary's Bury St Edmunds. and then at St Peter's, Eaton Square, London. From 1880 he was the vicar of St James' (now St Edmundsbury Cathedral), Bury St Edmunds and, from 1883, at St Peter's, Eaton Square before becoming the Dean of Rochester in 1913. Whilst at St Peter's he served as the rural dean (Note: Even at this date the term "rural dean" was archaic and has now been replaced by "area dean") from 1891 to 1902, then was the Rural Dean of Westminster from 1902 until his move to Rochester. In 1912 and 1913 he was an honorary chaplain to King George V.

Storrs was responsible for various projects in Rochester Cathedral, notably the recasting of the bells in 1921 and the restoration of the Gundulf Tower (see illustration).

I was recast in memory of
Francis Edmund Storrs, R. N. V. R.,
son of the Dean,
died 10 November 1918,
eve of the Armistice.
κτεπόθη ό θάνατοΣ ΕιΣ ΝικοΣ

— I Corinthians 15:54 "Death is swallowed up in victory"

Storrs married Lucy Anna Maria Cockayne-Cust in 1881 and had six children:

- Sir Ronald Henry Amherst Storrs (1881–1955), an official in the Foreign and Colonial Office
- Francis Edmund Storrs (1882–1918), a naval officer
- Bernard St. John Storrs (1884–1967), an army officer
- Monica Melanie Storrs (1888-1967), a missionary in the Peace River area of Canada
- Rt. Rev. Christopher Evelyn Storrs (1889–1978), an Anglican bishop
- Lucy Petronella Noel Storrs (1896–1978), who married Frewen Moor

Francis was in the Royal Navy Volunteer Reserve and died the day before the First World War ended. His father received the telegram whilst on the way to the cathedral to preach at the service of thanksgiving. In Francis's memory the tenor bell (Note: The tenor is the largest, heaviest and deepest sounding bell in a ring of bells) at Rochester Cathedral bears the inscription shown on the right.

There is an oak screen memorial to Storrs in Rochester Cathedral.

Church of England titles
Preceded by Ernald Lane	Dean of Rochester; 1913–1928	Succeeded by Reginald Thomas Talbot
