= Samuel Pratt (priest) =

English cleric (died 1723)

Samuel Pratt (died 14 November 1723) was a Canon of Windsor from 1697 to 1723 and Dean of Rochester from 1706 to 1723.

== Career ==
He was educated at Merchant Taylors' School and St Catharine's College, Cambridge and graduated D.D. (per lit. reg.) in 1697.

He was appointed:

- Head Master of Wye Grammar School, Kent
- Chaplain to the Princess of Denmark
- Rector of Kenardington, Kent 1682 - 1693
- Vicar of Islington, 1690
- Vicar of All Hallows' Church, Tottenham 1693 - 1707
- Curate of St Mary le Strand 1697 (the congregation then used the Savoy Chapel)
- Chief domestic Chaplain to Queen Anne
- Sub-preceptor to Prince William, Duke of Gloucester
- Dean of Rochester 1706 - 1723
- Clerk of the Closet 1706 - 1714
- Vicar of Goudhurst, Kent 1700 - 1713
- Vicar of Twickenham 1712 - 1723

He was appointed to the fourth stall in St George's Chapel, Windsor Castle in 1697, and held the stall until 1723.
