= Ernald Lane =

Ernald Lane (3 March 1836 - 16 January 1913) was an Anglican priest in the late 19th century and the early part of the 20th.

He was born the son of John Newton Lane of King's Bromley, Staffordshire and educated at Balliol College, Oxford. Through his father, he was a descendant of the Lane family of Bentley, West Midlands, one of whom was Jane Lane, Lady Fisher, a heroine of the English Civil War. A fine rower who represented Oxford in the 1858 Boat Race he was ordained in 1862 and was a curate at Baldersby, Rector of Leigh, Staffordshire and then a prebendary of Lichfield Cathedral until 1888 when he became Archdeacon of Stoke.

A noted scholar, he was the Dean of Rochester from 1904 until 1913, where there is a memorial to him.

He married in 1879 Evelyn, the daughter of J. W. Philips of Heybridge, Staffordshire.

He is remembered on the number 8 bell at Rochester: vidua et socii / me refecerunt. / In memorianm / Ernaldi Lane D.D. / hujusce ædis decani. / Obiit 16th Jan., 1913. / Adeste Fideles. (Note: The widow and colleagues remade me in memory of Ernald Lane DD Deacon of this house of God. Died 16th January 1913. O Come all ye faithful)

== Notes ==
Church of England titles
Preceded by Samuel Reynolds Hole	Dean of Rochester; 1904 –1913	Succeeded by John Storrs
