= Henry Vassall Webster =

British Army officer

Sir Henry Vassall Webster KTS
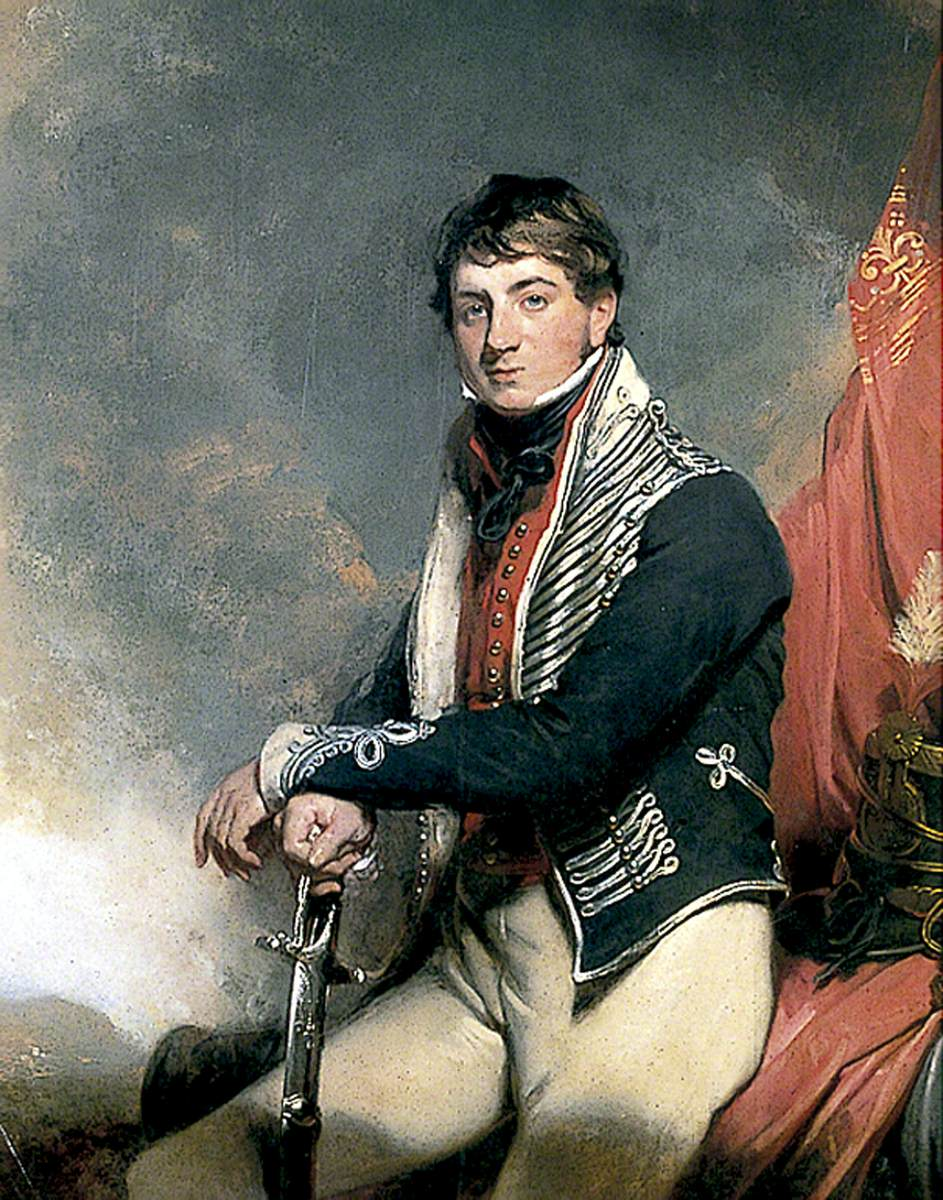
- Born: February 1793; Naples
- Died: 19 April 1847 (aged 54); Upper Brook Street, London
- Burial place: Kensal Green Cemetery
- Relatives: Sir Godfrey Webster, 4th Baronet (father); Elizabeth Fox, Baroness Holland (mother); Samuel Boddington (father-in-law)
- Military career
- Allegiance: United Kingdom
- Branch: British Army
- Service years: 1810–1826
- Rank: Lieutenant-colonel
- Unit: 9th Light Dragoons
- Conflicts: Napoleonic Wars; Peninsular War; Battle of Vitoria; Hundred Days; Battle of Waterloo
- Awards: Knight of the Military Order of Wilhelm (1815); Knight Commander of the Military Order of the Tower and the Sword (1832); Military Order of Aviz (1835); Knight bachelor (1843); Waterloo Medal

Lieutenant-Colonel Sir Henry Vassall Webster KTS (February 1793 – 19 April 1847) was a British Army officer. He served as an aide-de-camp to the Prince of Orange during the Waterloo campaign, and it was in this capacity that he delivered a message to the Duke of Wellington at the Duchess of Richmond's ball informing the Duke that the French were advancing upon Brussels.

He was the second son of Sir Godfrey Webster, 4th Baronet and his wife Elizabeth Vassall (later Baroness Holland).

He joined the Army in 1810 and rose to lieutenant-colonel in 1831. In 1843, he was knighted.

Webster married Grace (d. 27 March 1866), the only daughter and heir of Samuel Boddington, on 23 October 1824.

He died on 19 April 1847 from self-inflicted knife wounds. He is buried at Kensal Green Cemetery.

His portrait was painted by Martin Archer Shee.
