= Mark Beach =

British priest

The Revd Mark Beach BA MA DMin
- Dean of Rochester
- Church: Church of England
- Diocese: Rochester
- In office: 2012–2015
- Predecessor: Adrian Newman
- Successor: Philip Hesketh

Personal details
- Born: 1962 (age 63–64)
- Denomination: Anglican
- Spouse: Annabel
- Children: 1 daughter

Mark Howard Francis Beach (born 1962) is a priest of the Church of England. He was the Dean of Rochester Cathedral from 2012 to January 2015 when he became the director of Blackfriars Settlement.

== Early life and education ==
Beach grew up in Staffordshire. Following school at Ellesmere College, he studied theology at the University of Kent for his BA degree in 1980 and completed an MA degree in mission and ministry studies at the University of Nottingham in 1995. At King's College London he completed a University of London doctorate in ministry (DMin) in 2011. Beach came out to his father as gay when he was 17 but was told "no son of mine is gay" so he went on to marry a woman.

== Ordained ministry ==
Beach trained for ordained ministry at St Stephen's House from 1985 to 1987. His curacy was at St John the Baptist, Beeston. He then served a second curacy at Hucknall Torkard in the Diocese of Southwell and Nottingham. He then moved to the parish of Gedling, a few miles away in the same diocese, as rector from 1993 to 2001. He was the bishop's chaplain in the Diocese of Wakefield from 2001 to 2003 before going to Rugby, Warwickshire, as a team rector. He left Rugby in 2012 to take up the appointment of Dean of Rochester. In January 2015 it was announced that he had resigned from this position because of issues regarding his marriage break-up.

== Post resignation ==
In late January the Bishop of Rochester announced that "Beach is taking on a new role outside ordained ministry, and has been appointed to the post of director of the Blackfriars Settlement." In October 2018, he appeared on the Channel 4 programme First Dates Hotel. He revealed on the show that his marriage broke down after he came out to his wife and daughter.

== Styles ==
- Mr Mark Beach (until 1987)
- The Revd Mark Beach (1987–2012; 2015–present)
- The Very Revd Mark Beach (2012–2015)
