= Benjamin Newcombe =

Anglican priest

Benjamin Newcombe was an Anglican priest in the late 18th century.

Newcom(b)e was educated at Queens' College, Cambridge. He held livings at Tolleshunt Knights, Siddington, Lamberhurst, Putney and St Mildred, Poultry with St Mary Colechurch (in the City of London). He was Dean of Rochester from 1767 until his death on 22 July 1775.

On 29 January 1756, he married Augustus Henry FitzRoy, 3rd Duke of Grafton and The Hon. Anne Liddell, daughter of Henry Liddell, 1st Baron Ravensworth (1708–1784), at Lord Ravensworth's house in St James's Square, by special licence of the Archbishop of Canterbury. The marriage was witnessed by Lord Ravensworth and Francis Seymour-Conway, 1st Earl of Hertford.

Church of England titles
Preceded by William Markham	Dean of Rochester; 1767 –1785	Succeeded by Thomas Thurlow
