= Walter Burrell (1777–1831) =

English politician

Walter Burrell (15 April 1777 – 7 April 1831) was an English Tory politician who sat in the House of Commons from 1812 to 1831.

== Biography ==
He was the third son of William Burrell, and Sophia Burrell, of Deepdene, Dorking, Surrey. Burrell was educated at Westminster School where he may have taken part in the first school cricket match in 1794 between Westminster and Charterhouse School. In 1821, Burrell joined his sisters, Juliana Crutchley of Sunninghill Park, Elizabeth Kenah and her husband Colonel Thomas Kenah, and a Blenheim spaniel on a tour of the European continent.

=== Marriage ===
He married Helen Anne Chisholm (1790-1874), daughter of a Canadian Merchant, Alexander Ellice, on 21 July 1825 at St. George Hanover Square, London, England.

== Political career ==
Burrell was elected at the 1812 general election as Member of Parliament (MP) for Sussex. He was re-elected three times, and held the seat until his death shortly before the 1831 general election.

Parliament of the United Kingdom
Preceded by Charles William Wyndham; John 'Mad Jack' Fuller	Member of Parliament for Sussex; 1812 – 1831; With: Sir Godfrey Webster, Bt 1812–20; Edward Jeremiah Curteis 1820–30; Herbert Barrett Curteis 1830–32	Succeeded by Lord John Lennox; Herbert Barrett Curteis
