= Francis Underhill =

English bishop (1878–1943)

- Bishop of Bath and Wells
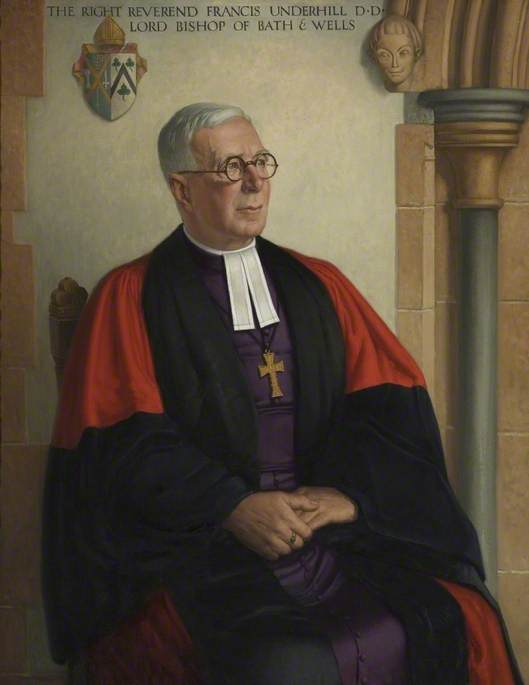
- Underhill by Harry Morley; oil on canvas, 1940
- Diocese: Diocese of Bath and Wells
- In office: 1937–1943
- Predecessor: Basil Wynne Willson
- Successor: William Wand
- Other post: Dean of Rochester (1932–1937)

Orders
- Consecration: 30 November 1937 by Cosmo Lang

Personal details
- Born: 16 May 1878
- Died: 24 January 1943 (aged 64)
- Denomination: Anglican
- Education: Shrewsbury School
- Alma mater: Exeter College, Oxford

Francis Underhill (16 May 1878 – 24 January 1943) was an Anglican bishop in the first half of the 20th century.

Underhill was educated at Shrewsbury School and Exeter College, Oxford. He was ordained in 1901 and was a curate at St Paul's Swindon and St Thomas the Martyr, Oxford and then Vicar of St Alban the Martyr, Birmingham until 1925. He was the first secretary of the Federation of Catholic Priests and from 1925 until 1932 he was Warden of Liddon House, and priest in charge of the Grosvenor Chapel, Mayfair when he was appointed Dean of Rochester, a position he held until his confirmation as Bishop of Bath and Wells in 1937. Shortly after confirmation, he was consecrated a bishop on St Andrew's Day 1937 (30 November), by Cosmo Lang, Archbishop of Canterbury, at St Paul's Cathedral. An author, he was a cousin of Evelyn Underhill.

Church of England titles
Preceded by Reginald Talbot	Dean of Rochester; 1932–1937	Succeeded by Ernest Blackie
Preceded by Basil Wynne Willson	Bishop of Bath and Wells; 1937–1943	Succeeded by William Wand
