= George Kennion =

English bishop (1845–1922)

- Bishop of Bath and Wells
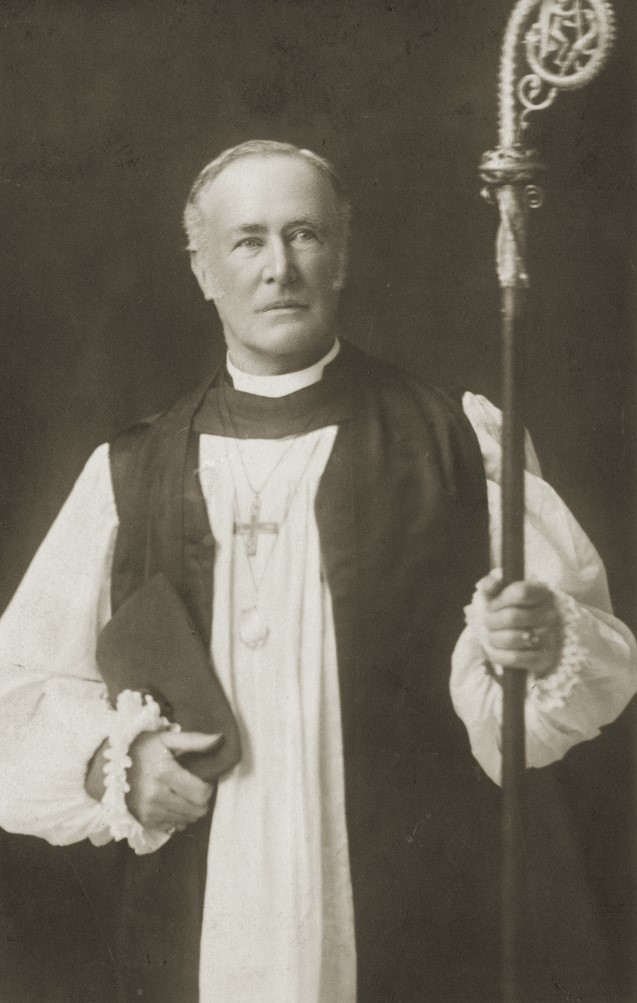
- Kennion, c. 1919
- Diocese: Diocese of Bath and Wells
- In office: 1894 – 1919 (ret.)
- Predecessor: Arthur Hervey
- Successor: Basil Wynne Willson
- Previous post: Bishop of Adelaide (1882–1894)

Orders
- Ordination: 1869 (deacon); 1870 (priest)
- Consecration: 1882 by John Jackson (London)

Personal details
- Born: 5 September 1845 Harrogate, West Riding of Yorkshire, UK
- Died: 19 May 1922 (aged 76) Ayr, Ayrshire, UK
- Denomination: Anglican
- Education: Oriel College, Oxford

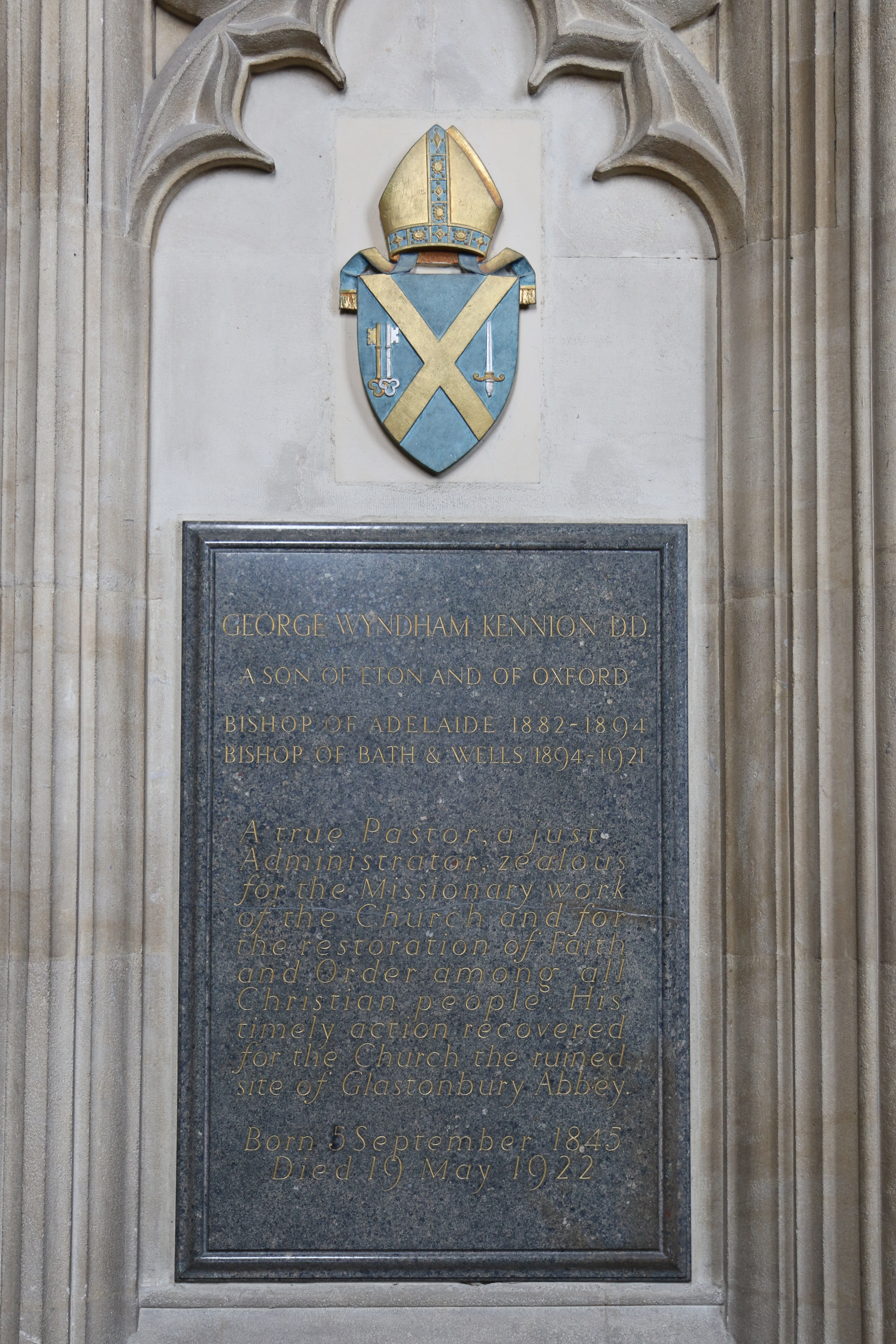
Memorial in Wells Cathedral

George Wyndham Kennion, DD (5 September 1845 – 19 May 1922) was the Anglican Bishop of Adelaide, and later Bishop of Bath and Wells.

== Birth and education ==
George Wyndham Kennion was born at Harrogate, England, on 5 September 1845 to George Kennion and Catherine, daughter of J. F. Fordyce.

== Bishop of Bath and Wells ==
In 1894 Archibald Primrose, 5th Earl of Rosebery called him to the bishopric of Bath and Wells. He was translated (legally taking up his new See) by the confirmation of his election on 17 October 1894 at St Mary-le-Bow.

He was lecturer in pastoral theology at Cambridge University in 1899 and Ramsden preacher in 1901. In June 1901, he received an honorary doctorate in Divinity from the University of Glasgow.

During the First World War, Kennion was not among the leading bishops preaching condemnation of Germany. He tended to encourage practical initiatives in his diocese, supporting recruitment of clergy to the Chaplaincies, naming clerical families and describing their activities in the War including recognition of individual gallantry awards, and promoting women volunteers to work in agriculture. He pressed his clergy to support wounded soldiers and sailors, using a 200-year-old adage.

God and soldiers men adore
In time of war, but not before:
When peace returns, and things are righted,
God is forgot, and soldiers slighted.

"Let it not happen here", Kennion added, but in the 1920s and 1930s it did happen.

== Death ==
Kennion resigned in 1919 due to illness and died at Ayr on 19 May 1922.

== Private life ==
Kennion was a Freemason, under the jurisdiction of the United Grand Lodge of England (UGLE). Although he never served in the prestigious role of Grand Chaplain of UGLE, in 1897 he was granted the honorific rank of Past Grand Chaplain in recognition of his services to English Freemasonry, as part of a series of similar honorary promotions intended to mark the diamond jubilee of Queen Victoria.

Kennion was also noted as a cyclist. His obituary in the Church Times mentioned, "In later years he was accredited with having been the first English bishop to become a cyclist."

== Publications ==
- Kenyon, George (1853). Observations On The Medicinal Springs Of Harrogate. London: J & A Churchill. ISBN 978-1169576902. (The first edition was 1853. The ISBN refers to a 21st-century reprint)

== Sources ==
- Serle, Percival (1949). "Kennion, George Wyndham". Dictionary of Australian Biography. Sydney: Angus & Robertson.

Anglican Communion titles
| Preceded by Augustus Short | Bishop of Adelaide; 1882–1894 | Succeeded by John Harmer |
| Preceded by Lord Arthur Hervey | Bishop of Bath and Wells; 1894 –1921 | Succeeded by Basil Wynne Willson |
