= Sir Godfrey Webster (1799 ship) =

History

Great Britain
- Name: Sir Godfrey Webster
- Namesake: Godfrey Webster
- Owner: 1799:Plumber & Co.; 1807:Taylor & Co.; 1811:John Channon Lee; 1815:Plummer & Co.; 1822:W. Fellows; 1823:Somes & Co.
- Builder: Perry, Wells & Green, Blackwall
- Launched: 10 August 1799
- Fate: Condemned 1826 as no longer seaworthy; sold for breaking up

General characteristics
- Tons burthen: 518, or 519, or 541, or 548, or 54828/94, (bm)
- Length: Overall:121 ft 6 in (37.0 m); Keel:97 ft 1 1/4 in (29.6 m)
- Beam: 31 ft 8 1/2 in (9.7 m)
- Depth of hold: 18 ft 0 in (5.5 m)
- Propulsion: Sail
- Complement: 1799:22; 1807:35; 1807:35; 1810:35; 1812:50
- Armament: 1799: 8 × 12-pounder guns; 1807: 20 × 18- & 12-pounder guns; 1807: 20 × 18- & 12-pounder guns; 1810: 4 × 12-pounder guns + 16 × 18-pounder carronades; 1812: 4 × 12-pounder guns + 16 × 18-pounder carronades
- Notes: Two decks

Sir Godfrey Webster (henceforth Sir Godfrey) was launched in 1799. She was a West Indiaman until 1812 when she made one voyage for the British East India Company (EIC). On her return she returned to trading with the West Indies. However, she then performed two voyages transporting convicts, the first to Van Diemen's Land, and the second to New South Wales. She ran into difficulties on her way home from Singapore after the second voyage and was condemned at Mauritius.

== Career ==
=== West Indiaman ===
Sir Godfrey first appears in Lloyd's Register in 1799 with Spencer, master, Plumber, owner, and trade London–Jamaica. Captain William Spencer acquired a letter of marque on 1 November. On 9 November 1800 Sir Godfrey was among the vessels caught in a tremendous gale at Deal in which she lost cables and anchors.

On 7 November 1806 Godfrey was sailing from London to Jamaica when she ran ashore on North Sand Head. However, boats from Deal got her off and she had suffered little damage.

On 26 October 1807, Captain John Luxon Bruton acquired a letter of marque. However, on 2 November, Captain Peter Walker acquired one also. Lloyd's Register for 1807 showed Sir Godfrey's master changing from Bruton to Walker. It also showed her owner as Taylor & Co. However, her trade was still London–Jamaica.

Lloyd's Register for 1810 showed Sir Godfrey's master changing from Walker to Dawson. Her owner was still Taylor & Co. and her trade was still London–Jamaica. Captain John Dawson acquired a letter of marque on 21 April 1810.

=== EIC voyage ===
In 1811 the EIC had Sir Godfrey repaired by Mestaer and measured. Captain James Pearson acquired a letter of marque on 10 April 1812. Captain Pearson sailed from Falmouth on 15 May 1812, bound for Bengal. Sir Godfrey reached Madeira on 3 June and arrived at Calcutta on 3 November. Homeward bound, she was at Saugor on 18 January 1813. On 13 March she was at Point de Galle. She was damaged in a storm on 26 April and forced to seek repairs. A series of reports in Lloyd List provided varied information. On 10 August 1813 it reported that Sir Godfrey was one of three vessels that had parted from the fleet to Portsmouth in a storm between 23 and 26 April near Mauritius. Then on 22 October Lloyd's List passed on a report that Sir Godfrey had put into Maruitius. Then on 2 November Lloyd's List reported that Sir Godfrey had put into Mauritius dismasted. Three days later Lloyd's List stated that the report that Sir Godfrey had put into Mauritius was uncertain. Four days after that, on 9 November, Lloyd's List reported that Sir Godfrey had not been heard from since she parted from the fleet at end-April had not been heard of since. Lastly, Lloyd's List reported on 10 December that Sir Godfrey had put into Bombay dismasted and was going into dock at end June for repairs,

Sir Godfrey arrived at Bombay on 5 June. Sir Godfrey was leaving Bombay in October for London when she grounded. She had to return to dock and was expected to remain there for a month to six weeks. She left on 20 December. On 5 January 1814 she was again at Point de Galle. She left with the fleet on 11 January. She reached the Cape of Good Hope on 1 March and St Helena on 25 March. She arrived at The Downs on 2 June.

=== West Indiaman ===
Lloyd's Register for 1814 shows Sir Godfrey's master changing from Dawson to Boyes. Neither Lloyd's Register nor the Register of Shipping appears to have recorded the voyage for the EIC. The 1814 volume of Lloyd's Register still shows her owner as Taylor & Co., and her trade as London–Jamaica. (The Registers were only as accurate as owners chose to make them.) The 1815 issue shows her owner as Plummer & Co., and her trade as London–Jamaica.

On 26 November 1819, Sir Godfrey, Boyes, master, ran onshore on the rocks of Folkestone while sailing from London to Jamaica. Boats got her off and she proceeded to Portsmouth to go into dock.

Lloyd's Register for 1822 showed Sir Godfrey's master changing from Boyes to Telfer, and her owner from Plummer to W. Fellow.

On 12 May 1822 Vine, of Arbroath, Stephen, master, wrecked on the Kentish Knock, in the North Sea off Margate, Kent. Sir Godfrey, Telfer, master, rescued the crew some 18 hours later. Vine was on a voyage from Newcastle upon Tyne, Northumberland to Caen, Calvados, France. Part of the wreck was towed into Whitstable.

=== Convict transport ===
Lloyd's Register for 1823 shows Sir Godfrey as having undergone a large repair in 1823. It also shows her master as Renoldson, her owner as Soames, and her trade as London–New South Wales.

Captain John Rennoldson sailed from London on 1 September 1823 and arrived at Hobart Town on 30 December. She had embarked 180 male convicts, none of whom died on the voyage. Two officers and 33 men of the 40th Regiment of Foot provided the guard.

Captain Rennoldson sailed from Gravesend on 3 June 1825 and arrived at Cork on 16 June. He sailed from Cork on 11 July, stopping at Tenriffe and the Cape of Good Hope on the Way to Sydney. Sir Godfrey arrived at Sydney on 3 January 1826. She had embarked 196 male convicts at Cork, three of whom died on the journey. Two officers and 33 men of the 57th Regiment of Foot provided the guard; they brought with them several wives and children.

== Fate ==
A letter dated Mauritius 22 August 1826 reported that Sir Godfrey had put into Mauritius as she was sailing from Singapore and Penang for London. She was in a shattered condition and it was believed that she would not be able to resume her journey. A second letter dated August 28 reported that Captain Rennoldson had died two days earlier and that Sir Godfrey would be surveyed within the course of the week. On 15 October she was condemned as unseaworthy and sold for breaking up.

Sir Godfrey had undergone minor repairs at Sydney, Singapore, and Penang, and had picked up a cargo in Singapore in May. On her way home after a gale she started leaking badly and had to put into Mauritius. There she underwent three surveys, with Rennoldson dying between the first and the second. The mate took command. He determined after the surveys and taking quotes for repair costs that she was no longer worth repairing and sold her for breaking up. Her owners claimed against her insurance for total loss. The insurance took the matter to court, arguing in the case of Somes vs. Sugrue, that she could have been repaired. The jury found in favor of the insurance company, but the court permitted a retrial on the grounds that the jury had found against the evidence.
