= Julian Hall (British Army officer) =

British Army general (1837–1911)

Lieutenant-General Julian Hall
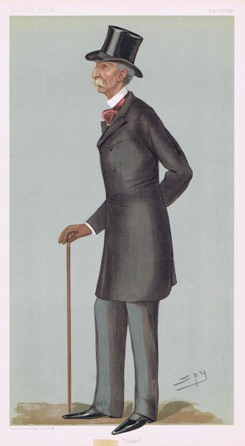
- Hall in Vanity Fair, 15 September 1898
- Born: 17 January 1837
- Died: 15 August 1911 (aged 74)
- Military career
- Allegiance: United Kingdom
- Branch: British Army
- Service years: 1854–1900
- Rank: Lieutenant-General
- Commands: North Western District
- Conflicts: Crimean War

Lieutenant-General Julian Hamilton Hall (17 January 1837 – 15 August 1911) was a British Army officer who became General Officer Commanding North Western District.

== Military career ==
Born the son of Sir John Hall, 5th Baronet, Hall was commissioned as an ensign in the Coldstream Guards on 2 August 1854. He saw action in the Crimean War. He became commanding officer of the Cheshire Regiment in May 1883 before moving on to be Assistant-Adjutant and Quartermaster-General at Headquarters Home District in December 1884 and General Officer Commanding North Western District from April 1890 to April 1895. He retired from the army on 1 April 1900.

Military offices
Preceded by William Goodenough	GOC North Western District; 1890–1895	Succeeded by Baker Russell
