= Thomas Dampier =

Bishop of Rochester and Ely

The Right Reverend Thomas Dampier
- Bishop of Ely
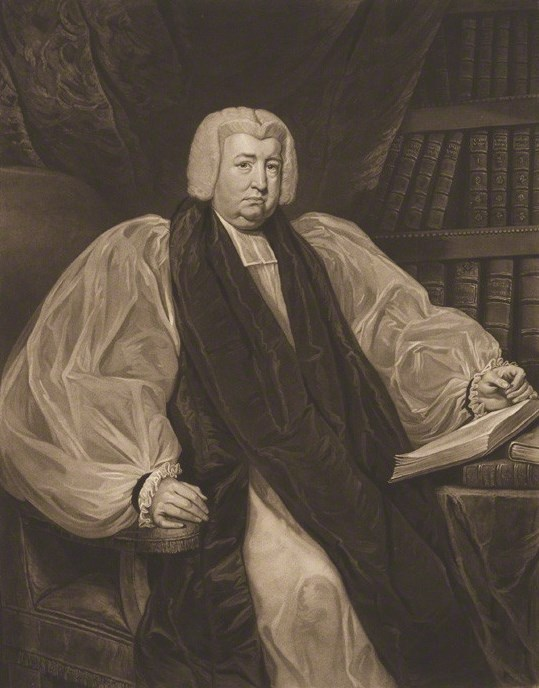
- Church: Church of England
- Diocese: Diocese of Ely
- Elected: 1808
- Term ended: 1812 (death)
- Predecessor: James Yorke
- Successor: Bowyer Sparke
- Other posts: Bishop of Rochester (1802–1809); Dean of Rochester (1782–1802)

Orders
- Consecration: c. 1802

Personal details
- Born: 1748
- Died: 13 May 1812 Ely House, London
- Denomination: Anglican
- Residence: Ely House, London
- Parents: Dr Thomas Dampier
- Spouse: Elizabeth Sleech
- Education: Eton College; King's College, Cambridge

Thomas Dampier (bapt. 14 February 1748 – 13 May 1812) served as Bishop of Rochester and Bishop of Ely.

== Life ==
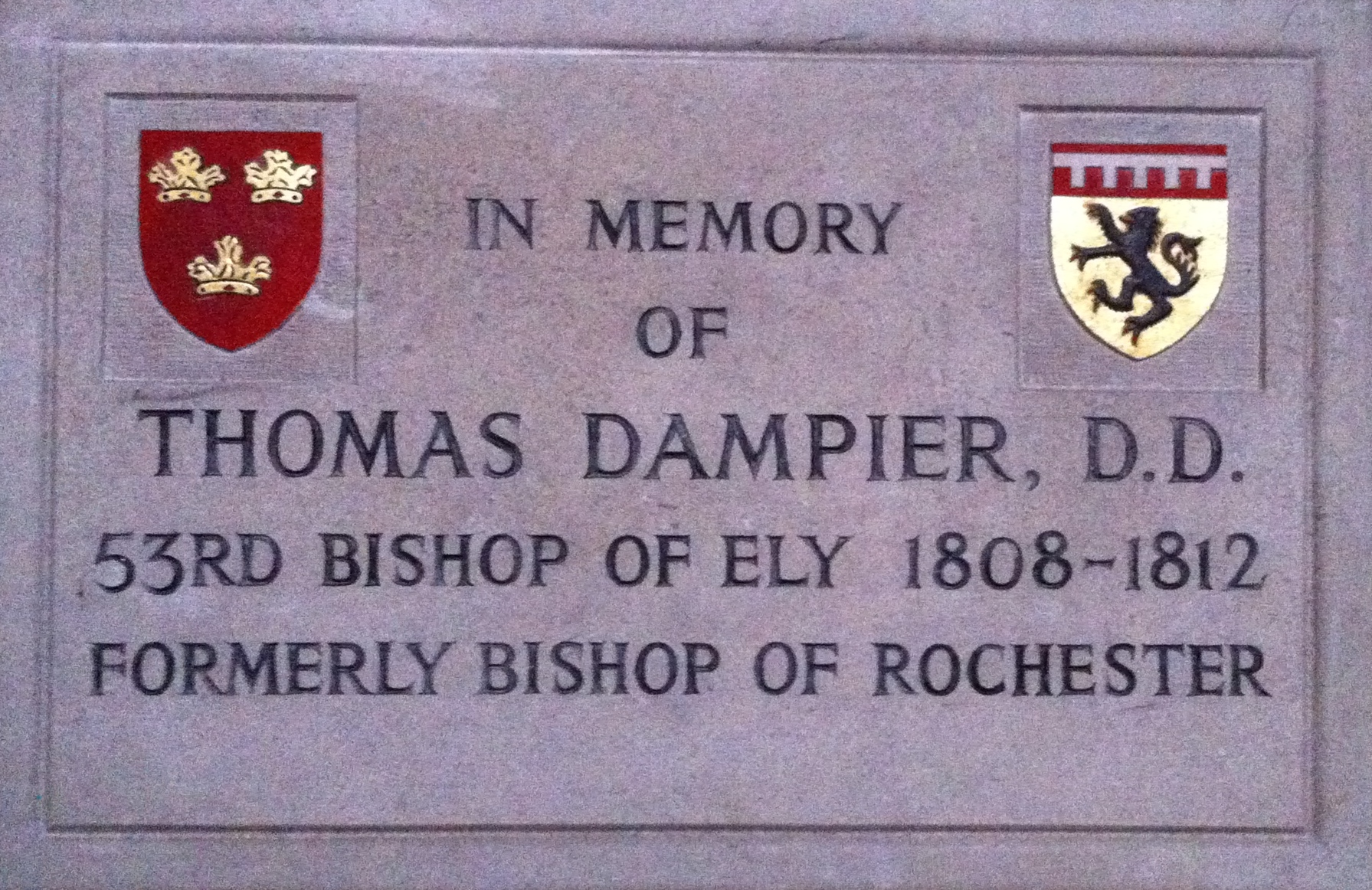
Memorial to Bishop Thomas Dampier in Ely Cathedral

Dampier was the eldest son of Dr Thomas Dampier, who was lower master at Eton College and from 1774 Dean of Durham, and his wife, Anne.

He was educated at Eton, and in 1766 elected to King's College, Cambridge. He graduated B.A. 1771, M.A. 1774, D.D. 1780. After taking his degree he resided for some time at Eton as private tutor to the Earl of Guilford, holding at the same time the vicarage of Bexley in Kent, while a few years later he succeeded to the mastership of Sherburn Hospital, which his father obtained leave to resign in his favour.

In 1782 he was promoted to the deanery of Rochester, and in 1802 to the bishopric of that diocese. As bishop of Rochester, he proposed an address from the clergy thanking the crown for requiring an undertaking from the ministry not to move in the matter of Catholic emancipation. The bishopric of Rochester was a poor one, and it was in his case, for the first time for some years past, separated from the deanery of Westminster. Dampier therefore looked for fresh promotion, and in 1808 was translated to Ely. He died suddenly on the evening of 13 May 1812 at Ely House in London. Dampier published several sermons.

He was known for his love of literature, and for the library and collection of prints which he accumulated throughout his life. He left a bibliophile's account in Latin, the manuscript of which was extensively used by Thomas Frognall Dibdin in compiling his Aedes Althorpianae. His library was sold by his half-brother (lawyer Sir Henry) and widow to the Duke of Devonshire at a valuation amounting to nearly £10,000.

Church of England titles
| Preceded by Richard Cust | Dean of Rochester; 1782–1802 | Succeeded by Samuel Goodenough |
| Preceded by Samuel Horsley | Bishop of Rochester; 1802–1809 | Succeeded by Walker King |
| Preceded by James Yorke | Bishop of Ely; 1808–1812 | Succeeded by Bowyer Sparke |
