= Henry Cotton (bishop) =

English bishop (c.1545–1615)

- Born: c.1545
- Died: 7 May 1615
- Occupation: Bishop
- Years active: 1598-1615
- Known for: Bishop of Salisbury

Henry Cotton (c.1545–7 May 1615) was an English bishop.

== Life ==
He was the son of Sir Richard Cotton of Warblington, Hampshire, and his wife Jane Onley.

He was a godson to Elizabeth I of England, and one of her chaplains. He was rector of Havant in 1567.

He was elected Bishop of Salisbury on 28 September 1598. He gained Royal Assent on 24 October, was confirmed on 11 November, and consecrated at Lambeth the next day, and had the temporalities restored to him on 23 December 1598. In his time as bishop, a long-running struggle by the city of Salisbury for its charter was resolved, in 1612.

He died in 1615 and was buried "in his own church" beside his wife, as he had requested in his Will.

== Notes ==
Church of England titles
Preceded by John Coldwell	Bishop of Salisbury; 1598–1615	Succeeded by Robert Abbot
