= Thomas Dale (priest) =

Anglican priest (1797–1870)

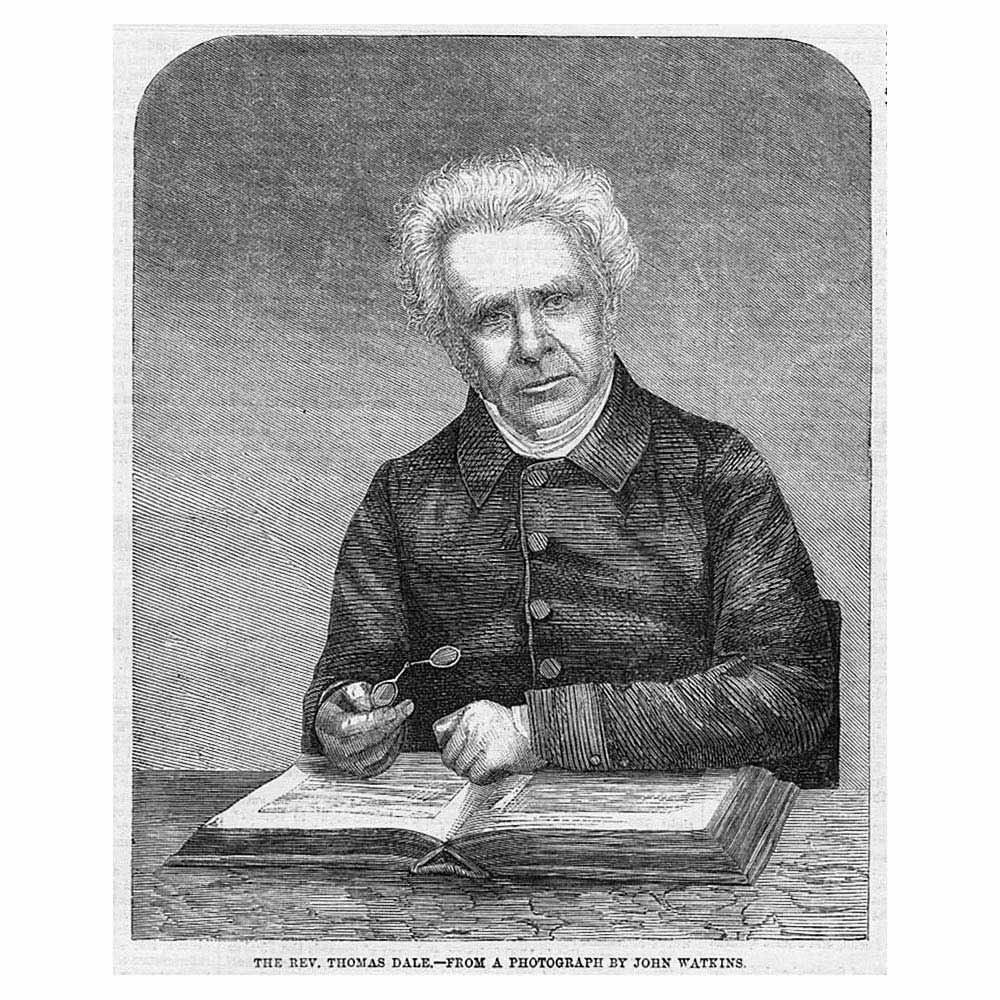
Thomas Dale

Thomas Dale (22 August 1797 – 14 May 1870) was a priest in the Church of England who was the Dean of Rochester for a brief period in 1870. He was also a poet and theologian.

== Life ==
Dale was born in Pentonville and educated at Christ's Hospital and Corpus Christi College, Cambridge.

Until 1826 Dale was a curate at St Michael, Cornhill, and then began a long association with St Bride, Fleet Street. He was also evening lecturer at St Sepulchre-without-Newgate before being appointed the incumbent of St Matthew's Denmark Hill. He served as Professor of English at London University from 1828 to 1830. This was the first professorial appointment in the subject of English in England. As an evangelical and "Christian ideologue" he found the university secular to the point of being "godless", clashed in particular with his colleague Thomas Hewitt Key, and resigned, to be succeeded by Alexander Blair. He then founded a school in Camberwell, where John Ruskin was among his pupils. In 1835, he became vicar of St. Bride, Fleet Street; and in 1836, professor of English literature at King’s College London, before resigning in 1839.

Dale became a prebendary of St Paul's Cathedral in 1843, holding the stall of Caddington Minor and an honorary canon. In 1846 he became vicar of St Pancras' Church and was also the Golden Lecturer at St Margaret Lothbury. While at St Pancras', William Brown Galloway was his curate. Dale is credited with founding St Mark's Church in St Mark's Square. His last position before becoming the dean in Rochester was at St Therfield Therfield.

== Family ==
Dale married Emily Jane Richardson (1803 - 1849) on 22 November 1819 in London. They had at least nine children, the eldest of whom Thomas Pelham Dale became an Anglo-Catholic ritualist priest who was prosecuted and imprisoned for ritualist practices.

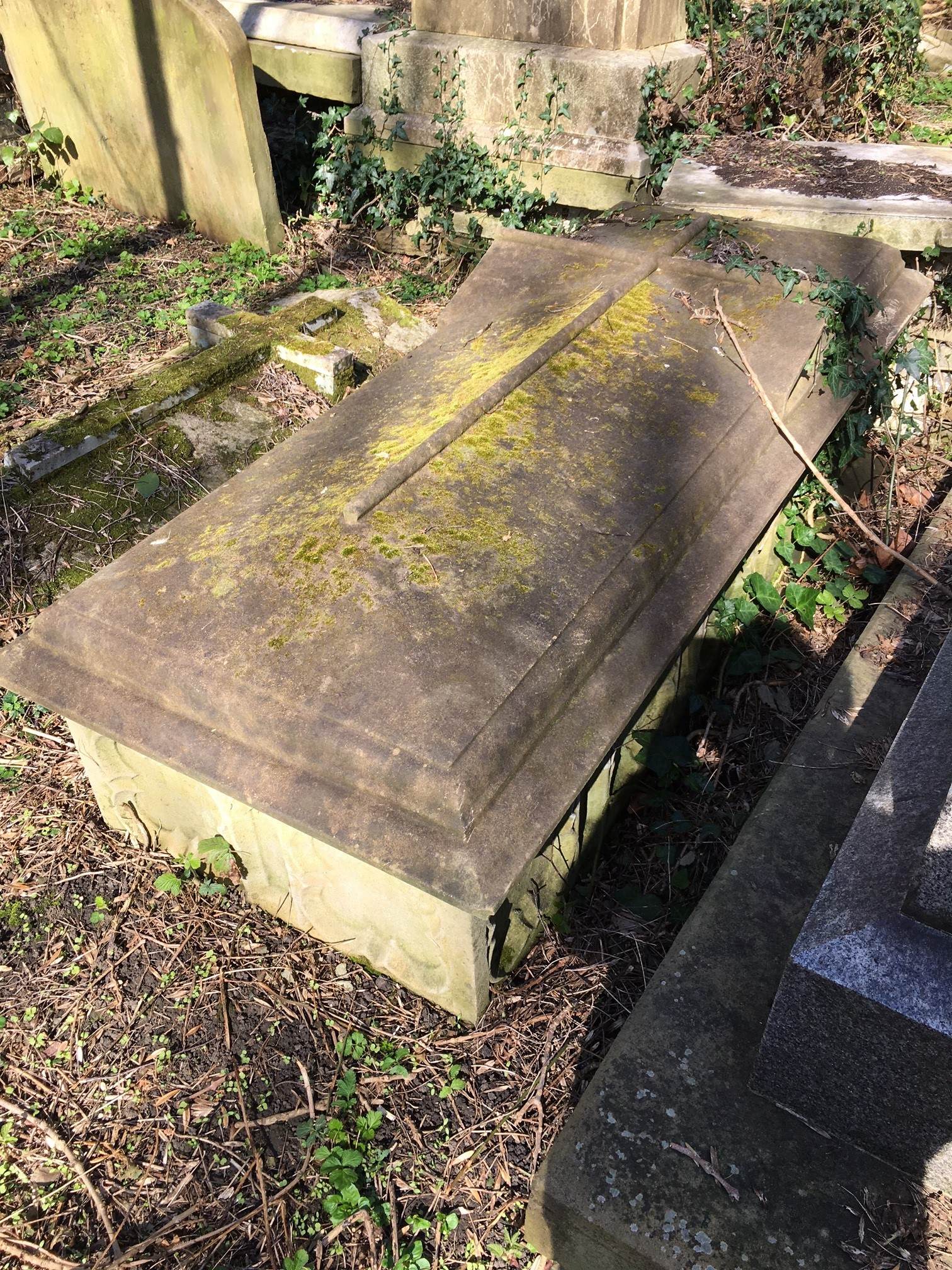
Grave of Thomas Dale in Highgate Cemetery

== Death ==
Thomas Dale died on 14 May 1870 and is buried on the western side of Highgate Cemetery, close to the grave of Catherine Dickens, which may not be coincidental given the Dickens' connection with Rochester. There is an inscription on the grave in remembrance of his wife Emily Jane, though she is buried in the vaults of St Pancras New Church. Dale, being convinced of the danger of interment in crowded centres, had put aside his strong desire to be placed beside her in death and given the weight of his influence to the sealing up of the vaults of the Church. It was said that from Dean Dale's grave in Highgate Cemetery, may be seen many of the churches he caused to be built.

== Works ==
- The widow of the city of Naïn: and other poems, 1819
- The Tragedies of Sophocles (translator), 1824
- An introductory lecture upon the study of theology and of the Greek testament delivered at the opening of the Theological Institution, Saturday, Nov. 21st, 1829
- The poetical works of the Rev. Thomas Dale, M.A., 1836

Church of England titles
Preceded by Robert Stevens	Dean of Rochester; February–May 1870	Succeeded by Robert Scott
