= Robert Stevens (priest) =

Dean of Rochester (1777–1870)

Robert Stevens (1777 – 3 February 1870) was a long serving Dean of Rochester in the 19th century.

Stevens was the son of Robert Stevens of Norwich. He was born in Botesdale, Suffolk and was educated at Westminster School where he took part in the First school cricket match in 1794 between Westminster and Charterhouse School (as London). He took three wickets and scored 26. Later he played in the first match against Eton College in 1796. He was admitted at Trinity College, Cambridge on 27 June 1797 where he was a scholar and was awarded BA in 1801. He played for Marylebone Cricket Club (MCC) from 1797 to 1799. He was ordained deacon at Norwich on 3 May 1801 and priest at London on 1 August 1802. In 1804 he was awarded MA at Cambridge. From 1808 to 1820 he was lecturer at St Margaret's, Westminster. In 1814 he became Rector of St James, Garlickhithe, and also prebendary of Lincoln. He became Chaplain of the House of Commons in 1816.

In 1820 Stevens became vicar of West Farleigh, Kent and was also appointed Dean of Rochester He was author of Sermons on our Duty toward God, our Neighbour and Ourselves, Discourse on the Apostles' Creed and Counsel of God in the Redemption of the World.

Stevens died in post at the Deanery on 3 February 1870.

Stevens married Elizabeth Mason on 15 July 1806.

Church of England titles
Preceded by William Busby	Dean of Rochester; 1820–1870	Succeeded by Thomas Dale
