= Reginald Talbot (priest) =

Reginald Thomas Talbot (1862 - 29 March 1935) was an Anglican priest in the first part of the 20th century.

Talbot was educated at Clifton College and Exeter College, Oxford. He was ordained in 1886 and was a curate at Gateshead Parish Church and then a lecturer in church history and doctrine in the Dioceses of Durham, Ripon and Newcastle. He then held incumbencies in Sunderland and Derby. From 1906 to 1928 he was a Canon Residentiary at Bristol Cathedral and Archdeacon of Swindon. He was then Dean of Rochester until his retirement in 1932.

Church of England titles
Preceded by John Storrs	Dean of Rochester; 1928–1932	Succeeded by Francis Underhill
