= William Howley Goodenough =

British Army general (1833–1898)

Lieutenant-General Sir William Howley Goodenough KCB
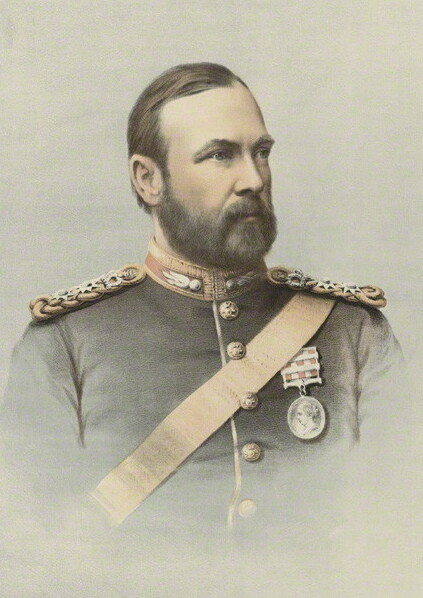
- Born: 4 April 1833; Wells, Mendip District, Somerset, England
- Died: 24 October 1898 (aged 65); Erinville, Rondebosch, Western Cape
- Relatives: Edmund Goodenough (father); James Graham Goodenough (brother); Samuel Pepys Cockerell (maternal grandfather)
- Military career
- Allegiance: United Kingdom
- Branch: British Army
- Service years: 1849–1898
- Rank: Lieutenant-General
- Conflicts: Indian Rebellion; Siege of Lucknow; Anglo-Egyptian War

Lieutenant-General Sir William Howley Goodenough KCB (4 April 1833 – 24 October 1898) was a British Army officer who became General Officer Commanding North-West District.

== Military career ==
Born the son of Edmund Goodenough, Head Master of Westminster School, Goodenough was commissioned as a second lieutenant in the Royal Artillery on 20 June 1849. He was promoted to lieutenant on 1 April 1851, to captain on 1 January 1856 and to major on 20 July 1858. He fought and was wounded at the Siege of Lucknow during the Indian Rebellion. Promoted to lieutenant-colonel on 25 March 1869, he became military attaché in Vienna in 1871.

He commanded the artillery during the Anglo-Egyptian War in 1882. He went on to be Inspector-General of Royal Artillery in August 1886, General Officer Commanding North-West District in July 1889 and General Officer Commanding, Chatham District in April 1890. His last appointment was as General Officer Commanding-in-Chief, Cape of Good Hope in December 1894, in which capacity he briefly acted as Governor of Cape Colony in 1897, before retiring in October 1898.

Military offices
Preceded by New Post	GOC North Western District; 1889–1890	Succeeded by Julian Hall
