= Richard Cust (priest) =

English clergyman

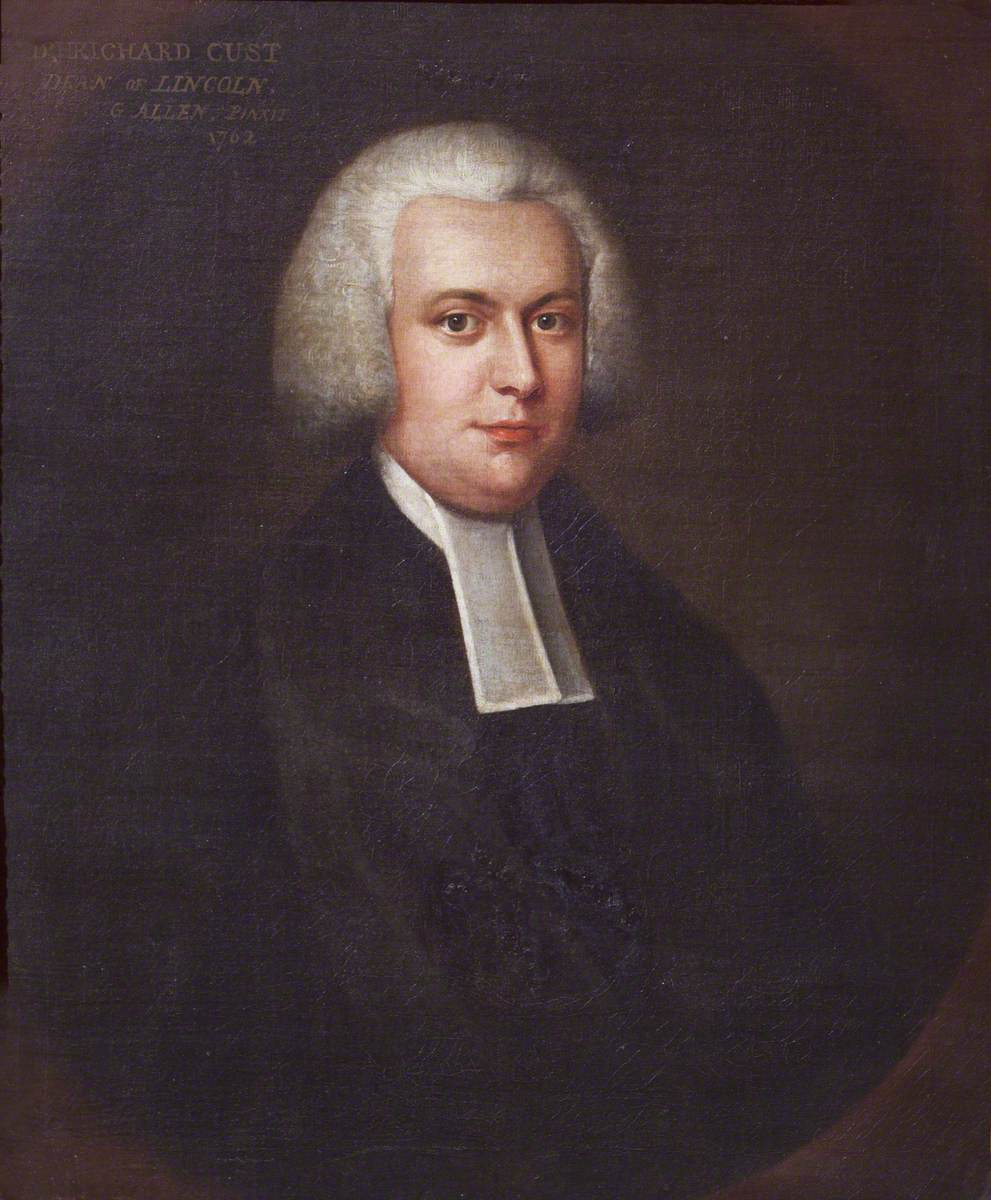
Richard Cust, portrait by George Allen

Richard Cust (1728 – 16 October 1783) was an English clergyman who served as Chaplain to the Speaker of the House of Commons, Dean of Rochester and Dean of Lincoln.

== Life ==
Cust was the son of Sir Richard Cust Bt and his wife Anne Brownlow, daughter of Sir William Brownlow Bt MP. He was educated at Merton College, Oxford, matriculating in 1745 aged 17, graduating B.A. 1749, M.A. 1752, B.D. & D.D. 1763.

Cust was Speaker's Chaplain to his brother, Speaker Sir John Cust Bt MP. He was appointed a Canon of Christ Church, Oxford in October 1765, and rector of Belton, Lincolnshire in 1770. He also served as Dean of Rochester 1779–1782 and Dean of Lincoln 1782–1783.

Cust died on 16 October 1783 at The Old Deanery, Lincoln.

== Family ==
In 1767, Cust married Mary Harris, daughter of Rev. George Harris. He died without issue.

Church of England titles
Preceded by Thomas Thurlow	Dean of Rochester; 1779–1782	Succeeded by Thomas Dampier
Preceded by Hon. James Yorke	Dean of Lincoln; 1782–1783	Succeeded by Sir Richard Kaye
