= Dean of Rochester =

Head of the chapter of canons at Rochester Cathedral, Church of England

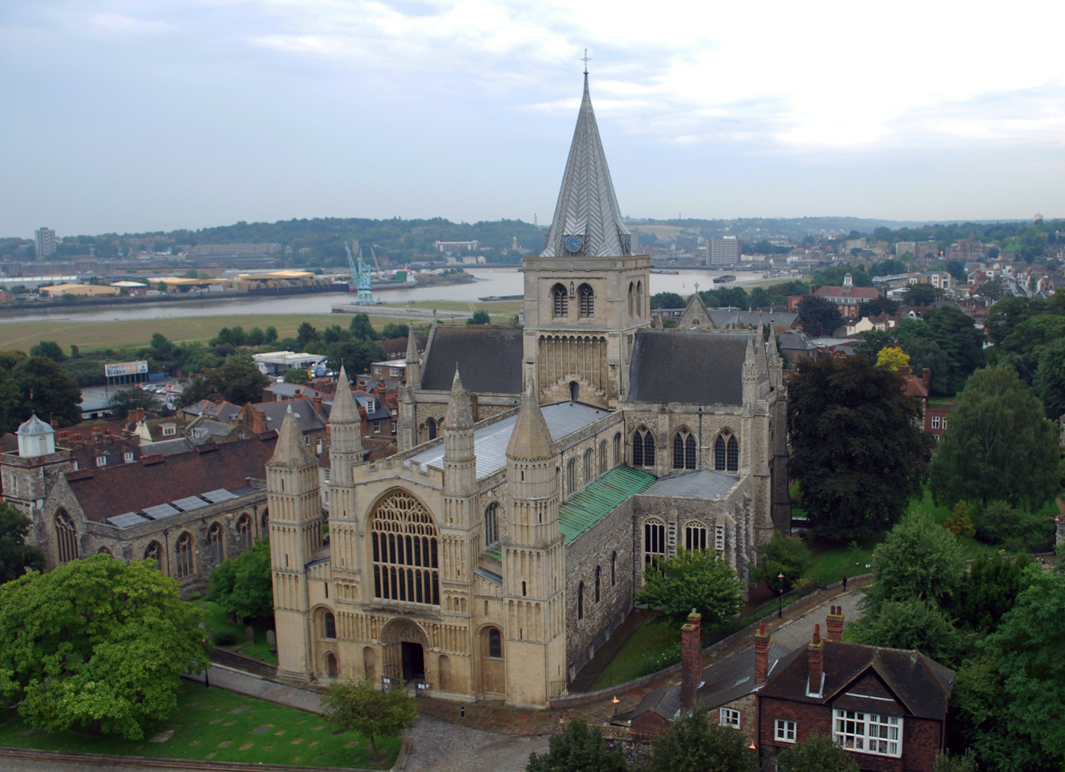
Rochester Cathedral

The Dean of Rochester is the head of the chapter of canons at Rochester Cathedral, the mother church of the Church of England Diocese of Rochester. The current dean is Philip Hesketh, who has served in that role since June 2016.

== List of deans ==
=== Early modern ===
- 1541–1570 Walter Phillips
- 1570–1572 Edmund Freke
- 1572–1581 Thomas Willoughby
- 1581–1591 John Coldwell
- 1592–1611 Thomas Blague
- 1611–1615 Richard Milbourne
- 1615–1620 Robert Scott (elder)
- 1621–1624 Godfrey Goodman
- 1625–1639 Walter Balcanquhall
- 1639–1642 Henry King
- 1642–1644 Thomas Turner
- 1644–1660 Vacancy (Commonwealth)
- 1660 Benjamin Lany
- 1661–1670 Nathaniel Hardy
- 1670–1673 Peter Mews
- 1673–1688 Thomas Lamplugh
- 1676–1688 John Castilion
- 1688 Simon Lowth (nominated)
- 1689–1706 Henry Ullock
- 1706–1723 Samuel Pratt
- 1724–1732 Nicholas Clagett
- 1732–1743 Thomas Herring
- 1743–1744 William Barnard
- 1744–1765 John Newcombe
- 1765–1767 William Markham
- 1767–1775 Benjamin Newcombe
- 1775–1779 Thomas Thurlow
- 1779–1782 Richard Cust
- 1782–1802 Thomas Dampier

=== Late modern ===
- 1802–1808 Samuel Goodenough
- 1808–1820 William Busby
- 1820–1870 Robert Stevens
- 1870–1870 Thomas Dale
- 1870–1887 Robert Scott (younger)
- 1887–1904 Samuel Hole
- 1904–1913 Ernald Lane
- 1913–1928 John Storrs
- 1928–1932 Reginald Talbot
- 1932–1937 Francis Underhill
- 1937–1943 Ernest Blackie
- 1943–1958 Thomas Crick
- 1959–1966 Robert Stannard
- 1966–1977 Stanley Betts
- 1978–1989 John Arnold
- 1989–2003 Edward Shotter
- 2003–2005 Jonathan Meyrick (Acting)
- 2005–2011 Adrian Newman
- 2011–2012 Philip Hesketh (Acting)
- 2012–25 January 2015 (res.): Mark Beach
- 25 January 2015 – 16 June 2016: Philip Hesketh (Acting)
- 16 June 2016–present: Philip Hesketh

== Sources ==
- British History Online – Fasti Ecclesiae Anglicanae 1541–1857 – Deans of Rochester
- The Archives of the Dean and Chapter of Rochester, 1541-1907
