= 1794 English cricket season =

Cricket season review

Berkshire had a strong county team in the 1794 English cricket season.

Details of eighteen matches are known, but few were historically important. (Note: Any match listed in the ACS' Important Match Guide (1981) is historically important, and therefore of the highest standard, whether or not a scorecard might exist. The same applies to numerous matches discovered by researchers since 1981. For further information, see First-class cricket.)

== Berkshire ==
Berkshire lost twice to MCC in July. They recovered to win a third match by 7 runs, and then a fourth by 6 wickets. At the end of August, Berkshire defeated Kent by 49 runs.

== Bibliography ==
- ACS (1981). A Guide to Important Cricket Matches Played in the British Isles 1709–1863. Nottingham: ACS. OCLC 85045528.
- Haygarth, Arthur (1996) [1862]. Scores & Biographies, Volume 1 (1744–1826). Kennington: Frederick Lillywhite. ISBN 978-19-00592-23-9.
