= Webster baronets =

Extinct baronetcy in the Baronetage of the United Kingdom

There have been two Webster baronetcies.

== Webster baronets, of Copthall, in the County of Essex (1703) ==
Escutcheon of the Webster baronets of Copthall

Created on 21 May 1703 in the Baronetage of England.

- Sir Thomas Webster, 1st Baronet (1676–1751, Member of Parliament (MP) for Colchester 1705–1711, 1713–1714 and 1722–1727
- Sir Whistler Webster, 2nd Baronet (after 1699–1779), MP for East Grinstead 1741–1761
- Sir Godfrey Webster, 3rd Baronet (died 1780)
- Sir Godfrey Webster, 4th Baronet (1747–1800), MP for Seaford 1786–1790 and Wareham 1796–1800
- Sir Godfrey Vassal Webster, 5th Baronet (1789–1836), MP for Sussex 1812–1820
- Sir Godfrey Vassal Webster, 6th Baronet (1815–1853)
- Sir Augustus Frederick George Douglas Webster, 7th Baronet (1819–1886)
- Sir Augustus Frederick Walpole Edward Webster, 8th Baronet (1864–1923)

Extinct on the death of the 8th Baronet

== Webster baronets, of Alverstone, Isle of Wight (1900) ==
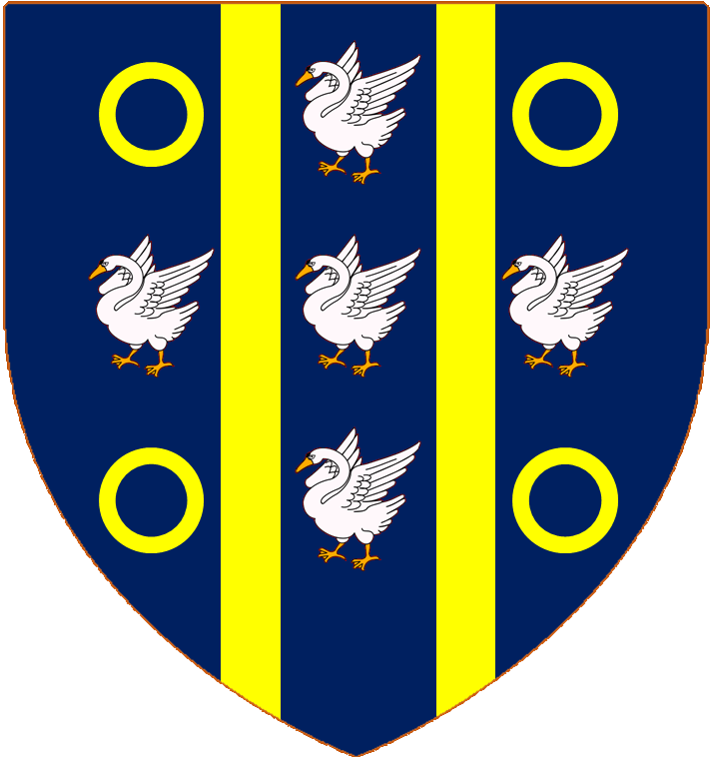
Escutcheon of the Webster baronets of Alverstone

Created on 25 January 1900 in the Baronetage of the United Kingdom. Baronet of Winterfold, in the parish of Cranleigh, in the county of Surrey, and of Alverstone, in the parish of Brading, in the Isle of Wight and county of Southampton

- Sir Richard Everard Webster, 1st Baronet (1842–1915), for Launceston 1885 and Isle of Wight 1885–1900

The 1st Baronet was subsequently created Baron Alverstone in 1900 with which title the baronetcy then merged until their extinction on the death of the 1st Baronet in 1915.

== Sources ==
- Leigh Rayment's list of baronets – Baronetcies beginning with "W" (part 1)
