= Sir Godfrey Webster, 5th Baronet =

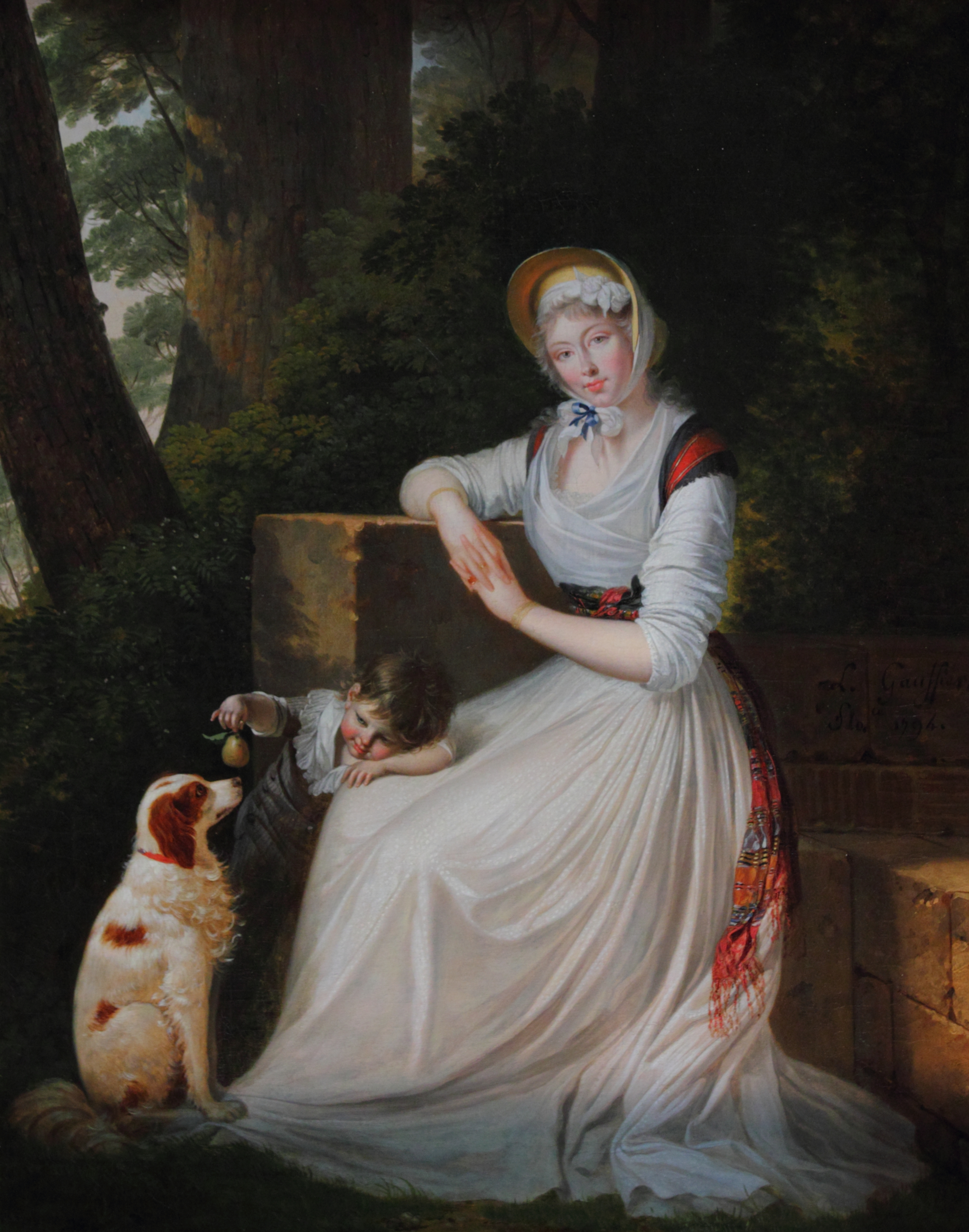
Godfrey Webster with his mother, by Louis Gauffier (1794)

Sir Godfrey Vassall Webster, 5th Baronet (6 October 1789 – 17 July 1836) was an English Tory Member of Parliament (MP).

Webster succeeded to the baronetcy in May 1800.

He was elected at the 1812 general election as an MP for Sussex. He was re-elected in 1818, and held the seat until the 1820 general election, when he did not stand again in Sussex.

In 1815 he was one of the Original Members of the Royal Yacht Squadron.

Parliament of the United Kingdom
Preceded by Charles William Wyndham; John 'Mad Jack' Fuller	Member of Parliament for Sussex; 1812 – 1820; With: Walter Burrell	Succeeded by Edward Jeremiah Curteis; Walter Burrell
Baronetage of England
Preceded by Godfrey Webster	Baronet (of Copthall, Essex); 1800–1836	Succeeded by Godfrey Vassall Webster
