= William Busby (priest) =

- Born: 1757
- Died: 1820 (aged 62–63)

William Beaumont Busby (1757 – 31 August 1820) was Dean of Rochester from 1808 to 1820.

He was born in 1757 and educated at Winchester and New College, Oxford. Appointed 43rd Chaplain to the Speaker of the House of Commons by Speaker Henry Addington in 1796, he was Rector of Upper Heyford, Oxfordshire, and then Canon of the First Stall, St George's Chapel, Windsor, from 1803 to 1808 before his elevation to the Deanery.

He died on 31 August 1820.

Church of England titles
Preceded by Samuel Goodenough	Dean of Rochester; 1808 – May 1820	Succeeded by Robert Stevens
