= John Coldwell =

English physician and bishop

John Coldwell (c.1535–1596) was an English physician and bishop.

== Life ==
He was born at Faversham. He graduated B.A. at St. John's College, Cambridge, in 1555, where he became a Fellow and graduated M.A. in 1558. He graduated M.D. in 1564.

Coldwell is said to have practiced as a physician, in Kent; he corresponded with John Hall of Maidstone, the surgeon. He became Archdeacon of Chichester in July 1571 and served until May 1575. He was rector of Aldington, Kent in 1558, of Tunstall, Kent in 1572, and of Saltwood in 1580. In 1581, he became Dean of Rochester, on the recommendation of the Archbishop of Canterbury, Edmund Grindal.

He became Bishop of Salisbury in 1591. His appointment was delayed by an intrigue, involving Robert Bennet as another candidate, and designed to secure from the diocese the site of Sherborne Castle for Walter Raleigh. He was accused of impoverishing his see; during his episcopate Sir Walter Raleigh robbed it of the castle, park, and parsonage of Sherborne, together with other possessions. A bishop, however, had little chance of keeping anything if the queen or one of her favourites wanted it. Coldwell complains bitterly of Raleigh in a letter to Henry Brook, dated 10 April 1594, and on 22 April 1596 prays Sir Robert Cecil to tell him that owing to the conduct of "his man Mears" in keeping his "farm and arrearages" from him he could pay his duties.

He died on 14 October 1596, and was then so deeply in debt that it is said that his friends were glad to bury him "suddenly and secretly" in the grave of Robert Wyvil, a C14 bishop of Salisbury.

== Notes ==
=== Attribution ===
This article incorporates text from a publication now in the public domain: Hunt, William (1887). "Coldwell, John". In Stephen, Leslie (ed.). Dictionary of National Biography. Vol. 11. London: Smith, Elder & Co. p. 263.

Church of England titles
Preceded by John Piers	Bishop of Salisbury; 1591–1596	Succeeded by Henry Cotton
