= Samuel Goodenough =

English clergyman (1743-1827)

The Right Reverend Samuel Goodenough
- Bishop of Carlisle
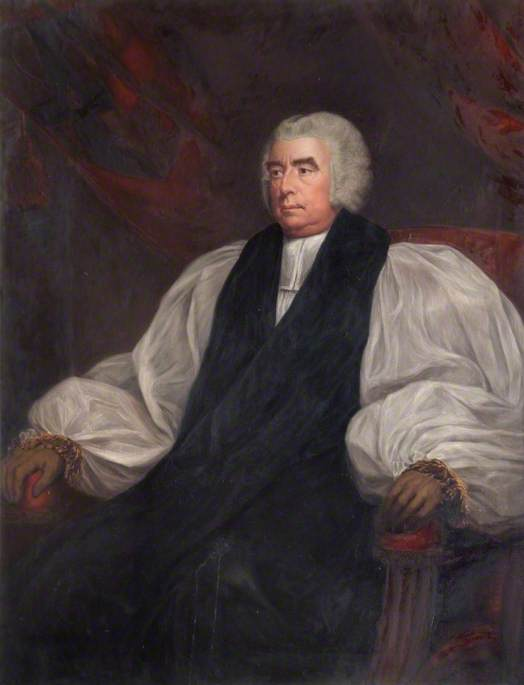
- Diocese: Diocese of Carlisle
- In office: 1808–1827 (death)
- Predecessor: Edward Venables-Vernon
- Successor: Hugh Percy
- Other post: Dean of Rochester (1802–1808)

Personal details
- Born: 10 May 1743 Weyhill, Hampshire, England
- Died: 12 August 1827 (aged 84) Acton Green, London, England
- Buried: Westminster Abbey
- Denomination: Anglican
- Spouse: Elizabeth Ford (m. 1770)
- Children: 7
- Profession: Botanist, Orchidologist
- Education: Westminster School; Christ Church, Oxford

Samuel Goodenough (10 May [O.S. 29 April] 1743 – 12 August 1827) was the Bishop of Carlisle from 1808 until his death in 1827, and an amateur botanist and collector. He is honoured in the scientific names of the plant genus Goodenia and the red-capped robin (Petroica goodenovii). In addition, William Kirby's 1802 book on the bees of England (Monographia Apum Anglia), page 182, mentions, in Latin, that the cuckoo bee Nomada goodeniana (Gooden's Nomad Bee) is named after Goodenough with the following words:

A viro Reverendo S. Goodenough, LL. D. Canonico Windsoriensi, Botanico summo tum et in Entomologia lynceo, nomen suum haec Apis mutuatur. (From the Reverend S. Goodenough, LL.D., Canon of Windsor, a great botanist and keen observer in entomology, this bee takes its name.)

== Life ==
Born at Kimpton, near Weyhill, Hampshire, on 29 April 1743 (O.S.), he was the third son of the Rev. William Goodenough, rector of Broughton Poggs, Oxfordshire. In 1750 the family returned to Broughton, and Samuel was sent to school at Witney, under the Rev. B. Gutteridge; five years later he was sent to Westminster School, where William Markham was headmaster. He became king's scholar, and in 1760 was elected to a studentship at Christ Church, Oxford, took his B.A. degree 9 May 1764, and proceeded M.A. 25 June 1767 and D.C.L. 11 July 1772.

In 1766 Goodenough returned to Westminster as under-master for four years, when he left the post for the church, having inherited from his father the advowson of Broughton Poggs, and received from his college the vicarage of Brize Norton, Oxfordshire. He married on 17 April 1770 Elizabeth, eldest daughter of Dr. James Ford, formerly physician to the Middlesex Hospital. Two years subsequently he established a school at Ealing, and carried it on for 26 years, during which time he had the charge of the sons of many noblemen and gentlemen of position.

Goodenough had a reputation as a classical tutor, but his strongest bent was towards botany, and when the Linnean Society was established in 1787 he was one of the framers of its constitution and treasurer during its first year. He contributed a classical memoir on the genus Carex to the second and third volumes of its ‘Transactions’. In addition to being one of the vice-presidents of the Linnean, while Sir J. E. Smith being president, he was for some time a vice-president of the Royal Society (of which he became a Fellow in 1789) while Sir Joseph Banks presided, and he also shared in the running of the Society of Antiquaries.

In 1797 he was presented to the vicarage of Cropredy by the Bishop of Oxford, in the following year he was advanced to the canonry of St George's Chapel, Windsor, and in 1802 promoted to the deanery of Rochester. In this preferment he was aided by William Cavendish-Bentinck, 3rd Duke of Portland, all of whose sons had been his pupils. By the Duke's favour Goodenough in 1808 was elevated to the episcopal bench as bishop of Carlisle. He died at Worthing on 12 August 1827, surviving the loss of his wife only eleven weeks, and was buried on the 18th of that month in the north cloister of Westminster Abbey.

He left three sons, all clergymen (Samuel James, Robert Philip and Edmund), and four daughters.

== Notes ==
=== Attribution ===
This article incorporates text from a publication now in the public domain: "Goodenough, Samuel". Dictionary of National Biography. London: Smith, Elder & Co. 1885–1900.

Church of England titles
Preceded by Thomas Dampier	Dean of Rochester; 1802–1808	Succeeded by William Busby
Preceded by Edward Venables-Vernon-Harcourt	Bishop of Carlisle; 1808–1827	Succeeded by Hugh Percy
