= Sir Godfrey Webster, 4th Baronet =

English politician (1747–1800)

Sir Godfrey Webster, 4th Baronet (25 December 1747 – 3 June 1800) was an English politician. He used the additional surname Vassall in the period 1795 to 1797.

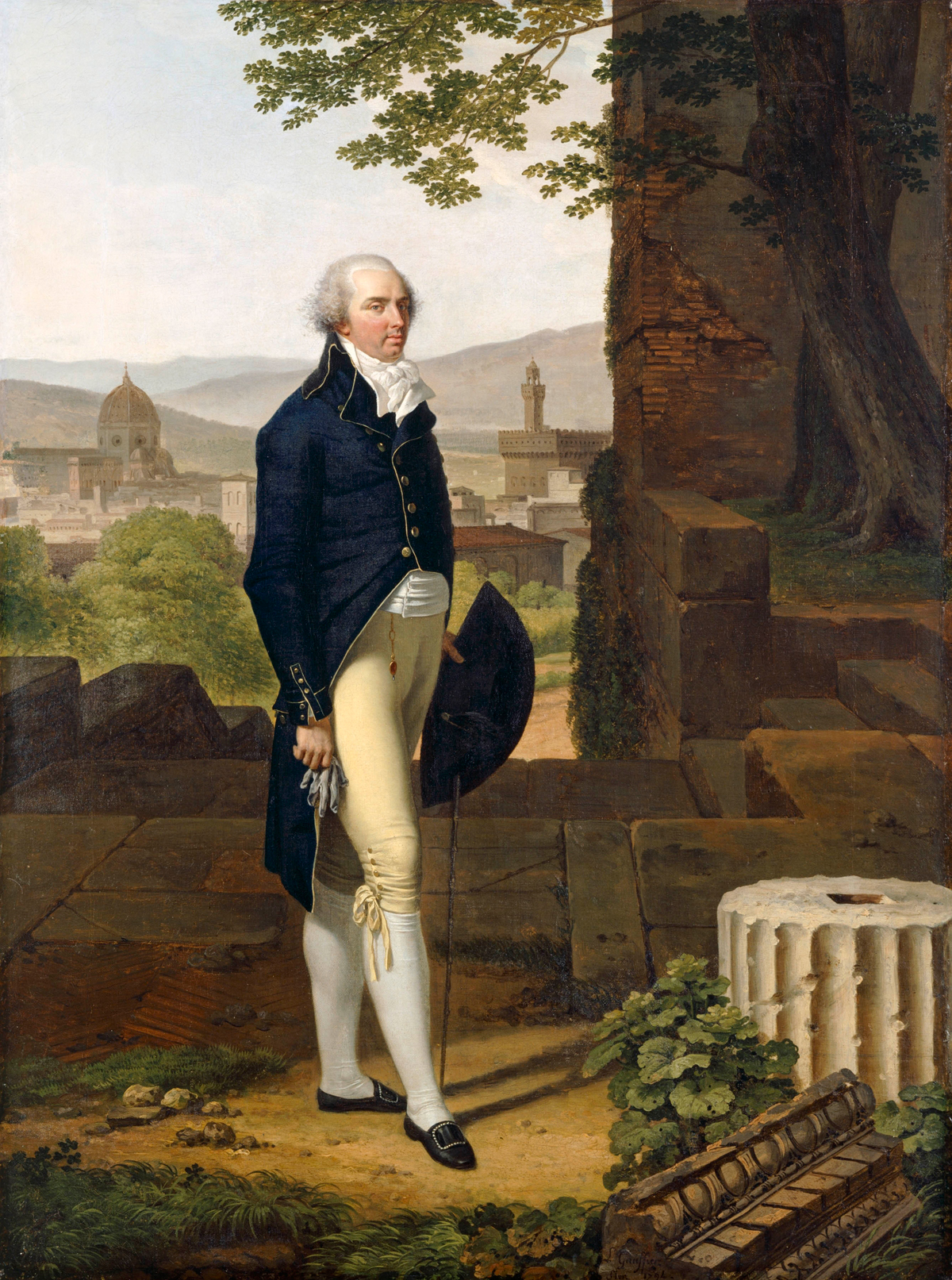
Sir Godfrey Webster, 4th Baronet, 1796 portrait by Louis Gauffier

== Life ==
He was the son of Sir Godfrey Webster, 3rd Baronet and Elizabeth Cooper of Lockington, Derbyshire, and nephew of Sir Whistler Webster, 2nd Baronet.

=== In politics ===
In January 1780 Webster was on a Sussex committee set up to support the reformist Yorkshire Association. In 1783 he was fighting in a Sussex reform meeting for a general petition. In 1786 he entered parliament as MP for Seaford, with support from the Pelham interest, and after a petition. Standing there again in 1790 with John Tarleton, he was defeated, but Tarleton was elected after a petition. He was back in Parliament in 1796, for Wareham.

=== Personal life ===
Webster's uncle, the 2nd baronet, died in 1779, and about half a year later his father died in 1780, making him the 4th baronet. He inherited also Battle Abbey with its estate, but not with vacant possession since his aunt remained in residence.

Webster was elected a Fellow of the Royal Society in 1786. He committed suicide, shooting himself on 3 June 1800 after gambling losses.

== Family ==
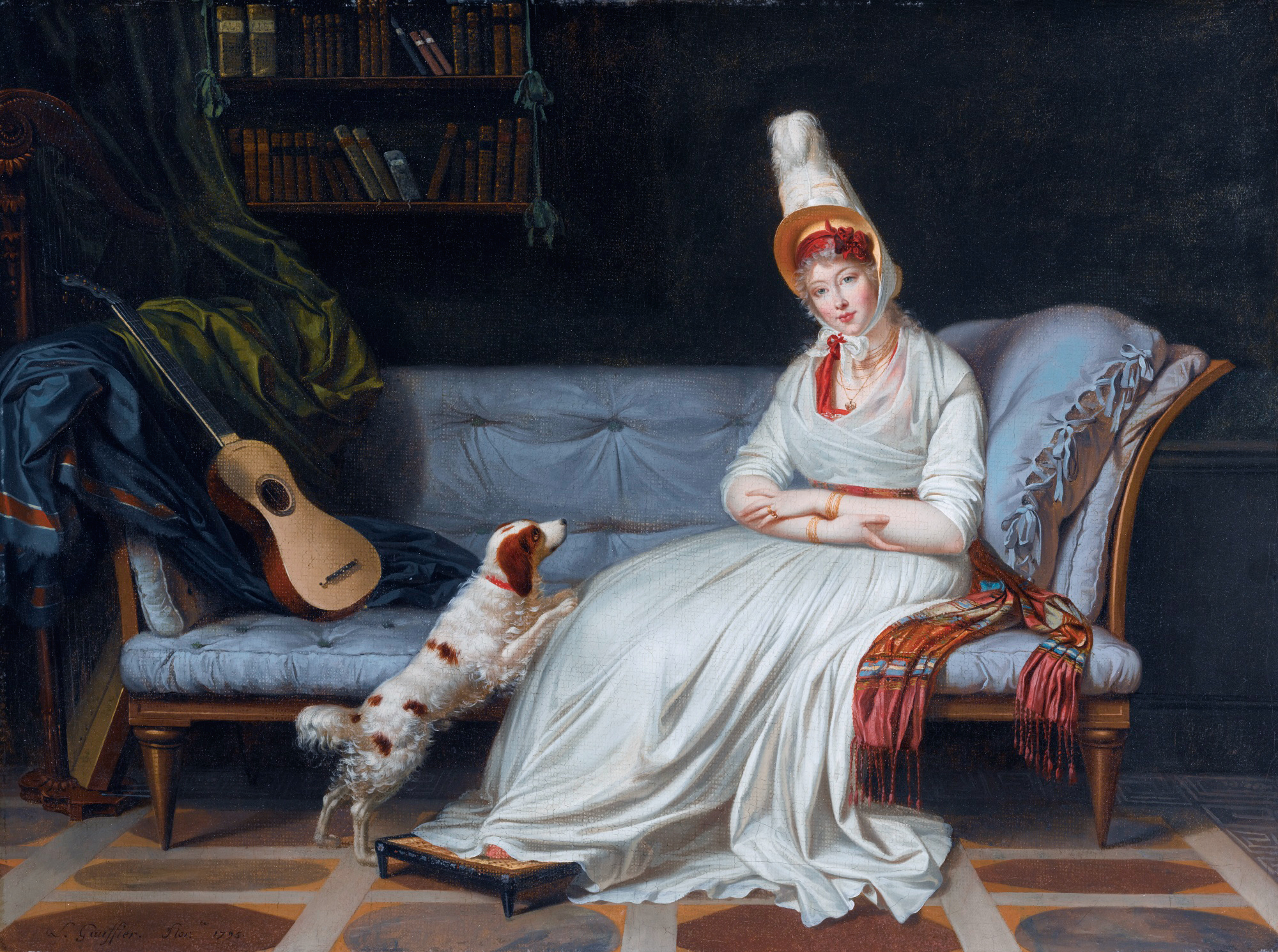
Lady Webster about 1795, by Louis Gauffier

Webster married, in 1786, Elizabeth Vassall (born 1771), daughter and heiress of Richard Vassall of Jamaica. It was a disastrous union which ended in divorce after Elizabeth's repeated affairs with other men. They had three children, not including two sons who died young:

- Godfrey Vassall Webster, the 5th baronet;
- Henry Vassall Webster;
- Harriet Frances Webster, who married Fleetwood Pellew.

== Notes ==
Baronetage of England
Preceded by Godfrey Webster	Baronet (of Copthall); 1780–1800	Succeeded by Godfrey Webster
