= Baker (surname) =

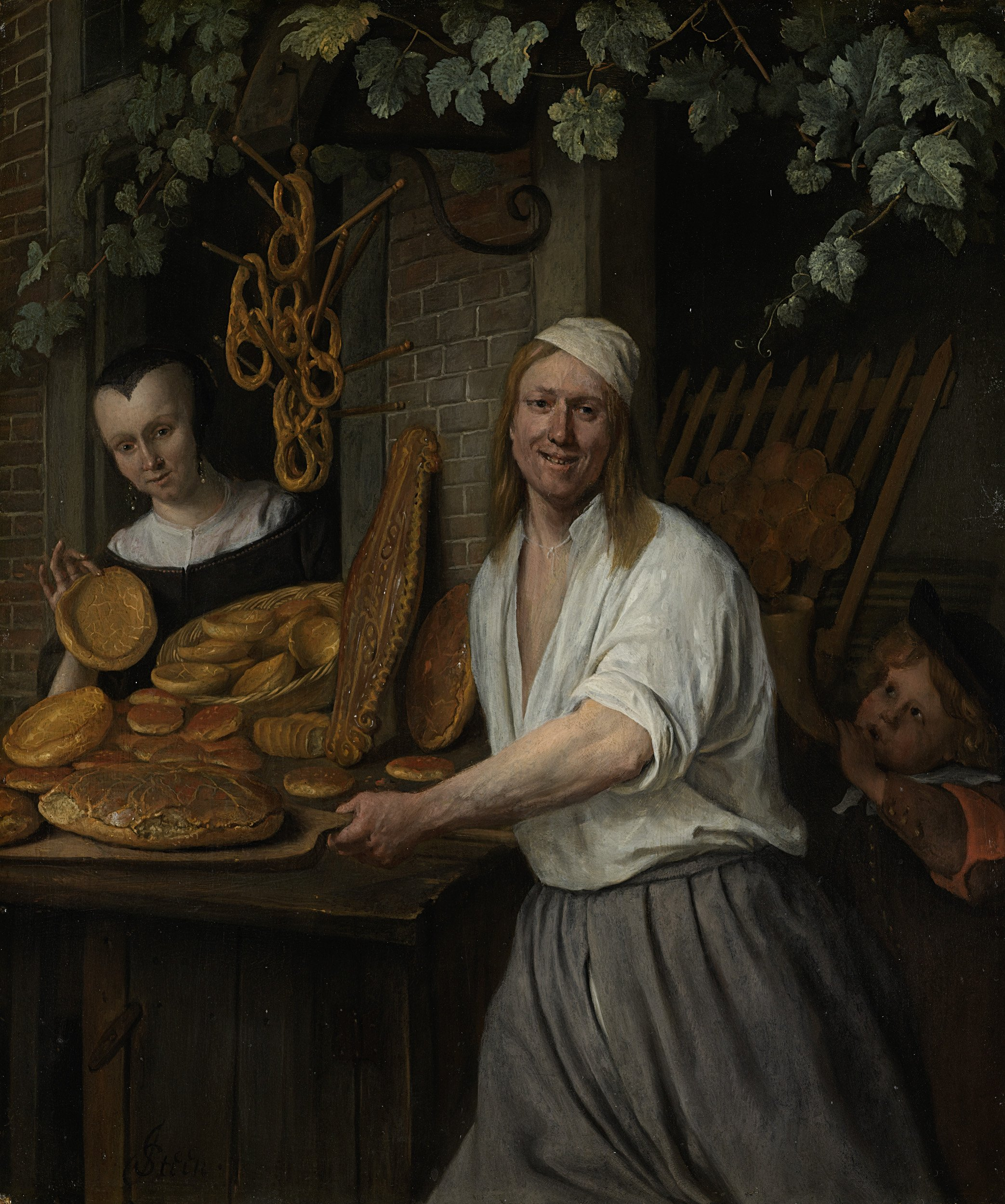
- The Baker Arent Oostwaard and his Wife, Catharina Keizerswaard, (1658), by Jan Steen
- Language: English

Origin
- Meaning: Baker (occupational)
- Region of origin: England and Scottish Borderlands

Other names
- Variant forms: Baxter, Mac a' Bhacstair

Baker is a common surname of Old English (Anglo-Saxon) origin and Scotland where Gaelic was anglicized. From England the surname has spread to neighbouring countries such as Wales, Scotland and Ireland, and also to the English speaking areas of the Americas and Oceania where it is also common. The gaelic form of Baker in Scotland and Ireland is Mac a' Bhacstair. Some people with the surname have used DNA to trace their origins to Celtic countries and specifically to the Baxter sept of the Clan MacMillan in Scotland. It is an occupational name, which originated before the 8th century CE, from the name of the trade, baker. From the Middle English bakere and Old English bæcere, a derivation of bacan, meaning "to dry by heat". The bearer of this name may not only have been a baker of bread. The name was also used for others involved with baking in some way, including the owner of a communal oven in humbler communities. The female form of the name is Baxter, which is seen more in Scotland. The German form of the name is Bäcker.

The name, Baker, appeared in many references, and from time to time, the surname was spelt Baker, Bakere and these changes in spelling frequently occurred within the family name. Scribes and church officials spelt the name as it sounded, and frequently the spelling changed even during the person's own lifetime. The family name Baker entered Britain with the Anglo-Saxons, who traditionally are said to have settled Britain from the 5th century CE, although Germanic communities were already well established in Britain long before this time.

Notable people with the surname include:

== A ==
- A. J. Baker (1923–2017), Australian philosopher
- Aaron Baker (1620–1683), English colonial agent
- Ada Baker (1866–1949), Australian soprano, vaudeville star and singing teacher
- Adam J. Baker (1821–1912), Canadian politician
- Adam Baker (footballer) (born 1993), English footballer
- Al Baker (magician) (1874–1951), American magician
- Al Baker (baseball) (1906–1982), American baseball player
- Alan Baker (disambiguation), multiple people
- Albert Baker (disambiguation), multiple people
- Alexander Baker (Jesuit) (1582–1638), English Jesuit
- Alexander Baker (MP) (1611–1685), English lawyer and politician
- Alf Baker (1898–1955), English footballer (Arsenal)
- Alfred Joseph Baker (1846–1900), played for England in England v Scotland representative matches (1870–1872)
- Alfred Baker (academic) (1848–1942), Canadian academic
- Alice Baker (veteran) (1898–2006), British World War I service veteran
- Alice Baker (set decorator), American set decorator
- Alison Baker (writer) (born 1953), American short story writer
- Alison Baker (racewalker) (born 1964), Canadian racewalker
- Allan Baker, Australian rapist and murderer
- Almaria Baker, American politician
- Amanda Baker (born 1979), American actress
- Andrea Baker, American actress
- Andre Baker (wrestler) (1964–2010), British professional wrestler
- Anita Baker (born 1958), Grammy Award-winning American rhythm & blues singer-songwriter
- Ann Baker (1930–2017), American actress
- Anna P. Baker (1928–1985), Canadian visual artist
- Anne Elizabeth Baker (1786–1861), philologist and illustrator of Northampton, England
- Annie Baker (born 1981), American playwright
- Anthony St. John Baker (1785–1854), British diplomat and naval officer
- Arcadia Bandini de Stearns Baker (1827–1912), Californio landowner
- Arnie Baker (born 1953), Canadian cyclist, coach and writer
- Art Baker (disambiguation)
- Arthur Baker (disambiguation), multiple people
- Ashley Baker (born 1990), English goalkeeper
- Augustine Baker (1575–1641), Welsh Benedictine monk and ascetical writer

== B ==
- Barney Baker (1911–1990), American mobster
- Bart Baker, American entertainer, singer, and comedian
- Ben or Benjamin Baker (disambiguation), multiple people
- Bernard Baker (disambiguation), multiple people
- Berniece Baker Miracle (1919–2014), née Baker, American writer and half-sister of actress Marilyn Monroe
- Betsey Metcalf Baker (1786–1867), née Metcalf, American manufacturer of straw bonnets, entrepreneur, and social activist
- Betsy Baker (supercentenarian) (1842–1955), British–born American supercentenarian
- Betsy Baker (born 1955), American actress
- Billy or Bill Baker (disambiguation), multiple people
- Blake Baker (born 1982), American football coach
- Blanche Baker (painter) (1844–1929), British artist
- Bobby or Bob and Bobby Baker (disambiguation), multiple people
- Brad Baker (baseball) (born 1980), American baseball pitcher
- Brad Baker (motorcyclist) (born 1993), American motorcycle racer
- Brian Baker (disambiguation), multiple people
- Britt Baker (born 1991), American professional wrestler
- Bruce Baker (disambiguation), multiple people, multiple people
- Bryan Baker (racing driver) (born 1961), American NASCAR driver
- Bryan Baker (fighter) (born 1985), American mixed martial artist
- Bryan Baker (baseball) (born 1994), American baseball player
- Buck Baker (1919–2002), American NASCAR driver
- Budda Baker (born 1996), American football player
- Buddy Baker (1941–2015), American NASCAR driver, son of Buck Baker
- Buddy Baker (composer) (1918–2002), American composer who scored many Disney films

== C ==
- Caleb Baker (1762–1849), American politician
- Carl Baker (boxer) (born 1982), English boxer
- Carl Baker (born 1982), English footballer
- Carroll Baker (born 1931), American actress
- Carroll Baker (singer) (born 1949), Canadian country singer and songwriter
- Charlie or Charles Baker (disambiguation), multiple people
- Cheryl Baker (born 1954), British singer and television presenter
- Chet Baker (1929–1988), American jazz musician
- Chilton C. Baker (1874–1967), American politician
- Chris or Christopher Baker (disambiguation), multiple people
- Chuck Baker (born 1952), Major League Baseball infielder
- Cis Baker (fl.1920s), English footballer
- Claire Baker (born 1971), Scottish Labour Party politician
- Clarence Baker (1928–1989), Canadian politician
- Clement Baker (by 1470–1516), English politician
- Clive Baker (footballer, born 1934) (1934–2012), English footballer
- Clive Baker (footballer, born 1959), English footballer
- Colin Baker (disambiguation), multiple people
- Colson Baker (born 1990) aka Machine Gun Kelly, American rapper and actor
- Conrad Baker (1817–1885), 15th governor of Indiana
- Conway Baker (1911–1997), American football player
- Corey Baker (baseball) (born 1989), American baseball player
- Corey Baker (choreographer), New Zealand choreographer
- Cyril Baker (1885–1949), English cricketer

== D ==
- D'Arcy Baker (1877–1932), British businessman and racing driver
- Dale Baker (1939–2012), Australian politician
- Dallas Baker (born 1982), American footballer
- Dan, Danny or Daniel Baker (disambiguation), multiple people
- Darius Baker (1845–1926), Justice of the Rhode Island Supreme Court
- Dave or David Baker (disambiguation), multiple people
- Dean Baker (born 1958), American macroeconomist
- Deandre Baker (born 1997), American football player
- Deborah Baker, American biographer and essayist
- Dee Bradley Baker (born 1962), American voice actor
- Del Baker (1892–1973), American baseball player and manager
- Delmon Baker, Trinidad and Tobago politician
- Dennis Baker (disambiguation), multiple people
- Dessie Baker (born 1977), Irish soccer player
- Diane Baker (born 1938), American actress
- Dick Baker (1938–2001), Canadian racing driver
- Doc Baker (died c.early 1920s), American footballer
- Don Baker (musician) (born 1950), Irish musician and actor
- Donald Baker (bishop) (1882–1968), Anglican bishop of Bendigo, Australia
- Donna Baker (born 1966), New Zealand international footballer
- Dorothy Baker (writer) (1907–1968), American writer
- Dorothy Baker (madam) (c. 1916–1973), American madam
- Doug or Douglas Baker (disambiguation), multiple people
- Dusty Baker (born 1949), American Major League Baseball player and manager
- Dylan Baker (born 1959), American actor

== E ==
- E. Ballard Baker (1917–1985), American jurist
- E. C. Stuart Baker (1864–1944), British ornithologist and police officer
- E. D. Baker, American children's novelist
- Earl Baker (1925–1999), American football coach
- Earl M. Baker (1940–2024), American politician
- Edmund Baker (1854–1911), American politician
- Ed, Eddie or Edward Baker (disambiguation), multiple people
- Edwin Baker (disambiguation), multiple people
- Elijah Baker (actor) (born 1991), British actor
- Elijah Baker (preacher) (1742–1798), American preacher
- Elizabeth Baker (disambiguation), multiple people
- Ella Baker (1903–1986), African-American civil rights and human rights activist
- Ellis Baker (died 1984), American theatre actress
- Else Baker (born 1935), Sinti holocaust survivor
- Elsie Baker (1883–1971), American actress and singer
- Eric Baker (activist) (1920–1976), founder of Amnesty International
- Eric Baker (businessman) (born 1973), American businessman, founder and CEO of Viagogo, co-founder of StubHub
- Erica Baker (born 1980), American engineer
- Ethelwyn Baker (1899–1988), British artist
- Etta Baker (1931–2006), American blues musician and guitarist

== F ==
- Fanny Baker Ames née Baker, (1840–1931), American philanthropist and women's rights leader
- Fay Baker (1917–1987), American actress and author
- Florence Baker (1841–1916), Transylvanian-born ethnic Hungarian British explorer
- Francis Patrick Baker (1873–1959), member of the Australian House of Representatives
- Francis Matthew John Baker (1903–1939), member of the Australian House of Representatives
- Frank Baker (disambiguation), multiple people
- Franklin Baker (1846–1923), American entrepreneur
- Franklin Baker (minister) (1800–1867), English Unitarian minister
- Fred or Frederick Baker (disambiguation), multiple people

== G ==
- Gary Baker (disambiguation), multiple people
- Garry Baker (born 1953), Australian rules footballer
- Gavin Baker (born 1988), English cricketer
- Gene Baker (1925–1999), American baseball player
- Geoff or Geoffrey Baker (disambiguation), multiple people
- George Baker (disambiguation), multiple people,
- Gerry Baker (disambiguation), multiple people
- Ginger Baker (1939–2019), English musician, best known for being a member of 60's psychedelic-rock band Cream
- Gladys Baker (1889–1974), English artist
- Gladys Pearl Baker (1902–1984), American film editor, mother of actress Marilyn Monroe and writer Berniece Baker Miracle
- George Pierce Baker (1866–1935), Professor of English at Harvard and Yale and author of Dramatic Technique
- Gordon Park Baker (1938–2002), American-English philosopher
- Grafton Baker (c. 1806–1881), first chief justice of the Supreme Court of the New Mexico Territory
- Graham Baker (footballer) (born 1958), English former footballer
- Graham Baker (director), British film director
- Grant Baker (born 1973), South African surfer
- Grant Baker (businessman) (born 1957), New Zealand businessman
- Greg Baker (born 1968), American actor
- Gregg Baker, American football coach
- Gus Baker (1922–1994), American painter, illustrator and photographer
- Guy Baker, American water polo coach

== H ==
- H. F. Baker (1866–1956), British mathematician
- Hannah Baker (born 2004), English cricketer
- Harriet Baker (1829–1913), American evangelist
- Harriette Newell Woods Baker (1815–1893; pen name, "Aunt Hattie"), American writer
- Harry Baker (disambiguation), multiple people
- Heather Baker (born 1984), American singer, songwriter and guitarist
- Helen Baker (tennis) (fl.1920), American tennis player
- Helen Baker (author) (born 1948), English author
- Henry Baker (disambiguation), multiple people
- Hettie Gray Baker (1880–1957), American film editor
- Herbert Baker (1862–1946), English architect
- Herbert Baker (cricketer) (1880–1958), English cricketer
- Herbert Baker (politician) (1866–1941), Canadian politician
- Herbert Baker (screenwriter) (1920–1983), American screenwriter
- Herbert Brereton Baker (1862–1935), English inorganic chemist
- Herbert F. Baker (1862–1930), American politician
- Herbert G. Baker (1920–2001), British-American botanist
- Herschel Clay Baker (1914–1990), American professor of English literature
- Hilary Baker (1746–1798), Mayor of Philadelphia
- Hobey Baker (1892–1918), American sportsman and pilot
- Horace Baker (politician), acting Governor of New Jersey
- Horace Baker (footballer) (1910–1974), English footballer
- Horace Burrington Baker (1889–1971), American malacologist
- Howard Baker Sr., member of the United States House of Representatives
- Howard Baker (1925–2014), U.S. senator from Tennessee, U.S. ambassador to Japan
- Hugh Baker (disambiguation), multiple people

== I ==
- Iain or Ian Baker (disambiguation), multiple people
- Irene Baker (1901–1994), member of the U.S. House of Representatives
- Irene Baker (botanist) (1918–1989), American botanist

== J ==
- J. N. L. Baker (1893–1971), British geographer
- Jack Baker (disambiguation), multiple people
- Jim or James Baker (disambiguation), multiple people
- Janet Baker (born 1933), English mezzo-soprano
- Janet M. Baker, American scientist
- Javon Baker (born 2002), American football player
- Jeannine Baker, Australian historian
- Jerome Baker (disambiguation), multiple people
- Jerry Baker (disambiguation), multiple people
- Jes Baker, American writer
- Jesse Baker (disambiguation), multiple people
- Jo Baker (disambiguation), multiple people
- Joanna Baker, American professor of ancient languages
- Joe Baker (1940–2003), English footballer
- Joe Don Baker (1936–2025), American actor
- John Baker (disambiguation), multiple people
- Joseph Baker (disambiguation), multiple people
- Josephine Baker (1906–1975), American-French entertainer, French Resistance member and civil rights worker
- Joshua Baker (disambiguation), multiple people
- Julien Baker (born 1995), American singer, songwriter, and guitarist
- Julius Baker (1915–2003), American musician
- Julius Stafford Baker, English cartoonist

== K ==
- Kate Baker (1861–1953), Irish-born Australian teacher
- Kathy Baker (born 1950), American actress
- Kawaan Baker (born 1998), American football player
- Kelly J. Baker (born 1980), American writer and editor
- Kenneth Baker (disambiguation), multiple people
- Kevin Baker (disambiguation), multiple people
- Kieron Baker (born 1949), English footballer
- Kyle Baker, American cartoonist

== L ==
- LaVern Baker (1929–1997), American R&B singer
- Lawrence James Baker (1827–1921), Queen Victoria's Stock-jobber
- Leigh-Allyn Baker, American actress
- Lena Baker (1901–1945), African-American convicted of murder
- Lewis Baker (footballer) (born 1995), English footballer
- Linda Baker (born 1948), American schoolteacher and politician
- Lisa Baker (disambiguation), multiple people, several people
- Lionel Baker (born 1984), West Indian cricketer
- Lynn Baker, American bridge player
- Lynne Rudder Baker, (1944–2017), American philosopher
- Loran Ellis Baker (politician, born 1831) (1831–1899), Nova Scotian businessman
- Loran Ellis Baker (politician, born 1905) (1905–1991), Canadian politician
- Luken Baker (born 1997), American baseball player

== M ==
- Malcolm Baker, (1929–2014), Korean war colonel, founder of Hyrex Pharmaceuticals
- Mark Baker (disambiguation), multiple people
- Martin Baker (disambiguation), multiple people
- Mary Baker (1791–1865), English impostor posing as "Princess Caraboo"
- Matt or Matthew Baker (disambiguation), multiple people
- Mary Baker Eddy (1821–1910), née Baker, American founder of the Church of Christ, Scientist
- Maureen Baker (doctor) (born 1958), Scottish medical doctor, Chair of the Royal College of General Practitioners 2013–2016
- Maureen Baker (fashion designer) (1920–2017), British fashion designer
- Mel Baker, Wales and British Lions rugby player
- Melvin Baker (born 1950), American football player
- Mickey Baker, American guitarist
- Milo Samuel Baker (1868–1961), American botanist
- Mitchell Baker, Indonesian footballer
- Morgan Baker, Australian actor

== N ==
- Newton D. Baker (1871–1937), American mayor of Cleveland, Ohio, and United States Secretary of War
- Nicholson Baker, American author
- Marilyn Monroe (1926–1962), baptized as Norma Jeane Baker, American actress
- Norman Baker (disambiguation), multiple people

== O ==
- Orlando Harrison Baker (1830–1913), American college professor and U.S. consul
- Ox Baker (1934–2014), American professional wrestler and actor

== P ==
- Patricia Baker, American archaeologist
- Paul Baker (disambiguation), multiple people
- Perry Baker (born 1986), American rugby sevens player
- Peter Baker (disambiguation), multiple people

== R ==
- Ray Stannard Baker (1870–1946), American journalist and author
- Reginald Baker (disambiguation), multiple people
- Richard Baker (disambiguation), multiple people
- Robert Baker (disambiguation), multiple people
- Robin Baker (biologist), evolutionary biologist and author of Sperm Wars
- Robin Baker (academic), academic and Vice-Chancellor of Canterbury Christ Church University
- Ron Baker (American football) (born 1954), American offensive lineman
- Ron Baker (basketball) (born 1993), American shooting guard
- Ronald James Baker (1924–2020), Canadian academic administrator
- Ronnie Baker (athlete) (born 1993), American sprinter
- Ronnie Baker (musician) (1947–1990), American bass guitarist and record producer
- Rose Baker, British physicist, mathematician, and statistician
- Roy Baker (disambiguation), multiple people
- Royal N. Baker (1918–1976), United States Air Force flying ace
- Rushawn Baker (born 2003), American football player
- Russell Baker (1925–2019), American writer
- Ruth Baker, British mathematical biologist

== S ==
- Sam Baker (disambiguation), multiple people
- Sara Josephine Baker (1873–1945), American doctor and public health worker
- Sarah Martha Baker (1887–1917), British botanist and ecologist
- Sean Baker (born 1971), American filmmaker
- Seta Baker (born 2001), New Zealand rugby union player
- Simon Baker (racewalker) (born 1958), Australian race walker
- Simon Baker (born 1969), Australian film and television actor
- Stanley Baker (1928–1976), Welsh actor and producer
- Stephen Baker (disambiguation), multiple people
- Steve or Steven Baker (disambiguation), multiple people

== T ==
- Ted Baker (chemist) (born 1942), New Zealand scientist
- Ted Baker (footballer) (1901–1986), Aussie rules footballer
- Ted Baker (publican) (1872–1936), South Australian sportsman* Thomas Baker (antiquarian) (1656–1740), English antiquarian
- Thomas Baker (Alaska politician) (born 1995), American politician
- Thomas Baker (American general) (born 1935), US Air Force general
- Thomas Baker (artist) (1809–1864), English painter
- Thomas Baker (Arundel MP), 17th-century English politician
- Thomas Baker (aviator) (1897–1918), Australian soldier, aviator and flying ace of the First World War
- Thomas Baker (college president) (1871–1939), American college president
- Thomas Baker (cricketer) (born 1981), English cricketer
- Thomas Baker (diplomat) (1639 or 1640 – 1729), English diplomat
- Thomas Baker (dramatist) (1680–1749), English dramatist and lawyer
- Thomas Baker (entomologist), American entomologist
- Thomas Baker (mathematician) (1625–1689), English mathematician
- Thomas Baker (mayor of Plymouth) (died 1926), English politician
- Thomas Baker (Medal of Honor) (1916–1944), US Army Medal of Honor recipient
- Thomas Baker (missionary) (1832–1867), British Methodist missionary
- Thomas Baker (musician) (c. 1820 – 1888), English composer
- Thomas Baker (Peasants' Revolt leader), 14th-century English rebel leader
- Thomas Baker (Royal Navy officer) (1771–1845), Officer of the Royal Navy
- Thomas Baker (Unitarian) (1810–1886), English Unitarian minister
- Thomas Barwick Lloyd Baker (1807–1886), English ornithologist
- Thomas Durand Baker (1837–1893), British Army lieutenant-general
- Thomas E. Baker, American law professor
- Thomas Guillaume St Barbe Baker (1895–1966), British fascist
- Thomas Nelson Baker Sr. (1860–1941), American philosopher
- Thomas Southey Baker (1848–1902), English sportsman
- Tina Baker (born 1958), English author, broadcaster, journalist, and fitness professional
- Tina Baker (died 2002), English murder victim
- Tom Baker (born 1934), English actor and writer
- Tom Baker (1930s pitcher) (1913–1991), American baseball player
- Tom Baker (1960s pitcher) (1934–1980), American baseball player
- Tom Baker (American actor) (1940–1982), American actor
- Tom Baker (bowler) (born 1954), American ten-pin bowler
- Tom Baker (footballer, born 1905) (1905–1975), English footballer
- Tom Baker (legal scholar) (born 1959), American professor
- Tom Baker (Nebraska politician) (born 1948), American politician
- Tom Baker (priest) (1920–2000), British priest
- Tom or Thomas Baker (disambiguation), multiple people
- Trevor Baker, known as Trevor the Weather, long-serving Welsh TV weatherman
- Troy Baker, American voice actor
- Twyla Baker (October 4, 1976-), president of Nueta Hidatsa Sahnish College

== U ==
- Uiti Baker (born 1992), Cook Islands international rugby league footballer
- Ululani Lewai Baker (1858–1902), Hawaiian high chiefess and Governess of Hawaii
- Ulus Baker (1960–2007), Turkish sociologist and public intellectual

== V ==
- Valentine Baker (1827–1887), British soldier
- Valentine Baker (pilot) (1888–1942), British Armed Forces pilot
- Vanessa Baker (born 1974), Australian diver
- Vernon Baker (1919–2010), United States Army Medal of Honor recipient
- Vin Baker (born 1971), American basketball player and coach
- Vin Baker (golfer) (died 1990), South African golfer
- Vincent Baker, Role-playing game designer
- Vivian Baker, American make-up artist

== W ==
- Walter Baker (Canadian politician) (1930–1983), Canadian politician and lawyer
- Walter Baker (British politician) (1876–1930), British politician
- Walter Arnold Baker (1937–2010), American judge
- Walter M. Baker (1927–2012), American politician
- Walter Ransom Gail Baker (1892–1960), American electrical engineer
- Walter Reginald Baker (1852–1929), Former Secretary of Canadian Pacific Railway
- Warren J. Baker (1938–2022), American academic
- Wayne Baker (American football) (born 1953), American football player
- Wayne Baker (born 1953), American author and academic
- Wayne Baker (footballer) (born 1965), English footballer
- Wendy Baker (born 1964), Canadian field hockey player
- Wesley Baker (1958–2005), American murderer
- Wheeler L. Baker (born 1938), President of Hargrave Military Academy
- Wheeler R. Baker (born 1946), American politician
- Wiki Baker, New Zealand vocalist
- Wilder D. Baker (1890–1975), American Vice admiral
- Wiley Baker, American politician
- Wilfred Baker (1920–2000), British politician
- Will Baker (born 1965), American politician
- William Baker (fashion designer) (born 1973), Fashion designer, stylist, author and theatre director
- William Baker (engineer) (1817–1878), English railway engineer
- William Baker (Kansas politician) (1831–1910), American politician
- William Baker (New York politician) (1795–1871), American lawyer and politician
- William Baker (politician, born 1705) (1705-1770), English merchant and politician
- William Baker (Kent cricketer) (1832–1912), English cricketer
- William Baker (baseball) (1866–1930), American baseball owner
- William Baker (bishop of Norwich) (1668–1732), English churchman and academic
- William Baker (politician, born 1743) (1743–1824), British politician
- William Baker (Lower Canada politician) (1789–1866), Canadian politician
- William Baker (footballer) (1883–1916), English footballer
- William Baker (priest) (1870–1950), Anglican priest
- William Baker (bishop of Zanzibar) (1902–1990), Anglican Bishop of Zanzibar
- William Baker (Surrey cricketer) (1807–1885), English cricketer
- William Baker (Indian Army officer) (1888–1964), British Indian Army general
- William Baker (colonist) (1761–1836), British settler in Australia
- William Baker (printer) (1742–1785), English printer
- William Baker (headmaster) (born 1841), Headmaster of Merchant Taylors' School from 1870 to 1900
- William Baker (Pennsylvania and Indiana politician) (1813–1872), American politician
- William A. Baker (1911–1981), American naval architect and maritime historian
- William Benjamin Baker (1840–1911), American politician
- William Bliss Baker (1859–1886), American artist
- William Clyde Baker Jr. (1904–1966), United States Army officer
- William de Chair Baker (1823–1888), English cricketer and cricket administrator
- William E. Baker (1873–1954), American judge
- William Erskine Baker (1808–1881), British Indian Army officer
- William F. Baker (television) (born 1942), American television executive
- William F. Baker (engineer) (born 1953), American structural engineer
- William George Baker (1885–1960), Canadian politician
- William H. Baker (1827–1911), American politician
- William Leonard Baker (1831–1893), Australian politician
- William Meath Baker (1857–1935), English pottery owner and high sheriff
- William Morrant Baker (1839–1896), English physician and surgeon
- William Mumford Baker (1825–1883), Presbyterian minister and an author
- William O. Baker (1915–2005), American chemist
- William R. Baker (1820–1890), American politician
- William Spohn Baker (1824–1897), American writer, collector, and title examiner
- William T. Baker (born 1956), American residential designer and author
- William Washington Baker (1844–1927), American politician
- William Y. Baker (1829–?), American politician
- Willie Baker, American Piedmont blues guitarist singer and songwriter
- Wilma Baker (1917–2016), American animator
- Wilson Baker (1900–2002), British organic chemist
- Winston Baker (born 1939), Canadian politician
- Wiri Baker (1892–1966), New Zealand cricketer
- Word Baker (1923–1995), American theatre impresario

== Y ==
- Yvan Baker (born 1977), Canadian politician
- Yvette Baker (born 1968), British orienteer
- Yvette Baker (synchronised swimmer) (born 1991), British synchronised swimmer

== Z ==
- Zachary Baker (born 1981), American musician better known as Zacky Vengeance
- Zak Baker (born 2004), English footballer
- Zene Baker, American film editor
- Zoë Baker (born 1976), British swimmer

== Fictional characters ==
- Becky Baker (Degrassi: The Next Generation), in the Canadian television series Degrassi: The Next Generation
- Brian Baker (The Wire), a police officer on the HBO drama The Wire
- Douglas Baker (EastEnders), on the British soap opera EastEnders
- Hannah Baker, in the novel and Netflix series 13 Reasons Why
- Jordan Baker (The Great Gatsby), in the novel The Great Gatsby
- Luke Baker, in Degrassi
- Baker family, a family in the 2017 video game Resident Evil 7: Biohazard
- Paul Baker, in the FX series Adults

== See also ==
- Baker (disambiguation)
- Backer, a Norwegian surname
- Bakker, a Norwegian, Swedish, Danish, or Dutch surname
- Justice Baker (disambiguation), multiple people, various judges with the surname Baker
