= Thomas Baker =

Thomas or Tom Baker may refer to:

== Entertainment ==
- Thomas Baker (dramatist) (c. 1680–1749), English dramatist and lawyer
- Thomas Baker (musician) (c. 1820–1888), English composer and producer of musical stage productions
- Tom Baker (born 1934), British actor who played The Doctor in Doctor Who from 1974 to 1981
- Tom Baker (American actor) (1940–1982), American actor

== Military ==
- Sir Thomas Baker (Royal Navy officer) (1771–1845), British admiral
- Sir Thomas Durand Baker (1837–1893), British general
- Thomas Baker (aviator) (1897–1918), Australian soldier and aviator of the First World War
- Thomas Baker (Medal of Honor) (1916–1944), American World War II Medal of Honor recipient
- Thomas Baker (American general) (born 1935), United States Air Force general

== Politics ==
- Thomas Cheseman (or Thomas Baker, c. 1488–c. 1536), English Member of Parliament for Rye, 1523
- Thomas Baker (Arundel MP) (died 1625), English Member of Parliament for Arundel, 1601
- Sir Thomas Baker (mayor of Plymouth) (died 1926), mayor of Plymouth, England, 1913–1916
- Thomas Guillaume St Barbe Baker (1895–1966), British Fascist
- Tom Baker (Nebraska politician) (born 1948), member of the Nebraska Legislature
- Thomas G. Baker Jr. (1956–2016), member of the Virginia House of Delegates
- Thomas Baker (Alaska politician) (born 1995), Alaska state representative

== Religion ==
- Sir Thomas Baker (Unitarian) (1810–1886), English Unitarian minister and mayor of Manchester
- Thomas Baker (missionary) (1832–1867), English Christian missionary cannibalised in Fiji
- Thomas Nelson Baker Sr. (1860–1941), African-American minister, author and philosopher
- Tom Baker (priest) (1920–2000), English Anglican clergyman

== Sports ==
- Thomas Southey Baker (1848–1902), English amateur rower and footballer
- Tom Baker (footballer, born 1905) (1905–1975), English footballer
- Tom Baker (1930s pitcher) (1913–1991), American Major League Baseball pitcher for the Brooklyn Dodgers and New York Giants
- Tom Baker (1960s pitcher) (1934–1980), American Major League Baseball pitcher for the Chicago Cubs
- George Baker (footballer) (Thomas George Baker, 1936–2024), Welsh footballer
- Tom Baker (bowler) (born 1954), American bowler
- Thomas Baker (cricketer) (born 1981), English cricketer who played for Yorkshire County Cricket Club and Northamptonshire County Cricket Club

== Science and academia ==
- Thomas Baker (mathematician) (c. 1625–1689), English mathematician
- Thomas Baker (antiquarian) (1656–1740), English antiquarian
- Thomas Barwick Lloyd Baker (1807–1886), English educationalist, social reformer, and ornithologist
- Thomas Baker (college president) (1871–1939), American president of Carnegie Mellon University
- Thomas E. Baker, American constitutional lawyer
- R. Tom Baker, Canadian inorganic chemist
- Tom Baker (legal scholar) (born 1959), American law professor at the University of Pennsylvania Law School
- Thomas Baker (entomologist), American entomologist

== Others ==
- Thomas Baker (Peasants' Revolt leader) (died 1381), English landowner
- Thomas Baker (diplomat) (1639/40–1729), English consul in Tripoli
- Thomas Baker (artist) (1809–1864), English landscape painter and watercolourist
- Thomas Baker (1810–1872), founder of Bakersfield, California
- Thomas Henry Baker, founder of T. H. Baker, British luxury jewellery retailer

== Fictional characters ==
- Tom Baker (24 character), a character in the American TV series 24
- DC Tom Baker, a character in the British TV series The Bill
- Tom Baker, protagonist in the 2003 film Cheaper by the Dozen and its sequel

== Other uses ==
- Tom Baker Cancer Centre, a hospital in Canada
- "Tom Baker", a song by Human League on some versions of their album Travelogue
