= Justice Baker =

Justice Baker may refer to:

- Albert C. Baker (1845–1921), chief justice of the Supreme Court of Arizona Territory and an associate justice of the Arizona Supreme Court
- Basil Baker (1871–1941), associate justice of the Arkansas Supreme Court
- Benjamin S. Baker (1850–1945), justice of the Supreme Court of the New Mexico Territory
- Beth Baker (born 1961), associate justice of the Montana Supreme Court
- Darius Baker (1845–1926), associate justice of the Rhode Island Supreme Court
- David Gordon Baker (1884–1958), chief justice of the South Carolina Supreme Court
- David J. Baker Jr. (1834–1899), associate justice of the Supreme Court of Illinois
- David L. Baker (fl. 1970s–2010s), associate justice of the Iowa Supreme Court
- Francis E. Baker (1860–1924), associate justice of the Indiana Supreme Court
- Grafton Baker (c. 1806–1881), chief justice of the Supreme Court of the New Mexico Territory
- Hugh B. Baker (1882–1959), associate justice of the Rhode Island Supreme Court
- James A. Baker (justice) (1931–2008), justice of the Texas Supreme Court
- James Baker (Missouri judge) (1819–1910), associate justice of the Supreme Court of Missouri
- James McNair Baker (1821–1892), associate justice of the Florida Supreme Court
- Joshua G. Baker (1852–1935), associate justice of the Louisiana Supreme Court
- Karen R. Baker (born 1963), associate justice of the Arkansas Supreme Court
- Walter Arnold Baker (1937–2010), associate justice of the Kentucky Supreme Court

Mr Justice Baker may refer to the following judges of the High Court of England and Wales:

- Andrew Baker (judge) (born 1965)
- Jeremy Baker (born 1958)
- Jonathan Baker (judge) (born 1955)

== See also ==
- Judge Philip Baker, a fictional corrupt justice of the Supreme Court of the United States in the 1836 Nathaniel Beverley Tucker novel, The Partisan Leader
- Judge Baker (disambiguation)
