= Gerry Baker (disambiguation) =

Gerry Baker (1938–2013) was an American soccer player (St Mirren, Manchester City, Hibernian, Ipswich Town, Coventry City).

Gerry Baker or Gerald Baker may also refer to:

- Gerry Baker (footballer, born 1938), English footballer (York City)
- Gerry Baker (footballer, born 1939) (1939–2022), English footballer (Bradford Park Avenue)
- Gerald Mauroka Baker (born 1962), American law enforcement officer
- Gerald Baker (bowls) (born 1960), South African bowler
- Gerald Baker, American Independent candidate in the 1976 Iowa Senate election and 1984 United States presidential election in Iowa
- Gerald Baker, American priest suspended from the Roman Catholic Diocese of Owensboro

== See also ==
- Gerard Baker (born c. 1961), editor and opinion writer for The Wall Street Journal
- Gerard Baker (ranger) (born 1953), American National Park Service ranger
- Jerry Baker (disambiguation)
- Jeremy Baker (disambiguation)
- Paul Gerald Baker (1910–1942), United States Navy officer
