= Tim Baker =

Tim Baker may refer to:

- Tim Baker (American football) (born 1977), American football player
- Tim Baker (journalist), Australian journalist
- Tim Baker (musician), Canadian singer-songwriter

== See also ==
- Timothy D. Baker (1925–2013), American professor of international health
- Tim Barker (disambiguation)
- Tom Baker (disambiguation)
