= Walter Baker =

Walter Baker may refer to:

- Walter Arnold Baker (1937–2010), Kentucky legislator and justice of the Kentucky Supreme Court
- Walter Baker (British politician) (1876–1930), British Labour Party politician, MP for Bristol East 1923–1930
- Walter Baker (Canadian politician) (1930–1983), Canadian parliamentarian and lawyer
- Walter Ransom Gail Baker (1892–1960), American electrical engineer
- Walter M. Baker (1927–2012), Maryland State Senator
- Walter Reginald Baker (1852–1929), Canadian businessman
- Walter Thane Baker (born 1931), American track and field athlete
- Walter Baker & Company, an American company that produced chocolate

== See also ==
- Baker (surname)
