= Loran Ellis Baker =

Loran Ellis Baker may refer to:

- Loran Ellis Baker (politician, born 1831) (1831–1899), Canadian businessman and member of the Legislative Council of Nova Scotia
- Loran Ellis Baker (politician, born 1905) (1905–1991), Canadian politician and member of the House of Commons of Canada
