= Horace Baker =

Horace Baker may refer to:

- Horace Baker (politician) (1869–1941), American politician, acting governor of New Jersey
- Horace Baker (footballer) (1910–1974), English footballer
- Horace Burrington Baker (1889–1971), American malacologist
