= Governor Baker =

Governor Baker may refer to:

- Charlie Baker (born 1956), 72nd Governor of Massachusetts
- Conrad Baker (1817–1885), 15th Governor of Indiana
- Horace Baker (1869–1941), Acting Governor of New Jersey, 1910–1911
- Joshua Baker (1799–1885), 22nd Governor of Louisiana
- Nathaniel B. Baker (1818–1876), 24th Governor of New Hampshire
- Sam Aaron Baker (1874–1933), 36th Governor of Missouri
