= Alison Baker =

Alison Baker may refer to:

- Alison Baker (race walker) (born 1964), Canadian racewalker
- Alison Baker (writer) (born 1953), American short story writer
- Alison Burton (1921–2014), married name Baker, Australian tennis player
- Alison Baker (soccer) for Cary Lady Clarets
- Ally Baker (born 1986), American tennis player
