= Paul Baker =

Paul Baker may refer to:

- Paul G. Baker (1910–1942), U.S. Navy recipient of the Navy Cross
- Paul T. Baker (1927–2007), American professor of anthropology
- Paul Baker (footballer) (born 1963), English footballer and football manager
- Paul Baker (cricketer) (born 1968), New Zealand cricketer
- Paul Baker (actor) (born 1967), British theatre actor
- Paul Baker (linguist) (born 1972), British linguist
- Paul Baker (anaesthetist), New Zealand anaesthetist
- USS Paul G. Baker (DE-755), a destroyer escort cancelled in 1944
- USS Paul G. Baker (DE-642), a destroyer escort in commission from 1944 to 1947

== See also ==
- Baker (surname)
