= Harold A. Andrews =

American judge (1889–1958)

Harold A. Andrews (August 26, 1889 – December 8, 1958) was a justice of the Rhode Island Supreme Court from 1956 until his death in 1958.

He graduated from Bowdoin College in 1912 and from Harvard Law School in 1915. He served in the Mexican Border War with the Rhode Island Cavalry in 1916 and in World War I with the 103rd Machine Gun Battalion, 26th Division, from 1917-1919. Andrews served as an Assistant to the United States Attorney General from 1921 until 1926. He was a Law Revision Commissioner and Secretary of the Criminal Law Advisory Commission from 1927 until 1933. Andrews was appointed to the Superior Court on January 9, 1948.

Andrews was a judge of the Rhode Island Superior Court until he was elevated to a seat on the State Supreme Court on January 18, 1956.

Andrews died in Jane Brown Hospital in Providence, following a lengthy illness, at the age of 69.

Political offices
Preceded by Hugh B. Baker	Justice of the Rhode Island Supreme Court; 1956–1958	Succeeded by G. Frederick Frost
