= George Baker (topographer) =

Topographer and historian, born 1781

George Baker (1781–1851), topographer and historian, was a native of Northampton, England.

While a schoolboy, at the age of 13, Baker wrote a manuscript history of Northampton, and from that time he was always engaged in enlarging his collections. His first printed work was A Catalogue of Books, Poems, Tracts, and small detached pieces, printed at the press at Strawberry Hill, belonging to the late Horace Walpole, earl of Orford, London (twenty copies only, privately printed), 1810, 4to. His proposals for The History and Antiquities of the County of Northampton were issued in 1815. The first part was published in folio in 1822, the second in 1826, and the third, completing the first volume, in 1830. This volume contains the subdivisions of Spelho, Newbottle Grove, Fawsley, Wardon, and Sutton. The fourth part, containing the subdivisions of Norton and Cleley, appeared in 1836, and about one-third of a fifth part, containing the subdivision of Towcester, in 1841. At the latter date, 220 of his original subscribers had failed him, and with health and means exhausted he was compelled to bring the publication to a close. His library and manuscript collections were dispersed by auction in 1842, the latter passing into the possession of Sir Thomas Phillipps. Baker's Northamptonshire is, on the whole, as far as it goes, the most complete and systematic of all our county histories. In the elaboration and accuracy of its pedigrees it is unsurpassed. An index to the places mentioned in the work was published at London in 1868.

Baker, who was a unitarian, took a deep interest in various local institutions, and was a magistrate for the borough of Northampton. He was not married. A sister, Miss Anne Elizabeth Baker, was his constant companion for more than sixty years. He died at his residence, Marefair, Northampton, on 12 October 1851.
