= Judge Baker =

Judge Baker may refer to:

- Francis E. Baker (1860–1924), judge of the United States Court of Appeals for the Seventh Circuit
- Harold Baker (judge) (1929–2023), judge of the United States District Court for the Central District of Illinois
- James E. Baker (born 1960), judge of the United States Court of Appeals for the Armed Forces
- John Baker (Indiana politician) (1832–1915), judge of the United States District Court for the District of Indiana
- Kristine Baker (born 1971), judge of the United States District Court for the Eastern District of Arkansas
- M. Miller Baker (born 1962), judge of the United States Court of International Trade
- R. Stan Baker (born 1977), judge of the United States District Court for the Southern District of Georgia
- William E. Baker (1873–1954), judge of the United States District Court for the Northern District of West Virginia

== See also ==
- Justice Baker (disambiguation)
