= Benjamin Baker =

Benjamin Baker may refer to:

- Benjamin Baker (engineer) (1840–1907), English engineer
- Benjamin F. Baker (1862–1927), U.S. Navy sailor and Medal of Honor recipient
- Benjamin Franklin Baker (musician) (1811–1889), American educator and composer
- B. Frank Baker (1864–1939), American businessman and politician
- Benjamin Howard Baker (1892–1987), English athlete
- Benjamin S. Baker (1850–1945), American lawyer and judge
- Ben Baker (politician), member of the Missouri House of Representatives
- Benny Baker (1907–1994), American actor

== See also ==
- Ben Barker (disambiguation)
