= Ian Baker =

Ian Baker may refer to:

- Ian Baker-Finch (born 1960), Australian professional golfer
- Ian Baker (architect) (1923–2010), British architect
- Ian Baker (British Army officer) (1927–2005), British general
- Ian Baker (basketball) (born 1993) American basketball player
- Ian Baker (cinematographer) (born 1947), Australian cinematographer
- Ian Baker (politician) (born 1944), Australian politician and journalist
- Ian Baker (footballer) (born 1955), Australian rules footballer

== See also ==
- Iain Baker (born 1965), musician with Jesus Jones
- Ian Barker (disambiguation)
