= Hugh Baker =

Hugh Baker may refer to:

- Hugh B. Baker (1882–1959), associate justice of the Rhode Island Supreme Court
- Hugh P. Baker (1878–1950), American forester and educator
- Hugh T. Baker (1906–1989), Irish cricketer
- Hugh Cossart Baker Sr. (1818–1859), Canadian banker, businessman, mathematician
- Hugh Cossart Baker Jr. (1846–1931), Canadian businessman, telephone pioneer
