= Ben Barker =

Ben Barker may refer to:

- Ben Barker (racing driver) (born 1991), British racing driver
- Ben Barker (speedway rider) (born 1988), British speedway rider

== See also ==
- Mehdi Ben Barka (1920–1965), anti-French Moroccan nationalist
- Ben Baker (disambiguation)
