= Jerome Baker =

Jerome Baker may refer to:

- Jerome Baker (soccer) (born 1991), Canadian soccer player
- Jerome Baker (artist), American glass blower
- Jerome Baker (American football) (born 1996), American football player

== See also ==
- Jerry Baker (disambiguation)
