= Geoffrey Baker =

Geoffrey or Geoff Baker may refer to:

- Geoffrey Baker (British Army officer) (1912–1980), head of the British Army
- Geoffrey Baker (cricketer) (born 1970), New Zealand cricketer
- Geoffrey Baker (rower), English rower
- Geoff Baker (journalist) (born 1968), Canadian-born journalist
- Geoff Baker (politician) (born 1969), member of the Western Australian Legislative Assembly

== See also ==
- Geoffrey the Baker (died c. 1360), English chronicler
