= Gary Baker =

Gary Baker may refer to:

- Gary Baker (racing driver) (born 1946), former NASCAR driver
- Gary Baker (songwriter) (born 1952), American country music singer and songwriter
- Gary Baker, drummer with the band McCarthy
- Gary Go (Gary Baker, born 1985), British singer, songwriter and producer

== See also ==
- Garry Baker (born 1953), Australian rules footballer
