= Dennis Baker =

Dennis Baker may refer to:

- Dennis Baker (cricketer) (born 1947), Australian cricketer
- Dennis Baker (politician) (1927–2014), American lawyer and politician in Mississippi
- Dennis Baker (rugby league), English rugby league player
