= Doug Baker =

Doug Baker or Douglas Baker may refer to:

- Doug Baker (baseball) (born 1961), American former Major League Baseball player
- Doug Baker (rugby union) (1929–2023), England national rugby union footballer
- Douglas Baker (aviator) (1921–1944), United States Navy pilot and World War II fighter ace
- Douglas Baker (EastEnders), character on EastEnders (2007)
- Douglas M. Baker Jr. (born 1958), American businessman
- Ox Baker or Doug Baker (1934–2014), American professional wrestler
- Doug Baker, columnist for the Portland Oregon Journal
- Doug Baker, voice artist in DragonBlade: The Legend of Lang (2005)

== See also ==
- Baker (surname)
