= Bäcker =

- Language: German

Origin
- Meaning: baker
- Region of origin: Germany

Other names
- Variant form: Baecker
- See also: Backer, Baker (surname)

Bäcker or Baecker is a German surname meaning "baker". Notable people with the surname include:

- Fabian Bäcker (born 1990), German footballer
- Pär Bäcker (born 1982), Swedish ice hockey player
- Ronald Baecker (born 1942), computer scientist
- Rudolf Bäcker (1914–2005), German combat medic during World War II

== See also ==
- Backer
- Becker
- Baker (surname)
