= Elizabeth Baker =

Elizabeth Baker may refer to:

- Elizabeth Baker (playwright) (1876–1962), English playwright
- Elizabeth Baker Bohan (1849–1930), British-born American author, journalist, artist, social reformer
- Bessie Anstice Baker (1849–1914), Australian intellectual and social activist
- E. D. Baker, American children's novelist
- Betsy Baker (born 1955), American actress
- Betsy Baker (supercentenarian) (1842–1955), first listed supercentenarian in the Guinness Book of Records
- Elizabeth Baker (actress), actress in the film The Vision
- Elizabeth Baker (diarist) (c. 1720–c. 1797), English secretary, diarist, and amateur geologist
- Elizabeth Baker (economist) (1885–1973), American economist and academic
- Elizabeth Baker (runner) from America's Finest City Half Marathon
- Elizabeth Gowdy Baker (1860–1927), American portrait painter
- Lisa Baker (Pennsylvania politician), American politician
- Liz Murrill (born Elizabeth Baker), American politician

== See also ==
- Anne Elizabeth Baker (1786–1861), English philologist, historian and illustrator
