= Jeremy Baker (disambiguation) =

Jeremy Baker (born 1958) is a British judge.

Jeremy Baker may also refer to:

- Jeremy Baker, High Sheriff of Bristol, 1771
- Jeremy Baker, character in Revolution (TV series)
- Jeremy Baker, Lambeth Council election, 2006

== See also ==
- Jerry Baker (disambiguation)
- Gerry Baker (disambiguation)
