= Arthur Baker =

Arthur Baker may refer to:

- Arthur Baker (calligrapher) (c. 1930–2016), American calligrapher and typeface designer
- Arthur Baker (producer) (born 1955), American record producer and DJ
- Arthur Slade Baker (1863–1943), British Army officer
- Arthur Baker, character in The Long Walk
- Arthur Baker (discus thrower), American discus thrower, 3rd at the 1926 USA Outdoor Track and Field Championships

== See also ==
- Art Baker (disambiguation)
