= Norman Baker (disambiguation) =

Norman Baker (born 1957) is a British politician.

Norman (or Norm) Baker may also refer to:

- Norman Baker (architect) (1885–1968), American architect
- Norman Baker (explorer) (1929–2017), American explorer, navigator on Ra, Ra II and Tigris
- Norman G. Baker (1882–1958), Controversial medical worker, radio pioneer
- Norman H. Baker (1931–2005), American astrophysicist
- Norm Baker (1923–1989), Canadian basketball and lacrosse player
- Norm Baker (baseball) (1863–1949), Major League Baseball pitcher
- Norm Baker (footballer) (1917–1979), Australian footballer for Essendon
