= Joanna Baker =

American linguist and child prodigy

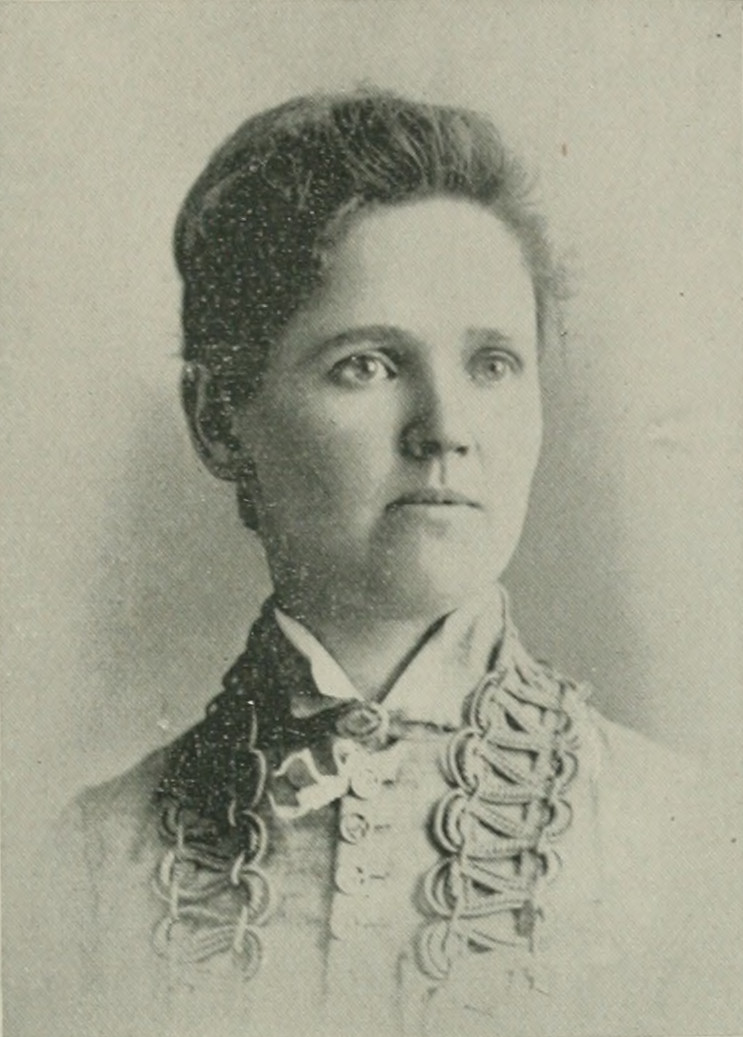
Joanna Baker

Joanna Baker (February 14, 1862 – 1935) was an American linguist and child prodigy, holding her first college teaching job at the age of 16 and publishing her first book of translations from the Greek at the age of 18. For more than a quarter of a century, she was professor of ancient languages at Simpson College in Iowa, and she also taught at Lake Erie College in Ohio.

== Biography ==
Baker was born in New Rochelle, Illinois, one of six children of Mary Catherine (Ridley) Baker and Orlando Harrison Baker, who were both teachers and linguists. They gave her early instruction in languages, for which she had a distinct aptitude. By the time she was four, she was being regularly tutored in Greek, Latin, and French as well as learning English, her native tongue. She later picked up German as well. By the time she was eight, she had read substantial portions of the works of Xenophon, Homer, and Virgil in the original languages.

Around 1870, the family moved to Algona, Iowa, where she subsequently enrolled at Algona College. In 1878, at the age of 16, she was hired as a tutor of Greek at Simpson College in Indianola, a precocious achievement that was remarked on in newspapers across the country. At 18, she published an original translation of Plato's Apology, which was commended by eminent Greek scholars.

In 1881 she enrolled in Cornell College, Iowa, graduating with an A.B. degree in one year. She enrolled in DePauw University in 1886, taking courses in Greek, German, French, and music. After two years of study, during which she also worked as tutor of Greek, she received an A.M. degree. She was immediately hired as an instructor of Latin but stayed for only one year, moving away in 1889 to take up the chair of ancient languages at Simpson College that her father had held twenty years earlier. She held the post for more than a quarter of a century.

She left Simpson College in 1919 to take up the position of professor of Latin and Greek at Lake Erie College in Painesville, Ohio. Little is known of her life beyond this point, apart from the fact that she was still listed as a faculty member at Lake Erie College in 1922.
