= Bruce Baker =

Bruce Baker may refer to:

- Bruce Baker (ice hockey) (born 1956), Canadian ice hockey right winger
- Bruce Baker (footballer) (born 1950), Australian rules footballer
- Bruce Baker (geneticist) (1945–2018), American geneticist
