= Ian Barker =

Ian Barker may refer to:

- Ian Barker (Australian barrister) (1935–2021), Australian barrister
- Ian Barker (jurist) (1934–2022), New Zealand solicitor, judge, and legal scholar
- Ian Barker (sailor) (born 1966), British sailor

== See also ==
- Ian Baker (disambiguation)
