= Backer =

Backer is a surname. Notable people with the surname include:

- Agathe Backer-Grøndahl (1847–1907), Norwegian pianist and composer
- Augustin de Backer (1809–1873), Roman Catholic bibliographer
- Brad Backer (born 1956), Australian rugby league footballer
- Brian Backer (born 1956), American actor
- Cornelis Andries Backer (1874–1963), Dutch botanist
- Deborah Backer (1959–2014), Guyanese politician
- Harriet Backer (1845–1932), Norwegian painter
- Jacob Adriaensz Backer (1609–1651), Dutch painter
- Lars Backer (1892–1930), Norwegian architect
- Marijn Backer (born 1956), Dutch author
- Par Backer (born 1982), Swedish ice hockey player
- P. A. Backer (1940–1993), Malayalam film director

== May also refer to ==
- Backer, somebody who contributed money to a crowdfunding project
- Backer, the name of a VHS-based computer backup system manufactured by Danmere

== See also ==
- Bäcker (Baecker)
- Baker (surname)
- Bakker
- Becker (surname)
- de Backer
