= Steven Baker =

Steven or Steve Baker is the name of:

== Sportsmen ==
- Steve Baker (baseball) (born 1956), major league pitcher
- Steve Baker (footballer, born 1962), English footballer
- Steve Baker (footballer, born 1978), English footballer
- Steve Baker (ice hockey) (born 1957), American ice hockey goaltender
- Steve Baker (motorcyclist) (born 1952), former Grand Prix motorcycle road racer
- Steve Baker (speedway rider) (born 1963), Australian motorcycle speedway rider
- Steven Baker (Australian footballer) (born 1980), Australian rules footballer
- Steven Baker (figure skater), Croatian figure skater, winner of the Golden Bear of Zagreb

== Others ==
- Steve Baker, designer of the Space Crusade boardgame
- Steve Baker (illusionist) (1938–2017), American comedian, magician and escape artist
- Steve Baker (politician) (born 1971), British Conservative Party MP for Wycombe
- Steven Baker (producer) (born 1976), Australian arranger, orchestrator and record producer

== See also ==
- Stephen Baker (disambiguation)
