= Daniel Baker =

Daniel Baker may refer to:

- Daniel Baker (businessman), American CEO of FlightAware
- Danny Baker (born 1957), British writer and broadcaster
- Danny Baker, Sinn Fein politician
- Daniel Baker (Presbyterian minister) (1791–1857), Princeton-educated missionary who founded Austin College and Daniel Baker College
- Daniel A. Baker (born 1979), English artist and producer of alternative comics
- Daniel C. Baker (1816–1863), Massachusetts politician and former mayor of Lynn, Massachusetts
- Daniel L. Baker, murder victim of Herman Ashworth
- Daniel N. Baker (born 1947), American space scientist
- Dan Baker (PA announcer) (born 1946), American public address announcer
- Dan Baker (rugby union) (born 1992), Welsh rugby union player
- Dan Baker (Home and Away), fictional character on the Australian soap opera Home and Away
- Dan Baker, or Scanner, a character in the comic book Strikeforce: Morituri
- Daniel Baker, comedian known as Desus or Desus Nice
