= Colin Baker (disambiguation) =

Colin Baker (born 1943) is a British actor.

Colin Baker may also refer to:

- Colin Baker (Irish footballer) (born 1985), Irish footballer, also known as Colin Scanlan
- Colin Baker (Welsh footballer) (1934–2021), Welsh footballer, played for Cardiff City
