= Kenneth Baker =

Kenneth, Ken or Kenny Baker may refer to:

- Kenneth F. Baker (1908–1996), American professor of plant diseases
- Kenny Baker (American performer) (1912–1985), American radio singer and actor
- Kenny Baker (trumpeter) (1921–1999), British jazz trumpeter
- Kenny Baker (fiddler) (1926–2011), American bluegrass fiddler with Bill Monroe
- Kenneth Baker (Jesuit) (1929–2026), American Roman Catholic priest
- Kenny Baker (English actor) (1934–2016), played R2-D2 in Star Wars
- Ken Baker (trade unionist) (1924–2002), British trade unionist
- Kenneth Baker, Baron Baker of Dorking (born 1934), British Conservative politician
- Ken Baker (footballer) (born 1944), Australian rules footballer
- Ken Baker (entertainment journalist) (born 1970), American TV entertainment journalist
- Kenneth Baker (Metal Gear), fictional character
- Ken Baker, member of Unicorn (English band)

== See also ==
- Ken Barker (born 1948), Australian Roman Catholic priest
