= Gus Baker =

American painter

- Baker in his Nashville studio circa 1960

Gus Lafayette Baker (May 10, 1922 – May 16, 1994) was a painter, illustrator, photographer and lecturer.

== Early life ==
Baker was born May 10, 1922, in Winchester, Tennessee, as the son of Thomas Murrell Baker and Nora Wright. He attended Central High School in Winchester, where he served as an art illustrator for the school yearbook his senior year. After graduating in 1940, he enrolled at the University of the South in Sewanee, but after several years the Second World War interrupted his education. He served in the U.S. Army and spent time in the European Theater.

After the war, Baker returned to the University of the South where he majored in philosophy. He was deeply influenced by Dr. John M. S. McDonald, Professor of Philosophy. He was also a music major, and for a while seriously debated a career as a pianist. He graduated magna cum laude in 1947 with a B.A. degree in Philosophy.

== Art education ==
In 1938, aged sixteen, Baker met another Winchester artist, Avery Handly (1913-1958). Though some nine years older, Handly helped shape his perceptions, criticized, and shared his insights in literature and music. Through his encouragement and mentoring Baker chose a career in the arts. He later studied art at the Dallas Museum of Fine Arts, Southern Methodist University and the Art Institute of Chicago. He spent four years at the Atlanta Art Institute, obtaining the degrees of B.F.A., 1952, and M.F.A., 1953. There he was rated “the star” of the school and awarded the Ellen S. Booth scholarship for advanced studies in painting at Cranbrook Academy of Art, Michigan. He later studied at the Fine Arts Center of Colorado Springs.

== Artistic career ==
In 1955 Baker came to Nashville, Tennessee to teach art at Watkins Institute. He later taught at the University of Tennessee, Cheekwood Botanical Garden and Museum of Art and Tennessee State University. Besides being a popular art teacher, Baker continued to create. He expressed himself in many different styles ranging from touches of cubism and expressionism to impressionistic scenes sometimes bordering on pointillism.

In 1960 Baker was honored as Nashville Artist of the Year by the Davidson County Business and Professional Women's Club for his work in organizing a memorial exhibition for his longtime friend and mentor, Avery Handly.

Baker won numerous honors for his work and exhibited at the University of the South, 1950; Dallas Museum of Fine Arts, 1950; Virginia Intermont Competition, 1953; the High Museum of Art in Atlanta, 1953; University of Tennessee, 1958; Tennessee State Fair, 1958, 1959; Vanderbilt University, 1962; and the Parthenon (Nashville), 1960, 1979. But perhaps his most memorable work is the 63 stained glass windows he designed for the Thomas P. Phillips Memorial Library and Archives in Nashville.

His work is widely represented in private collections as well as the permanent collections at the Cheekwood Botanical Garden and Museum of Art, the Tennessee State Museum, the Dallas Museum of Art, and the Southern Methodist University.

In 1985 he retired from teaching and died May 16, 1994. He is buried in the Baker family plot in Winchester.

In 1996 a memorial retrospective of Baker’s work was held at Belmont University in Nashville.
