= Tim Barker =

Tim Barker may refer to:

- Tim Barker (rugby union) (born 1981), Irish rugby union footballer
- Tim Barker (priest) (born 1956), Anglican priest
