= Ethelwyn Baker =

British artist (1899–1988)

Ethelwyn Mary Baker
- Born: 1899; Belfast, Ireland
- Died: 1988 (aged 88–89)
- Education: Slade School of Fine Art; Royal Academy Schools
- Known for: Sculpture, painting

Ethelwyn Mary Baker (1899–1988) was a British artist, known as a sculptor, painter and commercial artist. She designed and sculpted figures for Royal Worcester which were produced in porcelain, as well as designing shop mannequins. Her sculptures were exhibited widely, including at the Royal Academy, the Royal Society of British Sculptors, the Walker Art Gallery in Liverpool, the American Institute of Architecture and at the Festival of Britain. Baker was an elected member of the Society of Industrial Artists.

== Biography ==
Baker was born in Belfast and her parents were Hannah and Alfred Rawlings Baker, an artist. She studied art in London, first at the Slade School of Fine Art and then at the Royal Academy Schools from 1924 to 1929.

Baker worked as an assistant to the sculptor Charles Sargeant Jagger during the 1920s and 1930s. During the 1930s Baker established a studio in St John's Wood in London which she used until the late 1950s when she moved to Portman Close, by Portman Square. Throughout her career, Baker produced sculptures and statuettes in stone, wood and clay and also painted watercolours. She designed and sculpted figures for Royal Worcester which were produced in porcelain. Baker also designed shop mannequins for department stores. Baker's sculptures were shown at the Royal Academy during the 1930s, and later with the Royal Society of British Sculptors, at the Walker Art Gallery in Liverpool and at the American Institute of Architecture. She also exhibited works at the Cooling Galleries, the Beux Arts Gallery, with the Artists' International Association, at the Festival of Britain and at the National Eisteddford of Wales in 1926. Baker was an elected member of the Society of Industrial Artists.

Baker married the composer Robert F. Cox in 1943. Four of her artworks are held in the University of Reading Collection.
