= Reginald Baker =

Reginald Baker may refer to:

- Reginald Baker (film producer) (1896–1985), British film producer
- Reginald Tustin Baker (1900–1966), English organist and composer
- Snowy Baker (Reginald Leslie Baker, 1884–1953), Australian sportsman, sports promoter and actor
- Reg Baker (1899–1977), Australian rules footballer
