= Jerome Baker (artist) =

American glass artist

Jason Harris
- Other name: Jerome Baker
- Occupation: Glassblower
- Known for: Founding Jerome Baker Designs
- Website: jeromebaker.com

Jason Harris, also known as Jerome Baker, is an American glassblower and the founder of Jerome Baker Designs, a company that makes glass bongs and other smoking implements. He is the subject of "Bong Voyage", a documentary directed by Todd Kapostasy for the 2026 Hulu anthology series 4x20: Quick Hits.

== Career ==
Harris studied glassworking under Bob Snodgrass. He founded Jerome Baker Designs, which produced glass smoking implements.

In 2003, Harris was arrested as part of Operation Pipe Dreams, a federal investigation targeting businesses selling drug paraphernalia.

In 2018, Jerome Baker Designs created "Bongzilla", a 24-foot (7.3 m) bong displayed at the Cannabition Cannabis Museum in Las Vegas. The piece was made in Seattle and transported to Las Vegas for assembly.

== Documentary coverage ==
Harris's career is the subject of "Bong Voyage", directed by Todd Kapostasy and released as part of Hulu's 4x20: Quick Hits in 2026. The documentary uses a bong as its narrator and covers Harris's glassworking business and his arrest during Operation Pipe Dreams.
