= Mark Baker =

Mark Baker may refer to:

- Mark Baker (animator) (born 1959), British animator
- Mark Baker (author) (born 1985), British author of books on houses in Wales
- Mark Baker (basketball) (born 1969), Dayton Jets head basketball coach and former Ohio State University player
- Mark Baker (drummer), drummer for Ministry
- Mark Baker (Australian politician) (born 1958), Liberal Party Member of the Australian House of Representatives
- Mark Baker (Mississippi politician) (born 1962), member of the Mississippi House of Representatives
- Mark Baker (linguist) (born 1959), American linguist, investigating polysynthetic languages, like Mohawk
- Mark Baker (actor) (1946–2018), American stage and film actor
- Mark Baker (Wyoming politician), American politician in the Wyoming House of Representatives
- Mark Baker (bowler), American bowler

== See also ==
- Mark Linn-Baker (born 1954), American actor and director
