= Jerry Baker =

Jerry Baker may refer to:

- Jerry Baker (author) (1931–2017), American author, entrepreneur, public speaker and product spokesperson
- Jerry Baker (announcer), American sports announcer
- Jerry Baker, see Custody battle for Anna Mae He
- Jerry Baker (American football) (born 1960), American football player

== See also ==
- Gerry Baker (disambiguation)
- Jeremy Baker (disambiguation)
- Jerome Baker (disambiguation)
