= Sam Baker =

Sam or Samuel Baker may refer to:

== Arts and entertainment ==
- Samuel Burtis Baker (1882–1967), American artist and teacher
- Samuel Henry Baker (1824–1909), English artist
- Sam Baker (actor) (1907–1982), American actor in Jungle Mystery
- Sam Baker (musician) (born 1954), American folk musician from Texas
- Sam Baker (writer) (born 1966), British writer and former editor-in-chief of Cosmopolitan
- Samiyam (Sam Baker, born 1984), American hip hop producer

== Sports ==
- Sam Baker (kicker) (1930–2007), American football player
- Sam Baker (offensive tackle) (born 1985), American football player
- Sam Baker (Australian footballer) (1874–1946), Australian rules footballer

== Others ==
- Samuel Baker (divine) (died 1660), English clergyman
- Sam Aaron Baker (1874–1933), American politician and governor of Missouri
- Samuel Baker (died 1778), bookseller and founder of Sotheby's
- Sir Samuel Baker (1821–1893), English explorer

== See also ==
- Samuel Baker House (disambiguation)
