= William Baker (Surrey cricketer) =

English cricketer

Personal information
- Full name: William Danby Baker
- Born: 4 January 1807; Kennington, Surrey, England
- Died: 4 March 1885 (aged 78); Lambeth, Surrey, England
- Relatives: George Earnshaw (son)

Domestic team information
- Years: Team
- 1847–1851: Surrey

Career statistics
Competition	First-class
Matches	7
Runs scored	118
Batting average	9.83
100s/50s	0/0
Top score	22
Catches/stumpings	2/–
- Source: Cricinfo, 7 April 2013

William Danby Baker (4 January 1807 – 4 March 1885) was an English cricketer. Baker's batting style is unknown. He was born at Kennington, Surrey.

Baker made his first-class debut for the Surrey Club against the Marylebone Cricket Club at Lord's in 1846. The following year he made his debut for Surrey against the Marylebone Cricket Club at Lord's, as well as playing a second match against the same opposition in that season. His next appearance in first-class cricket came for Surrey against an England XI in 1850, with him playing in the same fixture in 1851. He made a further first-class appearance in 1851 for the Surrey Club against the Marylebone Cricket Club, before making a final appearance in the same fixture in 1853. In his seven appearances in first-class cricket, Baker scored a total of 118 at an average of 9.83, with a high score of 22.

He died at Lambeth, Surrey on 4 March 1885.
