= Bruce Baker (footballer) =

Australian rules footballer

Personal information
- Full name: Bruce Baker
- Born: 13 March 1950 (age 76); Tatura
- Original team: Tatura
- Height: 200 cm (6 ft 7 in)
- Weight: 86 kg (190 lb)
- Position: Ruck

Playing career^{1}
Years	Club	Games (Goals)
1969–70	Fitzroy	16 (4)
- ^{1} Playing statistics correct to the end of 1970.

Bruce Baker (born 13 March 1950) is a former Australian rules footballer who played with Fitzroy in the Victorian Football League (VFL). Bruce left Fitzroy in 1971, playing a season for Camberwell in 1972, before moving onto Surrey Hillis in 1973 where he played until he retired in 1977 at the age of 27 due to injury.
