= Martin Baker =

Martin Baker may refer to:

- Martin-Baker, a British manufacturer of aircraft ejection seats
- Martin Baker (footballer) (born 1974), Scottish footballer
- Martin Baker (organist) (born 1967), English organist
- Martin Baker, candidate in the United States House of Representatives elections in Missouri, 2010 and 2014
