= Gregg Baker =

American football coach

Current position
- Title: Head coach
- Team: Redland MS (AL)
- Record: 7–1

Coaching career (HC unless noted)
- 2006–2007: Alabama Christian Academy (AL)
- 2008: Faulkner (RCG/OL)
- 2009–2011: Faulkner
- 2013–2014: Montgomery Catholic Prep (AL)
- 2015–2016: Highland Home HS (AL)
- ?–?: Wetumpka HS (AL) (assistant)
- ?–present: Redland MS (AL)

Head coaching record
- Overall: 8–23 (college); 14–45 (high school)

Gregg Baker is an American football coach. He is an assistant football coach at Wetumpka High School in Wetumpka, Alabama. Baker served as was the head football coach at Faulkner University in Montgomery, Alabama from 2009 to 2011, compiling a record of 9–23. He resigned in November 2011 and was succeeded by Faulkner athletic director Brent Barker. Baker joined the football coaching staff at Faulker in 2008 as running game coordinator and offensive line coach.

== Head coaching record ==
=== College ===
Year	Team	Overall	Conference	Standing	Bowl/playoffs
Faulkner Eagles (Mid-South Conference) (2009–2011)
2009	Faulkner	2–9	0–6	7th (West)	
2010	Faulkner	3–7	2–4	T–5th (West)	
2011	Faulkner	3–7	1–5	T–6th (West)	
Faulkner:		8–23	3–15		
Total:		8–23			
