= Roy Baker =

Roy Baker may refer to:

- Roy Baker (footballer) (born 1954), English association football player
- Bullet Baker (Roy Marlon Baker, 1901–1961), American football player
- Roy Thomas Baker (1946–2025), British music producer
- Roy Ward Baker (1916–2010), British film director, also credited as Roy Baker
- Roy Baker (politician) (born 1945), American politician from Nebraska
