= Jesse Baker =

Jesse Baker may refer to:

- Jesse Baker (American football) (Jesse Lewis Baker; 1957–1999), American football player
- Jesse Baker (shortstop) (Michael Myron Silverman; 1895–1976), American baseball player
- Jesse Baker (pitcher) (Jesse Ormond Baker; 1888–1972), American baseball player
- Jesse Matlack Baker (1854–1913), American politician

== See also ==
- Jessica Baker, member of the Florida House of Representatives
