= Geoffrey Baker (cricketer) =

New Zealand cricketer (born 1970)

Personal information
- Full name: Geoffrey Robert Baker
- Born: 30 July 1970 (age 56); Invercargill, New Zealand
- Batting: Right-handed
- Role: Wicket-keeper

Domestic team information
- Years: Team
- 1991/92–1992/93: Wellington
- 1993/94: Otago
- 1994/95: Wellington
- FC debut: 1 February 1992 Wellington v Otago
- Last FC: 14 March 1995 Wellington v Auckland
- LA debut: 27 December 1993 Otago v Canterbury
- Last LA: 20 February 1995 Wellington v South Africans

Career statistics
Competition	First-class	LA
Matches	17	25
Runs scored	394	326
Batting average	19.70	23.28
100s/50s	0/1	0/1
Top score	53	59*
Catches/stumpings	49/5	28/8
- Source: CricInfo, 1 January 2022

Geoffrey Robert Baker (born 30 July 1970) is a New Zealand former cricketer. He played first-class cricket for Otago and Wellington between the 1991/92 and 1994/95 seasons.
