= Helen Baker (author) =

English author

Helen Baker (born 18 April 1948 in England) is an English author.

Baker studied economics at the University of York before obtaining a bilingual secretarial certificate from the City of London College and a Certificate of Education from Wolverhampton Technical Teachers' College. She is best known for her books concerning personal finance, particularly Money Matters For Women (1993) published by Penguin, later updated as Wealth For Women (2005): Another major theme in her work is Teaching English as a Foreign Language in such books as Teaching A Frenchman English - In and Out of Bed (2011) and English - Laugh And Learn (2006).

More recently she has written eight novels based on Jane Austen's books, continuations like Playfulness (2008), a continuation of Jane Austen's Mansfield Park, completions like The Brothers By Jane Austen And Another Lady (2011) and a complete revamping like Miss Jane Austen's Lady Susan – Revived (2010). She has also published many travelogues, drawing on her own experience as an expatriate.

== Biography ==
Baker's first published book Money Matters For Women (1993) draws on her experiences as a qualified Inspector of Taxes in the public sector and as a technical taxation manager in the private sector as well as later in the New Zealand academic world, as a lecturer in taxation, both direct and by correspondence,

Baker studied at the University of York, obtaining a BA (with honours) in 1969. She immediately started on a post-graduate bilingual secretarial course, at the City of London College. She received a Certificate of Education from Wolverhampton Technical Teachers' College while working as an economics lecturer. Baker went on to join the British Civil Service as a Direct Entrant at the Department of Inland Revenue. She spent four years there as an Inspector of Taxes. From 1979 to 1986 she was Technical Taxation Manager with a firm of Chartered Accountants. She moved to New Zealand in 1986 and worked as a taxation lecturer at the Technical Correspondence Institute the local equivalent to Britain's Open University.

Apart from her Regency Romances, Baker's fictional works tend to feature the same locale in Southern France where she had been living for over twenty years.

== Bibliography ==
=== Fiction ===
- Connivance — 2007
- Maria – Jane Austen's Northanger Abbey Continued — 2011
- Miss Jane Austen's Lady Susan – Revived — 2010
- Playfulness — 2008
- Precipitation – A Continuation of Miss Jane Austen's Pride And Prejudice — 2010
- The Book of Ruth — 2006
- The Brothers By Jane Austen And Another Lady — 2009
- The Substitute Bride — 2005
- The Watsons By Jane Austen And Another Lady — 2008
- The Wordlecombe Angel — 2001
- Woman Out To Grass — 2001

=== Non-fiction ===
- Comfort — 2006
- Donald Baker Countryman — 2005
- English - Laugh and Learn — 2006
- Far South with Koninklijke Luchtvaart Maatschappij — 2006
- Going For Gold – The Expatriate's Financial Handbook — 1994
- How To Thrive On A Quarter Of Your Income — 1994
- Money Matters For Women — 1993
- North East and Far East in 2007 — 2008
- Sin City For the Over-Sixties Bogota 2011 — 2011
- Teaching A Frenchman English – In and Out of Bed — 2008
- The Land of the Long White Lie — 2006
- The Man Who Was Born Too Late — 2000
- Wealth For Women — 2006
- Two Lost Souls in Seoul 2011 — 2011
- Under The Rainbow — 2009
- My French Garden — 2012
