= Benjamin Franklin Baker (musician) =

American educator and composer

- Born: July 10, 1811; Wenham, Massachusetts, U.S.
- Died: March 11, 1889 (aged 77); Boston, Massachusetts, U.S.
- Occupations: Composer, singer, educator, author
- Spouse: Sabra L. Heywood

Benjamin Franklin Baker (July 10, 1811 – March 11, 1889) was an American educator and composer.

== Biography ==
Benjamin Franklin Baker was born on July 10, 1811, in Wenham, Massachusetts, to John and Sally Baker. When he was 14 years old, his family moved to Salem, Massachusetts, where he began his musical studies.

In 1833 he began his professional music career while touring as a singer. After this he moved to Bangor, Maine, for a time, making a living as a businessman, but moved to Boston in 1837. With his cousin Isaac Baker Woodbury, he began a series of teacher's conventions.

Beginning in 1839, he spent the next 24 years in Boston in the capacity of music conductor for various churches there. Baker succeeded Lowell Mason as music teacher in the Boston Public School system in 1841. That same year he married Sabra L. Heywood. He became music director at the Federal Street Church in Boston, where he taught voice lessons. During this time period, he continued performing, often as featured soloist with the Handel and Haydn Society.

In 1851 he founded his own music school, where he directed the vocal classes and served as the principal. The school prospered until he retired in 1868. By the late 1850s he was traveling to other parts of the United States as a conductor. Towards the end of his career in the 1870s, Baker was the editor of the Boston Music Journal. He died on March 11, 1889, in Boston without having any children.

== Style and influence ==
Baker taught music lessons seeking to promote "effective harmony" and ease of execution when performing music, yet he tried to avoid music that was "commonplace or trivial". His teaching as well as musical compositions focused mainly on vocal music, with an emphasis on sacred music and pedagogy. His compositions were performed during his lifetime not only in the population centers surrounding Boston, but also in small communities wishing to showcase "ambitious" works.

Gilbert Chase, commenting strictly on the music of The Burning Ship, stated it was of no "particular distinction". This cantata used a theme, common at the time for "genteel" presentations, of introducing mother and child to extreme peril and subsequently concluding with an obligatory happy ending using a plot of divine intervention.

== Publications ==
Baker published more than 25 collections of hymns, songs, and music theory books. Among them:

- A Book of Songs and Hymns with Isaac Baker Woodbury (1838)
- The Boston Educational Society's Collection with Isaac Baker Woodbury (1842)
- Baker's American School Music Book (1844)
- The Choral with Isaac Baker Woodbury (1845)
- Baker's Theory of Harmony (1847)
- Elementary Music Book (1850)
- Haydn Collection of Church Music with L. H. Southard (1850)
- Melodia Sacra with A. N. Johnson and Josiah Osgood (1852)
- Baker's Church Music (1855)
- Baker's Theoretical and Practical Harmony: Including a Complete Classification of Intervals, Common Chords, Discords, iatonic and Fundamental Harmonies, Suspensions, and Passing Notes; With a Treatment of Thorough Bass, the Affinity of Chords, Modulation, and Pedal Point (1870)

== Compositions ==
Baker composed numerous anthems, hymns, and other various vocal works. Of particular note are his cantatas.

- The Storm King (1856)
- The Burning Ship – cantata with lyrics by Howard M. Ticknor. (1858)
- Camillus, the Roman Conqueror (1865)
