= Gerry Baker (footballer, born 1939) =

English footballer (1939–2022)

Personal information
- Date of birth: 22 April 1939
- Place of birth: South Hiendley, Yorkshire, England
- Date of death: December 2022 (aged 83)
- Place of death: Burnley, Lancashire, England
- Position: Full back

Youth career
- Bradford Park Avenue

Senior career*
Years	Team	Apps	(Gls)
1957–1961	Bradford Park Avenue	16	(0)
- King's Lynn
- * Club domestic league appearances and goals

Gerald Baker (22 April 1939 – December 2022) was an English professional footballer born in South Hiendley, then in Hemsworth Rural District, Yorkshire, who played as a full back in the Football League for Bradford Park Avenue. Baker died in Burnley, Lancashire in December 2022, at the age of 83.
