= Ian Baker (footballer) =

Australian rules footballer

Personal information
- Full name: Ian William Baker
- Born: 4 August 1955 (age 71)
- Original team: Redan
- Height: 185 cm (6 ft 1 in)
- Weight: 86 kg (190 lb)

Playing career^{1}
Years	Club	Games (Goals)
1976–1979	St Kilda	50 (3)
1980	Richmond	3 (0)
Total		53 (3)
- ^{1} Playing statistics correct to the end of 1980.

Ian William Baker (born 4 August 1955) is a former Australian rules footballer who played with St Kilda and Richmond in the Victorian Football League (VFL).

Baker, a half-back, started his VFL career at St Kilda, where he had come to from Redan. He had his best season in 1977 when he played 21 games and earned eight Brownlow Medal votes. After four league seasons at St Kilda, Baker crossed to Richmond and made three home and away appearances for his new club in the 1980 VFL season, a premiership year. He didn't play any more senior football for Richmond and would end up back in the Ballarat Football League. Baker coached North Ballarat Roosters to premierships in the 1980s. A hard but respected coach.

He was the inaugural coach of TAC Cup side the North Ballarat Rebels in 1993.
