= Algona College =

Former college in Iowa

Coordinates: 43.07°N 94.23°W

- Type: Private
- Active: 1869–1875
- Religious affiliation: Methodist
- President: Orlando Harrison Baker (1871-1875)
- Location: Algona, Iowa, United States

Algona College was a private Methodist college located in Algona, Iowa. It operated from 1869 to 1875.

== History ==
The college was affiliated with the Methodist Episcopal Church. From 1871 to 1875, its president was the classicist Orlando Harrison Baker.

Iowa historian, Harvey Ingham, wrote a history of the college in 1925. He reported that the college's closure was due to financial difficulties caused by a plague of locusts. Families in the region could not support the college when their crop yields were too low to sustain their own families. According to Ingham, the Upper Des Moines newspaper mentioned on March 10, 1875, that Congress had allocated $150,000 to buy seed grain for the farmers in the affected areas of Kansas, Nebraska, Iowa, and Minnesota. Ingham concluded that "it is easy to see that soliciting for college endowments was not an encouraging prospect in the grasshopper years.

Another factor contributing to the college's closure was the community's disagreement over the licensing of saloons in what was formerly a "dry" county.

In December 1872, the college newspaper, the "Algona Collegian", reported the following tuition rates:

- Common English: $6.00
- Higher English, Latin, and Greek: $8.00
- French or German: (not listed)
- Incidental Fee: $1.00
- Instrumental Music: $10.00
- Use of Instrument for Practice: $2.00

Board (lodging) was available with families in the community for $2.00 to $3.00 per week.

== See also ==
- List of colleges and universities in Iowa
