= Ted Baker (publican) =

Edward Baker (1872 – 12 July 1936) was a publican and racehorse owner and breeder in South Australia.

== History ==
Baker was the fourth son of Amos Baker (died 1916) of Towitta, South Australia.

He was a highly regarded cricket and football player, an excellent shot with a rifle, and fine athlete, having won several hurdles and "Sheffield Handicap" (Note: "Sheffields" were sprint races over 130 yards (less often 125 or 85 yards) with valuable prizes and heavy on-course betting. The races attracted hundreds of "pedestrians" competing in heats leading to the final race of four to six contenders.) races.

He became licensee of the Bath Hotel, Norwood in March 1901, and ran it profitably to 1926, living at the Globe Hotel, Kensington of which his wife was licensee. He also had the Bedford Hotel, Woodside, which he also relinquished in 1926, having decided to concentrate on racehorse breeding, having already had several notable successes. Around 1911 Baker began horse racing with Alarm, who won the 1911 Alderman Cup, and Pendulus and later Peace Day, the progeny of Pendulus, who won the Goodwood Handicap in 1921. He became a committee member of the Licensed Victuallers' Racing Club. Buoyed by such successes, and more interested in breeding than racing, he sold up his hotel interests and opened a stud at Salisbury, which he named Erin Vale. He imported the mare Stormy Day and the Hurry On horse Prestongrange, who sired Preston Lad and Preston Day. Moongarra was another likely thoroughbred emerging from the stud.

Baker did not enjoy the expected success in the blood horse market — several dry seasons had resulted in a depression in the racing industry, as had a Government clampdown on racecourse gambling.

He returned to hotel management in 1934, with the John Bull Hotel, Currie Street, Adelaide, to his last year.

Baker died at a private hospital in College Park.

== Family ==
Baker married Gertrude Constance Harrold (1888– ) on 20 October 1910. They had at least one son:

- Horace Lancelot Baker (14 January 1918 – )

She married again in April 1938, to Dr Alfred Alexander Smith (c. 1863 – 17 September 1939), his second wife. She was later licensee Grenfell Hotel Grenfell Street, Adelaide, forfeited 1944.
