= Patricia Baker =

American archaeologist and academic

Patricia "Patty" Baker FSA
- Born: 1967 (age 58–59)
- Occupations: Archaeologist; Academic

Academic background
- Thesis: Medical Care for the Roman Army on the Rhine, Danube and British Frontiers from the First through Third Centuries AD (2000)

Academic work
- Discipline: Archaeology
- Institutions: University of Kent

Patricia Anne Baker FSA is an American archaeologist and academic. She is head of the Department of Classical & Archaeological Studies at the University of Kent and Senior Lecturer in Classical & Archaeological Studies.

== Career ==
Baker has MA degrees in Classics from Florida State University and in Roman Frontier Studies from Newcastle University. She gained her PhD in Classics in 2000, also from Newcastle University, on the topic of 'Medical Care for the Roman Army on the Rhine, Danube and British Frontiers from the First through Third Centuries AD'.

Baker is the series editor of the Medicine and the Body in Antiquity series, published by Routledge.

She was elected as a fellow of the Society of Antiquaries of London on 16 February 2006.

== Select publications ==
- Baker, P. A., Nijdam, H., and van't Land, K. (eds) 2011. Medicine and Space: Body, Surroundings and Borders in Antiquity and the Middle Ages (Visualising the Middle Ages 4). Brill, Leiden. ISBN 978-90-04-21609-9
- Baker, P. 2013. The Archaeology of Medicine in the Greco-Roman World. New York, Cambridge University Press. ISBN 978-0-521-194327
- Baker, P. 2016. 'Medicine'. In: Millett, M., Revell, L. and Moore, A. (eds). The Oxford Handbook of Roman Britain. Oxford, Oxford University Press. 555-572. ISBN 978-0-19-969773-1
- Baker, P. 2017. 'Viewing Health: Asclepia in their Natural Settings'. Religion in the Roman Empire 3, 143-163.
- Baker, P. 2018. 'Identifying the connection between Roman Conceptions of ‘Pure Air’ and Physical and Mental Health in Pompeian Gardens (c. 150 BC-AD 79): A Multi-Sensory Approach to Ancient Medicine'. World Archaeology [Online].
