= Arthur Slade Baker =

British Army officer

Brigadier-General Arthur Slade Baker CMG
- Born: 13 December 1863
- Died: 3 September 1943 (aged 79)
- Military career
- Allegiance: United Kingdom
- Branch: British Army
- Service years: 1882–1920
- Rank: Brigadier-General
- Unit: Royal Artillery
- Conflicts: Second Boer War; First World War
- Awards: Companion of the Order of St Michael and St George

Brigadier-General Arthur Slade Baker, CMG (13 December 1863 – 3 September 1943) was a senior British Army officer during the First World War.

== Military career ==
Born on 13 December 1863, Arthur Slade Baker was educated at Bedford School. He received his first commission as a second lieutenant in the Royal Artillery in 1882, was promoted to the rank of lieutenant on 1 October 1882, to captain on 1 October 1891, and to major on 1 April 1900.

He served during the Second Boer War in South Africa between 1900 and 1901.

In June 1902 he was appointed as Inspector, General Stores division, of the Army Ordnance Department, serving at Woolwich until 1905. He was deputy assistant director at the War Office between 1908 and 1912. He was promoted to the rank of Lieutenant Colonel in January 1912 when he was made an ordnance officer, 2nd class.

He served during the First World War, and was promoted to the rank of brigadier general.

Baker was appointed a Companion of the Order of St Michael and St George in 1915.

He was promoted to the honorary rank of brigadier general in January 1918 and retired from the British Army in 1920.

He died at the age of 79 on 3 September 1943.
