= Joshua Baker (disambiguation) =

Joshua Baker (1799–1885) was an American plantation owner and military governor of Louisiana.

Joshua Baker may also refer to:

- Josh Baker (musician) British DJ and Producer
- Joshua Baker (journalist) (fl. 202), British journalist
- Joshua Baker (Mississippi politician) (1763–1816), American merchant and militia officer
- Joshua G. Baker (1852–1935), American lawyer and Louisiana state judge
