= Art Baker =

Art Baker may refer to:

- Art Baker (actor) (1898–1966), American film, television and radio actor
- Art Baker (American football coach) (1929–2024), American football coach
- Art Baker (gridiron football) (born 1937), former American football player

== See also ==
- Arthur Baker (disambiguation)
