= William Baker (printer) =

English printer (1742–1785)

William Baker (1742–1785), was an English printer.

== Biography ==
Baker was born at Reading in 1742, and was the son of William Baker, for more than forty years schoolmaster at that place, and an amiable and accomplished man. Even at an early age young Baker's close application to study injured his health. His father had hoped to devote him to the church, but being disappointed by Dr. Bolton, dean of Carlisle, who had promised to give the youth a university training, he apprenticed him to Mr. Kippax, a printer, of Cullum Street, London. Baker diligently applied himself to his calling, and still employed his leisure in self-improvement. The money earned by working overtime was spent in books. Before he was twenty-one years old his exertions produced severe illness. On the death of Kippax, Baker succeeded to his business, afterwards removing to Ingram Court, where he was in partnership with John William Galabin.

In 1770 he published Peregrinations of the Mind, a series of twenty-three essays, after the style of the Rambler, and upon such subjects as the stage, love, happiness, war, patriotism, cruelty, the unreasonable compliments paid to the ancients for their works, &c. It had always been his practice to note passages which struck his attention in the course of reading, and in 1783 he printed a little volume of short extracts, noticeable for beauty of language or elevation of thought, from a wide range of Greek and Latin authors. No special arrangement is observed, but the precision of the references gives the book a value usually absent in such compilations. He contributed some poetical pieces to the magazines, and is said to have written sermons for clerical friends. He was an excellent linguist and good classical scholar.

His modesty and learning made him many friends among the leading antiquaries and men of letters of the day, including Oliver Goldsmith, Dr. Edmund Barker, James Merrick, Hugh Farmer, and Caesar de Missy. He left in manuscript a correspondence with another Reading worthy, Robert Robinson, author of Indices in Dion. Longinum, in Eunapium, et in Hieroclem (Oxon. 1772), besides many other letters on points of Greek scholarship. A small unfinished treatise on abuses of grammatical propriety in ordinary conversation also remained imprinted. His limited but choice library of classical books ultimately became the property of John Coakley Lettsom.

About Christmas 1784 he suffered from over-exertion in walking, and after an illness of nine months died from 'an enlargement of the omentum' on 29 September 1785, in his forty-fourth year. He was buried in the vault of St. Dionis Backchurch, the parish in which he had lived when in London. A Latin inscription to his memory was placed by his younger brother upon the family tomb in the churchyard of St. Mary, Reading.

His works are:

1. Peregrinations of the Mind through the most general and interesting subjects usually agitated in life, by the late W. Baker, printer. A new edition, to which is prefixed a biographic memoir of the author. London, printed by the editor [Maurice], 1811. The first edition was in 1770.
2. Theses Græcæ et Latinæ selectæ. Lond. in off. J. W. Galabin et W. Baker, 1783.
