= Kevin Baker =

Kevin Baker may refer to:

- Kevin Baker (author) (born 1958), American novelist and journalist
- Kevin Baker (ice hockey) (born 1979), Canadian ice hockey player
- Kevin Baker, character in the 1993 science fiction novel Beggars in Spain by Nancy Kress
- Kevin Baker, two characters in the Australian soap opera Home and Away

== See also ==
- Kevin Barker (born 1975), retired Major League Baseball first baseman
