= Doc Baker =

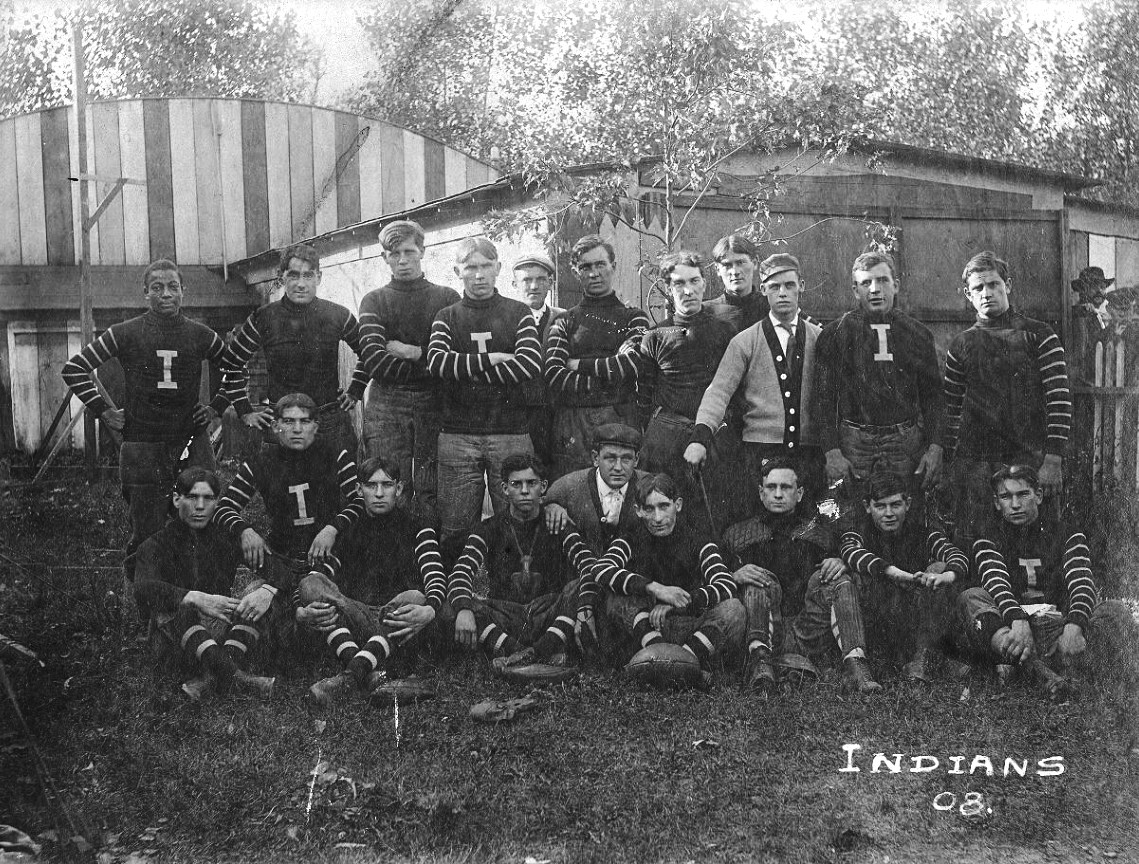
- The 1908 Akron Indians, Baker is the first player in the back row, left side.

Profile
- Position: Halfback

Personal information
- Born: Unknown
- Died: c. early 1920s

Career information
- College: None

Career history
- Akron Indians (1906–1908, 1911)

Charles "Doc" Baker was an early professional American football halfback for the Akron Indians of the "Ohio League" from 1906 to 1908. He returned to the team for one last season in 1911. He was the second-ever African American to play professional football, the first being Charles Follis. Baker, earned his nickname, "Doc", while serving as an aide to a physician in Akron, Ohio. He also was a target of opponents trying to injure him. Although Baker was never implicated, his football experience was marred by several gambling scandals. According to a 1911 article the Canton Repository, Baker was involved in just about every offensive and defensive play during a game between the Akron Indians and the Canton Professionals (who were later renamed the Canton Bulldogs in 1915) According to the Repository write-up; “Halfback Baker, from appearances a second Jack Johnson, was Akron’s best man. He was in every play both on offense and defense and seemed impervious to injury. On several occasions he was thrown hard, with several others on top of him. But he always came up smiling. His plunges through and outside of tackle were the best ground-gainers for the Akron team,”

Very little is known of his life outside of football. However, it is known that he was raised in the Akron Children's Home, an orphanage, and is believed to have died in the early 1920s.
