= Cyril Baker =

English cricketer

Cyril Baker (1885–1949) was an English cricketer who played for Northamptonshire between 1906 and 1922, although he only appeared in four first-class matches in that time. He was born in Northampton on 22 November 1885 and died there on 8 October 1949. Baker appeared in four first-class matches as a righthanded batsman who bowled right arm medium pace. He scored 17 runs with a highest score of 7 and took 11 wickets with a best performance of three for 38.
