= Rose Baker =

British statistician

- Title: Professor emeritus

Academic background
- Education: University of Cambridge

Academic work
- Discipline: Physics; Mathematics; Statistics
- Sub-discipline: Applied statistics
- Institutions: Salford Business School; Rutherford Appleton Laboratory

Rose Dawn Baker is a British physicist, mathematician, and statistician. She is a professor emeritus of applied statistics in the Salford Business School at the University of Salford.

== Education and career ==
Baker read physics at the University of Cambridge, earned a master's degree there in 1968, and completed her Ph.D. in 1972. Her dissertation concerned bubble chambers.

After a year in India as a lecturer in physics at the Indian Institute of Technology Bombay, she returned to England as a researcher at the Rutherford High Energy Laboratory in Chilton, Oxfordshire, where she worked from 1973 to 1977.

At that time, as she writes, "funds began drying up in big physics", so she moved to the University of Salford, where she worked in computing services from 1977 to 1990. In 1990, she became a lecturer in the department of mathematics at Salford, and in 1998 she moved to statistics as a reader. She was given a personal chair in 2001, and retired in 2013.

== Recognition ==
Baker is a fellow of the Royal Statistical Society and a fellow of the Institute of Mathematics and its Applications. She is also an elected member of the International Statistical Institute. She has won the Catherine Richards Prize of the Institute of Mathematics and its Applications twice, in 2002 for a paper on paradoxes in probability theory and in 2010 for her work providing a formula for the health effects of obesity, as a function of body mass index.
