= Stephen Baker =

Stephen Baker may refer to:

- Stephen Baker (American football) (born 1964), football player
- Stephen Baker (animal behaviorist) (1921–2004), animal behaviorist and humorist of Austrian origin
- Stephen Baker (Australian politician) (born 1946), former South Australian House of Assembly politician
- Stephen Baker, American banker and president of the Bank of the Manhattan Company
- Stephen Baker (New York politician) (1819–1875), U.S. representative
- Stephen D. Baker, colonel in the 6th New York Heavy Artillery Regiment (1862–1865)
- Stephen L. Baker (born 1955), journalist and author of the non-fiction book The Numerati

== See also ==
- Steven Baker (disambiguation) for Steven Baker or Steve Baker
