= Gerry Baker (footballer, born 1938) =

English footballer

Personal information
- Full name: Gerard Baker
- Date of birth: 16 September 1938 (age 88)
- Place of birth: Wigan, England
- Position: Full back

Senior career*
| Years | Team | Apps | (Gls) |
| 1957–1958 | Bolton Wanderers | 0 | (0) |
| 1958–1959 | Wigan Athletic | 47 | (0) |
| 1959–1963 | Nottingham Forest | 0 | (0) |
| 1963–1968 | York City | 214 | (7) |
- * Club domestic league appearances and goals

Gerard Baker (born 16 September 1938) is an English former footballer who made more than 200 appearances in the Football League for York City. His career ended following a cartilage injury, his last game was on 7 December 1968. On 20 October 1969 he enjoyed a testimonial game when York City played The Happy Wanderers (the club's 1954–55 FA Cup semi final side).

He started his career with Bolton Wanderers before joining his hometown club Wigan Athletic, where he made played 47 games in the Lancashire Combination.
