= Cis Baker =

English footballer

Personal information
- Full name: Cecil Baker
- Place of birth: Darnall, West Riding of Yorkshire, England
- Positions: Left back; inside right

Senior career*
Years	Team	Apps	(Gls)
- Beighton
- Eckington Athletic
1920	Blackpool	2	(0)
- Creswell Colliery
1925	Chesterfield	2	(0)
- Shirebrook
- Beighton Miners Welfare
- * Club domestic league appearances and goals

Cecil "Cis" Baker (born in Darnall, West Riding of Yorkshire) was an English footballer. He began his professional career with Blackpool in 1920, making two League appearances for the team.
