= Lisa Baker =

Lisa Baker may refer to:

- Lisa Baker (Australian politician) (born 1958)
- Lisa Baker (Pennsylvania politician)
- Lisa Baker, Playboy Playmate of the Month for November 1966, and Playmate of the Year for 1967
- Lisa Baker, Australian arts administrator, on the board of the Music Australia Council
