= Orlando Harrison Baker =

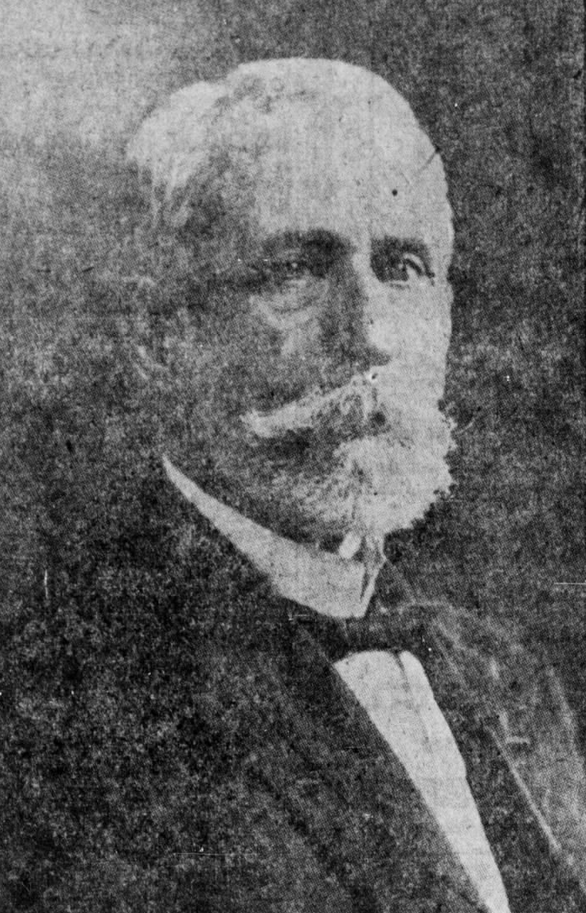
- Born: September 16, 1830; Union County, Indiana
- Died: August 6, 1913 (aged 82); Nagasaki, Japan
- Education: Indiana Asbury University
- Occupations: Professor, consul
- Employers: Simpson College; Algona College
- Spouses: Mary Catherine Ridley (m. 1858; died 1890): Rachel Halton Beach
- Children: 6, including Joanna Baker

Orlando Harrison Baker (September 16, 1830 – August 6, 1913) was a professor of ancient languages at Simpson College in Iowa and the principal of Algona College. He later served as the U. S. consul at posts in Denmark, Australia, and Borneo.

== Life ==
Orlando Harrison Baker was born in Union County, Indiana, the oldest child of Jacob Baker and Mary Baker. He was educated at Mt. Morris Seminary in Illinois and at Allegheny College in Meadville, Pennsylvania. For lack of money he had to drop out of college and go to work as a carpenter, painter, and teacher. He eventually saved up enough to complete his undergraduate degree at Indiana Asbury University (now DePauw University) in 1857. He was ordained a minister around 1858, and he received his M.A. from Indiana Asbury University in 1861.

In 1868, he took up the post of professor of Latin and Greek at Simpson College. In 1871, he moved to Algona College to serve as its president, a position he held until the college closed in 1875. From 1875 to 1877, he served as pastor of churches in Cambridge and Boonsboro, and in 1878 he became the principal of the Boonsboro school system.

In 1879, he moved his family back to Indianola, and the following year he took up the editorship of the Indianola Herald, a position he held until 1886. Following that, he became a traveling correspondent for the Chicago Inter Ocean newspaper until 1892.

Baker next moved into government service as a U.S. consul, first in Copenhagen, Denmark (1893-94) and then Sydney, Australia (1900-08). In 1908, he took up the consulship of Sandakan, North Borneo, where he remained to the end of his life. In 1913, as he was on his way back to the United States on leave, he died on board the U.S. transport Thomas in the harbor at Nagasaki, Japan.

== Family ==
Baker married Mary Catherine Ridley in 1858; she died in 1890 and he remarried, to Rachel Halton Beach. He had six children, four of whom survived to adulthood. His daughters Myra and Joanna also became professors, Myra at Napa College and Joanna at Simpson College.
