= Wayne Baker (footballer) =

English footballer (born 1965)

Personal information
- Full name: Wayne Robert Baker
- Date of birth: 4 December 1965 (age 60)
- Place of birth: Leeds, England
- Height: 6 ft 1 in (1.85 m)
- Position: Goalkeeper

Senior career*
| Years | Team | Apps | (Gls) |
| 1983–198? | Sheffield Wednesday | 0 | (0) |
| 198?–1986 | Whitby Town | | |
| 1986–1987 | Darlington | 5 | (0) |
| – | Frickley Athletic | | |
| – | Guiseley | | |
| – | Altrincham | 4 | (0) |
| – | Farsley Celtic | | |
| – | Harrogate Town | | |
| 1998– | Garforth Town | | |
| –200? | Farsley Celtic | | |
- * Club domestic league appearances and goals

Wayne Robert Baker (born 4 December 1965) is an English former footballer who made five appearances in the Football League playing as a goalkeeper for Darlington. He was on the books of Sheffield Wednesday without representing them in the league, and played non-league football for clubs including Whitby Town, Frickley Athletic, Guiseley, Altrincham (two Alliance Premier League matches in each of the 1992–93 and 1993–94 seasons), Farsley Celtic (two spells), Harrogate Town, and Garforth Town.
