= Norman Baker (architect) =

American architect

Norman B. Baker (1885 – 1968) was a prominent New York architect who worked with the firms of George B. Post and Sons, Delano & Aldrich, and Harrison & Abramovitz.

His work included the design and supervision of construction on major landmarks in New York City. These include Rockefeller Center, the Daily News Building, the United Nations Building, Lincoln Center, and Oheka Castle. Baker also designed and built many Colonial-style buildings on Long Island. His thoughts on the use of Colonial style in 20th century homes were incorporated in his book Early Houses of New England.
