= Earl Baker =

American football and track coach (1925–1999)

Biographical details
- Born: March 22, 1925; Marshall, Missouri, U.S.
- Died: September 30, 1999 (aged 74); Maryville, Missouri, U.S.

Playing career

Football
- 1946–1949: Missouri Valley
- Position: Guard

Coaching career (HC unless noted)

Football
- 1960–1962: Northwest Missouri State
- 1963–1969: Northwest Missouri State (assistant)

Track and field
- 1962–1973: Northwest Missouri State

Head coaching record
- Overall: 7–20 (football)

Earl Henry Baker (March 22, 1925 – September 30, 1999) was an American football and track and field coach. He was the 11th head football coach at Northwest Missouri State University in Maryville, Missouri, serving for three seasons, from 1960 to 1962, and compiling a record of 7–20. Baker was also the head track and field coach at Northwest Missouri State from 1962 to 1973. He died at the age of 74, on September 30, 1999, at his home in Maryville.

== Head coaching record ==
=== Football ===
Year	Team	Overall	Conference	Standing	Bowl/playoffs
Northwest Missouri State Bearcats (Missouri Intercollegiate Athletic Association) (1960–1962)
1960	Northwest Missouri State	5–4	3–2	3rd	
1961	Northwest Missouri State	2–7	0–5	6th	
1962	Northwest Missouri State	0–9	0–5	6th	
Northwest Missouri State:		7–20	3–12		
Total:		7–20			
