= Darius Baker =

American judge (1845–1926)

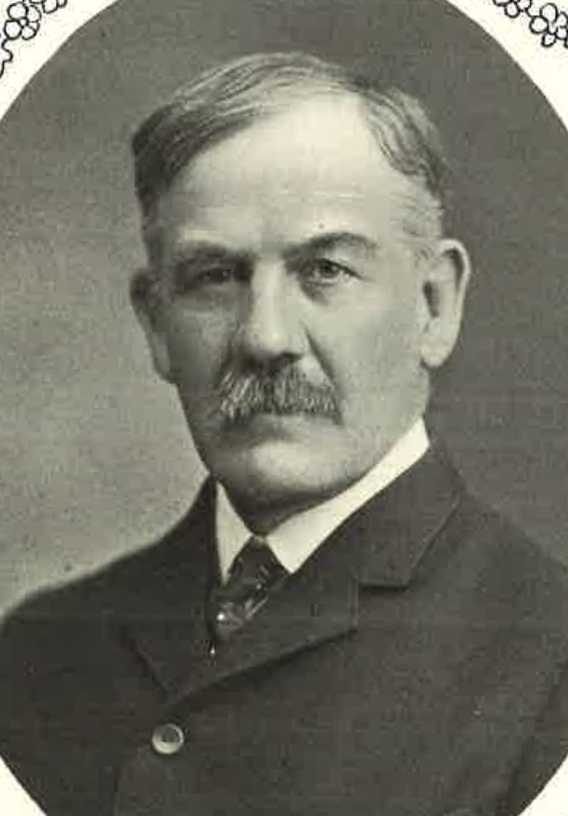
Judge Darius Baker, prior to his appointment to the Supreme Court

Darius Baker (January 18, 1845 – March 19, 1926) was a justice of the Rhode Island Supreme Court from 1913 to 1919.

Born in Yarmouth, Massachusetts, to Braddock Baker and Caroline (Crowell) Baker, he was educated in the public schools of Yarmouth, and served in the Union Army in the American Civil War, as a private in the 5th Regiment, Massachusetts Volunteer Militia, from 1862 to 1863, in North Carolina. He attended Providence Conference Seminary, in East Greenwich, Rhode Island, and Wesleyan University, in Middletown, Connecticut, graduating in 1870. He gained admission to the bar in Connecticut in 1874, and entered the practice of law in Newport, Rhode Island, in 1875, where he became "one of the leading citizens of that community".

Baker was a probate judge from 1877 to 1898, and also became a Justice of District Court of First Judicial District in 1886. He served in this capacity until his appointment to the state supreme court in 1913, where he remained until 1919.

Baker was twice married and had five children, including a son, Hugh B. Baker, who also became a judge of the Rhode Island Supreme Court. Politically, Baker was a Republican. Baker died at a hospital in Newport, Rhode Island, at the age of 81.
