= Grafton Baker =

American judge (c. 1806–1881)

Grafton Baker (c. 1806 – October 1881) was the first chief justice of the Supreme Court of the New Mexico Territory, serving from 1851 to 1853.

Born in Tennessee, Baker moved to Natchez, Mississippi in his young adulthood, representing Jackson County, Mississippi, in the Mississippi Legislature in 1848 and 1849. He was a leading member of the Whig Party.

In 1851, President Millard Fillmore appointed Baker to be the first regular chief justice of the Supreme Court of the New Mexico Territory. The Weekly Mississippian observed that "Baker, in the canvass of 1848-9, contended, on the stump, that the lex loci of our Mexican territory would prevail, despite the Constitution; and we have no doubt his appointment was made with that view of tho question".

Despite Baker's legal acumen, he "demonstrated an amazing lack of diplomacy in dealing with his associates and experienced difficulty in maintaining the dignity of his office in matters of personal decorum", including an "incident of indiscreet conduct on his part" that led to "a serious breach in relations between the early judiciary and papal dignitaries, particularly Bishop Lamy". After the end of his two year term, President Franklin Pierce chose to appoint James J. Deavenport to Baker's position on the court. Baker returned to Mississippi for a time, moving to Memphis, Tennessee, in 1857.

Baker died in Washington County, Missouri, at the age of 75. At the time, he was described as "the oldest practitioner in the Mississippi Bar".
