= Thomas Barwick Lloyd Baker =

English ornithologist (1807–1886)

Thomas Barwick Lloyd Baker (14 November 1807 – 10 December 1886) was an English educationalist, social reformer, and ornithologist.

== Life ==
Lloyd Baker was born in 1807, the only son of Thomas John Lloyd Baker (died 1841) of Hardwicke Court, Gloucestershire, and of Mary, daughter of William Sharp of Fulham, and niece of Granville Sharp. Like his father, Baker went to Eton and to Christ Church, Oxford, where he matriculated in 1826 but did not graduate. He entered at Lincoln's Inn in 1828, qualified as a magistrate for Gloucestershire in 1833, and soon afterwards became a visiting justice at the county prison of Gloucester. On succeeding his father at Hardwicke Court in 1841, he took an active part in the administration of other local public institutions, was one of the founders of the Social Science Congresses, started what is known as the Berkshire system for the suppression of vagrancy, was president of the chamber of commerce, and captain of the Gloucestershire squadron of the yeomanry cavalry. As a member of the old high church party, Baker contributed liberally to the restoration of Hardwicke, Uley, and other churches. He was deputy-lieutenant of Gloucestershire, and high sheriff in 1847–8.

Baker's best known work was in connection with the establishment of the Hardwicke reformatory school. The Philanthropic Society and the Refuge for the Destitute had for years done much for the reformation of youthful criminals, and the Philanthropic Society had established a school in London; in 1848, on the advice of the Rev. Sydney Turner, then its superintendent, the Philanthropic Society's school was removed to the Farm school at Redhill, and reorganised on the lines of the French school at Mettray. Baker's attention had been drawn to the question by seeing boys in prison at Gloucester, and by a visit to the Philanthropic Society's school in London. In 1861, the whole question of the treatment of youthful offenders was considered at a conference at Birmingham, promoted by the town clerk, William Morgan, and Joseph Hubback of Liverpool. Among the results of this conference was the establishment of reformatory schools, by private philanthropists, in several places. With the help of George Henry Bengough (1829-1865), Baker opened a school at Hardwicke in March 1852, the first inmates being three young London thieves. The school was at first little more than a labourer's cottage on a small farm on Baker's estate; by 1854 there were seventeen inmates. Bengough, a rich young squire, worked for two years as schoolmaster, living in the house. The first Reformatory Schools Act was passed in 1854, enabling courts to commit to these schools, and the treasury to contribute to their support.

Many particulars of Baker's work are given by Professor von Holtzendorft, who made his acquaintance in 1861, and published a book which was translated by Rosa Gibhard under the title, An English Country Squire, as sketched at Hardwicke Castle. A collection of Baker's papers, contributed to newspapers or read at meetings of the Social Science Association, was after his death edited by Herbert Philips and Edmund Verney in 1889, under the title, War with Crime. This volume contains a reproduction of a portrait of Baker at Hardwicke Court, by G. Richmond, R.A., which was presented to Mrs. Baker by the managers of English reformatories. Most of Baker's work related to the prevention of crime, in youth and in age, and many of the reforms which he advocated have been carried into effect. He urged that crime was due to a form of mental disease, and that the forces against it must be carefully marshalled if success is to be attained. Sentences should be apportioned on a scientific principle, the amount to depend rather on the antecedents of the prisoner than on the heinousness of the particular crime. He thought that, in the interests alike of the criminal and the public, a sentence of imprisonment should be followed by a term of police supervision. He deprecated the erection out of the rates of expensive buildings for reformatories, and held that only confirmed offenders should be sent to such schools.

Baker's health broke down in 1882, and after that year he took no active part in public affairs. He died at Hardwicke on 10 December 1886.

== Family ==
In 1840, he married Mary, daughter of Nicholas Lewis Fenwick of Besford, Worcestershire; they had two sons: Granville Edwin Lloyd Baker (born in 1841, high sheriff of Gloucestershire in 1898) and Henry Orde Lloyd Baker (born in 1842).
