= Thomas Baker (diplomat) =

English diplomat (1639 or 1640 – 1729)

Thomas Baker (1639 or 1640 – 1729) was an English diplomat who was English consul to Tripoli in the mid-1680s and kept a personal "Journall or Memoriall", the manuscript of which is in the Bodleian. Thomas worked as a factor in Algiers and then lived in Tunis in the late 1660s to early 1670s. Later he was appointed consul in Tripoli from 1679 to 1686. He was appointed consul to Algiers in 1691 but left in 1694 to renew his old post in Tripoli in 1694. He returned to England in a ship provided at the expense of the dey of Algiers.

== Bibliography ==
- Dyer, Mark (1990). "Review of Piracy and Diplomacy in Seventeenth-Century North Africa: The Journal of Thomas Baker, English Consul in Tripoli, 1677–1685". The International Journal of African Historical Studies. 23 (2): 330–333. doi:10.2307/219356. ISSN 0361-7882.
- Baker, Thomas (1989). Pennell, C. R. (ed.). Piracy and Diplomacy in Seventeenth-Century North Africa: The Journal of Thomas Baker, English Consul in Tripoli, 1677–1685. United States of America: Fairleigh Dickinson University Press. ISBN 978-0-8386-3302-1.
- Cutter, Nat (10 August 2023). "Baker, Thomas (1639/40–1729), diplomatist and diarist". Oxford Dictionary of National Biography (online ed.). Oxford University Press. (Subscription, Wikipedia Library access or UK public library membership required.)
