= Thomas Baker (cricketer) =

English cricketer (born 1981)

Thomas Michael Baker
- Born: 6 July 1981 (age 44); Dewsbury
- Occupation: Cricketer

Thomas Michael Baker (born 6 July 1981, Dewsbury, Yorkshire, England) is an English cricketer, who played for Yorkshire and Northamptonshire between 2001 and 2005. Baker is a right-handed tail order batsman and right arm fast-medium bowler.

In his solitary first-class appearance, for Northamptonshire against Leicestershire at Grace Road in 2005, Baker scored a duck in his only innings, caught by Darren Maddy off Claude Henderson, and took the wicket of Darren Robinson, caught and bowled for 139, at a match cost of 55 runs.

He played four List A matches for Yorkshire in 2001, three in the Benson & Hedges Cup and one in the National League. He also played for Northamptonshire in a one-day game against the touring Sri Lankans in 2002, and for the Northamptonshire Cricket Board against the Yorkshire Cricket Board in the preliminaries for the Cheltenham & Gloucester Trophy. He took five wickets for 194 in these matches, with a best of 2 for 13 against Derbyshire, at an average of 38.80.

He has not appeared in senior cricket since 2005.
