= Garry Baker =

Australian rules footballer

Personal information
- Born: 24 March 1954 (age 72)
- Original teams: Meeniyan, Leongatha
- Height: 193 cm (6 ft 4 in)
- Weight: 95 kg (209 lb)

Playing career^{1}
Years	Club	Games (Goals)
1972–1973	Footscray	14 (9)
1974–1981	Melbourne	127 (112)
1983	Sydney	6 (5)
Total		147 (126)
- ^{1} Playing statistics correct to the end of 1983.

Career highlights
- Keith 'Bluey' Truscott Medal: 1978

Garry Baker (born 24 March 1953) is a former Australian rules footballer who played for Melbourne, Footscray and Sydney in the Victorian Football League (VFL).

A ruckman, Baker was originally from Meeniyan and started his career at Footscray before moving to Melbourne where he played most of his football.

He won Melbourne's best and fairest in 1978 but struggled in the subsequent seasons due to a knee injury.

In 1983 he joined Sydney who were playing just their second season in the city but he only managed six games.

He later played for and coached both Mordialloc and Moorabbin in the Victorian Football Association.

== Playing statistics ==
Legend
G	Goals	K	Kicks	D	Disposals	T	Tackles
B	Behinds	H	Handballs	M	Marks

Season	Team	No.	Games	Totals							Averages (per game)						
Season	Team	No.	Games	G	B	K	H	D	M	T	G	B	K	H	D	M	T
1972	Footscray	27	1	0	0	3	2	5	1	—N/a	0.0	0.0	3.0	2.0	5.0	1.0	—N/a
1973	Footscray	27	13	9	6	77	22	99	41	—N/a	0.7	0.5	5.9	1.7	7.6	3.2	—N/a
1974	Melbourne	1	20	24	9	201	59	260	116	—N/a	1.2	0.5	10.1	3.0	13.0	5.8	—N/a
1975	Melbourne	1	16	15	9	95	33	128	47	—N/a	0.9	0.6	6.3	2.2	8.5	3.1	—N/a
1976	Melbourne	1	8	9	5	51	20	71	39	—N/a	1.1	0.6	6.4	2.5	8.9	4.9	—N/a
1977	Melbourne	1	17	18	9	131	65	196	85	—N/a	1.1	0.6	7.7	3.8	11.5	5.0	—N/a
1978	Melbourne	1	22	12	5	254	107	361	179	—N/a	0.5	0.3	11.5	4.9	16.4	8.1	—N/a
1979	Melbourne	1	16	11	5	167	120	287	120	—N/a	0.7	0.3	10.4	7.5	17.9	7.5	—N/a
1980	Melbourne	1	16	23	11	116	122	238	87	—N/a	1.4	0.7	7.3	7.6	14.9	5.4	—N/a
1981	Melbourne	1	12	0	0	104	97	201	82	—N/a	0.0	0.0	8.7	8.1	16.8	6.8	—N/a
1982	Sydney	1	6	5	4	22	10	32	13	—N/a	0.8	0.7	3.7	1.7	5.3	2.2	—N/a
Career			147	126	63	1221	657	1878	810	—N/a	0.9	0.4	8.4	4.5	12.9	5.5	—N/a
