= Walter Reginald Baker =

Former Secretary of Canadian Pacific Railway

- Born: May 25, 1852; York, England
- Died: April 2, 1929 (aged 76)
- Occupation: Railway executive
- Years active: 1873–1911
- Employers: Canada Central Railway; Manitoba & Northwestern Railway; Canadian Pacific Railway
- Known for: Railway management in Canada
- Spouse: Jane Cruice (m. 1875)
- Children: 4

Walter Reginald Baker (May 25, 1852 – April 2, 1929) was known for his work with various railway companies in Canada. Born in York, England, he worked seven years with the Allan Steam Ship Company in Montreal (1865-1872). The Montreal Historical Society reports that he followed this with three years as Aide-de-Campe for the Earl of Dufferin, Governor General of Canada (1873-1876), but a March 1902 edition of The Railway and Shipping World indicates that he entered service as a freight and passenger agent for Canada Central Railway in 1873. Subsequently, he held a series of positions with that company:

- February to September, 1881, assistant to General Superintendent and Local Treasurer of the Western Division, A B Stickney;
- September 1881, to May 1882, purchasing agent of the same division;
- May 1882, to June 1883, assistant to the General Manager of Canada Central Railway, W. C. Van Horne;
- June 1883, to September 1892, General Superintendent, Manitoba & Northwestern Railway
- September 1892 to May 1900, General Manager of Manitoba & Northwestern Railway
- May 1900 to 1901, Executive Agent for CPR.

In 1901, he became the Assistant to the Second Vice President in Montreal, and in 1911 he became Secretary of CPR.

Baker married Ottawan Jane Cruice in 1875 and fathered four children, three girls and a boy.

== Arms ==
Coat of arms of Walter Reginald Baker
Crest On a wreath of the colours a boar's head couped Or holding in the mouth a maple leaf. Escutcheon Erminois six maple leaves three two and one slipped Proper on a chief engrailed Azure two boars' heads couped Or. Motto Meglio Tardi Che Mai.

== See also ==
- Retlaw, Alberta, Walter spelled backwards, named in honour of Walter Reginald Baker.
- List of people from Montreal
