= Tom Baker (1960s pitcher) =

American baseball player (1934–1980)

- Relief pitcher
- Born: May 6, 1934; Port Townsend, Washington, U.S.
- Died: March 9, 1980 (aged 45); Port Townsend, Washington, U.S.
- Batted: Left Threw: Left

MLB debut
- August 2, 1963, for the Chicago Cubs

Last MLB appearance
- September 14, 1963, for the Chicago Cubs

MLB statistics
- Win–loss record: 0–1
- Earned run average: 3.00
- Strikeouts: 14
- Stats at Baseball Reference

Teams
- Chicago Cubs (1963)

Thomas Henry Baker (May 6, 1934 – March 9, 1980) was an American left-handed relief pitcher in Major League Baseball who played for the Chicago Cubs in 1963.

== Career ==
In 1954, Baker was signed as an amateur free agent by the St. Louis Cardinals. After years in the Cardinals system, he was drafted by the Kansas City Athletics in the minor league draft in 1959. However, two years later, he was again in the minor league draft, this time being drafted by the Baltimore Orioles. In 1963, Baker was sent to the Washington Senators as part of a conditional deal, but did not stay in Washington long. On March 26, 1963, just about three months after being sent to the Senators, he was sent back to the Orioles and was purchased by the Chicago Cubs about two months later, on May 27, 1963. It was in Chicago where Baker spent the remainder of his career.

Baker made his major league debut on August 2, 1963, with the Cubs at age 29. On that day, he faced only one batter, Willie McCovey, and was pulled after hitting McCovey with a pitch. This made Baker one of the few pitchers to hit the first batter they ever faced. The Cubs won the game 12–11. He played his final major league game for the Cubs on September 14, 1963. During his time in the majors, he was one of four left-handed pitchers on the Cubs staff, the others being Dick Ellsworth, Jim Brewer, and Dick LeMay.

At the time of his retirement, Baker had earned a career earned run average of 3.00. He finished with 18 innings pitched, striking out 14 batters, and playing in a total of 10 games. He allowed 20 hits, 2 home runs, and 7 walks. Baker's lifetime record was 0–1, and came to bat only three times in his career, recording a batting average of .000. His lifetime fielding percentage is 1.000.
