= Tom Baker (legal scholar) =

American professor (born 1959)

Professor Tom Baker
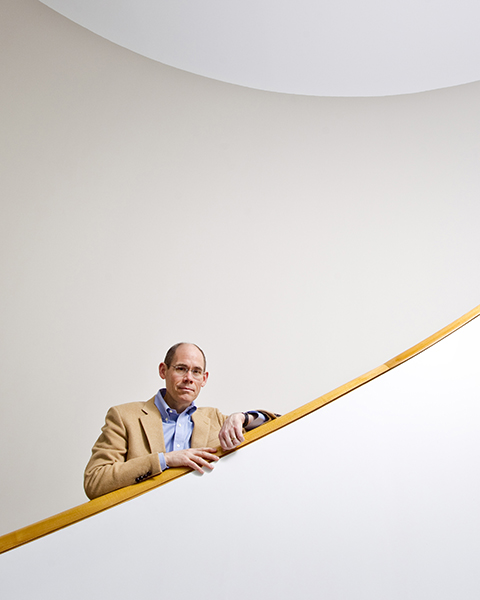
- Tom Baker in 2011

Academic background
- Education: Harvard University and Harvard Law School

Academic work
- Institutions: University of Pennsylvania Law School
- Main interests: Insurance law

Tom Baker (born 1959) is professor of law and a scholar of insurance law at the University of Pennsylvania Law School.

== Education ==
Baker holds both a BA (1982) and a JD (1986) from Harvard University.

== Professional career ==
Baker clerked for Judge Juan R. Torruella of the United States Court of Appeals for the First Circuit. He then practiced with the firm of Covington and Burling in Washington, DC. He served as an Associate Counsel for the Independent Counsel investigating the Iran-Contra affair.

Before joining Penn Law in 2008, he was Connecticut Mutual Professor of Law and director of the Insurance Law Center at the University of Connecticut School of Law. One of his students at UConn Law was future U.S. Senator Chris Murphy.

His research explores insurance, risk, and responsibility in a wide variety of settings, using methods and perspectives drawn from economics, sociology, and history, as well as law.

He is co-founder of the Insurance and Society Study Group, an informal association of scholars from law, humanities and the social sciences who write about risk and insurance. Baker is regularly involved as a consultant in high-stakes insurance projects and litigation.

Baker is the Reporter for the Restatement of the Law, Liability Insurance published by the American Law Institute in 2019.

== Awards ==
2024 Baker was awarded the Harry J. Kalven, Jr. Prize from the Law & Society Association (LSA).

== Books ==
- Embracing Risk: The Changing Culture of Insurance and Responsibility (contributing editor, with Jonathan Simon; 2002)
- Insurance Law and Policy: Cases, Materials, and Problems (2003)
- The Medical Malpractice Myth (2005)
- Ensuring Corporate Misconduct: How Liability Insurance Undermines Shareholder Litigation (Co-Author with Sean J. Griffith; 2010)
- Restatement of the Law, Liability Insurance (Reporter, with Associate Reporter Kyle D. Logue; 2019)
