= Thomas Baker (mathematician) =

English mathematician (1625–1689)

Thomas Baker FRS (1625?–1689) was an English mathematician notable for producing a solution of biquadratic equations.

== Biography ==
Baker is said to have been fifteen years old when he became a battler at Magdalen Hall, Oxford, in 1640. In spite of the puritanical education which, according to Wood, he received at the hall, 'he did some little petite service for his majesty within the garrison of Oxon.' It does not appear what was the nature of the 'little employments' through which, according to the same authority, he became 'minister' of Bishop's Nympton, in Devonshire. He was collated to the vicarage of Bishop's Nympton in 1681; but he seems to have lived for some years previously in that retired spot (perhaps as curate). His secluded life—as much of it at least as could be spared from professional occupations and the cares of a family—was devoted to mathematical studies. He speaks of himself as one 'who pretend(s) not to learning nor to the profession of the mathematic art, but one who(m) at some subcisive hours for diversion sake its study much delights.' He published in 1684 the 'Geometrical Key, or Gate of Equations Unlocked.' Montucla remembers having 'read somewhere' that Baker was imprisoned for debt at Newgate; upon which it was facetiously remarked that it would have been better for him to have had the key of Newgate than that of equations. That same year he was elected a Fellow of the Royal Society.

The leading idea of Baker's work is the solution of biquadratic equations (and those of a lower degree) by a geometrical construction, a parabola intersected by a circle. The method is distinguished from that of Descartes by not requiring the equation to be previously deprived of its second term. The general principle is worked out in great detail; the author being of opinion that conciseness, like 'a watch contrived within the narrow sphere of the signet of a ring,' is rather admirable than useful. Some account of the work is given in the 'Transactions of the Royal Society' (referred to below).

There exists a 'catalogue of the mathematical works of the learned Mr. Thomas Baker, with a proposal about printing the same.' The proposal was 'approved and agreed to by the council of the Royal Society,' but was not carried out.
