= Hugh B. Baker =

American judge (1882–1959)

Hugh B. Baker (June 17, 1882 – 1959) was a justice of the Rhode Island Supreme Court from 1935 to 1956.

Baker was the son of Darius Baker, who also served on the state supreme court. Baker received his undergraduate degree from Harvard College in 1903, and his law degree from Harvard Law School in 1906.

Baker was the presiding judge of the state Superior Court judge until 1935, when the Democratic Party unexpectedly gained control of the state legislature, and appointed an entirely new state supreme court, including Baker. He served until his resignation from the court on January 18, 1956.

Political offices
Preceded by Newly reconstituted court	Justice of the Rhode Island Supreme Court; 1935–1956	Succeeded by Harold A. Andrews
