= Thomas Baker (American general) =

US Air Force general (born 1935)

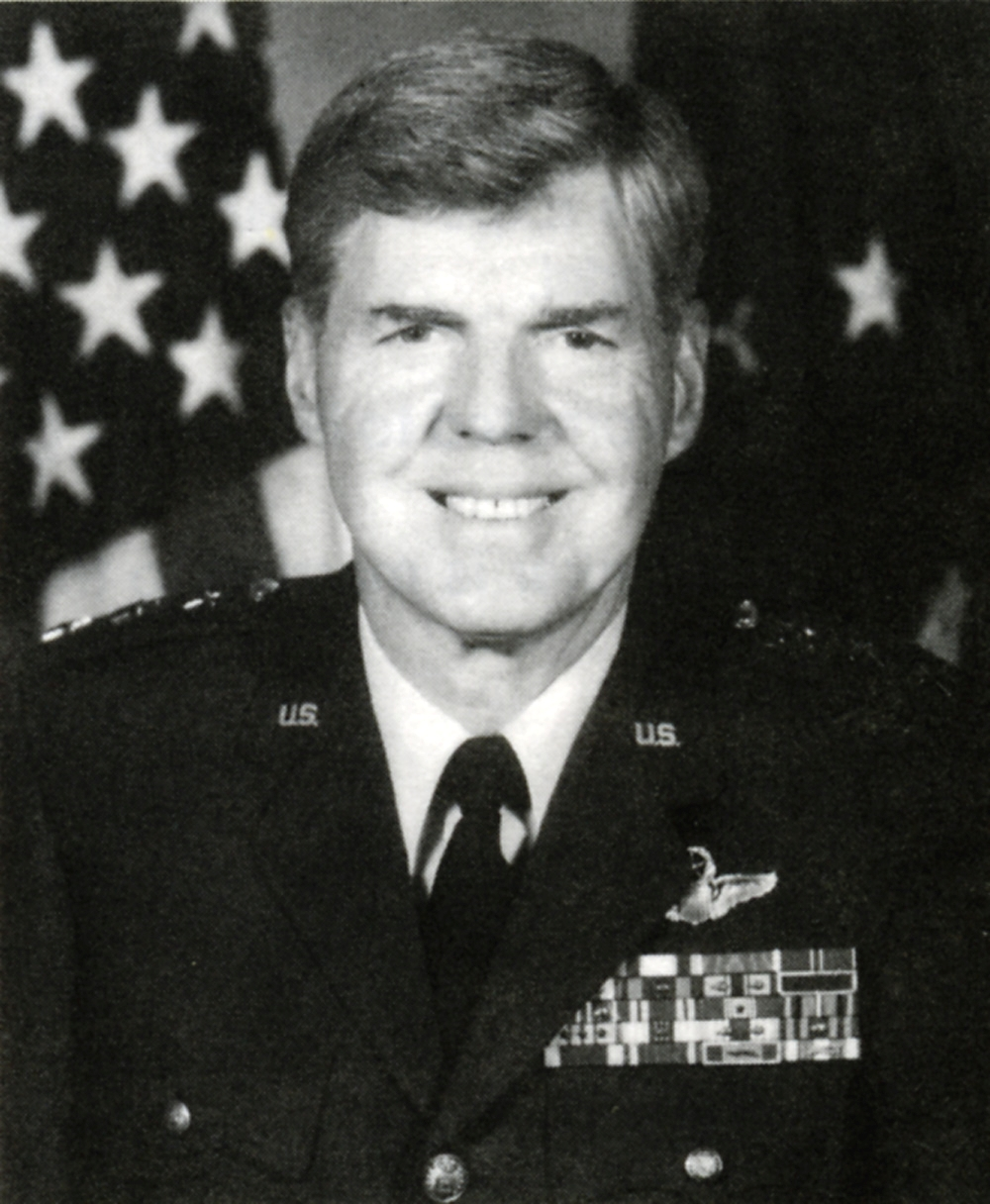
- Born: May 9, 1935 (age 91); Golconda, Illinois, U.S.
- Military career
- Allegiance: United States
- Branch: United States Air Force
- Service years: 1957–1993
- Rank: Lieutenant general
- Commands: Twelfth Air Force; vice Commander, Tactical Air Command; Deputy commander in chief United Nations Command; deputy commander, United States Forces Korea; commander, Air Component Command, Combined Forces Command, and commander, 7th Air Force

Thomas A. Baker (born May 9, 1935) is a retired lieutenant general in the United States Air Force who served as commander of the Twelfth Air Force, deputy commander in chief of United Nations Command and vice commander of Tactical Air Command. He was commissioned in 1957 and retired in 1993.
