= Thomas Baker (mayor of Plymouth) =

English politician (died 1926)

Sir Thomas Baker KBE JP

Mayor of Plymouth
- In office 1913–1916

Personal details
- Died: 17 December 1926

Sir Thomas Baker KBE JP (died 17 December 1926) was an alderman on Plymouth Borough Council who served as Mayor of Plymouth from 1913 to 1916. A prominent local member of the Liberal Party and a justice of the peace from 1919, he was heavily involved in recruiting work during the First World War, for which he was appointed Knight Commander of the Order of the British Empire (KBE) in the civilian war honours of 30 March 1920.
