= Thomas Baker (entomologist) =

American entomologist

Thomas C. Baker is an American entomologist, focusing in study of insect pheromones and odor-mediated behavior, neuroethological studies of olfaction, identification and development of insect attractants for IPM systems, and development of olfaction-based biosensors and chemical ecology, currently Distinguished Professor at Pennsylvania State University and an Elected Fellow of the American Association for the Advancement of Science.
