= Alison Baker (writer) =

American short story writer

- Born: 1953 (age 72–73); Lancaster, Pennsylvania
- Education: Reed College, Indiana University
- Writing career
- Genre: short story

Alison Baker (born 1953 in Lancaster, Pennsylvania) is an American writer of short stories and essays.

== Life ==
She graduated from Reed College and Indiana University with a Master of Library Science. She worked as a medical librarian and a library activist.

Her work has appeared in Shenandoah, the Atlantic Monthly, Story, Alaska Quarterly Review, Orion Nature Quarterly, the Washington Post, Witness, ZYZZYVA.

She has written and recorded personal essays and commentaries for Jefferson Public Radio in Ashland, Oregon, and Outermost Community Radio in Provincetown, Massachusetts.

She was a Ragdale Foundation resident, a Fellow at Virginia Center for the Creative Arts, and a Fellow at the Norman Mailer Writers Center.

== Awards ==
- 1992 George Garrett Fiction Award for "Field Notes"
- 1994 O. Henry Award
- the Gettysburg Review Award
- George Garrett Award for Fiction
- finalist for the National Magazine Award.

== Works ==
- Happy Hour. Tickenoak Publications. 2013.
- Loving Wanda Beaver: Novella and Stories. Chronicle Books. 1997. ISBN 978-0-8118-1788-2. "Alison Baker."
- How I Came West, and Why I Stayed. Chronicle Books. April 1, 1993. ISBN 978-0-8118-0324-3.

=== Anthologies ===
- The Best American Short Stories 1993
- Best of the West
- New Stories From the South
- Pushcart Prize.t
