= Loran Ellis Baker (legislative councillor) =

Canadian politician

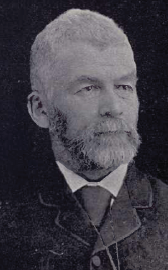

Member of the Legislative Council of Nova Scotia
- In office 1878–1899

Personal details
- Born: May 13, 1831 Yarmouth, Nova Scotia
- Died: December 31, 1899 (aged 68) On a train between New York City and Boston

Loran Ellis Baker (May 13, 1831 – December 31, 1899) was a Canadian businessman in Yarmouth where he built a large importing and mercantile business and eventually branched into ship ownership to facilitate the trade.

He was born on May 13, 1831, in Yarmouth, Nova Scotia, the only child of Delina (Kenney) and Ellis Baker.

He was in 1870, the first president of the Western Counties Railway Company, the WCR was one of the founding companies of the Dominion Atlantic Railway.

Baker is credited with establishing tourism in Nova Scotia in 1885 using the Yarmouth Steamship Company to bring tourists to the province and forming a company which built the requisite hotels and amenities at appropriate locations. He was appointed to the Legislative Council of Nova Scotia in 1878. On December 31, 1899, he died while sleeping on a train from Boston to New York City.

== See also ==
- List of Bishop's College School alumni
