= USS Paul G. Baker (DE-642) =

Buckley-class destroyer escort

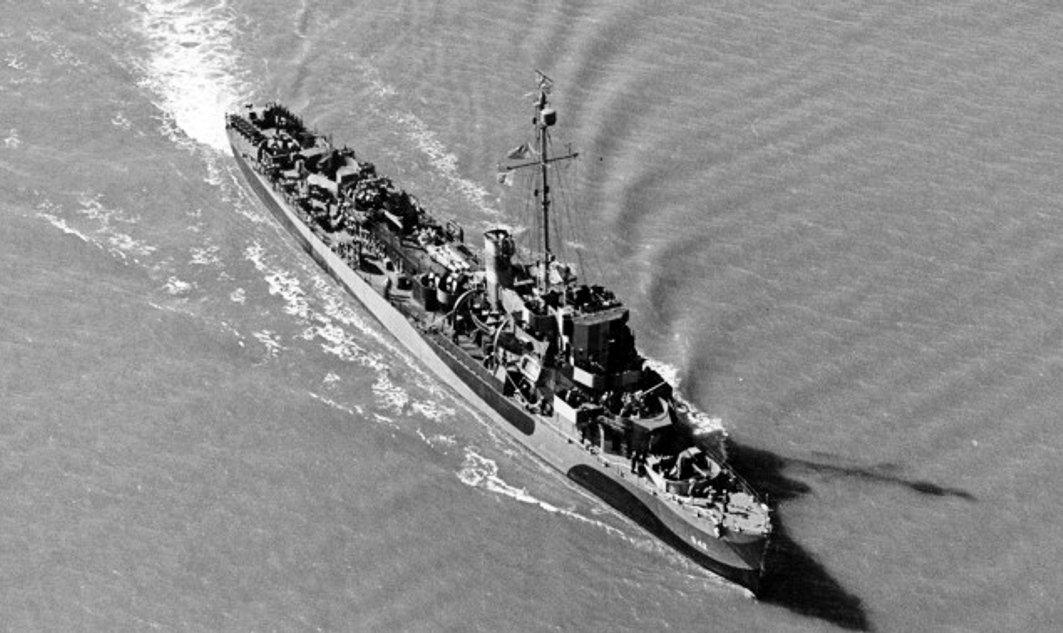

History

United States
- Laid down: 26 September 1943
- Launched: 12 March 1944
- Commissioned: 25 May 1944
- Decommissioned: 3 February 1947
- Stricken: 1 December 1969
- Fate: Sold for scrap, October 1970

General characteristics
- Displacement: 1,740 tons full; 1,400 tons, standard
- Length: 306 ft 0 in (93.27 m)
- Beam: 36 ft 9 in (11.20 m)
- Draft: 13 ft 6 in (4.11 m)
- Propulsion: GE turbo-electric drive, 12,000 hp (8.9 MW); two propellers
- Speed: 24 knots (44 km/h)
- Range: 4,940 nautical miles (9,150 km) at 12 knots (22 km/h)
- Complement: 15 officers, 198 men
- Armament: 3 × 3 in (76 mm) DP guns, 3 × 21 in (53 cm) torpedo tubes, 1 × 1.1 in (28 mm) quad AA gun, 8 × 20 mm cannon, 1 × hedgehog projector, 2 × depth charge tracks, 8 × K-gun depth charge projectors

USS Paul G. Baker (DE-642) was a Buckley-class destroyer escort in service with the United States Navy from 1944 to 1946. She was scrapped in 1970.

The ship was named for Paul Gerald Baker, a naval aviator killed during the Battle of the Coral Sea in May 1942.

== Construction and commissioning ==
Paul G. Baker was laid down on 26 September 1943 by Bethlehem Steel Co., San Francisco, California; launched on 12 March 1944; sponsored by Mrs. Katherine E. Baker; and commissioned on 25 May 1944.

== History ==
Steaming to San Diego on 18 June 1944 for shakedown, Paul G. Baker returned to San Francisco on 20 July for post-shakedown repairs and alterations. She departed 11 August for Seattle, Washington, arriving two days later. After picking up a convoy at Port Angeles, she set course for Pearl Harbor on the 19th and arrived on the 27th.

Paul G. Baker cleared Pearl Harbor on 8 September 1944 as part of an escort carrier task unit which called at Emirau Island en route to Manus Island, Admiralties, where she arrived on 19 September for escort duty under Task Force 11 (TF 11). On the 24th she headed for Port Purvis on Florida Island in the Solomons, arriving three days later.

Her duty in the Solomons was largely escort work. She steamed from Purvis Bay 11 October to pick up merchantman Mormacsea at Empress Augusta Bay, Bougainville, for escort to Munda, returning to her base on the 15th. She made a similar voyage 19–24 October, escorting SS Santa Monica from Lunga Point, Guadalcanal, to Treasury Island and Sasavelle Harbor, Munda, before returning alone to Purvis Bay. From late November through most of December, she shuttled from Purvis Bay to Espiritu Santo, New Hebrides. From 12 January 1945 she trained for the invasion of the Ryukyus. Departing the Russell Islands, 15 March, she steamed via Saipan to Ulithi departing that port 27 March to escort troop-laden transports for the landings on Okinawa.

The task unit arrived off Okinawa on the day of the initial landings, 1 April 1945, and Paul G. Baker took station on the inner transport screen off Hagushi Beach. Her first taste of enemy air activity came at dusk that day when she opened fire on a plane which crossed astern. She protected the transports during unloading by day and retirement by night until she departed the invasion area 5 April guarding empty transports to Guam, arriving on the 9th thence to Ulithi to join a convoy for Okinawa.

Arriving off Okinawa 18 April 1945, Paul G. Baker joined the dangerous but vital patrol screen which protected Allied forces fighting to capture the island stronghold. On the 22nd, at 17:45, enemy planes attacked without warning. One aircraft crashed into nearby Isherwood (DD-520) and at 18:47 another closed Paul G. Baker. The plane swerved away and crashed into Swallow (AM-65) which capsized in about four minutes. Baker picked up nine officers and 69 men. Other ships also steamed to aid the stricken minesweeper, rescuing all but one of Swallow's crew.

The air attacks continued to be heavy and frequent for patrol vessels off Okinawa. On 12 May 1945 Paul G. Baker opened fire on two suicide planes attacking New Mexico (BB-40) and although she aided in splashing one of the kamikazes the other hit the battleship. On the 24th Baker joined the fire on a single plane which had wandered into the area. On 11 June, a low-flying airplane made a dive on Lindenwald (LSD-6), shifted the attack to Paul G. Baker, then swerved toward a merchant ship. Baker's gunners splashed this enemy fifty feet from its intended target.

On 20 June 1945 Paul G. Baker sailed in the screen of a battleship and cruiser force to patrol southeast of Okinawa. She returned to Kerama Retto 1 July to commence a series of five escort voyages between Okinawa and Saipan, lasting till 30 August.

Paul G. Baker steamed from Saipan 11 September 1945 to escort Malabar (AF-37) to Tokyo Bay, arriving at Yokosuka Naval Base on the 17th. Five days later she sailed singly for Saipan, arriving on the 25th. On 4 November 1945 she got underway for the United States arriving at Astoria, Oregon, on the 21st. After overhaul at Portland, Oregon and Bremerton, Washington, she returned to Guam, arriving 23 May 1946.

Departing Guam 26 June, Paul G. Baker sailed to Buckner Bay, Okinawa before arriving in Qingdao, China, 2 July. She exercised off the China coast with destroyers, then sailed on 3 August to visit Hong Kong. Baker paid another visit to Sasebo, Japan before departing 10 September. She returned to Qingdao on 12 September, and for the next month conducted exercises with a small hunter-killer training group in the area.

Homeward bound for good, Paul G. Baker departed Qingdao 12 October, called at Guam 18 October, visited Pearl Harbor 27–28 October, and arrived San Diego 4 November. She decommissioned on 3 February 1947, and was placed in reserve at San Diego. She was struck from the Naval Vessel Register on 1 December 1969.

Paul G. Baker received one battle star for World War II service.
