= Thomas Baker (Peasants' Revolt leader) =

14th-century English rebel leader

- Born: Fobbing, Essex, England
- Died: 4 July 1381; Chelmsford, Essex, England
- Known for: Peasants' Revolt

Thomas Baker (died 4 July 1381) was an English landowner and one of the leaders who initiated the Peasants' Revolt of 1381.

His holding was "Pokattescroft alias Bakerescroft" in Fobbing. This holding still exists, although by the time of the 19th-century tithe map it had become known as Whitehall Six Acres.

== Role in the revolt ==
The Peasants' Revolt was triggered by incidents in the Essex villages of Fobbing and Brentwood. On 30 May, John Brampton attempted to collect the poll tax from villagers at Fobbing. The villagers, led by Baker, a local landowner, told Brampton that they would give him nothing and he was forced to leave the village empty-handed. Robert Belknap, Chief Justice of Common Pleas, was sent to investigate the incident and to punish the offenders. On 2 June, he was attacked at Brentwood. By this time the violent discontent had spread, and the counties of Essex and Kent were in full revolt. Soon people moved on London in an armed uprising.

== Death ==
For his role in the uprising, Baker was hanged, drawn, and quartered on 4 July 1381 at Chelmsford.
