= Horace Baker (politician) =

American politician

Acting Governor of New Jersey
- In office 1910–1911
- Preceded by: John Franklin Fort
- Succeeded by: Woodrow Wilson

Personal details
- Born: Thomas Woodrow Wilson; January 23, 1869 Elizabeth, New Jersey, U.S.
- Died: December 7, 1941 (aged 72) New York City, New York, U.S.

Horace B. Baker (January 23, 1869 – December 7, 1941) was an American politician who served as acting governor of the state of New Jersey. He was the nephew of Andrew D. Baker.

Baker was born in Elizabeth, New Jersey in 1869. Elected as a Republican, he was a member of New Jersey Senate between 1894 and 1906, and became the Acting Governor of New Jersey and served between 1909 and 1910. Then he served as the Governor. He died in New York City in 1941.

== See also ==
- List of governors of New Jersey

Political offices
Preceded by John Franklin Fort	Governor of New Jersey; 1910–1911	Succeeded by Woodrow Wilson
