= Bob Baker =

Bob Baker or Bobby Baker may refer to:

- Bob Baker (actor) (1910–1975), American singer and actor
- Bob Baker (American football) (born 1927), American football coach
- Bob Baker (basketball) (1919–1950), American professional basketball player
- Bob Baker (boxer) (1926–2002), American heavyweight boxer
- Bob Baker (ice hockey) (1926–2012), American ice hockey player
- Bob Baker (politician) (1917–1985), Australian politician
- Bob Baker (scriptwriter) (1939–2021), British television and film writer
- Bobby Baker (1928–2017), American political advisor to Lyndon Johnson
- Bobby Baker (artist) (born 1950), English performance artist
- Bob Baker (director) (born 1952), Canadian theatre director
- Bobby Baker (racing driver), American NASCAR driver

== See also ==
- Bob Baker Memorial Airport, a public airport in Alaska
- Bob Baker Marionette Theater, founded by Bob Baker and Alton Wood in 1963, the oldest children's theater company in Los Angeles
- Robert Baker (disambiguation)
