= Robert Baker =

Robert Baker may refer to:

== Arts ==
- Robert Baker (actor) (born 1979), American actor known from Grey's Anatomy and Out of Time
- Robert Hart Baker (1954–2023), American conductor and music director
- Robert S. Baker (1916–2009), British television and film producer, best known for producing The Saint
- Bob Baker (scriptwriter) (1939–2021), British writer
- Bob Baker (director) (Robert Kenneth Baker, born 1952), Canadian theatre director
- Rob Baker (Ghostwriter), a character in the American TV series Ghostwriter
- Rob Baker (guitarist) (born 1962), Canadian guitarist with the band The Tragically Hip
- Bobby Baker (artist) (born 1950), British multi-disciplinary artist and activist

== Sports ==
- Robert Baker (basketball) (born 1998), American basketball player
- Robert Baker (cricketer) (1849–1896), British player for Yorkshire County Cricket Club
- Robert Baker (gridiron football) (born 1976), former American professional football player in the US and Canada
- Bob Baker (American football) (Robert Baker, born 1927), American gridiron football coach
- Robert Baker (ice hockey) (1926–2012), American ice hockey player
- Bob Baker (boxer) (1926–2002), American heavyweight boxer, 1950s leading contender
- Bobby Baker (racing driver), American driver
- Rob Baker (cricketer) (born 1975), Australian player for Western Australia

== Political figures ==
- Robert Baker (New York politician) (1862–1943), U.S. representative from New York (1903–1905)
- Robert Hall Baker (1839–1882), school commissioner, alderman, mayor, senator from Wisconsin (1872–1876), and businessman
- Bob Baker (politician) (Robert Wilfred Baker, 1917–1985), Australian lawyer, legal scholar and politician
- Bobby Baker (1928–2017), American political adviser of Lyndon B. Johnson

== Others ==
- Robert Baker (explorer), English voyager to Guinea in 1562–1563
- Robert Baker (scientist) (1938–2004), English metallurgist and steelmaker
- Robert A. Baker (1921–2005), American psychologist, professor at University of Kentucky
- Barney Baker (Robert Baker, 1911–1990), Teamsters official
- Robert C. Baker (1921–2006), American inventor of the "chicken nugget", professor at Cornell University
- Robert Hoapili Baker (1847–1900), Hawaiian colonel and governor
- Robert Horace Baker (1883–1964), American astronomer
- Robert Joseph Baker (born 1944), Roman Catholic bishop of Birmingham, Alabama
- Robert M. L. Baker Jr. (born 1930), American physicist
- Robert Symington Baker (1826–1894), American businessman and landowner
- Robert James Baker (1942–2018), American mammalogist
- Robert Lewis Baker (1937–1979), American horticulturist and botanist
- Robert Baker (gunsmith), allegedly invented Daniel Boone's gun, the Long Rifle
- Robert Baker, tailor specialising in piccadills, whose house, Pickadilly Hall, gave rise to the placename Piccadilly

== See also ==
- Bob Baker (disambiguation)
- Bert Baker (disambiguation)
- Robert T. Bakker (born 1945), American paleontologist (pronounced "Backer")
- Robert Baker Aitken (1917–2010), American Zen teacher
- James Robert Baker (1947–1997), American author
- Robert Baker Girdlestone (1836–1923), English priest, scholar, and first principal of Wycliffe Hall, Oxford
