= 1987 First Union 400 =

Sixth race of the 1987 NASCAR Winston Cup Series

Race details
- Race 6 of 29 in the 1987 NASCAR Winston Cup Series
- The 1987 First Union 400 program cover, featuring Dale Earnhardt.
- Date: April 5, 1987
- Official name: 37th Annual First Union 400
- Location: North Wilkesboro Speedway, North Wilkesboro, North Carolina
- Course: Permanent racing facility
- Course length: 1.006 km (0.625 miles)
- Distance: 400 laps, 250 mi (402.336 km)
- Scheduled distance: 400 laps, 250 mi (402.336 km)
- Average speed: 94.103 miles per hour (151.444 km/h)
- Attendance: 26,500

Pole position
Driver	Bill Elliott	Melling Racing
- Time: 19.396

Most laps led
Driver	Dale Earnhardt	Richard Childress Racing
- Laps: 319

Winner
No. 3	Dale Earnhardt	Richard Childress Racing

Television in the United States
- Network: ESPN
- Announcers: Bob Jenkins, Larry Nuber

Radio in the United States
- Radio: Motor Racing Network

The 1987 First Union 400 was the sixth stock car race of the 1987 NASCAR Winston Cup Series season and the 37th iteration of the event. The race was held on Sunday, April 5, 1987, before an audience of 26,500 in North Wilkesboro, North Carolina at the North Wilkesboro Speedway, a 0.625 miles (1.006 km) oval short track. The race took the scheduled 400 laps to complete.

By race's end, Richard Childress Racing's Dale Earnhardt managed to dominate a majority of the race, leading 319 laps en route to his 24th career NASCAR Winston Cup Series victory, his fourth victory of the season, his second straight win, and his fourth win in six races, increasing his driver's championship points lead to 117 points over second-place driver Bill Elliott. To fill out the top three, Wood Brothers Racing's Kyle Petty and RahMoc Enterprises' Neil Bonnett finished second and third, respectively.

== Background ==
The layout of North Wilkesboro Speedway, the venue where the race was held

North Wilkesboro Speedway is a short oval racetrack located on U.S. Route 421, about five miles east of the town of North Wilkesboro, North Carolina, or 80 miles north of Charlotte. It measures 0.625 mi (1.006 km) and features a unique uphill backstretch and downhill frontstretch. It has previously held races in NASCAR's top three series, including 93 Winston Cup Series races. The track, a NASCAR original, operated from 1949, NASCAR's inception, until the track's original closure in 1996. The speedway briefly reopened in 2010 and hosted several stock car series races before closing again in the spring of 2011. It was re-opened in August 2022 for grassroots racing.

=== Entry list ===
- (R) denotes rookie driver.

#	Driver	Team	Make	Sponsor
3	Dale Earnhardt	Richard Childress Racing	Chevrolet	Wrangler
5	Geoff Bodine	Hendrick Motorsports	Chevrolet	Levi Garrett
6	Bobby Baker	U.S. Racing	Chevrolet	U.S. Racing
7	Alan Kulwicki	AK Racing	Ford	Zerex
8	Bobby Hillin Jr.	Stavola Brothers Racing	Buick	Miller American
9	Bill Elliott	Melling Racing	Ford	Coors
10	Rodney Combs	DiGard Motorsports	Chevrolet	DiGard Motorsports
11	Terry Labonte (Note: Due to injuries sustained at the 1987 TranSouth 500, Labonte was replaced by Brett Bodine for qualifying. However, Labonte was able to run pace laps during the race before Bodine substituted him for the race. Per the rules at the time, Labonte is credited with starting the race.)	Junior Johnson & Associates	Chevrolet	Budweiser
12	Doug Wolfgang (Note: Wolfgang qualified for the race; however, for unknown reasons, he was replaced by Slick Johnson for the race.)	Hamby Racing	Chevrolet	Hesco Exhaust Systems
15	Ricky Rudd	Bud Moore Engineering	Ford	Motorcraft Quality Parts
16	Larry Pearson	Pearson Racing	Chevrolet	Chattanooga Chew
17	Darrell Waltrip	Hendrick Motorsports	Chevrolet	Tide
18	Dale Jarrett (R)	Freedlander Motorsports	Chevrolet	Freedlander Financial
21	Kyle Petty	Wood Brothers Racing	Ford	Citgo
22	Bobby Allison	Stavola Brothers Racing	Buick	Miller American
26	Morgan Shepherd	King Racing	Buick	Quaker State
27	Rusty Wallace	Blue Max Racing	Pontiac	Kodiak
30	Michael Waltrip	Bahari Racing	Chevrolet	Bahari Racing
33	Harry Gant	Mach 1 Racing	Chevrolet	Skoal Bandit
34	Jesse Samples Jr.	AAG Racing	Chevrolet	Allen's Glass
35	Benny Parsons	Hendrick Motorsports	Chevrolet	Folgers
43	Richard Petty	Petty Enterprises	Pontiac	STP
44	Sterling Marlin	Hagan Racing	Oldsmobile	Piedmont Airlines
52	Jimmy Means	Jimmy Means Racing	Pontiac	Turtle Wax
55	Phil Parsons	Jackson Bros. Motorsports	Oldsmobile	Copenhagen
62	Steve Christman (R)	Winkle Motorsports	Pontiac	AC Spark Plug
64	Jerry Cranmer	Langley Racing	Ford	Sunny King Ford
67	Eddie Bierschwale (Note: After Bierschwale failed to qualify, Bierschwale replaced Buddy Arrington for the race.)	Arrington Racing	Ford	Pannill Sweatshirts
70	J. D. McDuffie	McDuffie Racing	Pontiac	Rumple Furniture
71	Dave Marcis	Marcis Auto Racing	Chevrolet	Lifebuoy
75	Neil Bonnett	RahMoc Enterprises	Pontiac	Valvoline
81	Buddy Arrington	Fillip Racing	Ford	Pannill Sweatshirts
90	Ken Schrader	Donlavey Racing	Ford	Red Baron Frozen Pizza

== Qualifying ==
Qualifying was originally scheduled to be split into two rounds. The first round was scheduled to be held on Friday, April 5, at 3:00 PM EST. Originally, the first 10 positions were going to be determined by first round qualifying, with positions 11-30 meant to be determined the following day on Saturday, April 6, at 12:15 PM EST. However, due to rain, the first round was cancelled. As a result, qualifying was condensed into one round for all starting grid spots in the race, which was run on Saturday. Depending on who needed it, a select amount of positions were given to cars who had not otherwise qualified but were high enough in owner's points; up to two were given.

Bill Elliott, driving for Melling Racing, managed to win the pole, setting a time of 19.396 and an average speed of 116.003 miles per hour (186.689 km/h).

Eddie Bierschwale was the only driver to fail to qualify.

=== Full qualifying results ===
Pos.	#	Driver	Team	Make	Time	Speed
1	9	Bill Elliott	Melling Racing	Ford	19.396	116.003
2	35	Benny Parsons	Hendrick Motorsports	Chevrolet	19.621	114.673
3	3	Dale Earnhardt	Richard Childress Racing	Chevrolet	19.667	114.405
4	22	Bobby Allison	Stavola Brothers Racing	Buick	19.669	114.393
5	11	Brett Bodine	Junior Johnson & Associates	Chevrolet	19.709	114.161
6	17	Darrell Waltrip	Hendrick Motorsports	Chevrolet	19.736	114.005
7	5	Geoff Bodine	Hendrick Motorsports	Chevrolet	19.756	113.889
8	26	Morgan Shepherd	King Racing	Buick	19.769	113.815
9	27	Rusty Wallace	Blue Max Racing	Pontiac	19.772	113.797
10	30	Michael Waltrip	Bahari Racing	Chevrolet	19.775	113.780
Failed to lock in Round 1
11	15	Ricky Rudd	Bud Moore Engineering	Ford	19.635	114.591
12	21	Kyle Petty	Wood Brothers Racing	Ford	19.645	114.533
13	90	Ken Schrader	Donlavey Racing	Ford	19.686	114.294
14	18	Dale Jarrett (R)	Freedlander Motorsports	Chevrolet	19.721	114.092
15	43	Richard Petty	Petty Enterprises	Pontiac	19.777	113.769
16	33	Harry Gant	Mach 1 Racing	Chevrolet	19.788	113.705
17	55	Phil Parsons	Jackson Bros. Motorsports	Oldsmobile	19.822	113.510
18	44	Sterling Marlin	Hagan Racing	Oldsmobile	19.849	113.356
19	7	Alan Kulwicki	AK Racing	Ford	19.858	113.304
20	16	Larry Pearson	Pearson Racing	Chevrolet	19.896	113.088
21	75	Neil Bonnett	RahMoc Enterprises	Pontiac	19.898	113.077
22	62	Steve Christman (R)	Winkle Motorsports	Pontiac	19.959	112.731
23	10	Rodney Combs	DiGard Motorsports	Chevrolet	19.988	112.568
24	64	Jerry Cranmer	Langley Racing	Ford	20.013	112.427
25	34	Jesse Samples Jr.	AAG Racing	Chevrolet	20.025	112.360
26	8	Bobby Hillin Jr.	Stavola Brothers Racing	Buick	20.029	112.337
27	52	Jimmy Means	Jimmy Means Racing	Pontiac	20.139	111.724
28	71	Dave Marcis	Marcis Auto Racing	Chevrolet	20.161	111.602
29	81	Buddy Arrington	Fillip Racing	Ford	20.214	111.309
30	6	Bobby Baker	U.S. Racing	Chevrolet	20.243	111.150
Provisionals
31	12	Doug Wolfgang	Hamby Racing	Oldsmobile	-*	-*
32	70	J. D. McDuffie	McDuffie Racing	Pontiac	-*	-*
Failed to qualify
33	67	Eddie Bierschwale	Arrington Racing	Ford	-*	-*
Official starting lineup

== Race results ==
Fin	St	#	Driver	Team	Make	Laps	Led	Status	Pts	Winnings
1	3	3	Dale Earnhardt	Richard Childress Racing	Chevrolet	400	319	running	185	$44,675
2	12	21	Kyle Petty	Wood Brothers Racing	Ford	400	0	running	170	$20,055
3	21	75	Neil Bonnett	RahMoc Enterprises	Pontiac	400	56	running	170	$14,470
4	19	7	Alan Kulwicki	AK Racing	Ford	400	0	running	160	$12,935
5	11	15	Ricky Rudd	Bud Moore Engineering	Ford	399	0	running	155	$14,890
6	15	43	Richard Petty	Petty Enterprises	Pontiac	399	1	running	155	$6,435
7	17	55	Phil Parsons	Jackson Bros. Motorsports	Oldsmobile	399	0	running	146	$4,660
8	5	11	Terry Labonte	Junior Johnson & Associates	Chevrolet	398	0	running	142	$10,515
9	9	27	Rusty Wallace	Blue Max Racing	Pontiac	398	0	running	138	$8,685
10	1	9	Bill Elliott	Melling Racing	Ford	398	10	running	139	$17,185
11	16	33	Harry Gant	Mach 1 Racing	Chevrolet	398	0	running	130	$4,885
12	14	18	Dale Jarrett (R)	Freedlander Motorsports	Chevrolet	398	0	running	0	$4,725
13	26	8	Bobby Hillin Jr.	Stavola Brothers Racing	Buick	397	1	running	129	$7,380
14	4	22	Bobby Allison	Stavola Brothers Racing	Buick	396	0	running	121	$7,300
15	2	35	Benny Parsons	Hendrick Motorsports	Chevrolet	396	12	running	123	$9,830
16	13	90	Ken Schrader	Donlavey Racing	Ford	396	0	running	115	$4,415
17	18	44	Sterling Marlin	Hagan Racing	Oldsmobile	395	0	running	112	$4,205
18	29	81	Eddie Bierschwale	Fillip Racing	Ford	392	0	running	109	$1,430
19	31	12	Slick Johnson	Hamby Racing	Oldsmobile	392	1	running	0	$4,045
20	23	10	Rodney Combs	DiGard Motorsports	Chevrolet	386	0	running	103	$2,030
21	6	17	Darrell Waltrip	Hendrick Motorsports	Chevrolet	383	0	running	100	$1,335
22	24	64	Jerry Cranmer	Langley Racing	Ford	380	0	running	97	$3,815
23	30	6	Bobby Baker	U.S. Racing	Chevrolet	380	0	running	94	$3,500
24	10	30	Michael Waltrip	Bahari Racing	Chevrolet	379	0	running	91	$3,440
25	20	16	Larry Pearson	Pearson Racing	Chevrolet	359	0	rear end	88	$1,310
26	28	71	Dave Marcis	Marcis Auto Racing	Chevrolet	316	0	running	85	$3,355
27	8	26	Morgan Shepherd	King Racing	Buick	258	0	crash	82	$3,345
28	7	5	Geoff Bodine	Hendrick Motorsports	Chevrolet	240	0	engine	79	$7,610
29	25	34	Jesse Samples Jr.	AAG Racing	Chevrolet	156	0	rear end	76	$1,160
30	27	52	Jimmy Means	Jimmy Means Racing	Pontiac	74	0	cylinder head	73	$2,635
31	22	62	Steve Christman (R)	Winkle Motorsports	Pontiac	63	0	crash	70	$1,135
32	32	70	J. D. McDuffie	McDuffie Racing	Pontiac	29	0	engine	67	$1,085
Failed to qualify
33		67	Eddie Bierschwale	Arrington Racing	Ford					
Official race results

== Standings after the race ==
Drivers' Championship standings

	Pos	Driver	Points
	1	Dale Earnhardt	1,025
	2	Bill Elliott	928 (-117)
	3	Neil Bonnett	870 (-155)
1	4	Richard Petty	833 (–192)
3	5	Ricky Rudd	805 (–220)
2	6	Darrell Waltrip	790 (–235)
2	7	Terry Labonte	785 (–240)
	8	Benny Parsons	773 (–252)
3	9	Ken Schrader	770 (–255)
	10	Rusty Wallace	766 (–259)
Official driver's standings

- Note: Only the first 10 positions are included for the driver standings.

== Notes ==
Previous race: 1987 TranSouth 500	NASCAR Winston Cup Series; 1987 season	Next race: 1987 Valleydale Meats 500
