= Albert Baker =

Albert Baker may refer to:

- Albert C. Baker (1845–1921), American jurist and politician in Arizona
- Albert J. Baker (1874–1964), American politician in Wisconsin
- Albert Baker d'Isy (1906–1968), French cycling journalist
- Al Baker (baseball) (1906–1982), pitcher for the Boston Red Sox
- Albert William Baker (1918–2008), Canadian aviator
- Ginger Baker (loyalist) (Albert Walker Baker, born c. 1951), Northern Irish loyalist and soldier convicted of four murders
- Albert Baker (cricketer) (1872–1948), English cricketer

== See also ==
- Al Baker (disambiguation)
- Bert Baker (disambiguation)
