= 1987 Valleydale Meats 500 =

Seventh race of the 1987 NASCAR Winston Cup Series

Race details
- Race 7 of 29 in the 1987 NASCAR Winston Cup Series
- The 1987 Valleydale Meats 500 program cover, featuring Morgan Shepherd.
- Date: April 12, 1987
- Official name: 27th Annual Valleydale Meats 500
- Location: Bristol, Tennessee, Bristol International Raceway
- Course: Permanent racing facility
- Course length: 0.858 km (0.533 miles)
- Distance: 500 laps, 266.5 mi (428.89 km)
- Scheduled distance: 500 laps, 266.5 mi (428.89 km)
- Average speed: 75.621 miles per hour (121.700 km/h)
- Attendance: 34,000

Pole position
Driver	Harry Gant	Mach 1 Racing
- Time: 16.588

Most laps led
Driver	Bill Elliott	Melling Racing
- Laps: 149

Winner
No. 3	Dale Earnhardt	Richard Childress Racing

Television in the United States
- Network: ESPN
- Announcers: Bob Jenkins, Larry Nuber

Radio in the United States
- Radio: Motor Racing Network

The 1987 Valleydale Meats 500 was the seventh stock car race of the 1987 NASCAR Winston Cup Series season and the 27th iteration of the event. The race was held on Sunday, April 12, 1987, before an audience of 34,000 in Bristol, Tennessee, at Bristol International Raceway, a 0.533 miles (0.858 km) permanent oval-shaped racetrack.

By race's end, Richard Childress Racing's Dale Earnhardt had managed to dominate the final 100 laps of the race, coming back from a lap down early to take his 25th career NASCAR Winston Cup Series victory, his fifth victory of the season, and his third straight victory. To fill out the top three, owner-driver Richard Petty and Bud Moore Engineering's Ricky Rudd finished second and third, respectively.

== Background ==
The layout of Bristol International Raceway, the venue where the race was held.

The Bristol Motor Speedway, formerly known as Bristol International Raceway and Bristol Raceway, is a NASCAR short track venue located in Bristol, Tennessee. Constructed in 1960, it held its first NASCAR race on July 30, 1961. Despite its short length, Bristol is among the most popular tracks on the NASCAR schedule because of its distinct features, which include extraordinarily steep banking, an all concrete surface, two pit roads, and stadium-like seating. It has also been named one of the loudest NASCAR tracks.

=== Entry list ===
- (R) denotes rookie driver.

#	Driver	Team	Make	Sponsor
3	Dale Earnhardt	Richard Childress Racing	Chevrolet	Wrangler
5	Geoff Bodine	Hendrick Motorsports	Chevrolet	Levi Garrett
6	D. K. Ulrich	U.S. Racing	Chevrolet	U.S. Racing
7	Alan Kulwicki	AK Racing	Ford	Zerex
8	Bobby Hillin Jr.	Stavola Brothers Racing	Buick	Miller American
9	Bill Elliott	Melling Racing	Ford	Coors
11	Terry Labonte	Junior Johnson & Associates	Chevrolet	Budweiser
12	Slick Johnson	Hamby Racing	Chevrolet	Hesco Exhaust Systems
15	Ricky Rudd	Bud Moore Engineering	Ford	Motorcraft Quality Parts
17	Darrell Waltrip	Hendrick Motorsports	Chevrolet	Tide
18	Dale Jarrett (R)	Freedlander Motorsports	Chevrolet	Freedlander Financial
21	Kyle Petty	Wood Brothers Racing	Ford	Citgo
22	Bobby Allison	Stavola Brothers Racing	Buick	Miller American
26	Morgan Shepherd	King Racing	Buick	Quaker State
27	Rusty Wallace	Blue Max Racing	Pontiac	Kodiak
30	Michael Waltrip	Bahari Racing	Chevrolet	Bahari Racing
33	Harry Gant	Mach 1 Racing	Chevrolet	Skoal Bandit
35	Benny Parsons	Hendrick Motorsports	Chevrolet	Folgers
41	Ronnie Thomas	Ronnie Thomas Racing	Chevrolet	Busch Polishes
43	Richard Petty	Petty Enterprises	Pontiac	STP
44	Sterling Marlin	Hagan Racing	Oldsmobile	Piedmont Airlines
48	Tony Spanos	Hylton Motorsports	Chevrolet	Hylton Motorsports
52	Jimmy Means	Jimmy Means Racing	Pontiac	Turtle Wax
55	Phil Parsons	Jackson Bros. Motorsports	Oldsmobile	Copenhagen
64	Jerry Cranmer	Langley Racing	Ford	Sunny King Ford
67	Eddie Bierschwale	Arrington Racing	Ford	Pannill Sweatshirts
70	J. D. McDuffie	McDuffie Racing	Pontiac	Rumple Furniture
71	Dave Marcis	Marcis Auto Racing	Chevrolet	Lifebuoy
75	Neil Bonnett	RahMoc Enterprises	Pontiac	Valvoline
81	Mike Potter	Fillip Racing	Ford	Pannill Sweatshirts
90	Ken Schrader	Donlavey Racing	Ford	Red Baron Frozen Pizza

== Qualifying ==
Qualifying was split into two rounds. The first round was held on Friday, April 8, at 4:45 pm EST. Each driver would have one lap to set a time. During the first round, the top 15 drivers in the round would be guaranteed a starting spot in the race. If a driver was not able to guarantee a spot in the first round, they had the option to scrub their time from the first round and try and run a faster lap time in a second round qualifying run, held on Saturday, April 9, at 12:00 pm EST. As with the first round, each driver would have one lap to set a time. For this specific race, positions 16-30 would be decided on time, and depending on who needed it, a select amount of positions were given to cars who had not otherwise qualified but were high enough in owner's points; up to two were given.

Harry Gant, driving for Mach 1 Racing, managed to win the pole, setting a time of 16.588 and an average speed of 115.674 miles per hour (186.159 km/h) in the first round.

Tony Spanos was the only driver to fail to qualify.

=== Full qualifying results ===
Pos.	#	Driver	Team	Make	Time	Speed
1	33	Harry Gant	Mach 1 Racing	Chevrolet	16.588	115.674
2	27	Rusty Wallace	Blue Max Racing	Pontiac	16.635	115.347
3	3	Dale Earnhardt	Richard Childress Racing	Chevrolet	16.665	115.140
4	5	Geoff Bodine	Hendrick Motorsports	Chevrolet	16.677	115.057
5	7	Alan Kulwicki	AK Racing	Ford	16.710	114.829
6	22	Bobby Allison	Stavola Brothers Racing	Buick	16.723	114.740
7	90	Ken Schrader	Donlavey Racing	Ford	16.727	114.713
8	26	Morgan Shepherd	King Racing	Buick	16.736	114.651
9	35	Benny Parsons	Hendrick Motorsports	Chevrolet	16.755	114.521
10	75	Neil Bonnett	RahMoc Enterprises	Pontiac	16.794	114.255
11	9	Bill Elliott	Melling Racing	Ford	16.800	114.214
12	17	Darrell Waltrip	Hendrick Motorsports	Chevrolet	16.826	114.038
13	11	Terry Labonte	Junior Johnson & Associates	Chevrolet	16.839	113.950
14	44	Sterling Marlin	Hagan Racing	Oldsmobile	16.858	113.821
15	15	Ricky Rudd	Bud Moore Engineering	Ford	16.881	113.666
Failed to lock in Round 1
16	21	Kyle Petty	Wood Brothers Racing	Ford	16.946	113.230
17	71	Dave Marcis	Marcis Auto Racing	Chevrolet	16.948	113.217
18	43	Richard Petty	Petty Enterprises	Pontiac	16.998	112.884
19	55	Phil Parsons	Jackson Bros. Motorsports	Oldsmobile	17.211	111.487
20	8	Bobby Hillin Jr.	Stavola Brothers Racing	Buick	17.255	111.203
21	52	Jimmy Means	Jimmy Means Racing	Pontiac	17.262	111.157
22	67	Eddie Bierschwale	Arrington Racing	Ford	17.292	110.965
23	30	Michael Waltrip	Bahari Racing	Pontiac	17.292	110.965
24	18	Dale Jarrett (R)	Freedlander Motorsports	Chevrolet	17.295	110.945
25	12	Slick Johnson	Hamby Racing	Chevrolet	17.420	110.149
26	70	J. D. McDuffie	McDuffie Racing	Pontiac	17.448	109.972
27	64	Jerry Cranmer	Langley Racing	Ford	17.522	109.508
28	6	D. K. Ulrich	U.S. Racing	Chevrolet	17.611	108.955
29	81	Mike Potter	Fillip Racing	Ford	17.619	108.905
30	41	Ronnie Thomas	Ronnie Thomas Racing	Chevrolet	17.807	107.755
Failed to qualify
31	48	Tony Spanos	Hylton Motorsports	Chevrolet	18.480	103.831
Official first round qualifying results
Official starting lineup

== Race results ==
Fin	St	#	Driver	Team	Make	Laps	Led	Status	Pts	Winnings
1	3	3	Dale Earnhardt	Richard Childress Racing	Chevrolet	500	134	running	180	$43,850
2	18	43	Richard Petty	Petty Enterprises	Pontiac	500	1	running	175	$21,030
3	15	15	Ricky Rudd	Bud Moore Engineering	Ford	500	0	running	165	$17,175
4	11	9	Bill Elliott	Melling Racing	Ford	500	149	running	170	$12,570
5	5	7	Alan Kulwicki	AK Racing	Ford	500	3	running	160	$11,605
6	1	33	Harry Gant	Mach 1 Racing	Chevrolet	500	1	running	155	$9,060
7	16	21	Kyle Petty	Wood Brothers Racing	Ford	500	51	running	151	$6,350
8	8	26	Morgan Shepherd	King Racing	Buick	499	42	running	147	$5,580
9	13	11	Terry Labonte	Junior Johnson & Associates	Chevrolet	499	0	running	138	$9,800
10	24	18	Dale Jarrett (R)	Freedlander Motorsports	Chevrolet	497	0	running	0	$7,845
11	10	75	Neil Bonnett	RahMoc Enterprises	Pontiac	492	0	running	130	$4,860
12	12	17	Darrell Waltrip	Hendrick Motorsports	Chevrolet	490	0	running	127	$1,850
13	23	30	Michael Waltrip	Bahari Racing	Pontiac	487	0	running	124	$5,500
14	25	12	Slick Johnson	Hamby Racing	Chevrolet	487	0	running	121	$4,290
15	28	6	D. K. Ulrich	U.S. Racing	Chevrolet	483	0	running	118	$4,380
16	2	27	Rusty Wallace	Blue Max Racing	Pontiac	479	42	running	120	$8,710
17	7	90	Ken Schrader	Donlavey Racing	Ford	451	0	running	112	$3,660
18	29	81	Mike Potter	Fillip Racing	Ford	450	0	running	109	$1,430
19	4	5	Geoff Bodine	Hendrick Motorsports	Chevrolet	436	5	crash	111	$7,190
20	19	55	Phil Parsons	Jackson Bros. Motorsports	Oldsmobile	419	0	running	103	$1,950
21	26	70	J. D. McDuffie	McDuffie Racing	Pontiac	406	0	engine	100	$1,260
22	27	64	Jerry Cranmer	Langley Racing	Ford	392	0	running	97	$3,400
23	6	22	Bobby Allison	Stavola Brothers Racing	Buick	289	0	crash	94	$6,880
24	14	44	Sterling Marlin	Hagan Racing	Oldsmobile	252	54	crash	96	$4,060
25	22	67	Eddie Bierschwale	Arrington Racing	Ford	209	0	crash	88	$3,360
26	20	8	Bobby Hillin Jr.	Stavola Brothers Racing	Buick	195	0	engine	85	$6,770
27	17	71	Dave Marcis	Marcis Auto Racing	Chevrolet	168	18	crash	87	$2,540
28	9	35	Benny Parsons	Hendrick Motorsports	Chevrolet	168	0	crash	79	$8,910
29	21	52	Jimmy Means	Jimmy Means Racing	Pontiac	127	0	crash	76	$2,480
30	30	41	Ronnie Thomas	Ronnie Thomas Racing	Chevrolet	77	0	engine	73	$950
Failed to qualify
31		48	Tony Spanos	Hylton Motorsports	Chevrolet					
Official race results

== Standings after the race ==
Drivers' Championship standings

	Pos	Driver	Points
	1	Dale Earnhardt	1,205
	2	Bill Elliott	1,078 (-127)
1	3	Richard Petty	1,008 (-197)
1	4	Neil Bonnett	1,000 (–205)
	5	Ricky Rudd	970 (–235)
1	6	Terry Labonte	923 (–282)
1	7	Darrell Waltrip	917 (–288)
3	8	Kyle Petty	902 (–303)
1	9	Rusty Wallace	886 (–319)
1	10	Ken Schrader	882 (–323)
Official driver's standings

- Note: Only the first 10 positions are included for the driver standings.

Previous race: 1987 First Union 400	NASCAR Winston Cup Series; 1987 season	Next race: 1987 Sovran Bank 500
