= Bert Baker =

Bert or Bertram Bak(k)er may refer to:

- Bert Baker, character in Springtime in the Sierras
- Bertram Baker (1898–1985), member of the New York State Assembly
- Bert Bakker (1912–1969), Dutch writer and publisher
- Bert Baker (Illinois politician) (1923–1984), Illinois politician

== See also ==
- Albert Baker (disambiguation)
- Robert Baker (disambiguation)
- Herbert Baker (disambiguation)
