= Bob Baker Marionette Theater =

Los Angeles Historic-Cultural Monument

Coordinates: 34.121748°N 118.207231°W

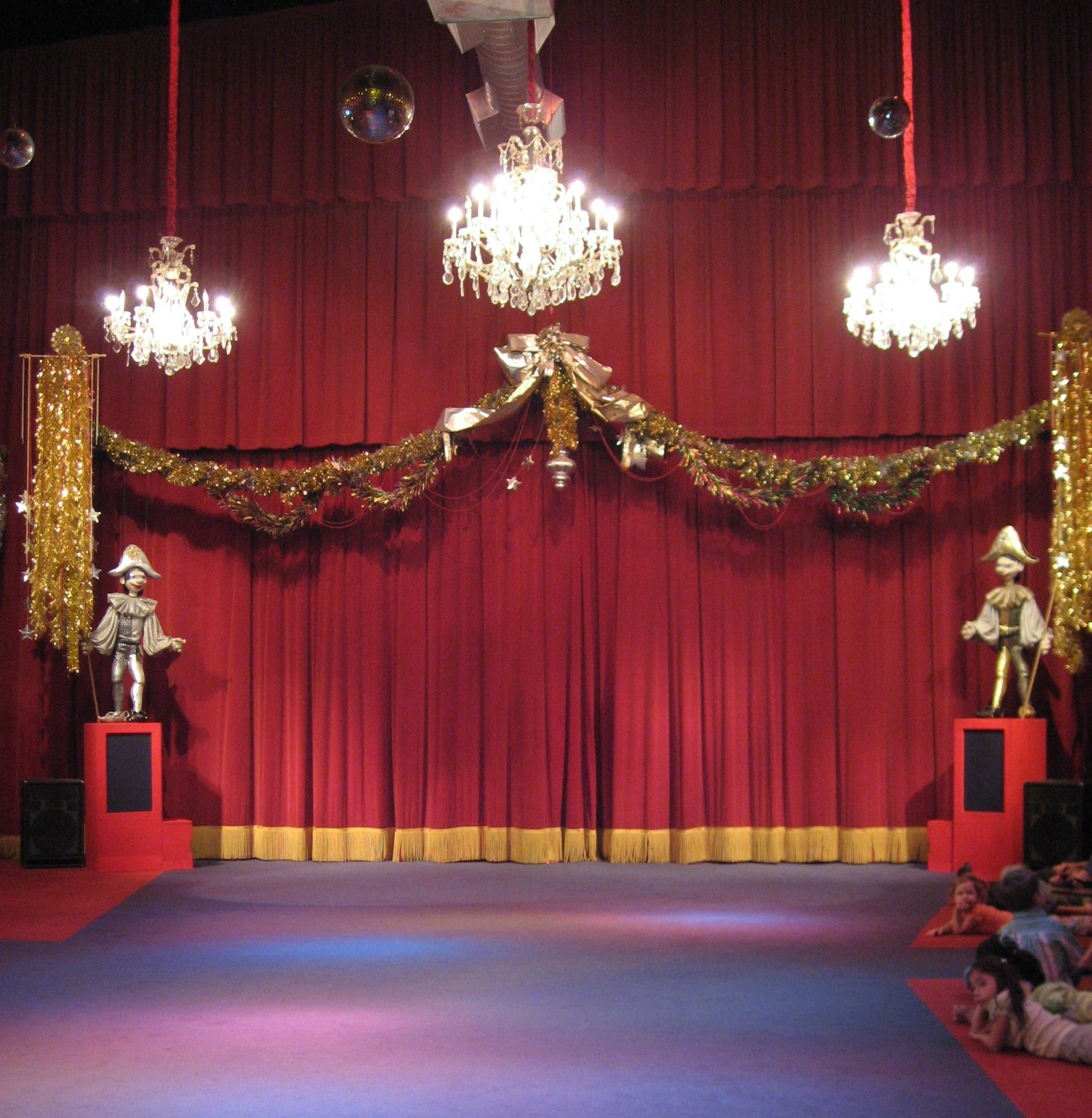
- Stage at the original location of the Bob Baker Marionette Theater

- Location within California
- Location: 4949 York Blvd, Los Angeles

History
- Built: 1923

Site notes
- Architectural style: Vernacular architecture

Los Angeles Historic-Cultural Monument
- Designated: 2009
- Reference no.: 958

The Bob Baker Marionette Theater, founded by Bob Baker and Alton Wood in 1963, is the longest continuous running puppet theater in the United States. In June 2009, the theater was designated as a Los Angeles Historic-Cultural Monument. In early 2019, the theater moved to a new permanent home on York Boulevard.

== History ==
While attending Hollywood High School, Bob Baker began manufacturing toy marionettes that sold both in Europe and the United States. After graduation he became an apprentice at the George Pal Animation Studios. A year later he was promoted to head animator of Puppetoons. After World War II, Baker served as an animation advisor at many film studios, including Disney. His puppetry was featured on TV in Bewitched, Star Trek, Mister Rogers' Neighborhood, Land of the Giants and NCIS; and on film in Bluebeard, A Star Is Born, G.I. Blues, Disney's Bedknobs and Broomsticks and Close Encounters of the Third Kind.

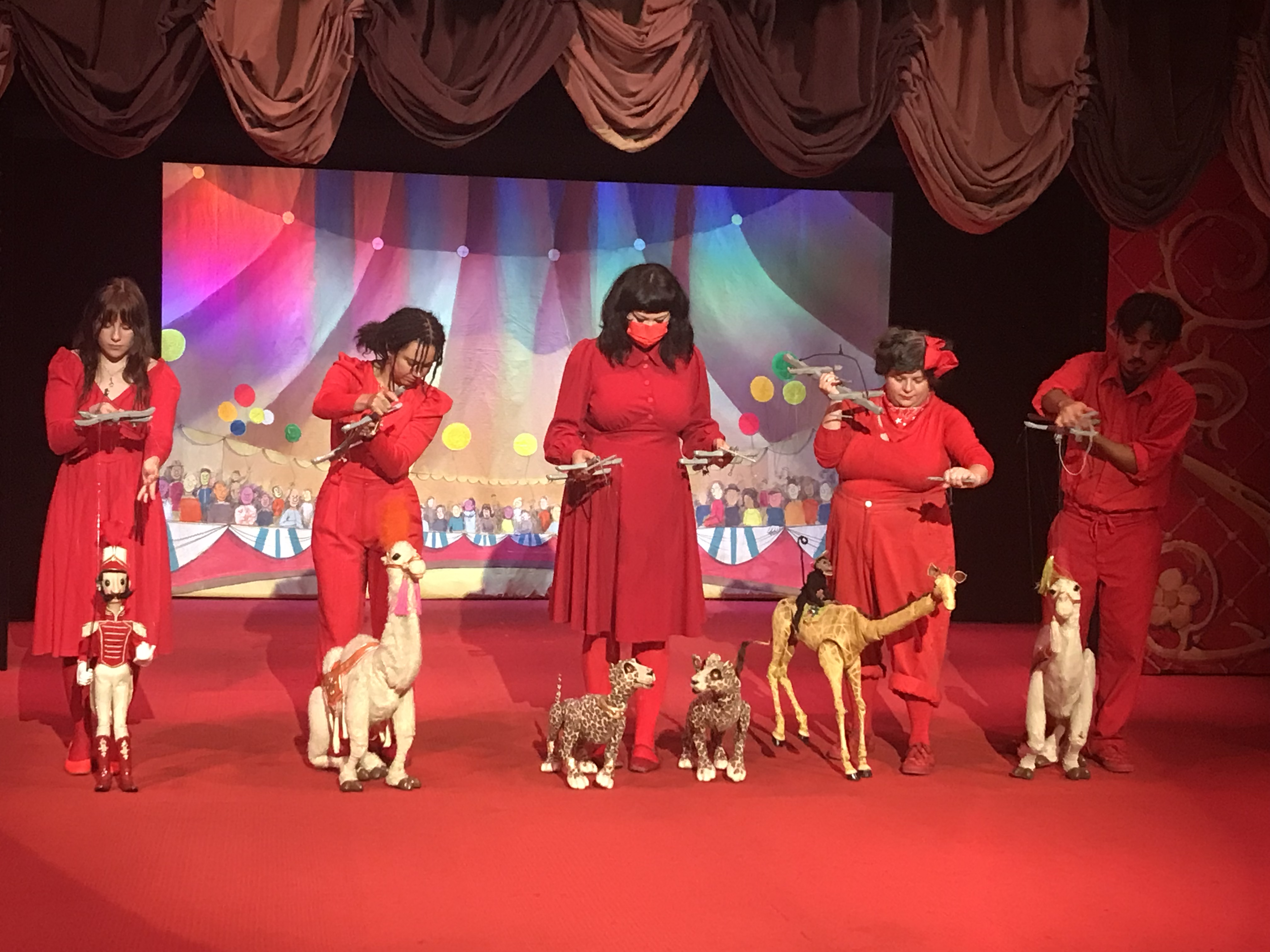
A BBMT production of The Circus

In 1963, Baker and Alton Wood opened a live puppet theater and permanent showcase for their hand-crafted marionettes. Originally built as a scene shop for special effects artist M.B. Paul, the theater was located on 1st Street in downtown Los Angeles. The theater remained in this location until 2019.

In June 2009, the Los Angeles City Council designated the theater as an historic monument. The Los Angeles Times described the scene:

A parade of puppets strung along Los Angeles City Council members today long enough to persuade them to designate a West 1st Street marionette theater a historic cultural landmark. The puppets danced and pranced around the City Council’s ornate horseshoe-shaped desk in the City Hall chambers before officials voted 14–0 to place the Bob Baker Marionette Theater on the city’s landmark list.

Baker died on November 28, 2014, at the age of 90 from natural causes.

In 2019, The Bob Baker Marionette Theater gained 501(c)3 non-profit status, and relocated into a 1920s silent movie theater in Highland Park. Inspired by Bob Baker's original renderings, the new space has been transformed into "The Place Where Imagination Dwells".

In addition to hosting their BBMT productions, Bob Baker Marionette Theater houses special events, artistic collaborations, musical events with Sid the Cat, and more. Their annual Bob Baker Day at LA Historic State Park celebrates the legacy of Bob Baker, inviting thousands of guests for a free festival featuring puppets, interdisciplinary arts, and community programs.

In May 2026, The Bob Baker Marionette Theater debuted "Choo Choo Revue", their first original show in 45 years featuring 100 new puppets. The theater is preparing a special performance for the 2028 Los Angeles Olympics.

== Gallery ==
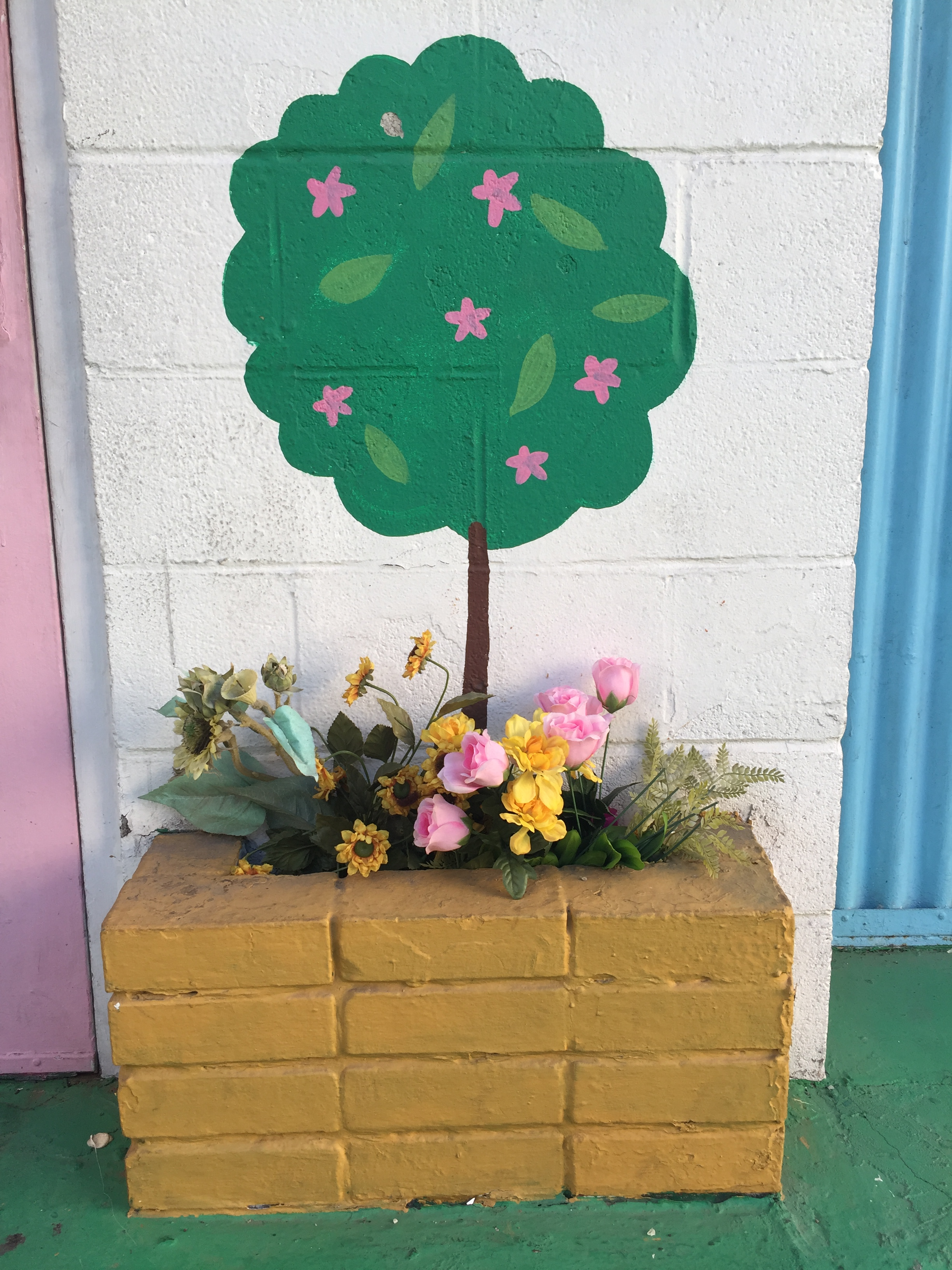
Planter box

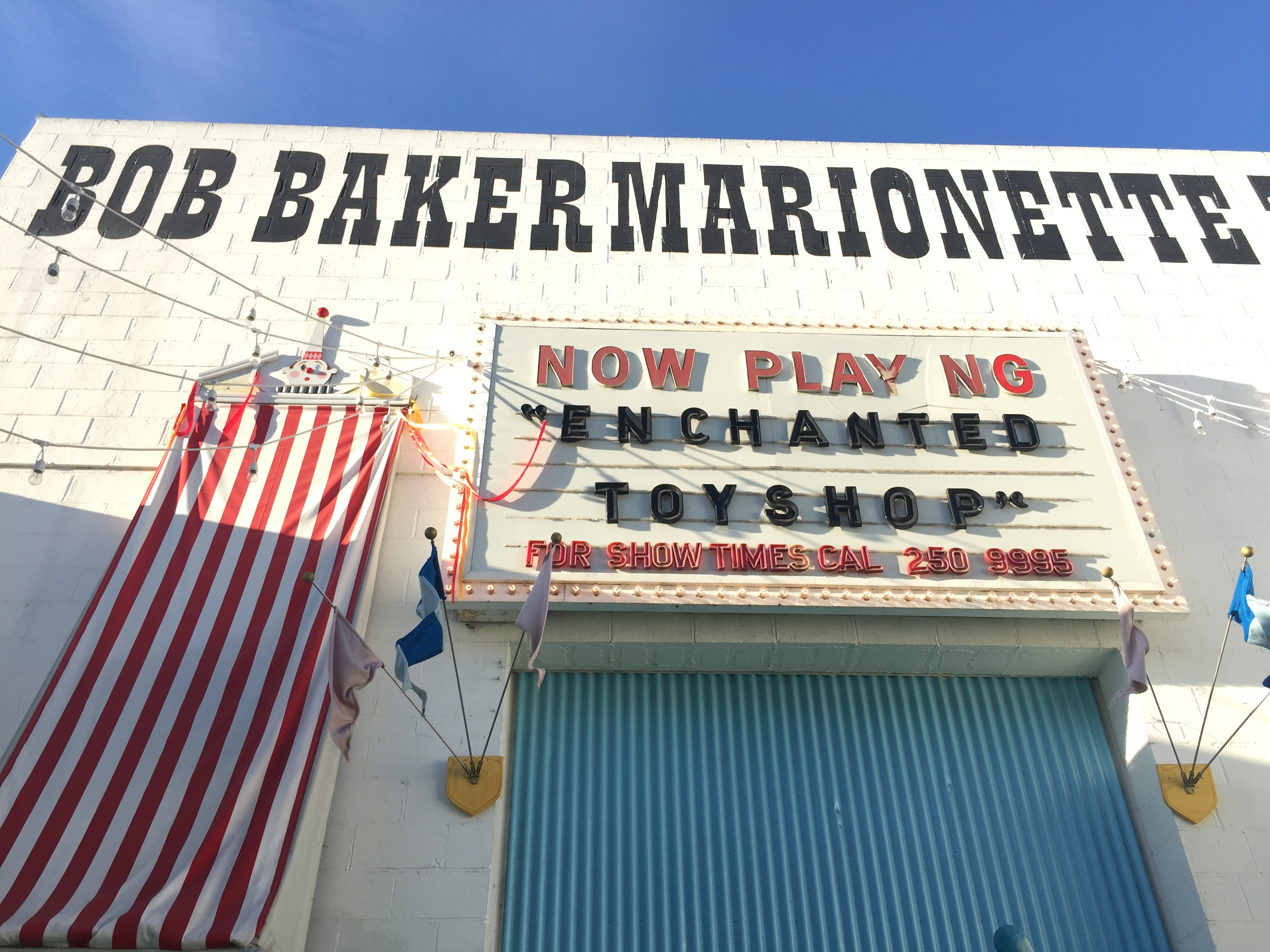
Original location

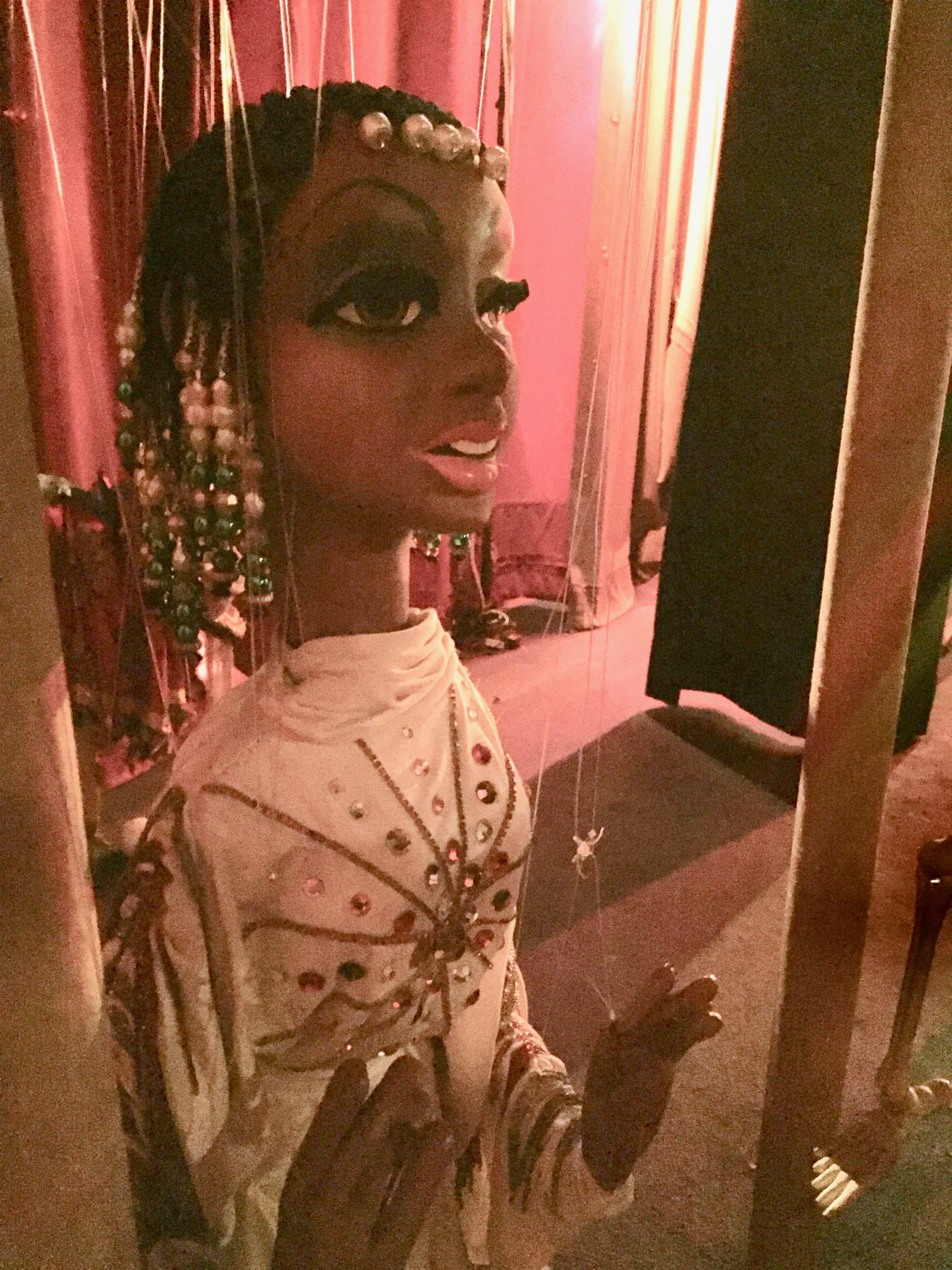
An Egyptian woman marionette

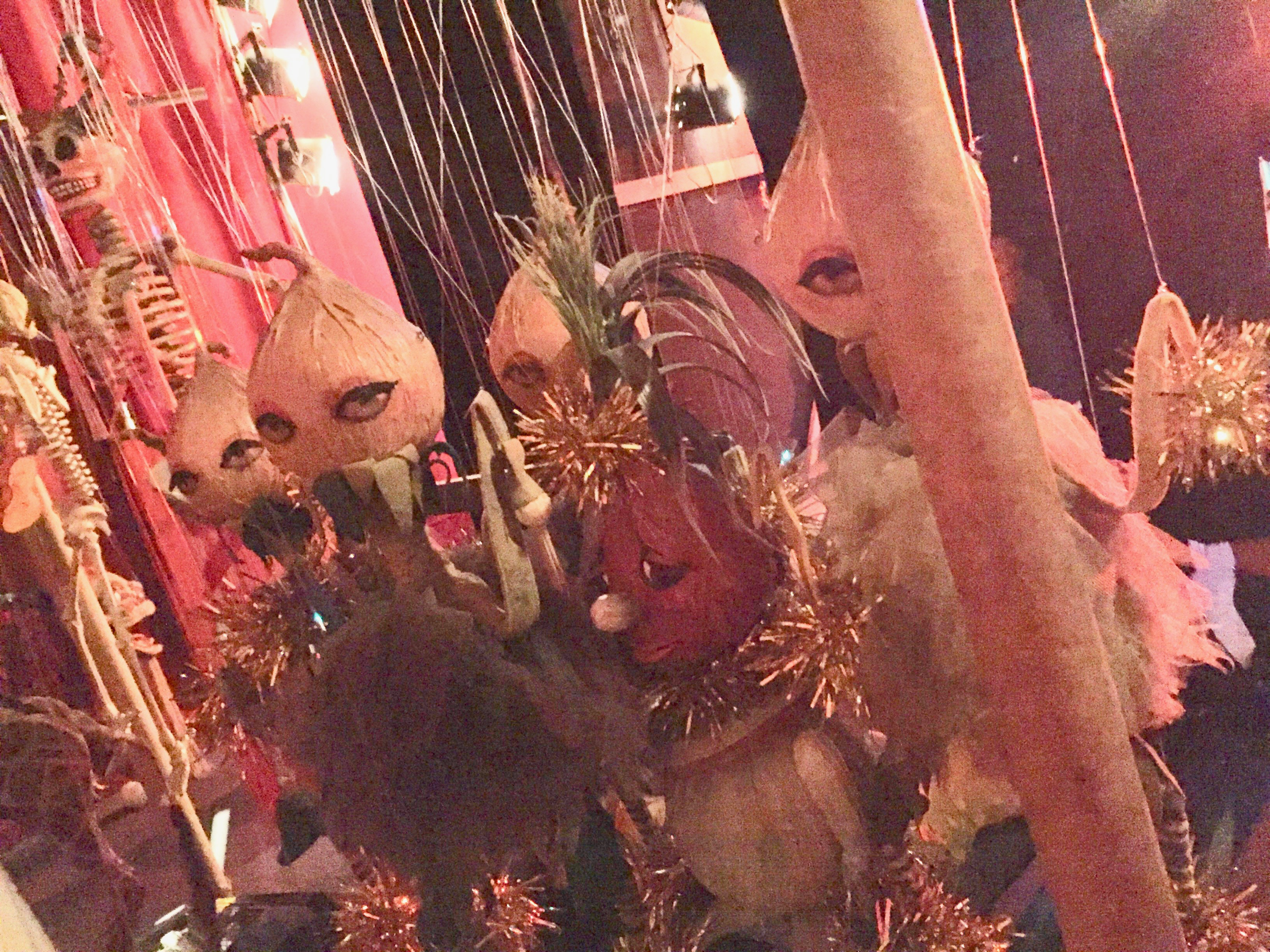
Anthropomorphic onion marionettes

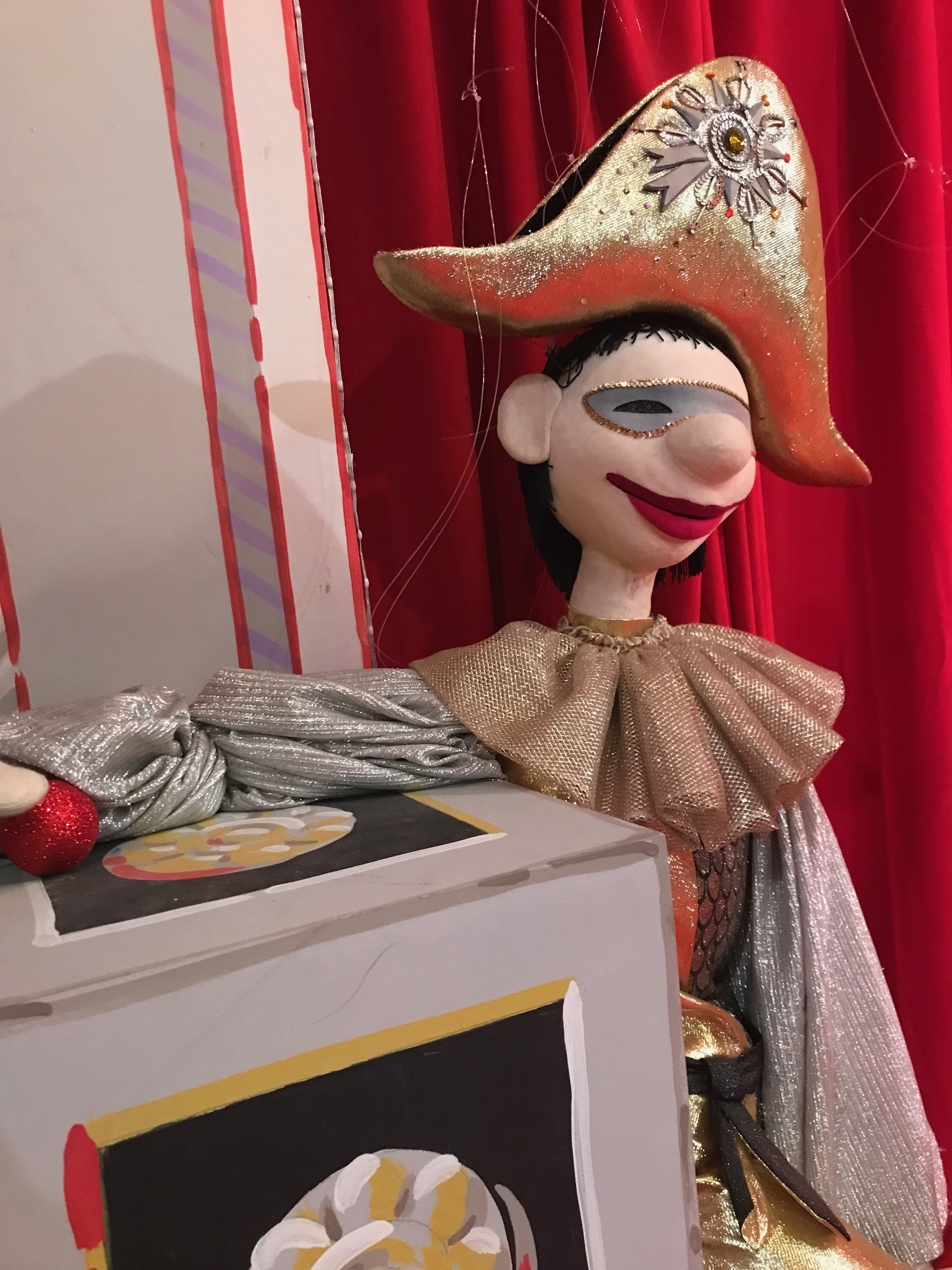
Another marionette

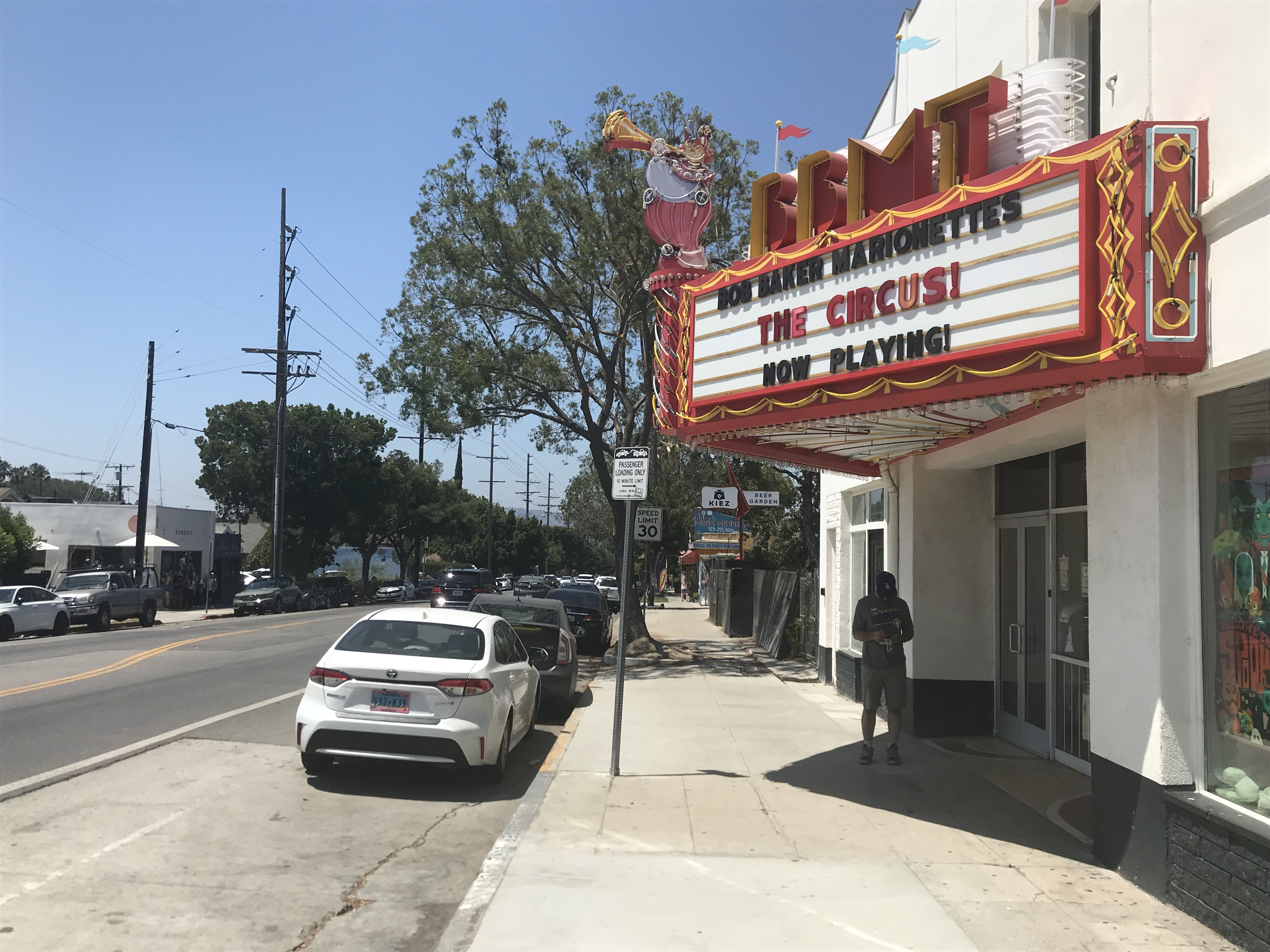
Marquee

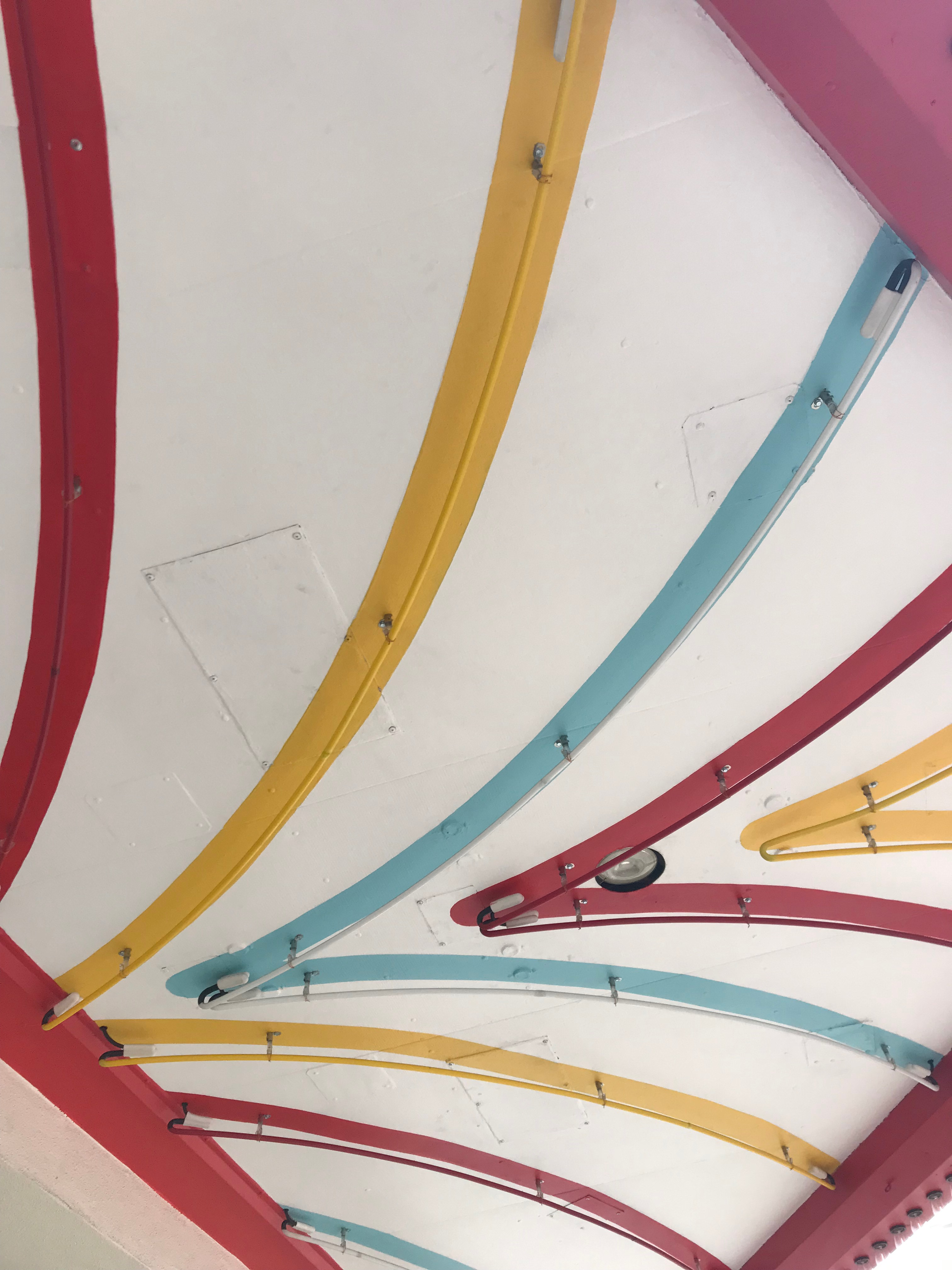
Neonwork underneath the theater's marquee

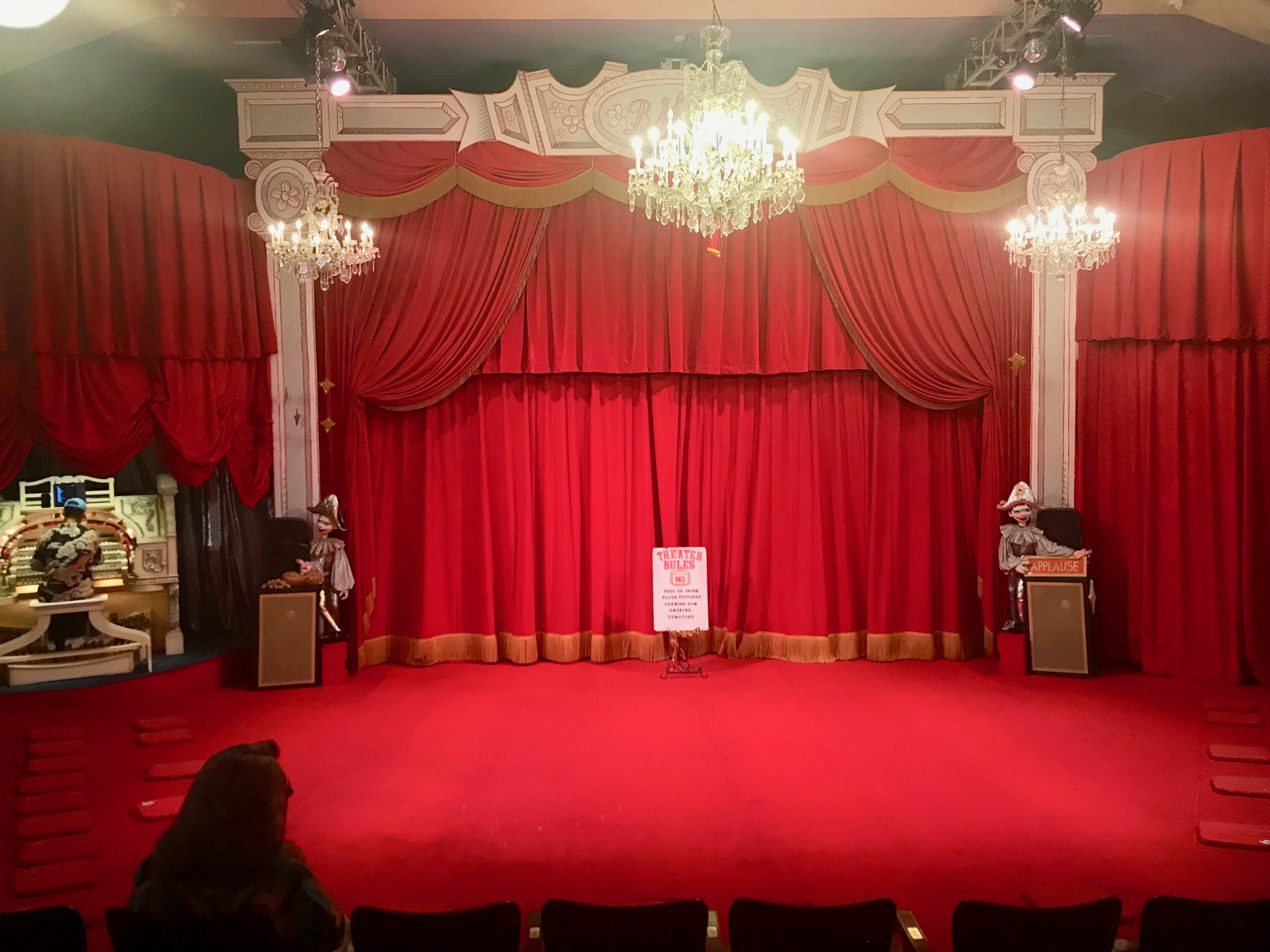
The new auditorium

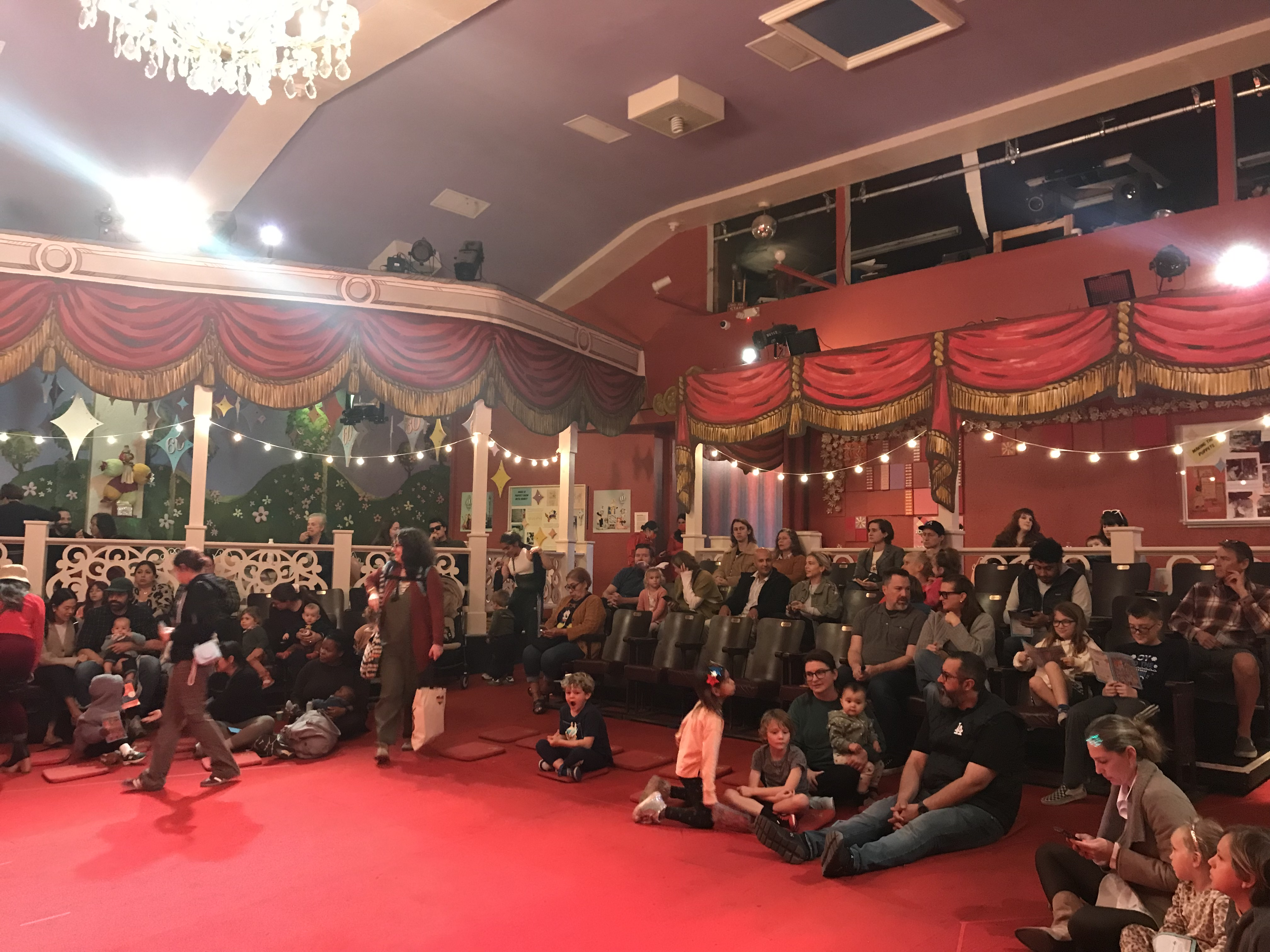
The interior of the Highland Park location

== See also ==
- List of Los Angeles Historic-Cultural Monuments in the Wilshire and Westlake areas
- Le Theatre de Marionette
