= Le Theatre de Marionette =

Marionette theater in Dallas, Texas, US

Coordinates: 32.800001°N 96.829264°W

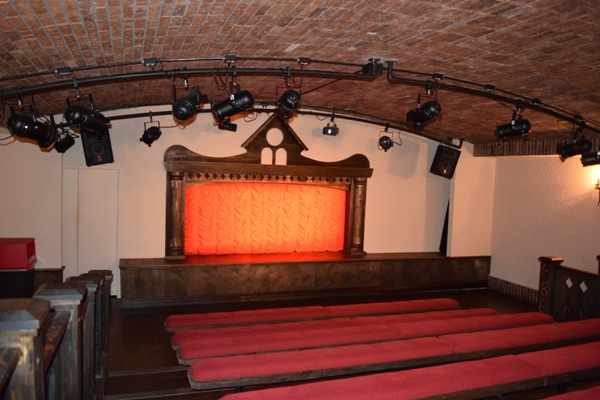
- Front of Marionette Stage, 2014, Geppetto's Theater
- Formation: 1991
- Type: Theatre group
- Location: Hilton Anatole Hotel, 2201 N Stemmons Frwy, Dallas, TX
- Website: Official website

Le Theatre de Marionette is a marionette theater and production company that began in Arlington, Texas and, later, moved to Dallas, Texas. The theater, which caters to festivals, amusement parks, libraries and museums operated both in a physical location (Geppetto's Marionette Theater in Dallas) and as a touring group.

Today, Le Théâtre produces over 200 performances annually and maintains an inventory of hundreds of handcrafted marionettes, each built with meticulous detail and designed for both intimate and large-stage environments.

Supported in part by the Texas Commission on the Arts, Le Théâtre continues to expand its reach through touring, residencies, and large-scale installations, positioning itself as one of the leading marionette production companies in the United States.

== History ==
The theatre opened in Arlington, Texas, in 1992. The theater was founded by John Hopkins, a former puppeteer with Sid and Marty Krofft Television and Six Flags Over Texas, and Pady Blackwood, of Howdy Doody fame and former Bil Baird artist. The theater was created by converting the former Greyhound bus station in downtown Arlington into a miniature stage that housed a bridge stage with a fly rail system, seating for 80 persons, concession counter, and a small retail gift shop. The theater catered to families and children, as well as welcomed child care organizations, schools field trips, and other youth organizations. Unlike most theaters, the company structure was for profit. The primary income source for the theater was ticket sales derived through group bookings. The shows the first season included Hansel and Gretel, Aladdin, and The Wizard of Oz. Although popular with local families, the theater experienced a sluggish start. In the 4th year of operation, the landlord raised the rent and the theater became financially unstable when sales stalled during non-peak seasons. In 1995, an agreement was made to move the theater to Dallas, and the Arlington location closed in 1996.

=== Le Theatre de Marionette at NorthPark Center and Ridgmar Mall ===
In 1995, Le Theatre de Marionette was invited to join NorthPark Center in Dallas. An agreement was made with the mall management and construction of a marionette theater began in September 1995. The theater opened the week of Thanksgiving in 1995, with Hopkins and Blackwood as the key managing figures, and Hopkins as the actual theater owner. In 1996, amidst internal conflicts, Blackwood left Le Theatre de Marionette to start his own company. In January 1997, Hopkins sold the NorthPark Le Theatre de Marionette to John Hardman who continued to operate the theater with his other theatrical operations, including an annual marionette show, The World on a String, performed at the State Fair of Texas, and seasonal shows for NorthPark center. Hopkins and Hardman continued to work together with Hopkins maintaining a production role and Hardman tending to the day-to-day operation of the theater. In 1999, a second Le Theatre de Marionette was opened at Ridgmar Mall in Fort Worth, TX by Hopkins in a joint venture with Shopco Group of New York, as part of the mall expansion and renovation. The theater was located in the newly-remodeled wing of the mall. Like the Dallas location, the theater was located directly next to prominent retailer Neiman Marcus. In 2002, amid fears arising from the recent 9/11 attacks, and subsequent loss of business, the theater announced a sudden and abrupt closure as a temporary measure. Within six months, it was decided to not reopen the Fort Worth location. In 2003, the NorthPark theater closed normal operation when the mall began a massive remodeling. The theater opened annually for Christmas for two additional years before closing permanently in 2005. In 2004, John Hardman sold his interests in Le Theatre de Marionette to a Dallas circus performer, Dick Monday, who attempted to open a similar operation at a competing Dallas mall, the Galleria. The new business was called Slappy's Playhouse and had no actual affiliation with Le Theatre de Marionette. Slappy's Playhouse closed in 2010, citing lack of business to sustain the operation.

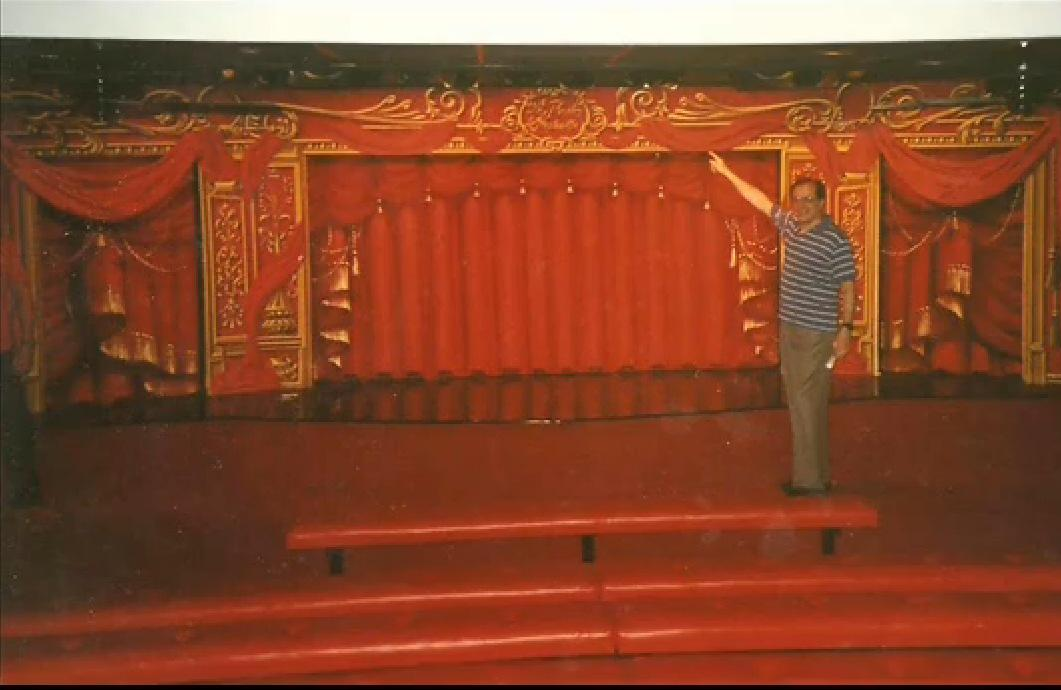
Nick Coppola Stands in front of proscenium at Le Theatre de Marionette, 1994.

=== Le Theatre de Marionette as a touring company ===
In 2005, Kent Williams, a local Dallas voice actor, kabuki artist, and puppeteer entered into agreements with John Hopkins and John Hardman to retrieve and refurbish the shows and tour the programs in local schools, museums, and other cultural centers with grants made in part by ArtsPartners Texas Commission on the Arts. In 2006, Le Theatre de Marionette became a roster presenter for Big Thought. In 2007, John Hopkins regained control of the company and transformed Le Theatre de Marionette into a touring and production company with Kent Williams as the newly founded director of education. The duo teamed with Todd Haberkorn, a Dallas voice actor and film director who contributed audio and video production experience to enhance the stage quality of the productions and projects. The focus of the new company was larger stage shows and commercially viable events. The theater company continued to build on previous shows and launched their first large stage show, The Little Mermaid in 2013, at the Historic Palace Theater in Grapevine, Texas. Le Theatre de Marionette continued to expand into markets beyond schools, libraries, and museums. Since 2013, Le Theatre de Marionette has produced shows for special events with an emphasis on holiday programs and restaged classic children's fairy tales.

In 2014, Le Theatre de Marionette entered into an agreement with Hilton Hotels and Crow Holdings to open Geppetto's Marionette Theater inside the Hilton Anatole in Dallas. As part of the hotel's strategic move to cater to families, Hilton announced the collaboration in June 2014.

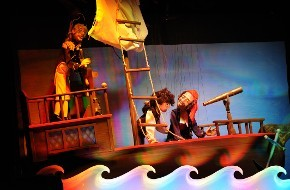

Le Theatre de Marionette performs over 200 shows per year outside their theater home, Geppetto's Marionette Theater. Most of their performances are designed for schools, libraries, and museums. In 2015, Le Theatre started construction of touring stages and explored other puppetry mediums including black art puppetry, large body puppets and shows geared for larger arenas.

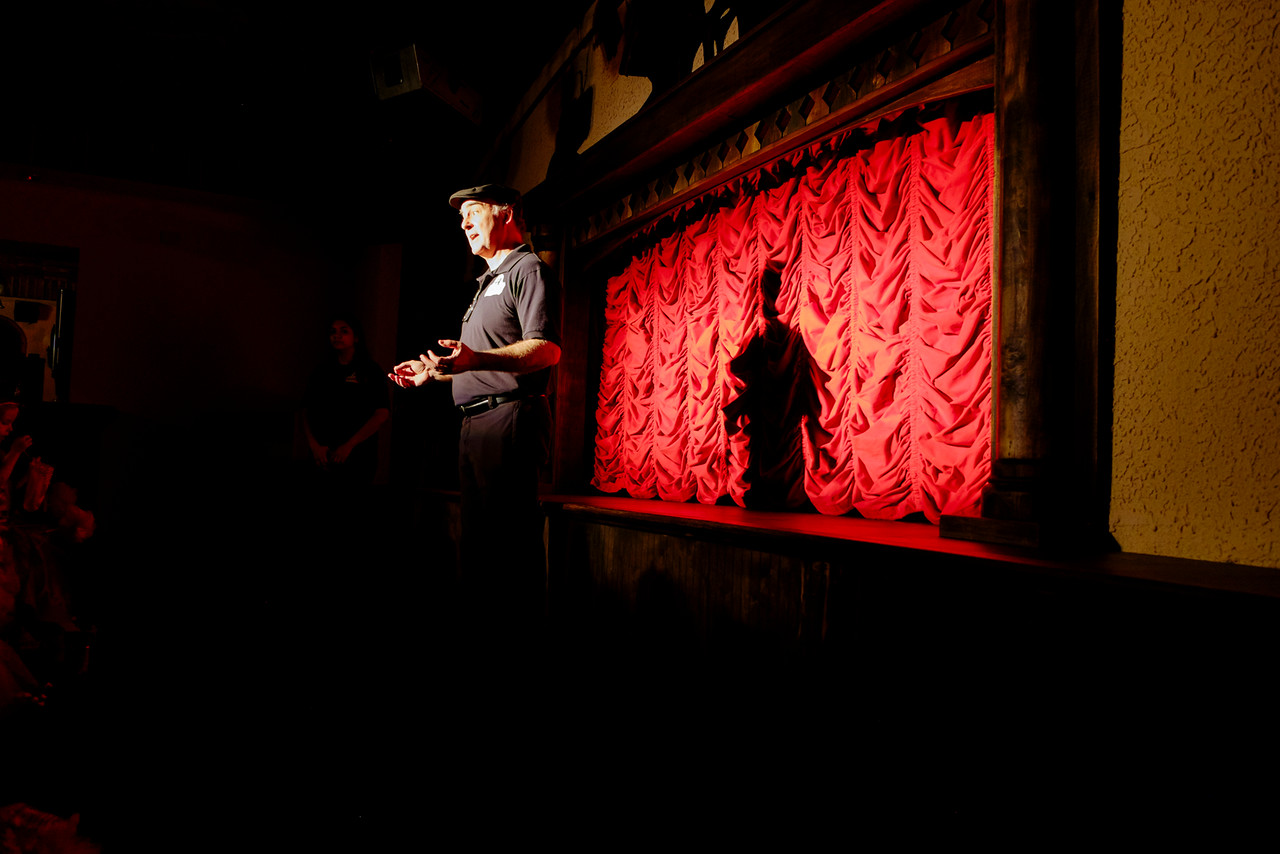
Kent Williams Speaks to the audience before the show

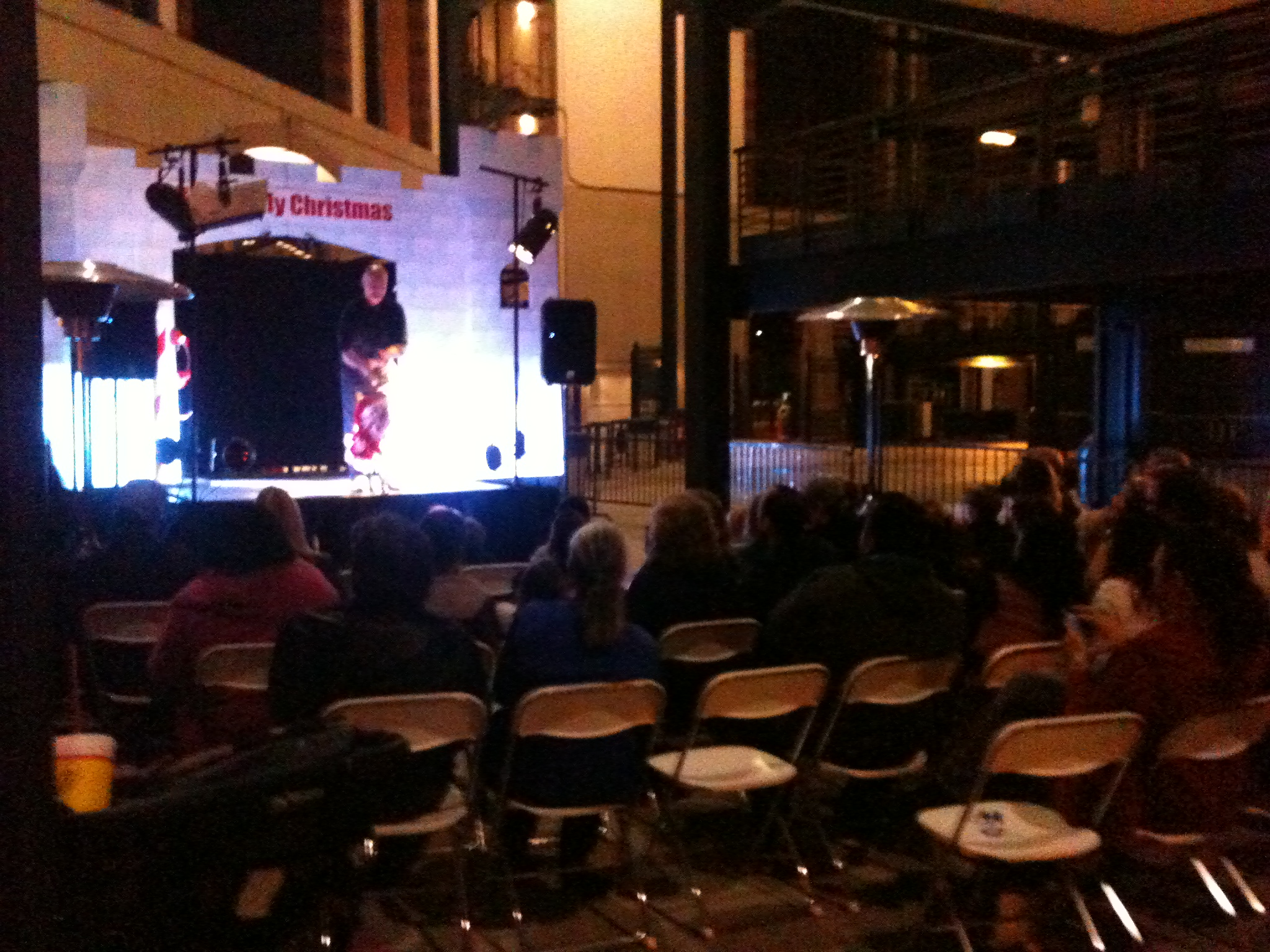
Holiday show set-up at Christkindl, Arlington, 2013

=== Le Theatre at State Fair of Texas, 2019 - Present ===
Since establishing a dedicated presence at the Fair, the company has introduced experiences such as ¡Fiestas de Marionetas!, a vibrant, village-style production featuring more than 85–100 handcrafted marionettes celebrating Latin American culture through music, dance, and storytelling.

This production is staged in a custom-built environment and designed to accommodate high-volume audiences. With millions of annual visitors to the State Fair, Le Théâtre’s programming serves as both a cultural attraction and a unique live entertainment offering.

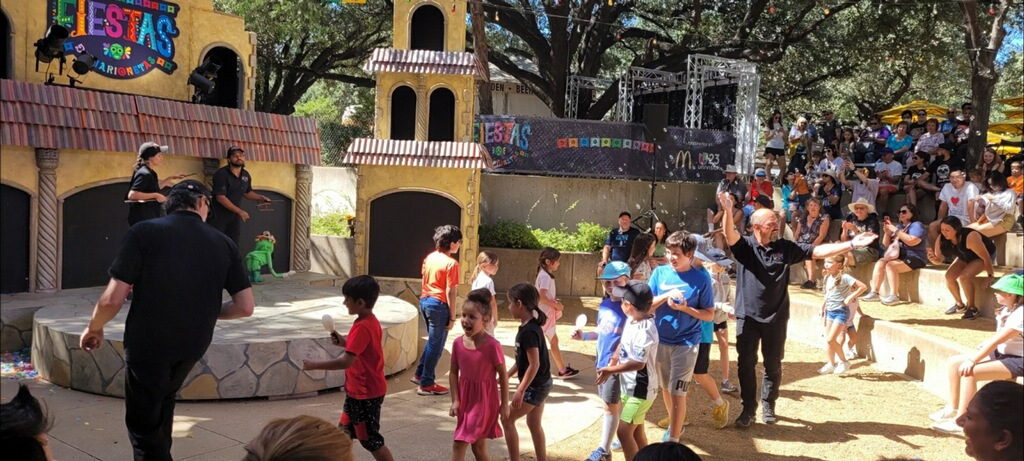

=== See also ===
- Salzburg Marionette Theatre
- Bob Baker Marionette Theater
- Sid and Marty Krofft
- Six Flags Over Texas
- Children's Television Workshop
- The Muppets (TV series)
- Jim Henson
