= Herbert Baker (disambiguation) =

Herbert Baker (1862–1946) was a British architect.

Herbert Baker may also refer to:

- Herbert Baker (cricketer) (1880–1958), English first-class cricketer
- Herbert Baker (politician) (1866–1941), Canadian politician in Alberta
- Herbert Baker (screenwriter) (1920–1983), American songwriter and screenwriter
- Herbert Brereton Baker (1862–1935), British inorganic chemist
- Herbert G. Baker (1920–2001), British-American botanist
- Herbert F. Baker (1862–1930), American politician in the Michigan Legislature

== See also ==
- Bert Baker (disambiguation)
