= 1987 Sovran Bank 500 =

Eighth race of the 1987 NASCAR Winston Cup Series

Race details
- Race 8 of 29 in the 1987 NASCAR Winston Cup Series
- The 1987 Sovran Bank 500 program cover.
- Date: April 26, 1987
- Official name: 38th Annual Sovran Bank 500
- Location: Martinsville, Virginia, Martinsville Speedway
- Course: Permanent racing facility
- Course length: 0.526 miles (0.847 km)
- Distance: 500 laps, 263 mi (423.257 km)
- Scheduled distance: 500 laps, 263 mi (423.257 km)
- Average speed: 72.808 miles per hour (117.173 km/h)
- Attendance: 40,000

Pole position
Driver	Morgan Shepherd	King Racing
- Time: 20.728

Most laps led
Driver	Dale Earnhardt	Richard Childress Racing
- Laps: 156

Winner
No. 3	Dale Earnhardt	Richard Childress Racing

Television in the United States
- Network: SETN
- Announcers: Eli Gold, Jerry Punch

Radio in the United States
- Radio: Motor Racing Network

The 1987 Sovran Bank 500 was the eighth stock car race of the 1987 NASCAR Winston Cup Series season and the 38th iteration of the event. The race was held on Sunday, April 26, 1987, before an audience of 40,000 in Martinsville, Virginia at Martinsville Speedway, a 0.526 miles (0.847 km) permanent oval-shaped short track. The race took the scheduled 500 laps to complete.

Taking advantage of a misfortunate Geoff Bodine, who spun from a large lead over the field with 17 laps in the race, Richard Childress Racing's Dale Earnhardt managed to hold the lead after Bodine's spin to take his 26th career NASCAR Winston Cup Series victory, his sixth victory of the season, and his fourth straight victory, increasing his driver's championship points lead to 157 points. To fill out the top three, Blue Max Racing's Rusty Wallace and the aforementioned Geoff Bodine finished second and third, respectively.

== Background ==
The layout of Martinsville Speedway, the venue where the race was held.

Martinsville Speedway is a NASCAR-owned stock car racing track located in Henry County, in Ridgeway, Virginia, just to the south of Martinsville. At 0.526 miles (0.847 km) in length, it is the shortest track in the NASCAR Cup Series. The track was also one of the first paved oval tracks in NASCAR, being built in 1947 by H. Clay Earles. It is also the only remaining race track that has been on the NASCAR circuit from its beginning in 1948.

=== Entry list ===
- (R) denotes rookie driver.

#	Driver	Team	Make	Sponsor
3	Dale Earnhardt	Richard Childress Racing	Chevrolet	Wrangler
5	Geoff Bodine	Hendrick Motorsports	Chevrolet	Levi Garrett
7	Alan Kulwicki	AK Racing	Ford	Zerex
8	Bobby Hillin Jr.	Stavola Brothers Racing	Buick	Miller American
9	Bill Elliott	Melling Racing	Ford	Coors
11	Terry Labonte	Junior Johnson & Associates	Chevrolet	Budweiser
12	Slick Johnson	Hamby Racing	Chevrolet	Hesco Exhaust Systems
15	Ricky Rudd	Bud Moore Engineering	Ford	Motorcraft Quality Parts
17	Darrell Waltrip	Hendrick Motorsports	Chevrolet	Tide
18	Dale Jarrett (R)	Freedlander Motorsports	Chevrolet	Freedlander Financial
19	Derrike Cope (R)	Stoke Racing	Chevrolet	Stoke Racing
21	Kyle Petty	Wood Brothers Racing	Ford	Citgo
22	Bobby Allison	Stavola Brothers Racing	Buick	Miller American
26	Morgan Shepherd	King Racing	Buick	Quaker State
27	Rusty Wallace	Blue Max Racing	Pontiac	Kodiak
30	Michael Waltrip	Bahari Racing	Chevrolet	Bahari Racing
33	Harry Gant	Mach 1 Racing	Chevrolet	Skoal Bandit
35	Benny Parsons	Hendrick Motorsports	Chevrolet	Folgers
43	Richard Petty	Petty Enterprises	Pontiac	STP
44	Sterling Marlin	Hagan Racing	Oldsmobile	Piedmont Airlines
48	Tony Spanos	Hylton Motorsports	Chevrolet	Hylton Motorsports
52	Jimmy Means	Jimmy Means Racing	Pontiac	Turtle Wax
55	Phil Parsons	Jackson Bros. Motorsports	Oldsmobile	Copenhagen
62	Steve Christman (R)	Winkle Motorsports	Pontiac	AC Spark Plug
64	Jerry Cranmer	Langley Racing	Ford	Sunny King Ford
67	Eddie Bierschwale	Arrington Racing	Ford	Pannill Sweatshirts
70	J. D. McDuffie	McDuffie Racing	Pontiac	Rumple Furniture
71	Dave Marcis	Marcis Auto Racing	Chevrolet	Lifebuoy
75	Neil Bonnett	RahMoc Enterprises	Pontiac	Valvoline
81	Buddy Arrington	Fillip Racing	Ford	Pannill Sweatshirts
90	Ken Schrader	Donlavey Racing	Ford	Red Baron Frozen Pizza

== Qualifying ==
Qualifying was originally scheduled to be split into two rounds. The first round was held on Thursday, April 23, at 2:00 pm EST. Originally, the first 20 positions were going to be determined by first round qualifying, with positions 21–30 meant to be determined the following day on Friday, April 24. However, due to rain, the second round was cancelled. As a result, the rest of the starting lineup was set using the results from the first round. Depending on who needed it, a select amount of positions were given to cars that had not otherwise qualified but were high enough in owner's points; up to two were given.

Morgan Shepherd, driving for King Racing, won the pole, setting a time of 20.728 for an average speed of 91.355 miles per hour (147.022 km/h).

No drivers failed to qualify.

=== Full qualifying results ===
Pos.	#	Driver	Team	Make	Time	Speed
1	26	Morgan Shepherd	King Racing	Buick	20.728	91.355
2	11	Terry Labonte	Junior Johnson & Associates	Chevrolet	20.737	91.315
3	33	Harry Gant	Mach 1 Racing	Chevrolet	20.761	91.209
4	3	Dale Earnhardt	Richard Childress Racing	Chevrolet	20.786	91.100
5	27	Rusty Wallace	Blue Max Racing	Pontiac	20.820	90.951
6	21	Kyle Petty	Wood Brothers Racing	Ford	20.832	90.899
7	5	Geoff Bodine	Hendrick Motorsports	Chevrolet	20.868	90.742
8	7	Alan Kulwicki	AK Racing	Ford	20.869	90.737
9	75	Neil Bonnett	RahMoc Enterprises	Pontiac	20.869	90.737
10	43	Richard Petty	Petty Enterprises	Pontiac	20.907	90.573
11	17	Darrell Waltrip	Hendrick Motorsports	Chevrolet	20.913	90.547
12	71	Dave Marcis	Marcis Auto Racing	Chevrolet	20.939	90.434
13	22	Bobby Allison	Stavola Brothers Racing	Buick	20.953	90.374
14	18	Dale Jarrett (R)	Freedlander Motorsports	Chevrolet	20.966	90.318
15	15	Ricky Rudd	Bud Moore Engineering	Ford	20.969	90.305
16	81	Buddy Arrington	Fillip Racing	Ford	21.004	90.154
17	35	Benny Parsons	Hendrick Motorsports	Chevrolet	21.030	90.043
18	30	Michael Waltrip	Bahari Racing	Chevrolet	21.052	89.949
19	55	Phil Parsons	Jackson Bros. Motorsports	Oldsmobile	21.079	89.833
20	90	Ken Schrader	Donlavey Racing	Ford	21.128	89.625
21	44	Sterling Marlin	Hagan Racing	Oldsmobile	21.158	89.498
22	8	Bobby Hillin Jr.	Stavola Brothers Racing	Buick	21.199	89.325
23	64	Jerry Cranmer	Langley Racing	Ford	21.329	88.781
24	62	Steve Christman (R)	Winkle Motorsports	Pontiac	21.356	88.668
25	67	Eddie Bierschwale	Arrington Racing	Ford	21.404	88.469
26	52	Jimmy Means	Jimmy Means Racing	Pontiac	21.437	88.333
27	70	J. D. McDuffie	McDuffie Racing	Pontiac	21.487	88.128
28	12	Slick Johnson	Hamby Racing	Oldsmobile	21.523	87.980
29	19	Derrike Cope (R)	Stoke Racing	Chevrolet	21.578	87.756
30	48	Tony Spanos	Hylton Motorsports	Chevrolet	23.044	82.173
Provisional
31	9	Bill Elliott	Melling Racing	Ford	-	-
Official first round qualifying results
Official starting lineup

== Race results ==
Fin	St	#	Driver	Team	Make	Laps	Led	Status	Pts	Winnings
1	4	3	Dale Earnhardt	Richard Childress Racing	Chevrolet	500	156	running	185	$50,850
2	5	27	Rusty Wallace	Blue Max Racing	Pontiac	500	63	running	175	$27,325
3	7	5	Geoff Bodine	Hendrick Motorsports	Chevrolet	500	116	running	170	$20,750
4	19	55	Phil Parsons	Jackson Bros. Motorsports	Oldsmobile	500	0	running	160	$10,275
5	2	11	Terry Labonte	Junior Johnson & Associates	Chevrolet	498	0	running	155	$16,425
6	31	9	Bill Elliott	Melling Racing	Ford	498	66	running	155	$12,950
7	20	90	Ken Schrader	Donlavey Racing	Ford	498	0	running	146	$8,280
8	13	22	Bobby Allison	Stavola Brothers Racing	Buick	497	0	running	142	$8,850
9	9	75	Neil Bonnett	RahMoc Enterprises	Pontiac	496	0	running	138	$6,630
10	18	30	Michael Waltrip	Bahari Racing	Chevrolet	495	0	running	134	$7,285
11	16	81	Buddy Arrington	Fillip Racing	Ford	494	0	running	130	$2,370
12	6	21	Kyle Petty	Wood Brothers Racing	Ford	493	0	running	127	$6,020
13	29	19	Derrike Cope (R)	Stoke Racing	Chevrolet	490	0	running	124	$2,720
14	26	52	Jimmy Means	Jimmy Means Racing	Pontiac	488	0	running	121	$5,450
15	22	8	Bobby Hillin Jr.	Stavola Brothers Racing	Buick	452	0	rear end	118	$7,820
16	15	15	Ricky Rudd	Bud Moore Engineering	Ford	440	0	rear end	115	$9,050
17	1	26	Morgan Shepherd	King Racing	Buick	396	34	engine	117	$9,550
18	30	48	Tony Spanos	Hylton Motorsports	Chevrolet	386	0	running	0	$1,555
19	21	44	Sterling Marlin	Hagan Racing	Oldsmobile	378	0	running	106	$4,385
20	23	64	Jerry Cranmer	Langley Racing	Ford	369	0	clutch	103	$4,850
21	11	17	Darrell Waltrip	Hendrick Motorsports	Chevrolet	360	45	engine	105	$2,200
22	10	43	Richard Petty	Petty Enterprises	Pontiac	347	0	timing chain	97	$4,375
23	12	71	Dave Marcis	Marcis Auto Racing	Chevrolet	333	0	rear end	94	$4,100
24	25	67	Eddie Bierschwale	Arrington Racing	Ford	269	0	engine	91	$3,485
25	24	62	Steve Christman (R)	Winkle Motorsports	Pontiac	264	0	running	88	$1,375
26	17	35	Benny Parsons	Hendrick Motorsports	Chevrolet	223	0	valve	85	$9,350
27	3	33	Harry Gant	Mach 1 Racing	Chevrolet	186	20	rear end	87	$5,405
28	8	7	Alan Kulwicki	AK Racing	Ford	185	0	oil line	79	$4,970
29	14	18	Dale Jarrett (R)	Freedlander Motorsports	Chevrolet	113	0	engine	0	$4,135
30	28	12	Slick Johnson	Hamby Racing	Oldsmobile	87	0	timing chain	73	$2,660
31	27	70	J. D. McDuffie	McDuffie Racing	Pontiac	21	0	engine	70	$1,160
Official race results

== Standings after the race ==
Drivers' Championship standings

	Pos	Driver	Points
	1	Dale Earnhardt	1,390
	2	Bill Elliott	1,233 (-157)
1	3	Neil Bonnett	1,138 (-252)
1	4	Richard Petty	1,105 (–285)
	5	Ricky Rudd	1,085 (–305)
	6	Terry Labonte	1,078 (–312)
2	7	Rusty Wallace	1,061 (–329)
	8	Kyle Petty	1,029 (–361)
1	9	Ken Schrader	1,028 (–362)
3	10	Darrell Waltrip	1,022 (–368)
Official driver's standings

- Note: Only the first 10 positions are included for the driver standings.

Previous race: 1987 Valleydale Meats 500	NASCAR Winston Cup Series; 1987 season	Next race: 1987 Winston 500
