= Albert Baker (cricketer) =

British cricketer (1872–1948)

Albert Baker (28 November 1872 – 17 April 1948) was an English first-class cricketer who played for Surrey between 1900 and 1912, scoring 1,257 runs in 1905. He was born and died in Farnham.
