= Jasper Motorsports =

American auto racing organization

- Owners: D. K. Ulrich; Doug Bawel; Mark Wallace; Mark Harrah; Bobby Hillin Jr.; Roger Penske
- Base: Statesville, North Carolina
- Series: Winston Cup
- Manufacturer: Ford; Dodge; Chevrolet
- Opened: 1971
- Closed: 2006

Career
- Debut: 1971 Maryville 200 (Maryville)
- Latest race: 2005 Ford 400 (Homestead)
- Races competed: 876
- Drivers' Championships: 0
- Race victories: 0
- Pole positions: 2

Jasper Motorsports was a NASCAR Cup Series team. It was owned by a variety of owners including D.K. Ulrich and Doug Bawel.

== 1970s–1980s ==
The car started in 1971 at what turned out to be the only Winston Cup race at Smoky Mountain Raceway as the No. 41 Ford owned and driven by Ulrich, who finished 29th out of 30 cars for heating problems on the 4th lap. Ulrich ran full-time for a couple of years, but normally he stepped aside and let other drivers race for him. During his tenure as an owner, he employed many younger drivers. Sterling Marlin, Tim Richmond, Morgan Shepherd, and Mark Martin all went on to successful careers after piloting Ulrich's car.

In 1987, Ulrich noticed a young short track driver from California named Ernie Irvan, who qualified 20th in a Dale Earnhardt-sponsored car for a race that Ulrich didn't make. Ulrich put the aggressive young Irvan in his car for three races that year, with Irvan's partner Marc Reno as crew chief. When Ulrich was able to get Kroger as a full-time sponsor for the team, he fielded the car full-time in 1988 with Irvan competing for NASCAR Winston Cup Series Rookie of the Year in the No. 2 Chevrolet/Pontiac, finishing 59 points behind Ken Bouchard for Rookie of the Year. In 1989, Irvan posted 4-top ten finishes and ending the season 22nd in points, three better than the previous year. Unfortunately, Kroger decided not to renew its contract, and Irvan had no choice but to leave the team. Ulrich was able to get several different sponsorships together for 1990, and the team ran most of the races.

== 1990s ==
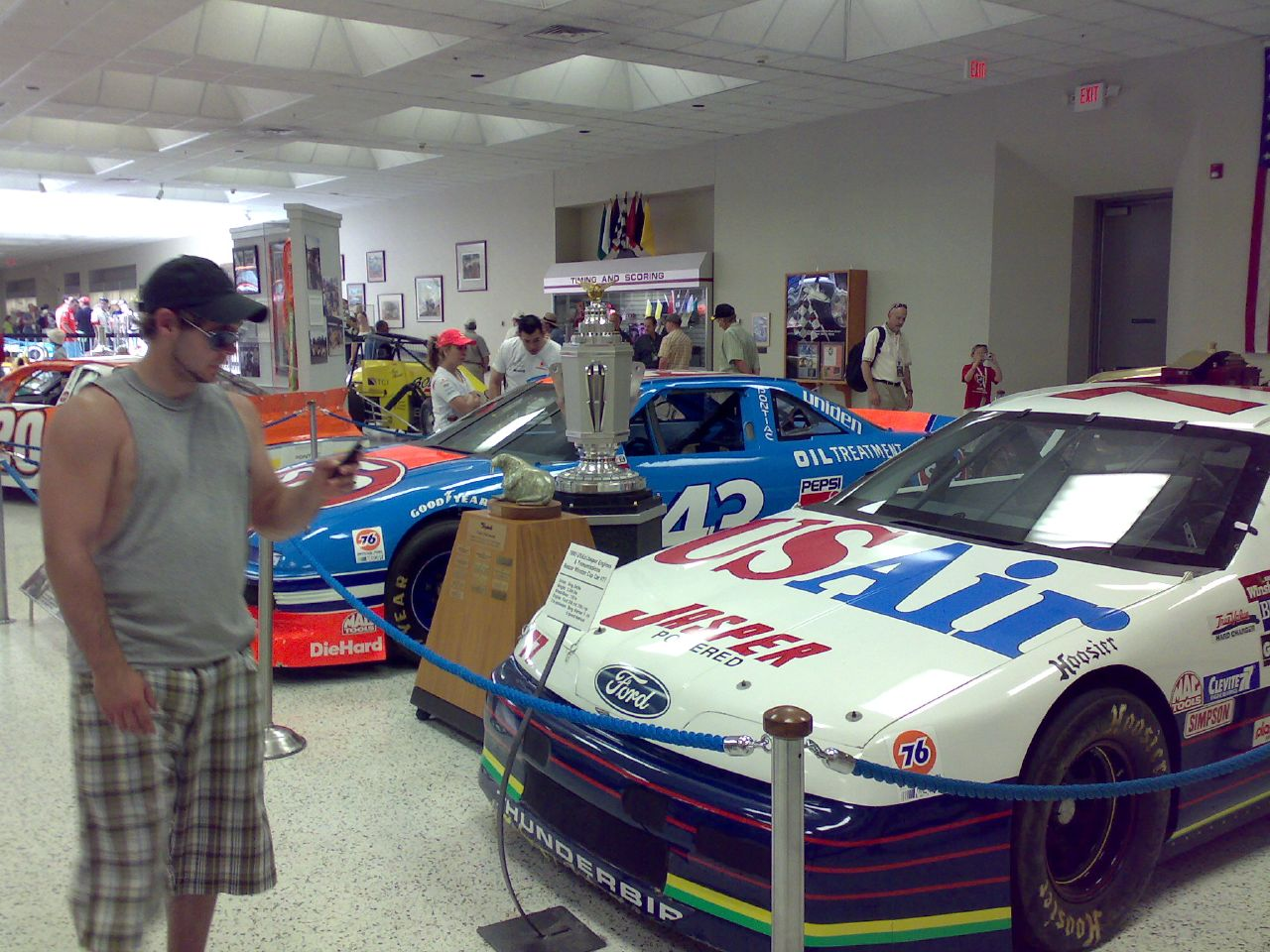
A Jasper Motorsports Ford Thunderbird on display at the Indianapolis Motor Speedway Museum.

The car returned full-time for 1991 as the No. 55 Pontiac sponsored by Jasper Engines, based in Jasper, Indiana. The team's original plan was a Winston Cup rookie campaign for popular USAC veteran and Indianapolis 500 starter Rich Vogler, but he perished while leading a USAC event at the Salem Speedway in Indiana in July 1990. Their next choice was Wisconsin's Ted Musgrave, who narrowly missed Rookie of the Year honors to Bobby Hamilton. During the 1992 and 1993 NASCAR seasons, Ulrich formed a partnership with Ray DeWitt to form RaDiUs Motorsports which continued with Musgrave behind the wheel. During the 1992 season, the team ran various makes from General Motors before switching to Ford halfway through the year. In 1994 Musgrave left for Roush Racing and Ulrich and DeWitt ended their partnership. DeWitt formed a new team with the RaDiUS name and No. 55 while Ulrich retained the Jasper sponsorship on the newly renumbered No. 77, with Doug Bawel, an executive from Jasper Engines & Transmissions, became a business partner with Ulrich, the team being renamed Jasper Motorsports with veteran journeyman Greg Sacks handling the driving chores as well as a major co-sponsorship from USAir. Jasper Engines & Transmissions co-sponsored the team for the 1995 season, with the car originally piloted by rookie Davy Jones and later Bobby Hillin Jr. After the season, Bawel bought the entire team from Ulrich and started a partnership with Jasper salesmen Mark Wallace and Mark Harrah. Hillin continued to drive the car for 1996, and the first part of 1997, before being replaced by Robert Pressley and Morgan Shepherd.

Pressley was full-time for 1998, during which he had a then-career-best finish of 3rd at Texas. 1999 was a tumultuous year for the team, struggling with qualifying and finishing 39th in points. For the 2000 season, the team began using Penske engines and hired Ryan Pemberton as crew chief. Change made a huge difference as Pressley finished 25th in points the next two years, finishing 2nd at the 2001 Tropicana 400 at Chicagoland Speedway.

== 2000s ==
Pressley, although picking up a few top-tens during his tenure with Jasper, struggled with consistency, even with his successful pairing with Pemberton. Therefore, Pressley and Jasper parted ways after the season, and former sprint car champion Dave Blaney was tabbed to replace him. But Blaney, while competitive in some races also struggled with consistency and was gone at the end of 2003.

Boris Said drove a No. 67 car on road courses and as a teammate to Blaney in 2002, finishing a best of 8th at Watkins Glen. The car is featured in the widely popular video game NASCAR Racing 2003 Season.

At the end of the year, Wallace sold his share of the team, and Roger Penske, who was already providing engines and support to the Jasper team, took his place. The team got a new sponsor in Kodak, as well as a new driver in rookie Brendan Gaughan and a new manufacturer in Dodge (the team had run Dodge instead of the usual Ford for the 2003 EA Sports 500, causing Ford to pull their factory support). Despite grabbing 4 top-10 finishes, Gaughan was replaced to the shock of fans by another rookie, Travis Kvapil. In his first year in the Cup circuit, he finished 32nd in points with two top-10 finishes. When the season came to a close, it was announced the No. 77 car would not run the 2006 season, as Penske would go back to fielding two cars in his own team.

Not long after the announcement, the team announced for 2006 an ownership partnership with Michael Waltrip and change to car No. 55 for Michael Waltrip to create Waltrip-Jasper Racing with Bill Davis Racing supplying the team's cars and at the track personnel. After 2006, Waltrip bought the 55 team outright and Michael Waltrip Racing became a full-time Cup team, thus ending Jasper Racing's team presence in NASCAR.

== Driver history ==
Notable drivers (Winston Cup Champions, Rookies of the Year, and Cup race winners) are highlighted in bold.

- (United States) D. K. Ulrich (1971–1975, 1978–1987, 1990)
- (United States) Roy Mayne (1971)
- (United States) Dick May (1971, 1980–1982)
- (United States) Frank Warren (1973)
- (United States) Harry Schilling (1974)
- (United States) Ed Negre (1974)
- (United States) Tony Bettenhausen Jr. (1974)
- (United States) Randy Bethea (1975)
- (United States) Al Elmore (1979, 1983)
- (United States) Bill Whittington (1980)
- (United States) Joe Booher (1980–1982, 1986)
- (United States) **Ricky Rudd** (1980)
- (United States) Dick Skillen (1980)
- (United States) Mike Alexander (1980)
- (United States) J. D. McDuffie (1980)
- (United States) Tommy Gale (1980, 1981, 1983)
- (United States) **Lennie Pond** (1980)
- (United States) **Sterling Marlin** (1980, 1981)
- (United States) **Tim Richmond** (1980–1981)
- (United States) Harry Dinwiddie (1980)
- (United States) Stan Barrett (1980, 1982)
- (United States) Chuck Bown (1981)
- (United States) Rick Baldwin (1981)
- (United States) Kevin Housby (1981)
- (United States) Al Loquasto (1981, 1982)
- (United States) Terry Herman (1981, 1982)
- (United States) Rick Knoop (1981, 1986, 1987)
- (United States) Cecil Gordon (1981)
- (United States) Elliott Forbes-Robinson (1981)
- (United States) Slick Johnson (1981–1982)
- (United States) Bob McElee (1981)
- (United States) Ronnie Thomas (1981)
- (United States) Don Hume (1981)
- (United States) Tommy Houston (1982)
- (United States) **Jimmy Hensley** (1982)
- (United States) Ferrel Harris (1982)
- (United States) Randy Becker (1982)
- (United States) Bob Jarvis (1982)
- (United States) Jim Sauter (1983, 1984, 1990)
- (United States) **Mark Martin** (1983)
- (United States) Connie Saylor (1983, 1984, 1987)
- (United States) **Morgan Shepherd** (1984, 1997)
- (United States) Jimmy Ingalls (1984)
- (United States) Clark Dwyer (1984)
- (United States) Doug Heveron (1984)
- (United States) Eddie Bierschwale (1985, 1990)
- (Canada) Trevor Boys (1986–1987)
- (United States) **Richard Petty** (one race in 1986)
- (United States) Bobby Baker (1987)
- (United States) Ron Esau (1987)
- (United States) **Ernie Irvan** (1987–1989)
- (United States) Rick Mast (1990)
- (United States) Jim Bown (1990)
- (United States) Troy Beebe (1990)
- (United States) **Charlie Glotzbach** (1990)
- (United States) Rick Ware (1990)
- (United States) Jerry O'Neil (1990)
- (United States) Ted Musgrave (1990–1993, 1998)
- (United States) **Greg Sacks** (1994)
- (United States) P. J. Jones (1994)
- (United States) Davy Jones (1995)
- (United States) **Bobby Hillin Jr.** (1995–1997)
- (United States) Robert Pressley (1997–2001)
- (United States) Hut Stricklin (1998)
- (United States) Boris Said (2001–2002; road races only)
- (United States) Dave Blaney (2002–2003)
- (United States) Brendan Gaughan (2004)
- (United States) Travis Kvapil (2005)

== Complete NASCAR Cup Series results ==
(Key)

=== Car No. 77 results ===
Year	Driver	No.	Make	1	2	3	4	5	6	7	8	9	10	11	12	13	14	15	16	17	18	19	20	21	22	23	24	25	26	27	28	29	30	31	32	33	34	35	36	Owners	Pts
1988	Ernie Irvan	2	Chevy	DAY; DNQ	RCH; DNQ	CAR; 25	ATL; 18	DAR; 22	BRI; 26		MAR; DNQ	TAL; 32	CLT; 22	DOV; 26	RSD; 31	POC; 37	MCH; 15	DAY; 25	POC; 22	TAL; 32				DAR; 20		DOV; 13		CLT; DNQ												29th	2319
1988	Ernie Irvan	2	Pontiac							NWS; 24											GLN; 29	MCH; 33	BRI; 15		RCH; 28		MAR; 11		NWS; 26	CAR; 15	PHO; 22	ATL; 18								29th	2319
1989	Ernie Irvan	2	Pontiac	DAY; 41	CAR; 23	ATL; 12	RCH; 9	DAR; 24	BRI; 29	NWS; 10	MAR; 19	TAL; 25	CLT; 15	DOV; 17	SON; 23	POC; 26	MCH; 18	DAY; 23	POC; 26	TAL; 20	GLN; 24	MCH; 25	BRI; 15	DAR; 24	RCH; 26	DOV; 33	MAR; 6	CLT; 33	NWS; 8	CAR; 16	PHO; 33	ATL; 11								23rd	2919
1990	Eddie Bierschwale	2	Olds	DAY; 32																																				36th	1906
1990	Rick Mast	2	Pontiac		RCH; 21	CAR; 19	ATL; 35	DAR; 39	BRI; 12		MAR; 29	TAL; 17	CLT; 31	DOV; 28																										36th	1906
1990	Rick Mast	2	Chevy							NWS; 23																														36th	1906
1990	Jim Bown	2	Pontiac												SON; 22																									36th	1906
1990	Troy Beebe	2	Pontiac													POC; 37	MCH; 31		POC; DNQ	TAL																				36th	1906
1990	Charlie Glotzbach	2	Pontiac															DAY; 35						DAR; 27																36th	1906
1990	Jerry O'Neil	2	Pontiac																		GLN; 26	MCH	BRI																	36th	1906
1990	D.K. Ulrich	2	Pontiac																						RCH; 33															36th	1906
1990	Jim Sauter	2	Pontiac																							DOV; 34														36th	1906
1990	Ron Esau	2	Pontiac																								MAR; DNQ	NWS; DNQ	CLT	CAR										36th	1906
1990	Ted Musgrave	2	Chevy																												PHO; 22									36th	1906
1990	Ted Musgrave	2	Pontiac																													ATL; 26								36th	1906
1991	Ted Musgrave	55	Pontiac	DAY; 30	RCH; 19	CAR; 25	ATL; 37	DAR; 21	BRI; 12	NWS; 17	MAR; 24	TAL; 16	CLT; 17	DOV; 18	SON; 37	POC; 27	MCH; 21	DAY; 37	POC; 13	TAL; 26	GLN; 26	MCH; 17	BRI; 16	DAR; 20	RCH; 22	DOV; 14	MAR; 20	NWS; 22	CLT; 14	CAR; 21	PHO; 18	ATL; 30								23rd	2841
1992	Ted Musgrave	55	Chevy	DAY; 8			ATL; 19					TAL; 21						DAY; 16		TAL; 12																				18th	3315
1992	Ted Musgrave	55	Olds		CAR; 17	RCH; 25			BRI; 14	NWS; 19	MAR; 20				SON; 22																									18th	3315
1992	Ted Musgrave	55	Pontiac					DAR; 15																																18th	3315
1992	Ted Musgrave	55	Ford										CLT; 8	DOV; 16		POC; 33	MCH; 8		POC; 5		GLN; 11	MCH; 25	BRI; 22	DAR; 30	RCH; 10	DOV; 8	MAR; 12	NWS; 14	CLT; 11	CAR; 29	PHO; 24	ATL; 9								18th	3315
1993	Ted Musgrave	55	Ford	DAY; 15	CAR; 7	RCH; 17	ATL; 19	DAR; 30	BRI; 15	NWS; 24	MAR; 28	TAL; 28	SON; 39	CLT; 26	DOV; 14	POC; 5	MCH; 15	DAY; 10	NHA; 24	POC; 33	TAL; 33	GLN; 34	MCH; 5	BRI; DNQ	DAR; 34	RCH; 22	DOV; 28	MAR; 31	NWS; 29	CLT; 21	CAR; 28	PHO; 15	ATL; 8							26th	2853
1994	Greg Sacks	77	Ford	DAY; 6	CAR; 28	RCH; 28	ATL; 7	DAR; 30	BRI; 11	NWS; 34	MAR; 29	TAL; 6	SON; 24	CLT; 27	DOV; 24	POC; 24	MCH; 33	DAY; 37	NHA; 25	POC; 36	TAL; 29	IND; 18	GLN; 39	MCH; 32	BRI; 27	DAR; 19	RCH; 27	DOV; 38	MAR; 26	NWS; 35	CLT; 35	CAR; 39	PHO; 26	ATL; 39						31st	2593
1995	Davy Jones	77	Ford	DAY; 33	CAR; 37	RCH; DNQ	ATL; 24	DAR; 20	BRI; 24	NWS; DNQ	MAR; DNQ	TAL; 33	SON; 36	CLT; DNQ																										36th	2120
1995	Bobby Hillin Jr.	77	Ford												DOV; 42	POC; 23	MCH; 13	DAY; 28	NHA; 20	POC; 12	TAL; 16	IND; 39	GLN; 27	MCH; 39	BRI; DNQ	DAR; 13	RCH; 36	DOV; 13	MAR; DNQ	NWS; 24	CLT; 24	CAR; 21	PHO; 21	ATL; 9						36th	2120
1996	Bobby Hillin Jr.	77	Ford	DAY; DNQ	CAR; 18	RCH; 26	ATL; 28	DAR; 41	BRI; DNQ	NWS; DNQ	MAR; DNQ	TAL; DNQ	SON; 43	CLT; 26	DOV; 29	POC; 13	MCH; 14	DAY; 32	NHA; 21	POC; 38	TAL; 35	IND; 26	GLN; 29	MCH; 19	BRI; DNQ	DAR; 18	RCH; 32	DOV; 12	MAR; 24	NWS; 35	CLT; 36	CAR; 33	PHO; 39	ATL; 16						37th	2238
1997	Bobby Hillin Jr.	77	Ford	DAY; 38	CAR; 42	RCH; 41	ATL; DNQ	DAR; 42	TEX; 42	BRI; DNQ	MAR; 33	SON; 35	TAL; 20	CLT; DNQ	DOV; 43	POC; 37																								38th	2033
1997	Morgan Shepherd	77	Ford														MCH; DNQ	CAL; 24	DAY; 32	NHA; 37	POC; 27	IND; DNQ	GLN; DNQ	MCH; 40	BRI; DNQ	DAR; DNQ	RCH; DNQ													38th	2033
1997	Robert Pressley	77	Ford																									NHA; 43	DOV; 39	MAR; 38	CLT; 36	TAL; 27	CAR; 13	PHO; 38	ATL; DNQ					38th	2033
1998	Robert Pressley	77	Ford	DAY; 32	CAR; 40	LVS; 23	ATL; 27	DAR; 20	BRI; 28	TEX; 3	MAR; 23	TAL; 31	CAL; 17	CLT; 16	DOV; 39	RCH; 41	MCH; 32	POC; 16	SON; 30	NHA; 34	POC; 32	IND; 29	GLN; 29	MCH; 24	BRI; 40	NHA; 12	DAR; 30	RCH; 43			CLT; 41	TAL; 26	DAY; DNQ	PHO; 17	CAR; 38	ATL; 28				33rd	2579
1998	Hut Stricklin	77	Ford																										DOV; 30											33rd	2579
1998	Ted Musgrave	77	Ford																											MAR; 15										33rd	2579
1999	Robert Pressley	77	Ford	DAY; 19	CAR; 14	LVS; DNQ	ATL; DNQ	DAR; 15	TEX; 20	BRI; 40	MAR; 23	TAL; 22	CAL; 39	RCH; 27	CLT; 35	DOV; 40	MCH; 42	POC; 35	SON; 40	DAY; DNQ	NHA; DNQ	POC; 23	IND; 17	GLN; DNQ	MCH; 42	BRI; 43	DAR; 25	RCH; 39	NHA; 30	DOV; 23	MAR; 35	CLT; 24	TAL; DNQ	CAR; 29	PHO; 38	HOM; 37	ATL; 27			39th	2050
2000	Robert Pressley	77	Ford	DAY; 20	CAR; 43	LVS; 21	ATL; 33	DAR; 18	BRI; 17	TEX; 26	MAR; 15	TAL; 23	CAL; 21	RCH; 35	CLT; 26	DOV; 26	MCH; 5	POC; 11	SON; 37	DAY; 17	NHA; 38	POC; 14	IND; 27	GLN; 26	MCH; 32	BRI; 37	DAR; 36	RCH; 37	NHA; 18	DOV; 14	MAR; 33	CLT; 35	TAL; 25	CAR; 12	PHO; 31	HOM; 16	ATL; 13			26th	3055
2001	Robert Pressley	77	Ford	DAY; 14	CAR; 12	LVS; 16	ATL; 36	DAR; 15	BRI; 28	TEX; 43	MAR; 40	TAL; 24	CAL; 10	RCH; 32	CLT; 38	DOV; 22	MCH; 21	POC; 14		DAY; 23	CHI; 2	NHA; 19	POC; 9	IND; 35		MCH; 14	BRI; 28	DAR; 38	RCH; 15	DOV; 37	KAN; 7	CLT; 25	MAR; 43	TAL; 27	PHO; 42	CAR; 13	HOM; 40	ATL; 21	NHA; 7	21st	3428
2001	Boris Said	77	Ford																SON; 11						GLN; 8															21st	3428
2002	Dave Blaney	77	Ford	DAY; 25	CAR; 22	LVS; 18	ATL; 17	DAR; 30	BRI; 17	TEX; 15	MAR; 17	TAL; 31	CAL; 9	RCH; 29	CLT; 21	DOV; 29	POC; 10	MCH; 13	SON; 20	DAY; 28	CHI; 17	NHA; 35	POC; 22	IND; 15	GLN; 18	MCH; 18	BRI; 33	DAR; 29	RCH; 9	NHA; 25	DOV; 11	KAN; 21	TAL; 31	CLT; 10	MAR; 20	ATL; 19	CAR; 17	PHO; 7	HOM; 43	19th	3670
2003	Dave Blaney	77	Ford	DAY; 24	CAR; 10	LVS; 34	ATL; 8	DAR; 3	BRI; 38	TEX; 36	TAL; 23	MAR; 31	CAL; 13	RCH; 18	CLT; 14	DOV; 20	POC; 26	MCH; 38	SON; 32	DAY; 35	CHI; 31	NHA; 13	POC; 9	IND; 28	GLN; 25	MCH; 25	BRI; 30	DAR; 30	RCH; 33	NHA; 14	DOV; 24		KAN; 43	CLT; 24	MAR; 37	ATL; 37	PHO; 24	CAR; 27	HOM; 28	29th	3194
2003	Dave Blaney	77	Dodge																													TAL; 17								29th	3194
2004	Brendan Gaughan	77	Dodge	DAY; 19	CAR; 20	LVS; 22	ATL; 33	DAR; 27	BRI; 20	TEX; 38	MAR; 17	TAL; 13	CAL; 6	RCH; 34	CLT; 33	DOV; 27	POC; 39	MCH; 16	SON; 26	DAY; 36	CHI; 30	NHA; 22	POC; 28	IND; 35	GLN; 34	MCH; 33	BRI; 35	CAL; 42	RCH; 27	NHA; 30	DOV; 22	TAL; 4	KAN; 10	CLT; 23	MAR; 34	ATL; 18	PHO; 30	DAR; 27	HOM; 6	28th	3165
2005	Travis Kvapil	77	Dodge	DAY; 19	CAL; 24	LVS; 26	ATL; 42	BRI; 7	MAR; 27	TEX; 30	PHO; 40	TAL; 18	DAR; 35	RCH; 22	CLT; 32	DOV; 17	POC; 17	MCH; 26	SON; 21	DAY; 23	CHI; 43	NHA; 27	POC; 38	IND; 37	GLN; 40	MCH; 38	BRI; 19	CAL; 33	RCH; 11	NHA; 41	DOV; 21	TAL; 16	KAN; 22	CLT; 17	MAR; 21	ATL; 26	TEX; 24	PHO; 10	HOM; 32	33rd	3077
