= Bob Baker (director) =

Canadian theatre director

- Born: May 11, 1952 (age 72); Edmonton, Alberta, Canada
- Other names: Robert Kenneth Baker
- Occupation: Theatre Director (Retired)
- Years active: 1974–2018
- Known for: Artistic Director Citadel Theatre
- Partner(s): Tom Wood (Actor, Playwright)

Robert Kenneth Baker (born May 11, 1952) is a retired Canadian theatre director most known for his work as the artistic director of the Citadel Theatre in Edmonton, Alberta, from 1998 to 2016.

== Early life and education ==
Born and raised in Edmonton, Alberta, Baker completed his bachelor of fine arts degree in theatre at University of Alberta in 1974.

== Career ==
In 1972, during his undergraduate studies Baker co-founded Alberta Barter Theatre in 1972. He worked at the Stratford Festival in Stratford, Ontario, from 1974 to 1979. Baker returned to Edmonton in 1982 as the artistic director of Phoenix Theatre. While there, he guided the company towards contemporary works featuring social commentary and a strong visual element, both of which still characterize his work.

=== Canadian Stage Company ===
In 1990, Baker became the artistic director of Canadian Stage. While there Baker directed Into the Woods by Stephen Sondheim. In 1997, he directed the entire seven-hour Tony Kushner epic Angels in America.

=== Citadel Theatre ===
In 1998, Baker moved back to Edmonton to become the 12th artistic director of the Citadel Theatre. He would serve as the artistic director from 1999 until 2016, becoming the longest serving AD of the company. One of Baker's most lasting impacts was the direction of a new adaptation of the Charles Dickens holiday classic A Christmas Carol' written by Baker's partner Tom Wood. This production was one of the Citadel Theatre's most ambitious. Playwright Tom Wood would also play the role of Ebenezer Scrooge. The production involved a large cast that included over a dozen youth performers. Baker and Wood's adaptation would become an Edmonton holiday tradition, lasting 19 years. During his tenure at the Citadel Theatre, the company developed several unique programs supporting artists, these included the Foote Theatre School and the Robbins Academy. Baker also oversaw the development of an advanced training program for theatre professionals at the Banff Centre for Arts and Creativity.

Bakers time at the Citadel ended in 2016 when he stepped away from his role as artistic director. He was succeeded by Daryl Cloran. Baker would remain with the Citadel in the role of artistic director emeritas until 2018. In June 2019, Baker was expelled from the Canadian Actors' Equity Association, in response to complaints from actors in Edmonton.

== Awards and honors ==
=== Honors ===
Bob Baker is a member of Edmonton's Cultural Hall of Fame, a recipient of the Queen Elizabeth II Diamond Jubilee Medal for exceptional service, excellence and community involvement; the University of Alberta's Distinguished Alumni Award; and a PACE award from Alberta Association of Colleges and Technical Institutes.

=== Awards ===
- Dora Mavor Moore Awards - 4 nominations & 1 win
- Elizabeth Sterling Haynes Awards - 8 nominations & 5 wins

== Personal life ==
Baker's partner of over 40 years is playwright Tom Wood. They have collaborated on many productions, including Wood's adaptation of A Christmas Carol and original plays Make Mine Love and B Movie.
