= Bobby Baker (artist) =

Food sculptor and social practitioner

- Born: 1950 (age 75–76); Kent
- Occupation: Artist
- Baker's voice recorded 2012, as part of an audio description of Paradise Park for VocalEyes

Bobby Baker (born 1950, Kent) is a multi-disciplinary artist and activist working across performance, drawing and multi-media. Baker is the artistic director of the arts organisation Daily Life Ltd. A hallmark of Baker's work is food being used as an artistic medium. As John Daniel writes, 'Food - shopping for it, cooking it, serving it, consuming it - is a consistent feature in Baker's work, which focuses on the seemingly mundane, everyday details of life' (2007:246) Drawing from her own personal and family experiences, her work explores the relationship between art and lived experience and addresses the splitting of women's domestic and professional lives. Claire MacDonald points out how her artistic trajectory - moving from early food sculptures to later performances and installations - reflects the changing agenda of women's movement.

== Information ==
Baker lives in London, England. She studied painting at St. Martins School of Art (now Central Saint Martins) between 1968 and 1972. In 1973 she attended Goldsmiths, University of London to take the Art Teachers Certificate. She was awarded an honorary Doctorate by Queen Mary University London in 2011. In a career spanning over four decades she has, among other things, danced with meringue ladies; made a life-sized edible version of her family; and driven around the streets of Haarlem, Holland strapped to the back of a truck yelling at passers by through a megaphone to Pull Yourselves Together.

Daily Life Ltd is an arts organisation that produces the work of Baker and others. Together they create powerful art that investigates and questions the way people think about feminism, daily life and mental health. These artworks cross many disciplines and provide unique, high quality artistic experiences for a wide range of audiences both nationally and internationally. They seek to challenge the stigmatisation and discrimination of people with experience of mental distress and raise public awareness of this vital sector. In March 2011 Daily Life Ltd became part of Arts Council England's National Portfolio.

== Key works ==
- An Edible Family in a Mobile Home (1976)

is a performance where Baker sculpted life size models of her own family out of cake, inviting 'guests' participating in the performance to eat, as she served them tea.

- Drawing on a Mother's Experience (1988)

is a performance to camera that depicts Baker creating a live drawing out of pressed beef, Guinness, milk, fish pie and treacle on a double white sheet. She makes a work 'parodying Jackson Pollock's vigorous masculine action painting of the 1950s, substituting the materials of a mother's experience for paint'. After covering the sheet in the materials, she clears up, packing her bags and damping away the food, before dredging the work in white flour, lying down and wrapping herself in the sheet, and dancing with difficulty to Nina Simone's 'My Baby Just Cares For Me', before walking off as the music fades.

- Daily Life (1991-2001)

A quintet of site-specific shows that were performed in her own kitchen, her children's school and the local church. The quintet consists of Kitchen Show, How to Shop, Take a Peek!, Grown-up School, and Box Story. These were a collaboration with co-director Polona Baloh Brown

- How to Live (2004)

Drawing from her own experience being treated with Dialectical Behavioural Therapy (DBT) - a form of cognitive behavioural therapy - Baker performs a self-styled mental-health guru imparting an 11-steps programme for a happy life. Staged as public seminar, Baker demonstrates the programme by treating one of her patients - a frozen pea. The piece emerged from a collaboration with psychologist and social anthropologist Dr. Richard Hallam (funded by the Wellcome Trust).

- Drawing on a (Grand) Mother's Experience (2015)

is a re-staging of the work Drawing on a Mother's Experience as a part of the Women of the World festival at the Southbank Centre, London in March 2015. The work expands on her experience as a working mother and grandmother and the challenges she faced while navigating the mental health system. She follows the original structure of Drawing on a Mother's Experience, while now aided by a performance assistant. Once she arrives at the original ending, standing wrapped in the canvas, she unwraps herself and sets the sheet back down in order to then add chocolate cakes, ketchup, sparkling water, oats, and peas. She then hoists the sheet over her head, creating a head-hole so that the canvas can be worn like a poncho. She finally shimmies out of the canvas, dancing away once again to 'My Baby Just Cares for Me'. She revived the work for the same festival on 8 March 2020.

== Activism ==
Baker's 2009 Wellcome Trust Diary Drawing exhibition about her experience of mental illness and recovery launched her onto a worldwide platform of mental health and arts campaigners, connecting her with a growing network of organisations and practitioners. Since then, she has aimed to use her position to help promote and foster opportunities for diverse marginalised artists. Her work focuses on undervalued and stigmatised aspects of everyday life and human behaviour, expressly undertaking to foreground the lives of women in the mainstream and bring status to so-called 'humble' daily activity.

Baker's work explores feminist themes, framing the women's movement and marking its changes of agenda, moving from early work in food sculpture to later performances and installations which map the equivalences and commonalities between composing art and composing a life. She took an eight-year-long break from art to have two children, and her subsequent art investigated the relationship of art and lived experience, particularly in works such as Cook Dems, Kitchen Show and How to Shop.

On 6 March 2020, as part of the Women of the World festival, Baker will lead a panel entitled Sticky Labels: Women and the Mental Health System, investigating why women have been branded everything from 'witches' to 'morally insane'. It is described as a discussion to explore the politics of women and mental health, and the misogyny within the contemporary psychiatric diagnostic framework. Other panelists will include Dr. Leyla Hussein, Dr. Akima Thomas, and Professor Mary Boyle.
