= Robert Baker (ice hockey) =

American ice hockey player (1926-2012)

- Born: December 21, 1926 Thief River Falls, Minnesota, U.S.
- Died: February 9, 2012 (aged 85) Raleigh, North Carolina, U.S.
- Position: Right wing
- Shot: Left
- National team: United States
- Playing career: 1944–1958

Robert Oscar Baker (December 21, 1926 – February 9, 2012) was an American ice hockey player who competed in ice hockey at the 1948 Winter Olympics.

== Career ==
Baker was a member of the American ice hockey team which played eight games but was disqualified, at the 1948 Winter Olympics in St. Moritz, Switzerland. After retiring from professional hockey, Baker worked for IBM for 30 years.

== Personal life ==
Baker and his wife, Evelyn, were married for 37 years. They had six children. Baker died in Raleigh, North Carolina, in 2012 at the age of 85.
