= Bob Baker (gridiron football) =

American gridiron football player and coach (born 1927)

Profile
- Positions: Quarterback, running back, kicker

Personal information
- Born: November 28, 1927 (age 98); Lima, Ohio, U.S.

Career information
- High school: Bluffton (Bluffton, Indiana)
- College: Ball State

Career history

Playing
- Ball State (1947–1950)

Coaching
- Royertown High School (1951) Assistant coach; Royertown High School (1952–1958) Head coach; Ft. Wayne South High School (1959) Assistant coach; Anderson High School (Madison Heights, Indiana) (1960–1965) Head coach; Indiana (1966–1972) Wide receivers coach; Illinois (1973) Assistant coach; Calgary Stampeders (1974–1975) Assistant head coach; Calgary Stampeders (1975–1976) Head coach; Michigan State (1977–1979) Offensive backfield coach; Arizona State (1980–1982) Offensive coordinator; Los Angeles Rams (1983–1984) Quarterbacks coach; Detroit Lions (1985–1988) Offensive coordinator; Winnipeg Blue Bombers (1989) Quarterbacks/receivers coach; Pace (1989–1991) Head coach

Awards and highlights
- Ball State University Coach of the Year (1977); Ball State University Hall of Fame (1977); Indiana Football Hall of Fame (1981)
- Coaching profile at Pro Football Reference

Robert Baker (born November 28, 1927) is an American former gridiron football coach. He served as the head coach for the Calgary Stampeders of the Canadian Football League (CFL) from 1975 to 1976 and as the head football coach at Pace University from 1989 to 1991. He was a coach for 40 seasons before retiring in 1991.

== Early life and education ==
Baker was born on November 28, 1927, in Lima, Ohio. He went to Bluffton High School in Indiana. Baker went to college at Ball State. While in college he played quarterback, running back, and kicker. He led them to an 8–0 record in 1949. He was named All-State in 1950. He would later be inducted into Ball State's Athletic Hall of Fame.

== Coaching career ==
=== Royertown High School ===
Shortly after graduating college, he went to Royertown High School to become a coach. In 1951 he was an assistant coach and was promoted to head coach the next year. He was the head coach for seven seasons.

=== Ft. Wayne South High School ===
In 1959 he was an assistant coach for Ft. Wayne South High School.

=== Madison Hts High School (Anderson, Indiana) ===
From 1960 to 1965, he was the head coach for Madison Hts High School (Anderson, Indiana).

=== Indiana ===
His first year of college coaching was in 1966 with the Indiana Hoosiers. He stayed with them for 7 seasons before going to Illinois. He was the wide receivers coach.

=== Illinois ===
For one season (1973) he was the assistant coach at Illinois.

=== Calgary Stampeders ===
His first year of professional coaching came in 1974 as the assistant coach for the Calgary Stampeders. He was named head coach at the end of 1975. After 1976 he went to Michigan State University.

=== Michigan State ===
For three seasons, he was an assistant coach for the Michigan State Spartans. He was there from 1977 to 1979.

=== Arizona State ===
For about a season in the 1980s, he was the offensive coordinator for the Arizona State Sun Devils.

=== Los Angeles Rams ===
His first year of National Football League (NFL) coaching was in 1983. He was the Los Angeles Rams quarterbacks coach. He was there for two seasons (1983 to 1984).

=== Detroit Lions ===
From 1985 to 1988, he was the offensive coordinator for the Detroit Lions.

=== Winnipeg Blue Bombers ===
The next season he spent with the Winnipeg Blue Bombers of the Canadian Football League (CFL). He was their quarterbacks and receivers coach.

=== Pace ===
From 1989 to 1991, he was the head coach of the Pace Setters.

== Head coaching record ==
=== College ===
Year	Team	Overall	Conference	Standing	Bowl/playoffs
Pace Setters (Liberty Football Conference) (1989–1991)
1989	Pace	1–9	1–4	T–5th	
1990	Pace	1–9	0–5	6th	
1991	Pace	2–8	1–4	6th	
Pace:		4–26	2–13		
Total:		4–26			

== Awards and honors ==
=== Playing honors ===
- All-State (1950)

=== Coaching honors ===
- Ball State Coach of the Year (1977)
- Ball State Athletic Hall of Fame (1977)
- Indiana Football Hall of Fame (1981)
