= Bobby Baker (racing driver) =

American racing driver

- Born: Lakeland, Florida

NASCAR Cup Series career
- 1 race run over 1 year
- Best finish: 82nd (1987)
- First race: 1987 First Union 400 (North Wilkesboro)
Wins	Top tens	Poles
0	0	0

Bobby Baker is a retired NASCAR driver who made one Winston Cup start in the 1987 First Union 400 at North Wilkesboro Speedway. He started 30th and finished 23rd, completing the race and earning $3,500 in prize money. Baker drove the No. 6 U.S. Racing Chevrolet fielded by D. K. Ulrich.

== Motorsports career results ==
=== NASCAR ===
(key) (Bold – Pole position awarded by qualifying time. Italics – Pole position earned by points standings or practice time. * – Most laps led.)

==== Winston Cup Series ====
NASCAR Winston Cup Series results
Year	Team	No.	Make	1	2	3	4	5	6	7	8	9	10	11	12	13	14	15	16	17	18	19	20	21	22	23	24	25	26	27	28	29	NWCC	Pts	Ref
1987	U.S. Racing	6	Chevy	DAY	CAR	RCH	ATL	DAR	NWS; 23	BRI	MAR	TAL	CLT	DOV	POC	RSD	MCH	DAY	POC	TAL	GLN	MCH	BRI	DAR	RCH	DOV	MAR	NWS	CLT	CAR	RSD	ATL	82nd	94	
