= Harold (given name) =

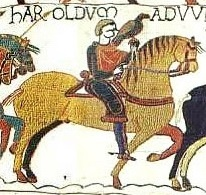
- Depiction of the Anglo-Saxon king Harold Godwinson on the Bayeux Tapestry
- Gender: Male

Origin
- Origin: Proto-Germanic, via Old English and Old Norse
- Meaning: Military-Power or Army-Ruler
- Region of origin: England

Other names
- Related names: Harald (German and Continental Scandinavian), Haraldur (Icelandic), Haroldo (Spanish, Portuguese), Aroldo (Italian)

Harold is an English personal name. The modern name Harold ultimately derives from the Proto-Germanic *harja-waldaz, meaning 'military-power' or 'army-ruler'. The name entered Modern English via the Old English from Hereweald, which retained the same meaning and was prevalent in Anglo-Saxon England. The name's popularity in Viking Age England would also have been bolstered by the use of the Old Norse form Haraldr among Scandinavian settlers in the Danelaw.

== Ancient ==
- Chariovalda (d. 16), Batavian chieftain and Roman ally, killed near the River Weser

== Medieval ==
- Hagrold (fl. 944–954), also known as Harold, Scandinavian chieftain in Normandy
- Harold Harefoot, or Harold I (c. 1015–1040), King of England from 1035 to 1040
- Harold Godwinson, or Harold II (c. 1022–1066), the last Anglo-Saxon king of England and Earl of Wessex
- Harold, son of Harold Godwinson (fl. 1067–1098)
- Mstislav-Harald I Monomakh Grand Prince of Kyiv (1076–1132), grandson of Harold Godwinson, son of his daughter Gytha of Wessex
- Harold of Gloucester (died 1168), supposed child martyr and saint, allegedly murdered by Jews
- Harald Fairhair (850-932), the first King of Norway
- Arioald, king of the Lombards

== Modern name ==
- Harold Abrahams, British Olympic champion sprinter and subject of Chariots of Fire
- Harold Achor (1907–1967), Justice of the Indiana Supreme Court
- Harold Alexander, 1st Earl Alexander of Tunis, British Army officer who served with distinction in both the First World War and the Second World War and, afterwards, as Governor General of Canada, the 17th since Canadian Confederation
- Harold Arroyo, Puerto Rican boxer
- Harold Bailey (gridiron football) (born 1957), American football player
- Harold Walter Bailey (1899–1996), British linguist
- Harold Baines (born 1959), American baseball player
- Harold Baker (photographer) (1860–1942), British photographer
- Harold Baker (politician) (1877–1960), British politician, Financial Secretary to the War Office 1912–1915
- Harold Armstrong "H. A." Baker (1881–1971), American author and Pentecostal missionary
- Harold Baker (cricketer) (1884–1954), English cricketer
- Harold "Shorty" Baker (1914–1966), American jazz musician
- Harold Baker (judge) (born 1929), federal judge on United States District Courts in Illinois
- Harold Bride (1890–1956), British wireless operator, second operator and survivor of RMS Titanic
- Harold Brooks-Baker (1933–2005), American-British financier, journalist, and publisher, and self-proclaimed expert on genealogy
- Harold Bekkering (born 1965), Dutch cognitive psychologist
- Harold Bloom, American literary critic
- Harold Bowman (1903–1957), GB & England international rugby league footballer
- Harold Budd (1936–2020), American composer and poet
- Harold Burrage, American singer
- Harold Cobert (born 1974), French writer
- Harold Cottam (1891–1984), British wireless operator, operator of RMS Carpathia during sinking of the Titanic
- Harold Craxton (1885–1971), British composer and pianist
- Harold Camping (1921–2013), President of Family Radio
- Harold "Hal" Daub (born 1941), American politician
- Harold Danko (born 1947), American jazz pianist
- Harold Demsetz (1930–2019), American economist
- Harold de Soysa (1907–1971), first indigenous Anglican Bishop of Colombo, Sri Lanka
- Harold Diamond (1926–1982), American art dealer
- Harold L. Dibble, American Paleolithic archaeologist
- Harold H. Dunwoody (1919–2015), United States Army brigadier general
- Harold Ely (1909–1983), American football player
- Harold Leroy Enarson (1919–2006), American academic and university president
- Harold Faltermeyer (born 1952), German musician
- Harold Fannin Jr. (born 2004), American football player
- Harold H. Fisher, (1901–2005), American church architect
- Harold Ford Jr., U.S. Congressman, candidate for U.S. Senate
- Harold Frost (1921–2004), American orthopedist and surgeon
- Harold Goldsmith (1930–2004), American fencer
- Harold "Red" Grange (1903–1991), American football player
- Harold Hart (born 1952), American football player
- Harold Helgeson (1931–2007), American geochemist
- Harold Herath (1930–2007), Sri Lanka Minister of Foreign Affairs from 1991–1993
- Harold "Hal" Holbrook (1925–2021), American actor
- Harold Holt, Australian Prime Minister
- Harold Holt (impresario), South African-English impresario
- Harold Houser, American admiral and 35th Governor of American Samoa
- Harold J. Gibbons, American trade unionist
- Harold Guy Hunt (1933–2009), American politician
- Harold "Hal" Jeffcoat (1924–2007), American baseball player
- Harold George Jeffcoat (born 1947), American academic
- Harold A. Jerry Jr. (1920–2001), New York politician
- Harold Keller (1921–1979), American Marine and Iwo Jima flag raiser
- Harold La Borde, Trinidadian circumnavigator
- Harold Landry (born 1996), American football player
- Harold "Hal" Lindsey (born 1929), American evangelist and Christian writer
- Harold Lloyd, American film actor
- Harold Lowe (1882–1944), British merchant sailor, fifth officer of RMS Titanic
- Harold Gene Lucas (1951–2026), American convicted child killer and one of the longest-serving inmates on death row in the United States
- Harold C. Luther (1915–1973), New York politician
- Harold MacMichael (1882–1969), British Colonial administrator
- Harold Macmillan, Prime Minister of Great Britain
- Harold "Hal" Malchow (1951–2024), political consultant
- Harold C. Marden (1900–1994), American lawyer and judge
- Harold McCartney, English rugby player
- Harold B. Minor (1902–1984), American diplomat
- Harold A. Moise (1879–1958), associate justice of the Louisiana Supreme Court
- Harold Needler (1910–1975), British businessman who was chairman of Hull City from 1945 until his death in 1975
- Harold James Nicholson, former Central Intelligence Agency (CIA) officer and a twice-convicted spy for Russia's Foreign Intelligence Service (SVR)
- Harold Nicolson, British diplomat, author, diarist, and politician
- Harold Norse, American poet
- Harold I. Panken (1910–1999), New York state senator
- Harold Peiris (1904–1988), Sri Lankan Sinhala lawyer, author, scholar, teacher, and philanthropist
- Harold Perkins (born 2004), American football player
- Harold Perrineau, American actor
- Harold Pinter (1930–2008), British playwright
- Harold Prince (1928–2019), American theatrical producer and director
- Harold Ramis (1944–2014), American film actor, director, writer and producer
- Harold Reynolds (disambiguation), multiple people
- Harold S. Roise (1916–1991), American Marine officer, double Navy Cross recipient
- Harold G. Schrier (1916–1971), American Marine officer and Iwo Jima flag raiser
- Harold Schultz (1925–1995), American Marine and Iwo Jima flag raiser
- Harold Shipman (1946–2004), British general practitioner and serial killer
- Harold Seymour (1910–1992), American baseball historian
- Harold Solomon (born 1952), American tennis player
- Harold St. John (1892–1991), American botanist
- Harold St. John Loyd Winterbotham (1879–1946), British surveyor and soldier
- Harold "Hal" Steinbrenner (born 1969), principal owner, managing general partner and co-chairman of the New York Yankees baseball franchise
- Harold Syrett (1913–1984), American executive editor of The Papers of Alexander Hamilton, and president of Brooklyn College
- Harold Terry, English novelist, playwright, actor and critic
- Harold Traynor (1922–1983), Australian rules footballer
- Harold Joseph "Pie" Traynor (1898–1972), American baseball player
- Harold Tucker, Lord Mayor of Manchester, England, from 1984–1985
- Harold I. Tyler (1901–1967), New York assemblyman
- Harold R. Tyler Jr. (1922–2005), federal judge in New York
- Harold Urey (1893–1981), American physical chemist
- Harold B. "Hal" Wallis (1898–1986), American film producer
- Harold Walker (disambiguation), several people
- Harold Washington, first African-American mayor of Chicago
- Harold Weed, digital artist
- Harold E. Weeks, American politician
- Harold Weisberg, American author
- Harold Wellman (1909–1999), New Zealand geologist
- Harold Wilson, British Prime Minister
- Harold Wren (1921–2016), American dean of three law schools
- Harold "Butch" Wynegar (born 1956), baseball player
- Harold Zent (1900–1951), member of the Washington House of Representatives

=== Fictional characters ===
- Healthy Harold, an Australian Giraffe sock puppet early educating Australian primary school children
- Harold Allnut, from the Batman comic series
- Harold Berman, from the Nickelodeon animated series Hey Arnold!
- Harold Bishop, from the Australian soap opera Neighbours
- Harold Foster, a multibillionaire Australian newspaper company chairman from Anthony Horowitz's Power of Five series
- Harold Green, Red Green's nephew on The Red Green Show
- Harold Hutchins, a main character in the Captain Underpants book series
- Harold "Hal" Jordan, a DC Comics superhero known as Green Lantern
- Harold Lauder, from Stephen King's The Stand
- Harold "Happy" Loman, from the American stage play Death of a Salesman
- Harold McBride, a supporting character from the animated series The Loud House
- Harold Saxon, an alias of The Master from the British science-fiction series Doctor Who
- Harold Smith, from the 1990s television drama Twin Peaks
- Harold and the Purple Crayon from the children's books by Crockett Johnson
- Hide the Pain Harold, a fictional identity in meme images based on photos of Hungarian engineer András Arató
- King Harold of Far Far Away, from the films Shrek 2 (2004) and Shrek the Third (2007)

== See also ==
- Darold
- Harald (disambiguation)
- Hal (given name)
- Harry (given name)
