= Hal (given name) =

Hal is a masculine given name, often a diminutive form (hypocorism) of Harold, Henry or Harvey, and a nickname. Notable people with the name include:

== People ==
- Hal Abelson (born 1947), American mathematician
- Hal Adelquist (1914–1981), American animator
- Hal Aloma (1908–1980), Hawaiian musician
- Hal Anderson (born 1964), Canadian radio host
- Hal Anderson (baseball) (1904–1974), American baseball player
- Hal Anger (1920–2005), American engineer and biophysicist
- Hal Ashby (1929–1988), American film director and editor
- Hal August (1890–1918), American silent film actor
- Hal W. Ayer (died 1913), American newspaper editor and politician
- Hal Baird, American baseball player and coach
- Hal Bamberger (1924-2010), American baseball player
- Hal C. Banks (1909–1985), American labor leader
- Hal Baron (1930–2017), American historian
- Hal V. Barron (born 1962), American biotechnologist
- Hal Barwood (born 1940), American writer, game developer, and filmmaker
- Hal Bauer (1927–1993), American politician
- Hal Baylor (1918–98), American boxer and actor
- Hal Becker (born 1954), American writer
- Hal de Becker (1931–2021), American dancer and writer
- Hal Beckett
- Hal Bedsole (1941–2017), American football player
- Hal Bennett (1936–2004), American novelist
- Hal Bernson (1930–2020), American politician
- Hal Bernton, American journalist
- Hal Bevan-Petman (1894–1980), British painter
- Hal Bevan (1930–1968), American baseball player
- Hal Blaine (1929–2019), American drummer
- Hal Block (1913-1981), American comedian
- Hal Blumenfeld (born 1962), American neuroscientist
- Hal Borland (1900–1978), American writer and journalist
- Hal Borne (1911–2000), American songwriter
- Hal Boyle (1911–1974), American newspaper journalist
- Hal Bradley (1913–1981), American football player
- Hal Braham (1911–1994), American novelist
- Hal Brands (born 1983), American historian
- Hal Breeden (1944–2021), American baseball player
- Hal Brill (1914–1980), American football player
- Hal Broda (1905–1985), American football player
- Hal Bromm (born 1947), American art dealer
- Hal Brown (1924–2015), American baseball player
- Hal Brown (athlete) (1898–1983), American long-distance runner
- Hal Browne, Australian rugby league footballer
- Hal E. Broxmeyer (died 2021), American microbiologist
- Hal Bruno (1928–2011), American journalist
- Hal Bubser (1895–1959), American baseball player
- Hal Buell (1931/1932 – 2024), American photographer
- Hal Bunderson (born 1936), American politician
- Hal Burrows (1924–2014), American tennis player
- Hal Burt (1900–1979), American football player
- Hal B. Burton, American politician in Arkansas
- Hal Bynum (1934–2022), American singer-songwriter
- Hal Clement (1922–2003), American author and artist
- Hal Clements, American actor
- Hal Colebatch, Australian politician
- Hal Colebatch (author) (1945–2019), Australian author
- Hal Cormier, Canadian politician
- Hal Cruttenden, English stand-up comedian, writer, and actor
- Hal Daub (born 1941), American politician
- Hal David (1921–2012), American lyricist
- Hal Davis (1933–1998), American songwriter
- Hal Dixon (biochemist) (1928–2008), Irish biochemist
- Hal Draper (1914–1990), American socialist activist and writer
- Hal Duncan (born 1971), Scottish writer
- Hal Geer (1916–2017), American film producer
- Hal Gibney (1911–1973), American broadcast announcer
- Hal Gill (born 1975), American ice hockey player
- Hal Goldsmith (1930–2004), American fencer
- Hal Gurnee (born 1925), American TV director
- Hal Halvorsen, military officer
- Hal Helgeson (1931–2007), American geochemist
- Hal Holbrook (1925–2021), American actor
- Hal Hunter (American football, born 1932) (1932–2014), American gridiron football coach
- Hal Hunter (American football, born 1959) (born 1959), American football coach
- Hal Hunter (fullback), American football player
- Hal Irelan (1890–1944), American baseball player
- Hal Jackman (born 1932), Canadian businessman
- Hal Jackson (1915–2012), Disc jockey and radio personality
- Hal Jacobson (born 1950), American politician
- Hal Janvrin (1892–1962), American baseball player
- Hal Jarrett (1907–1983), South African cricketer
- Hal Jeffcoat (1924–2007), American baseball player
- Hal B. Jennings (1915–2008), US Army surgeon general
- Hal Jeter (born 1945), American basketball player
- Hal Jones (baseball) (born 1936), American baseball player
- Hal Jones (ice hockey) (1933–2022), Canadian ice hockey player
- Hal Ketchum (1953–2020), American singer
- Hal Lear (1935–2016), American basketball player
- Hal Linden (born 1931), American actor
- Hal Lindsey (1929–2024), American evangelist
- Hal Mayforth, American cartoonist and artist
- Hal McRae (born 1945), American baseball player
- Hal Moe (1910–2001), American football player and coach
- Hal Moore (1922–2017), U.S. Army general
- Hal Moore (wrestler) (1923–2003), American
- Hal Needham (1931–2013), American stunt performer
- Hal Newhouser (1921–1998), American baseball pitcher
- Hal Porter (1911–1984), Australian novelist
- Hal Prewitt (born 1954), American racing driver
- Hal Prince (1928–2019), American theatrical producer
- Hal Quick (1917-1974), American baseball player
- Hal Roach (1892–1992), American film producer
- Hal Roach (comedian) (1927–2012), Irish
- Hal Robson-Kanu (born 1989), Welsh footballer
- Hal Rogers (born 1937), American politician
- Hal Singer (1919–2020), American musician
- Hal Smith (disambiguation), multiple people, including
  - Hal Smith (actor) (1916–1994), American actor
  - Hal Smith (American football) (born 1935), American football player
  - Hal Smith (pitcher) (1902–1992), American baseball player
  - Hal R. Smith (1931–2014), American baseball player
  - Hal W. Smith (1930–2020), American baseball player
- Hal Sparks (born 1969), American actor
- Hal Steinbrenner (born 1969), American businessman
- Hal Sutton (born 1958), American golfer
- Hal Tarala, Canadian ice hockey player
- Hal Taussig, American academic
- Hal Taylor, American law enforcement officer
- Hal Thirlaway
- Hal Thompson (1922–2006), American football player
- Hal Tidrick, American basketball player
- Hal Toenes (1917-2004), American baseball player
- Hal Totten (1901–1985), American sportscaster
- Hal Trosky (1912–1979), American baseball player
- Hal Trosky Jr. (1936–2012), American baseball player
- Hal Trumble (1926–2010), American ice hockey official and executive
- Hal Tulchin (1926–2017), American film director
- Hal Turner, American Holocaust denier and radio host
- Hal Turpin (1903–1997), American baseball pitcher
- Hal Uderitz (born 1999), American soccer player
- Hal Underwood (born 1945), American golfer
- Hal Uplinger (1929–2011), American basketball player and TV producer
- Hal Varian (born 1947), American economist
- Hal Vaughan (1928–2013), American author and journalist
- Hal W. Vincent (1927–2015), US Marine Corps general
- Hal B. Wallis (1898–1986), American film producer
- Hal Williams (born 1938), American actor
- Hal Willis, pseudonym of English writer Charles Robert Forrester (1803–1850)
- Hal Willis (ice hockey) (born 1946), Canadian ice hockey player
- Hal Willis (singer) (1933–2015), Canadian singer
- Hal Yates (1899–1969), American screenwriter
- Hal Yinger (1919–2000), American college football and track and field coach and professor
- Hal Young (1890–1970), British cinematographer
- Hal Ziegler (1932–2012), American politician

== Fictional characters ==
- Prince Hal, later Henry V of England
- HAL 9000, a computer in Arthur C. Clarke's fiction
- Dr. Hal Emmerich, nicknamed Otacon, in the Metal Gear video games
- Hal Hunt, in the children's adventure novels by Willard Price
- Hal Jordan, known as Green Lantern, in DC Comics
- Hal Yorke, in the UK TV series Being Human
- Hal (A Series of Unfortunate Events), in the book and TV series A Series of Unfortunate Events
- Hal (Angry Birds), the green toucan bird with a boomerang ability
- Hal (Malcolm in the Middle), in the sitcom Malcolm in the Middle

== See also ==
- Hal (disambiguation)
- Hal (surname)
