= Harold Baker =

Harold Baker may refer to:

- Harold Baker (cricketer) (1884–1954), English cricketer
- Harold Baker (judge) (1929–2023), former federal judge
- Harold Baker (photographer) (1860–1942), British photographer
- Harold Napier Baker (c. 1877–1950), Anglican priest in Australia
- Harold Baker (politician) (1877–1960), British politician, Financial Secretary to the War Office 1912–1915
- H. A. Baker (1881–1971), American author and Pentecostal missionary
- George Harold Baker (1877–1916), lawyer, political figure, and soldier from Quebec, Canada
- Harold Brooks-Baker (1933–2005), American-British financier, journalist, and publisher, and self-proclaimed expert on genealogy
- Shorty Baker (1914–1966), American jazz musician

== See also ==
- Harry Baker (disambiguation)
- Harald Baker (1882–1962), Australian rugby union player
