= Hal (surname) =

Hal is a surname. Notable people with the name include:

- Andre Hal (born 1992), American football player
- Fatéma Hal (born 1952), Moroccan chef
- Jean Ven Robert Hal (born 1970), Italian electronic musician

== See also ==
- Hal (disambiguation)
- Hal (given name)
