= Harold =

Harold may refer to:

== People ==
- Harold (given name), including a list of people and fictional characters with the name
- Harold (surname), surname in the English language
- András Arató, known in meme culture as "Hide the Pain Harold"

== Arts and entertainment ==
- Harold (film), a 2008 comedy film
- Harold, an 1876 poem by Alfred, Lord Tennyson
- Harold, the Last of the Saxons, an 1848 book by Edward Bulwer-Lytton, 1st Baron Lytton
- Harold or the Norman Conquest, an opera by Frederic Cowen
- Harold, an 1885 opera by Eduard Nápravník
- Harold & Kumar, a US movie; Harold/Harry is the main actor in the show.

== Places ==
In the United States

- Alpine, Los Angeles County, California, an erstwhile settlement that was also known as Harold
- Harold, Florida, an unincorporated community
- Harold, Kentucky, an unincorporated community
- Harold, Missouri, an unincorporated community

Elsewhere

- Harold, Ontario, Canada, a community in Stirling-Rawdon township

== Other uses ==
- Cyclone Harold
- Harold (horse), an American Thoroughbred racehorse
- Harold (improvisation), an improvisational form popularized by Del Close
- Harold Interlocking, a rail junction in New York City

== See also ==
- Harald (disambiguation)
- Harrold (disambiguation)
- Herald (disambiguation)
- Jesus H. Christ (folk paretymology)
