= Harbold =

Harbold is a surname. Notable people with the surname include:

- Alexandra Harbold (born 1965), American sprint canoeist
- Michael Harbold (born 1968), American sprint canoeist

== See also ==
- Harold (surname)
- Haubold
