= Harald =

Harald or Haraldr is the Old Norse form of the given name Harold. It may refer to:

== Middle Ages ==
=== Kings of Denmark ===
- Harald Bluetooth (935–985/986)

=== Kings of Norway ===
- Harald Fairhair (c. 850–c. 933)
- Harald Greycloak (died 970)
- Harald Hardrada (1015–1066)
- Harald Gille (reigned 1130–1136)

=== Grand Dukes of Kiev ===
- Mstislav the Great (1076–1132), known as Harald in Norse sagas

=== King of Mann and the Isles ===
- Haraldr Óláfsson (died 1248)

=== Earls of Orkney ===
- Harald Haakonsson (died 1131)
- Harald Maddadsson (c. 1134–1206)
- Harald Eiriksson

=== Others ===
- Hagrold (fl. 944–954), also known as Harald, Scandinavian chieftain in Normandy
- Harald Grenske (10th century), petty king in Vestfold in Norway
- Harald Klak (c. 785–c. 852), king in Jutland
- Harald Wartooth, legendary king of Sweden, Denmark and Norway
- Harald the Younger, 9th-century Viking leader

== Modern world ==
=== Royalty ===
- Harald V of Norway (1937–2026)
- Prince Harald of Denmark (1876–1949)

=== Academia ===
- Harald Beyer (literary historian) (1891–1960)
- Harald Bohr (1887–1951), Danish mathematician
- Harald Cramér (1893–1985), Swedish mathematician, actuary, and statistician
- Harald zur Hausen (1936–2023), German virologist
- Harald Helfgott (born 1977), Peruvian mathematician
- Harald Høffding (1843–1931), Danish philosopher and theologian
- Harald Keres (1912–2010), Estonian physicist
- Harald Herborg Nielsen (1903–1973), American physicist
- Harald Stümpke, pseudonym of Gerolf Steiner (1908–2009), German zoologist
- Harald Sverdrup (oceanographer) (Harald Ulrik Sverdrup, 1888–1957), Norwegian oceanographer and meteorologist
- Harald Welzer (born 1958), German social psychologist and author

=== Arts and entertainment ===
- Harald Blüchel (born 1963), German electronic music artist
- Herald Eelma (born 1934), Estonian printmaker, book illustrator and art educator
- Harald Glööckler (born 1965), German fashion designer
- Harald Heide-Steen Jr. (1939–2008), Norwegian actor and comedian
- Harald Juhnke (1929–2005), German actor and comedian
- Harald Lander (1905–1971), Danish ballet dancer and choreographer
- Harald Martenstein (born 1953), German journalist, columnist and writer
- Harald Reinl (1908–1986), Austrian film director
- Harald Rønneberg (born 1973), Norwegian television personality
- Harald Sæverud (1897–1992), Norwegian composer
- Harald Schmidt (born 1957), German actor and comedian
- Harald Serafin (1931–2025), Austrian opera singer and artistic director
- Harald Sverdrup (writer) (1923–1992), Norwegian poet and children's writer
- Harald Szeemann (1933–2005), Swiss curator and art historian
- Harald Zwart (born 1965), Norwegian film director

=== Military ===
- Harald Auffarth (1896–1946), German flying ace of the First World War
- Harald Freiherr von Elverfeldt (1900–1945), German general of the Second World War
- Harald Hægermark (1894–1965), Swedish Army lieutenant general
- Harald Nugiseks (1921–2014), Estonian army sergeant
- Harald Öhquist (1891–1971), Finnish general of the Second World War
- Harald Riipalu (1912–1961), Estonian military commander
- Harald Sunde (general) (born 1954), Norwegian military officer, Chief of Defence of Norway
- Harald Turner (1891–1947), German Nazi SS commander executed for war crimes
- Harald Nicolai Storm Wergeland (1814–1893), Norwegian military officer, politician and mountaineer
- Harald Åkermark (1873–1963), Swedish Navy vice admiral

=== Politics ===
- Harald Fälth (born 1947), Swedish jurist, politician and diplomat
- Harald Johan Løbak (1904–1985), Norwegian politician
- Harald T. Nesvik (born 1966), Norwegian politician
- Harald Orthey (born 1968), German politician
- Harald Petersen (1893–1970), Danish politician
- Harald Sandberg (born 1950), Swedish diplomat
- Harald Servus (born 1965), Austrian politician
- Harald Ulrik Sverdrup (politician) (1813–1891), Norwegian priest and politician

=== Sport ===
- Harald Aabrekk (born 1956), Norwegian footballer and coach
- Harald Østberg Amundsen (born 1998), Norwegian cross-country skier
- Harald Andersson (1907–1985), Swedish athlete
- Harald Baker (1882–1962), Australian rugby union footballer
- Harald Berg (born 1941), Norwegian footballer
- Harald Bohr (1887–1951), Danish Olympic football player and mathematician, and brother of Niels Bohr
- Harald Brattbakk (born 1971), Norwegian footballer
- Harald Cerny (born 1973), Austrian footballer
- Harald Grohs (born 1944), German racing driver
- Harald Grønningen (1934–2016), Norwegian skier
- Harald Hasselbach (1967–2023), Dutch football player
- Harald Hudak (1957–2024), German middle-distance runner
- Harald Kaarmann (1901–1942), Estonian footballer
- Harald Koch (born 1969), Austrian badminton player
- Harald Lechner (born 1982), Austrian professional football referee
- Harald Maartmann (1926–2021), Norwegian cross-country skier
- Harald Mothes (1956–2026), German footballer
- Harald Nielsen (1941–2015), Danish footballer
- Harald Nielsen (boxer) (1902–1983), Danish boxer
- Harald Økern (1898–1977), Norwegian skier
- Harald Schmid (born 1957), German athlete
- Harald Schumacher (born 1954), German footballer
- Harald Strøm (1897–1977), Norwegian speed skater
- Harald Sunde (footballer) (born 1944), Norwegian footballer
- Harald Tammer (1899–1942), Estonian journalist, athlete and weightlifter
- Harald Nilsen Tangen (born 2001), Norwegian footballer
- Harald Winkler (born 1962), Austrian bobsledder
- Harald Woxen (born 2008), Norwegian footballer

=== Other fields ===
- Harald T. Friis (1893–1976), Danish-American radio engineer
- Harald Løvenskiold (1926–1994), Norwegian businessman
- Harald Ulrik Sverdrup (engineer) (1846–1916), Norwegian engineer

== Fictional characters ==
- Harald Hilding Markurell, main character of the Swedish 1919 novel Markurells of Wadköping 1919 by Hjalmar Bergman
- Harald Petersen, a playwright in The Group (1963) by Mary McCarthy
- Harald, a supporting character in the Elbaph arc of the Japanese manga One Piece by Eiichiro Oda

== See also ==
- Harold (disambiguation)
- Herald (disambiguation)
- Herod (disambiguation)
