= Haroldo =

Haroldo is a Spanish and Portuguese variant of the English name Harold. It can refer to:

- Haroldo (footballer, 1896-1955), full name Haroldo Domingues, Brazilian football midfielder
- Haroldo (footballer, 1937-1990), full name Theodorico Haroldo de Oliveira, Brazilian football centre-back
- Haroldo (footballer, born 1931), full name Haroldo Rodrigues Magalhães Castro, Brazilian football defender
- Haroldo Christofani (1933–2020), Brazilian football winger
