= Henry Baker =

Henry Baker may refer to:

== Arts and entertainment ==
- Henry Baker (author) (1734–1766), English poet and essayist
- Henry A. Baker (1753–1836), Irish architect
- Henry Judd Baker (died 2016), American actor
- Henry Baker, fictional character in Arthur Conan Doyle's "The Adventure of the Blue Carbuncle"

== Military ==
- Henry Baker (soldier) (died 1689), Anglo-Irish soldier
- Sir Henry Baker, 2nd Baronet (1787–1859), British naval officer
- Charles Baker (Medal of Honor) (a.k.a. Henry Baker, 1809–1891), American Civil War sailor and Medal of Honor recipient
- Henry E. Baker (1857–1928), third African American to enter the United States Naval Academy

== Politics and law ==
- Henry Baker (Maryland politician) (died 1896), American politician from Maryland
- Henry M. Baker (1841–1912), U.S. Representative from New Hampshire
- Henry Baker (Australian politician) (1890–1968), Australian politician, Tasmanian Leader of the Opposition and President of the Legislative Council
- Henry Harold Peter Baker (1915–2004), Canadian politician in Saskatchewan

== Science and medicine ==
- Henry Baker (naturalist) (1698–1774), English naturalist
- Henry Albert Baker (1848–1934), American orthodontist
- Henry Brooks Baker (1837–1920), American public health pioneer
- H. F. Baker (Henry Frederick Baker, 1866–1956), English mathematician
- Henry Baker (computer scientist) (fl. late 20th century), American computer scientist

== Others ==
- Henry Williams Baker (1821–1877), English hymn writer
- Henry Baker (baseball) (1901–?), American Negro league baseball player
- Henry Baker (cricketer) (1904–1926), Australian-born New Zealand cricketer

== Other uses ==
- Henry Baker College, college in Kerala, India
- Henry W. Baker House, American historic site in Plymouth, Michigan

== See also ==
- Harry Baker (disambiguation)
- Henry Baker Tristram (1822–1906), English clergyman and ornithologist
