= Harold Walker =

Harold Walker may refer to:

- Harold Walker, Baron Walker of Doncaster (1927–2003), British Labour politician and life peer
- Harold Walker (British Army officer) (1862–1934), English general who led ANZAC forces in the First World War
- Harold Walker (Royal Navy officer) (1891–1975), Royal Navy admiral
- Harold Berners Walker (born 1932), former British Ambassador to Iraq, Bahrain and the UAE, son of Admiral Harold Walker
- Harold Walker (cricketer) (1918–2000), English cricketer
- Harold Walker (footballer) (1895–1935), Australian footballer
- Harold M. Walker (1904–1994), American animator
- Harold William Walker, Canadian Liberal politician from Ontario

== See also ==
- Hal Walker (1896–1972), American film director
- Harry Walker (disambiguation)
