= Harrold (surname) =

Harrold is a surname in the English language. In some cases the name may be an Anglicised form of the Irish Ó hArailt.

People with the surname Harrold include:

- Arthur Harrold (1854–1908), businessman and politician in South Australia
- Bert Harrold (1898–1968), Australian Rules footballer in Western Australia
- Harrold Brothers, Australian merchants and shipping company
- Jimmy Harrold (1892–1950), English footballer
- Kathryn Harrold (born 1950), American actress
- Luke Harrold (born 2008), New Zealand freestyle skier
- Mary Jean Harrold (1947–2013) American computer scientist
- Orville Harrold (1878–1933), American operatic tenor and musical theatre actor
- Rowland Harrold (1865–1924), South Australian dermatologist
- Sid Harrold, English footballer
- Thomas Leonard Harrold (1902–1973), US Army officer
- William Harrold (born 1988), English professional golfer

== See also ==
- Harold (surname)
