= Ann E. Dunwoody =

US Army general, first female to achieve four star rank

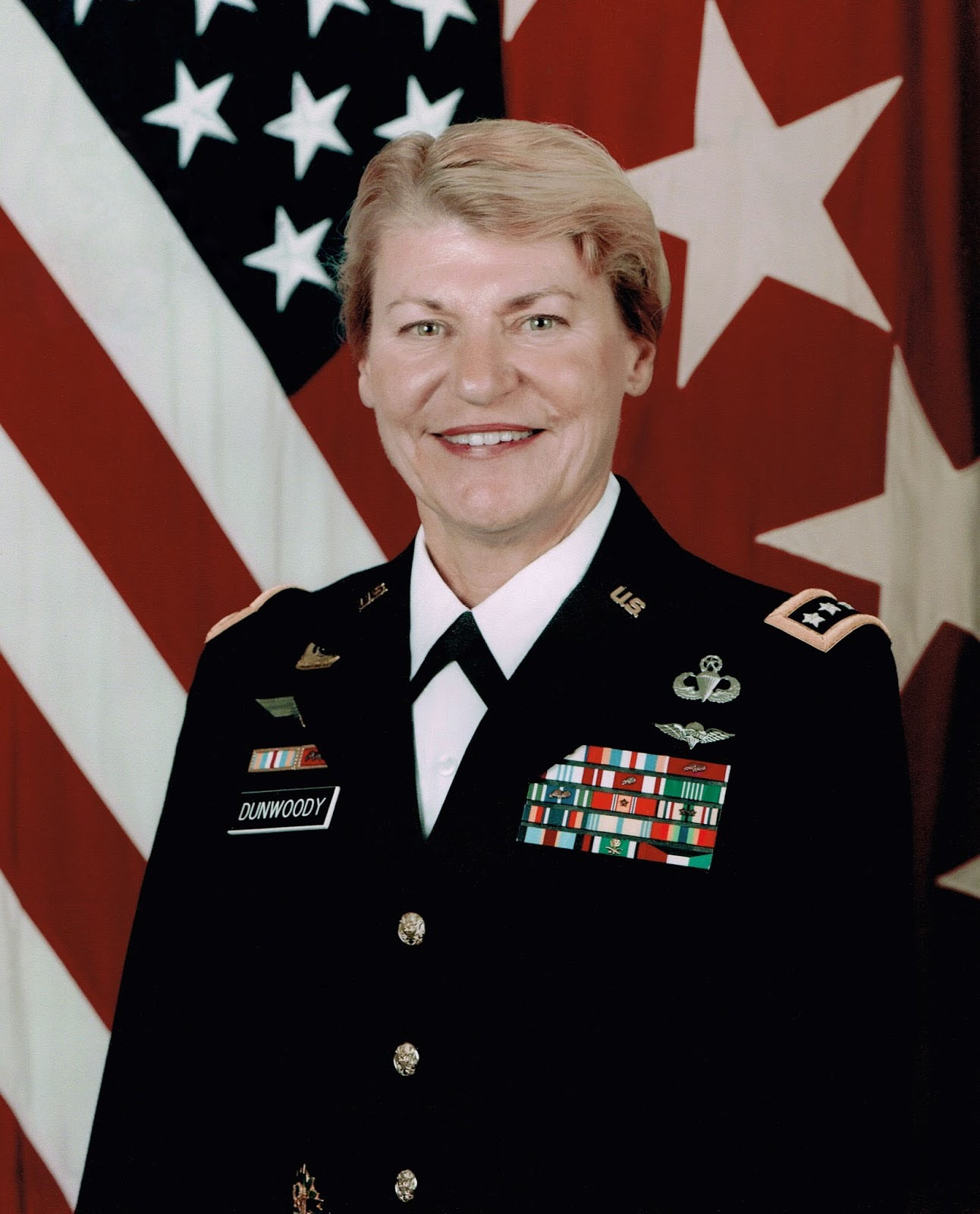
- Born: 14 January 1953 (age 73); Fort Belvoir, Virginia, U.S.
- Relatives: Henry Harrison Chase Dunwoody (great-grandfather)
- Military career
- Allegiance: United States
- Branch: United States Army
- Service years: 1975–2012
- Rank: General
- Commands: United States Army Materiel Command; United States Army Combined Arms Support Command; Military Traffic Management Command
- Conflicts: Gulf War
- Awards: Army Distinguished Service Medal (2); Defense Superior Service Medal; Legion of Merit (3)

Ann Elizabeth Dunwoody (born 14 January 1953) is a retired general of the United States Army. She was the first woman in United States military and uniformed service history to achieve a four-star officer rank, receiving her fourth star on 14 November 2008.

In 2005 Dunwoody became the United States Army's top-ranking female when she received the promotion to lieutenant general (three stars) and became the Army's Deputy Chief of Staff, G-4 (logistics). She was nominated as Commanding General, United States Army Materiel Command, by President George W. Bush on 23 June 2008, and confirmed by the Senate one month later. She served in that capacity until 7 August 2012, and retired from the Army on 15 August 2012.

== Early life and education ==
Dunwoody was born in 1953 at Fort Belvoir, Virginia to Elizabeth and Harold H. Dunwoody. Harold was a career U.S. Army officer who retired as a brigadier general, and Dunwoody's family followed him on assignment overseas. Ann lived in Germany and Belgium while growing up, graduating from Supreme Headquarters Allied Powers Europe (SHAPE) American High School in 1971.

At age 5, Dunwoody decided she wanted to become a doctor or nurse. Although she came from a family with a strong tradition of military service, she initially had very little interest in serving in the military. After high school Dunwoody attended State University of New York College at Cortland. During her junior year of college, Dunwoody attended a four-week Army introductory program that could be continued, if interested, with an eleven-week Women's Officer Orientation Course, which then led to a two-year commitment. In 1975 she committed, became a second lieutenant in the Quartermaster Corps and attended the United States Army Airborne School. It was then that she realized the Army was "an organization that was as values-based as the family I came out of, and to find probably my real passion was soldiering. I just didn't know it because I had never experienced it".

== Career ==
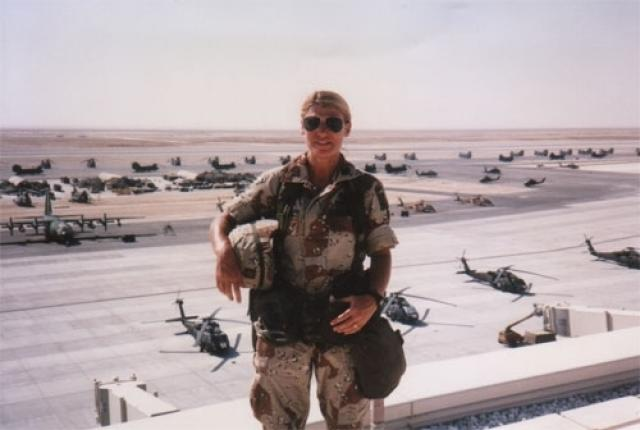
Dunwoody in the Middle East during Operation Desert Shield or Operation Desert Storm

In 1975, Dunwoody graduated from State University of New York College at Cortland with a degree in physical education—Cortland is a Top Ten school in that field—and was direct commissioned into the Women's Army Corps. In an interview with the Military Logistics Forum, Dunwoody explained what drew her to become a soldier:

I grew up in the Army and came from a family who, since 1862, has defended our nation. My great grandfather, my grandfather, my father, my brother, my sister, my niece, and my husband are all veterans of this country's wars. My father is a veteran of three wars and is one of the 25 million veterans living today who served the nation with such incredible courage.
While I joined the Army right out of college, I planned to only stay in the Army to complete my two-year commitment, but it wasn’t too long before I realized that there are no other shoes [boots] I would rather fill than the ones I am wearing right now. As a soldier, you can continually serve. It is a calling to be a soldier and there is a great sense of pride and camaraderie in serving the greatest Army in the world.

Dunwoody's first assignment was as a platoon leader with the 226th Maintenance Company, 100th Supply and Services Battalion, Fort Sill, Oklahoma. During her 30 years as a Quartermaster Corps officer she commanded the 226th Maintenance Company Fort Sill, Oklahoma; 5th Quartermaster Detachment (Airborne) Kaiserslautern, Germany; the 407th Supply and Service Battalion/ 782d Main Support Battalion (MSB), Fort Bragg, North Carolina; the 10th Mountain Division Support Command (DISCOM), Fort Drum, New York; the 1st Corps Support Command (1st COSCOM), Fort Bragg, North Carolina; the Military Traffic Management Command (MTMC)/Military Surface Deployment and Distribution Command (SDDC), Alexandria, Virginia; and the Combined Arms Support Command (CASCOM), Fort Lee, Virginia.

Dunwoody's major staff assignments include service as the Parachute Officer, 82nd Airborne Division; strategic planner for the Chief of Staff of the Army (CSA); Executive Officer to the Director, Defense Logistics Agency; and Deputy Chief of Staff for Logistics G-4.

From May 1989 to May 1991, Dunwoody served as executive officer and later division parachute officer for the 407th Supply and Transportation Battalion, 82nd Airborne Division, at Fort Bragg and deployed to Saudi Arabia for Operation Desert Shield/Operation Desert Storm. in 2001, As the 1st Corps Support Command Commander she deployed the Logistics Task Force in support of Operation Enduring Freedom 1 and stood up the Joint Logistics Command in Uzbekistan in support of Combined Joint Task Force (CJTF)-180. As Commander of Surface Deployment and Distribution Command (SDDC), she supported the largest deployment and redeployment of United States forces since World War II.

=== Sexual assault prevention ===
Dunwoody, along with George W. Casey Jr. were avid in pushing for a decrease in sexual assault within the United States Army. Dunwoody believes that the United States Army should set an example for the rest of the world and that they have "critical work left to do" in order to significantly decrease sexual assault, but they are making progress.

=== Logistics ===
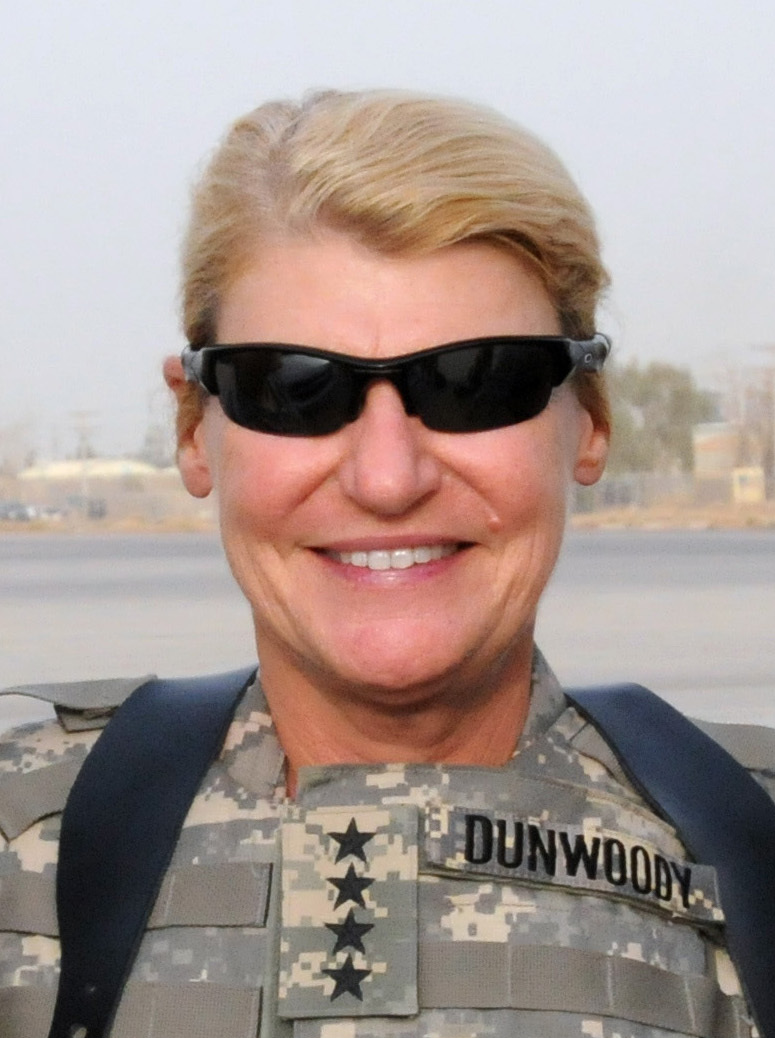
General Dunwoody at Joint Base Balad, Iraq in 2010

Dunwoody was in charge of all Army logistics. Her education came from the Florida Institute of Technology and the Industrial College of the Armed Forces. During her career, Dunwoody managed the largest global logistics command in Army history, with 69,000 military and civilian employees located in all 50 states and more than 140 countries, with a budget of $60 billion. She was also responsible for oversight of approximately $70 billion in service contracts and "managed and operationalized the Army's global supply chain for numerous engagements". Army Chief of Staff General Ray Odierno claimed that Dunwoody was "quite simply the best logistician the Army has ever had".

Dunwoody participated with First Lady Michelle Obama in a forum for promising girls in Washington, D.C. public schools in March 2009.

Dunwoody officially retired from the United States Army after 37 years on 15 August 2012.

=== Career firsts ===
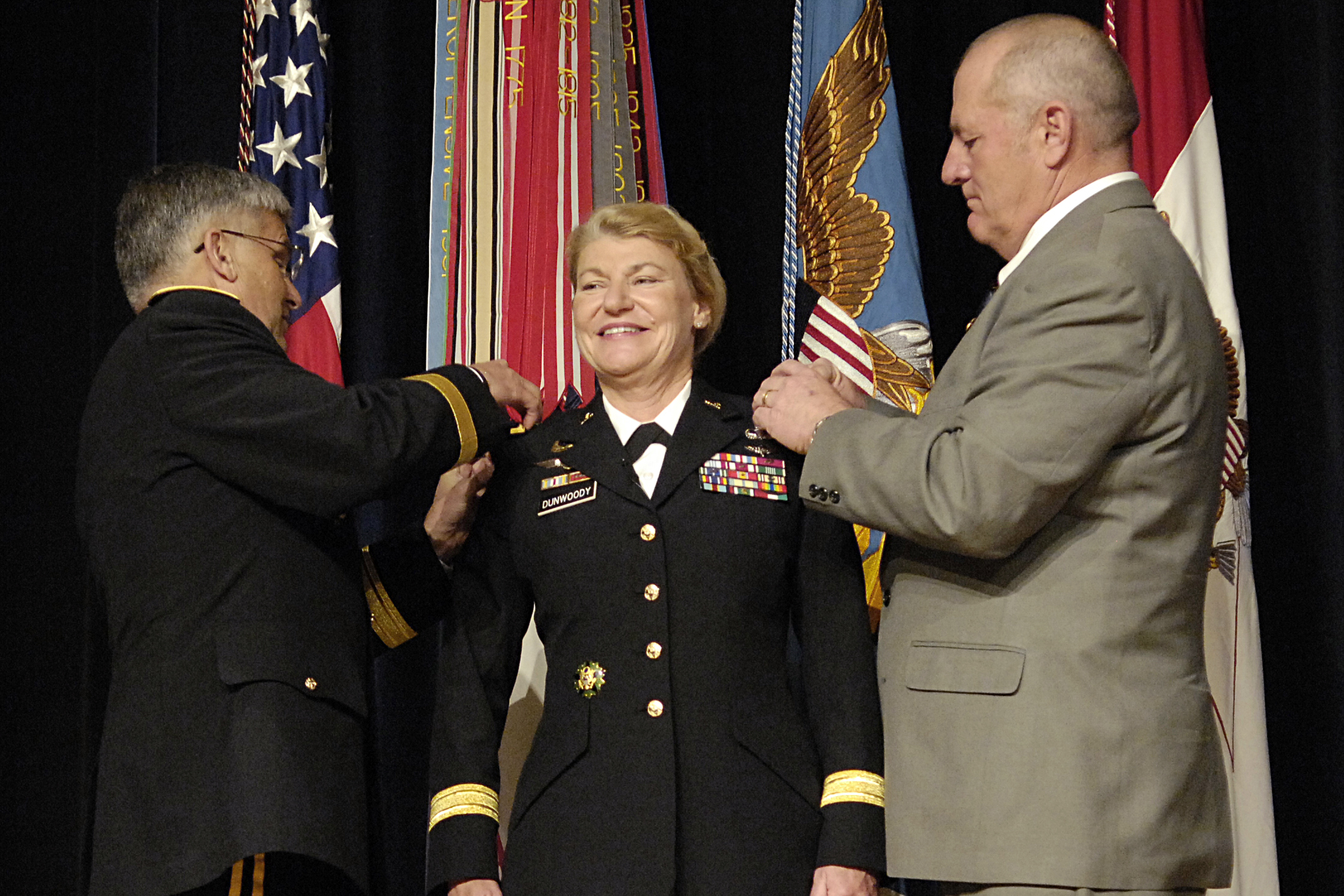
Dunwoody is pinned with her four stars by Army Chief of Staff General Casey and her husband Craig Brotchie at her promotion ceremony on 14 November 2008

Among her notable firsts, she became the first woman to command a battalion in the 82nd Airborne Division in 1992. She became Fort Bragg's first female general officer in 2000. She became the first woman to command the Combined Arms Support Command at Fort Lee, Virginia, in 2004. And in 2005, Dunwoody became the first female soldier to achieve three-star rank since Lieutenant General Claudia J. Kennedy, the former Deputy Chief of Staff for Intelligence, who retired in 2000.

On 14 November 2008, Dunwoody became the first woman in United States military history to achieve the rank of four-star general. Her promotion ceremony was held at the Pentagon, with introductory speeches by United States Secretary of Defense Robert Gates and Army Chief of Staff General George W. Casey.

Casey's successor as Army chief of staff, General Raymond T. Odierno, intended to recommend Dunwoody to succeed Air Force general Duncan J. McNabb as commander of the United States Transportation Command in 2011, which would have made her the first Army general to lead TRANSCOM as well as the first female combatant commander. Dunwoody, citing the physical toll of her present duties, declined the offer, opting to retire after finishing her tour at AMC. The aforementioned milestones were instead filled by Army general Stephen R. Lyons and Air Force general Lori J. Robinson respectively.

== Education ==
- Graduated from the State University of New York College at Cortland in 1975, receiving a bachelor's degree in Physical Education.
- Quartermaster Officers’ Basic Course and Basic Airborne School in 1976
- Quartermaster Officers Advanced Course
- Command and General Staff College
- Master of Science Degree in Logistics Management from the Florida Institute of Technology in 1988.
- Master of Science degree in National Resource Strategy from the Industrial College of the Armed Forces in 1995.
- United States Army Jumpmaster Course graduate.

== Personal life ==
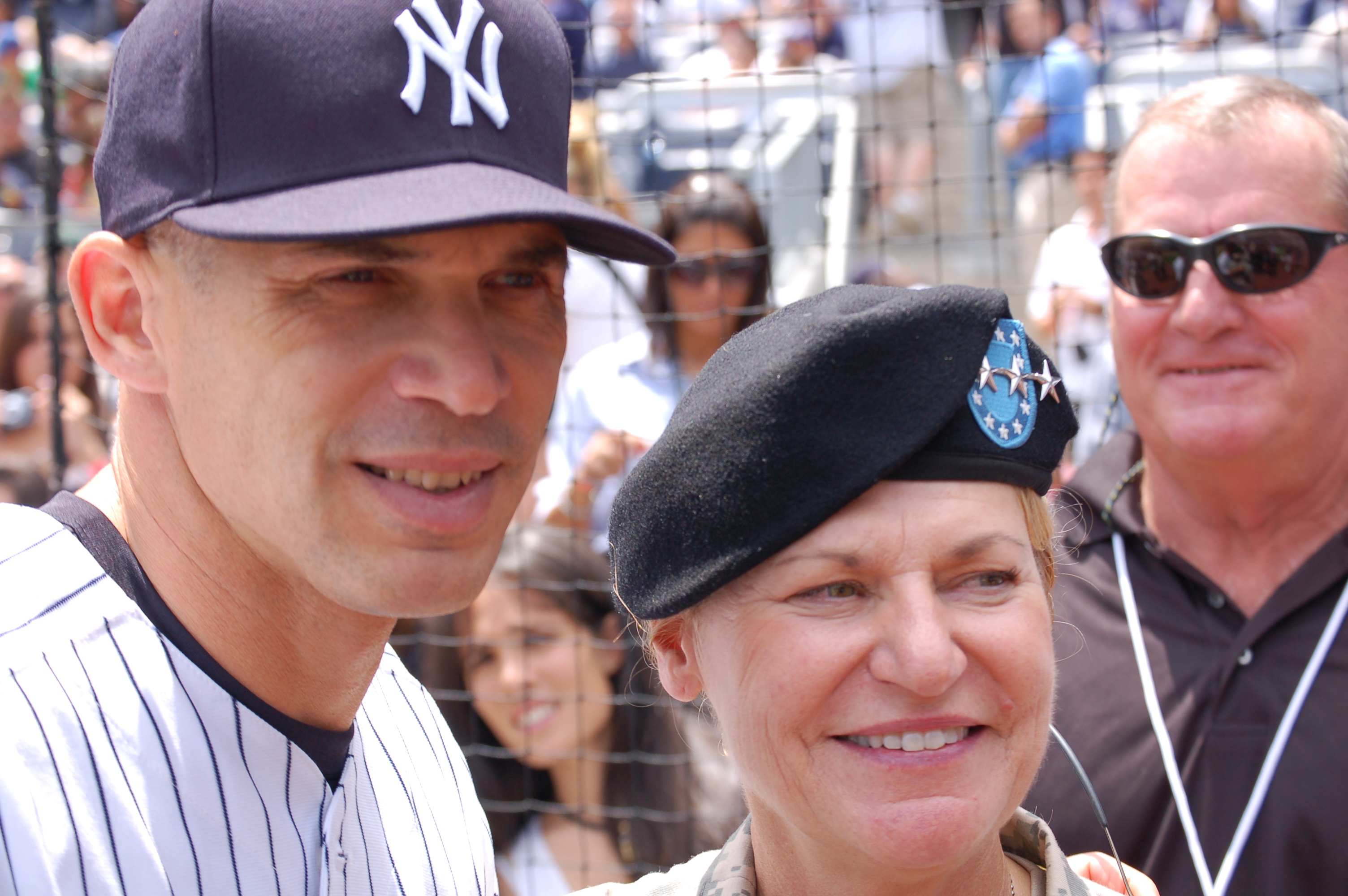
New York Yankees manager Joe Girardi with General Dunwoody during the Yankees vs. New York Mets game on 14 June 2009

Dunwoody was born to Harold and Elizabeth Dunwoody. She has two siblings: Harold H. "Buck" Dunwoody (First Lieutenant-Army), and Susan Schoeck (Army pilot). In 1989 she married Colonel Craig Brotchie, USAF. They have no children, but own a dog named Barney. Dunwoody currently lives with her husband in Tampa, Florida where her brother and sister live, and where her husband currently serves on the board of the Special Operations Warrior Foundation.

Dunwoody has a long family history of United States military service—going back five generations. She grew up in a military household. Her great-grandfather, Brigadier General Henry Harrison Chase Dunwoody, a 1866 graduate of the United States Military Academy, was the Chief Signal Officer in Cuba from 1898 to 1901. Her father retired from the United States Army as a brigadier general in 1973. Brigadier General Dunwoody is a highly decorated veteran of World War II, the Korean War and the Vietnam War. He was badly wounded in France during World War II and earned the Distinguished Service Cross for bravery while serving as a battalion commander in the Korean War. As a brigadier general, he commanded the 1st Brigade, 5th Infantry Division (Mechanized) during the Vietnam War. Her brother, Harold H. "Buck" Dunwoody Jr. is a 1970 West Point graduate. Her older sister, Susan Schoeck, was the third woman in the army to become a helicopter pilot. Her niece, Jennifer Schoeck, is a United States Air Force fighter pilot.

Dunwoody is the daughter of Harold Dunwoody, her inspiration "My own personal hero is my dad, he is a proud World War II, Korea, Vietnam veteran," she said. "And he was a real soldier's soldier. And much of who I am is founded on what I learned from my dad, as a soldier, as a patriot, and as a father".

== Military awards, decorations, and honors ==
Dunwoody's military awards and decorations include:

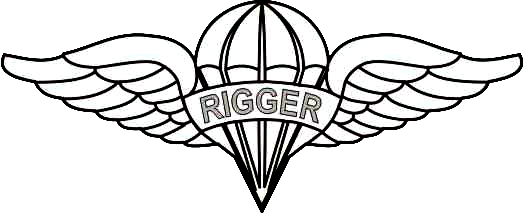
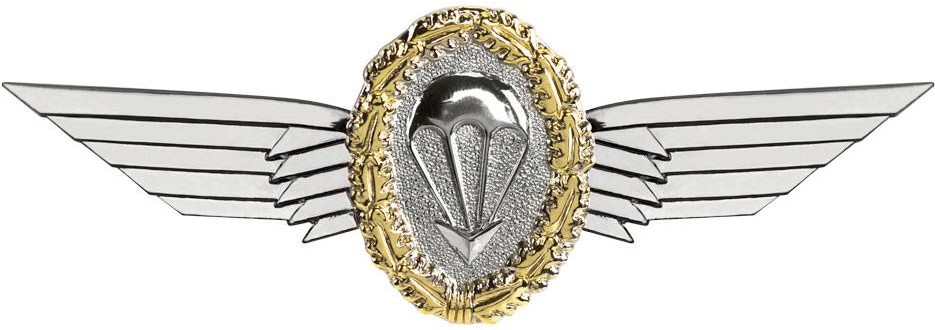
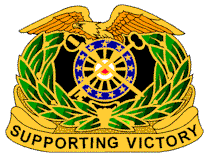
Master Parachutist Badge
Parachute Rigger Badge
Army Staff Identification Badge
82nd Infantry Division Combat Service Identification Badge
Silver German Parachutist Badge
U.S. Army Quartermaster Corps Distinctive Unit Insignia

Army Distinguished Service Medal (with one bronze oak leaf cluster)
Defense Superior Service Medal
Legion of Merit (with two bronze oak leaf clusters)
Defense Meritorious Service Medal
Meritorious Service Medal with six oak leaf clusters
Army Commendation Medal
Army Achievement Medal with two oak leaf clusters
Joint Meritorious Unit Award
Meritorious Unit Commendation with four oak leaf clusters
National Defense Service Medal (with one service star)
Southwest Asia Service Medal (with two service stars)
Global War on Terrorism Service Medal
Armed Forces Reserve Medal
Army Service Ribbon
Army Overseas Service Ribbon
French National Order of Merit (degree unknown)
Kuwait Liberation Medal (Saudi Arabia)
Kuwait Liberation Medal (Kuwait)

=== Other honors ===
- 1998 Recipient of the Military Distinguished Order of Saint Martin (Army Quartermaster Corps).
- 2001 Distinguished Alumna for Cortland State SUNY.
- 2002 Inducted as a Distinguished Member of the Quartermaster Regiment.
- 2004 Recipient of the National Defense Transportation Association's DoD Distinguished Service Award.
- 2007 Recipient of Military Order of the World Wars (MOWW) Distinguished Service Award.
- 2008 First female four-star general in the United States Armed Services.
- 2012 Inducted into the Quartermaster Hall of Fame
- 2012 Recipient Ancient Order of Saint Martin (Army Quartermaster Corps)
- 2009 recipient of the Association of the Industrial College of the Armed Forces Eisenhower Award
- 2011 recipient of the National Collegiate Athletic Association's Theodore Roosevelt Award
- 2011 recipient of the French National Order of Merit
- 2013 Inducted into the U.S. Army Women's Foundation Hall of Fame
- Keys to: Madison County, Huntsville city and Madison city
- USO Woman of the Year
- 2018 Honorary Doctorate of Humanities. Michigan State University
- 2019 recipient of the Sylvanus Thayer Award

== See also ==
- List of female United States military generals and flag officers

Military offices
Preceded by Benjamin S. Griffin	Commander of United States Army Materiel Command; 2008–2012	Succeeded by Dennis L. Via
