= Haubold =

Haubold is a surname. Notable people with the surname include:

- Frank Haubold (1906–1985), American gymnast
- Irma Haubold (1908–1996), American gymnast, wife of Frank
- Hartmut Haubold (born 1941), German paleontologist
- Ingrid Haubold (born 1943), German operatic soprano
- Olaf Schubert, (born Michael Haubold in 1967), German comedian and musician

== See also ==
- Harbold
