= Harry Walker (disambiguation) =

Harry Walker (1918–1999) was an American baseball player, manager and coach.

Harry Walker may also refer to:

- Harry C. Walker (1873–1932), Lieutenant Governor of New York
- Harry G. R. Walker (1912–1978), former mayor of Regina, Saskatchewan, Canada
- Harry Walker (cricketer) (1760–1805), English cricketer
- Harry Walker (footballer) (1916–1976), English football goalkeeper
- Harry G. Walker (1892–1982), Australian rules footballer
- Harry Walker (politician) (1873–1950), company director and member of the Queensland Legislative Assembly
- Harry Walker (rugby union, born 1915) (1915–2018), English rugby union player
- Harry Walker (rugby union, born 1928) (1928–2008), South African rugby union player
- Harry Walker: pseudonym used by Hillary Waugh (1920–2008), American mystery novelist

== See also ==
- Henry Walker (disambiguation)
- Harold Walker (disambiguation)
