= HAL =

HAL may refer to:

== Aviation ==
- Halali Airport (IATA airport code: HAL) Halali, Oshikoto, Namibia
- Hawaiian Airlines (former ICAO airline code: HAL)
- HAL Airport, Bengaluru, India
- Hindustan Aeronautics Limited an Indian aerospace manufacturer of fighter aircraft and helicopters

== Businesses ==
- HAL Allergy, a Dutch pharmaceutical company
- HAL Computer Systems, a defunct computer manufacturer
- HAL Laboratory, a Japanese video game developer
- Halliburton's New York Stock Exchange ticker symbol
- Hamburg America Line, a shipping company
- Hindustan Aeronautics Limited, an Indian aerospace manufacturer of fighter aircraft and helicopters
- Hindustan Antibiotics Limited, an Indian public sector pharmaceutical manufacturer
- Holland America Line, a cruise ship operator
- HAL FM, or CHNS-FM, a classic rock station in Halifax, Nova Scotia

== Computing ==
- Hardware abstraction layer, a layer of software that hides hardware differences from higher level programs
  - hal.dll, a critical system file in Microsoft Windows acting between the operating system and the computer's hardware
- HAL (software), an implementation of a hardware abstraction layer for Unix-like systems
- HAL/S, the computer language used to program the Space Shuttle's computers
- HAL, a Lotus Development product released in 1986
- Hackers at Large, a Dutch hackers and security conference
- Hypertext Application Language, a standard convention for defining hypermedia such as links to external resources within JSON or XML code

== Entertainment ==
- HAL 9000, a fictional computer in the Space Odyssey series
- Hal (Japanese band), a Japanese pop band
- Hal (Irish band), an Irish rock band
- H.A.L. (G.I. Joe), a fictional weapon in the G.I. Joe universe

== Other ==
- HAL (automobile), a car built in Cleveland 1916-1918
- HAL (gene), which encodes the enzyme histidine ammonia-lyase
- HAL (open archive) (Hyper Articles en Ligne), a French online research open archive
- Hybrid Assistive Limb, a powered exoskeleton suit
- Het Amsterdams Lyceum, a Dutch secondary school
- Hindustan Aeronautics Limited SC, a football club in Bangalore, India
- Hyperspace Analogue to Language, a semantic memory model
- Hyundai A-League, an Australian professional association football league
- Halim LRT station, a light rail station in Jakarta, Indonesia

== See also ==
- Hal (disambiguation)
- Hot air leveling, surface finish in printed circuit boards manufacturing
