= Harry Baker =

Harry Baker may refer to:

- Harry Baker (footballer, born 1990), English footballer
- Harry Baker (Australian footballer) (1907–1992), Australian footballer for Footscray
- Harry L. Baker Jr. (1912–1973), president of the Georgia Tech Research Corporation
- Harry Frederick Baker (1904–1986), Australian speedway motorcycle rider and aviator
- Harry Baker, inventor of the Chiffon cake
- Harry Baker, sound engineer for Our Gang
- Harry C. Baker (1886/7–1939), American entrepreneur
- Harry Baker (poet) (born 1992), British spoken word artist, author and poet
- Harry Daniel Baker (born 1937), Canadian politician

== See also ==
- Harold Baker (disambiguation)
- Henry Baker (disambiguation)
