= 407th Forward Support Battalion =

407th Light Support Battalion
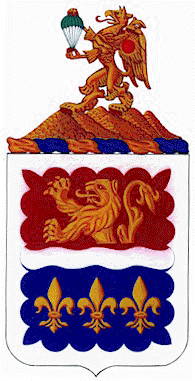
- Coat of arms
- Active: 1917
- Country: United States of America
- Branch: U.S. Army
- Part of: 82nd Airborne Division
- Garrison/HQ: Fort Bragg, North Carolina
- Nickname: Golden Griffins
- Motto: "Supply is Strength"
- Engagements: World War I World War II; Operation Power Pack; Operation Urgent Fury; Operation Just Cause; Operation Desert Shield; Operation Desert Storm; Operation Restore Democracy; 2003 Invasion of Iraq; Operation Iraqi Freedom

Commanders
- Current commander: Lt. Col. Jason Day
- Notable commanders: Lt. Col. Ann E. Dunwoody

Insignia
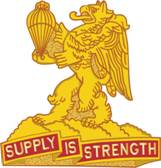
- Distinctive unit insignia

- Unit beret flash

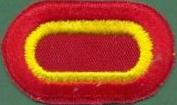
- Unit background trimming

The 407th Light Support Battalion is part of the U.S. Army and based at Fort Bragg, North Carolina part of the 82nd Airborne Division. The battalion was formed during World War I and has fought in many conflicts and has helped countries damaged by disasters since.

== History ==
=== World War I ===
Originally designated the 407th Supply Train (Motor), the unit was activated on 5 August 1917 at Camp Gordon, Georgia as the country was building up for World War I. The unit was part of the 82d Infantry Division, which was assigned to the American Expeditionary Force on the Western Front in France. The supply train served during the American offensive on the St. Mihiel Salient and during the severe fighting in the Argonne Forest.

After the Armistice, the unit was demobilized in 1919, and reorganized two years later in the organized reserves as the 82d Division Train, Quartermaster Corps. After several other changes in designation, the Supply Train finally received its present-day numerical designation as the 407th Quartermaster Regiment on 1 July 1936.

=== World War II ===
Following the attack on Pearl Harbor, the 82d, along with the 407th, was called to active duty on 25 March 1942 at Camp Claiborne, Louisiana. On 15 August of that same year, the 407th became the 407th Airborne Quartermaster Company. The 407th then supported the division in both Sicily and Italy.

When the division went into Normandy, the 407th arrived there with the glider forces and the seaborne forces. The 407th also participated in the glider assault into the Netherlands. For these two operations, the 407th is credited with two arrowheads (initial assault) on its battle streamers.

In the years after World War II, the 407th finally became a full battalion.

=== Post World War II ===
On 1 September 1957, the unit reorganized as the 407th Supply and Transportation Battalion. In this configuration, the 407th served in the Dominican Republic for Operation POWER PACK in Grenada for Operation URGENT FURY, in Panama for Operation Just Cause, and in Saudi Arabia and Iraq for Operations Desert Shield and Desert Storm and Operation Iraqi Freedom.

=== Post 1990 ===
On 22 October 1993, the unit took its present-day form as the multi-functional 407th Light Support Battalion. In this configuration, the unit provides all direct support logistical needs as part of the Division's 2d Brigade Task Force. During Operation Restore Democracy in Haiti, the 407th was ready to deploy with Task Force Falcon, only to be stood down at the last minute.

From January until September 2017, 407th Brigade Support Battalion (led by LTC Elizabeth H. Curtis) deployed to Kuwait and Iraq as a part of Task Force Falcon (led by COL J. Patrick Work) in support of Operation Inherent Resolve. They played a critical role in the advise and assist efforts that led to the liberation of Mosul on 20 July 2017. Of note, LTC Curtis was the second female battalion commander in the history of the unit (the first was Ret. Gen. Ann Dunwoody) and the first woman to lead the organization through a combat deployment.

The soldiers of the 407th perform many tasks: pumping fuel from a forward area refueler, transporting critical ammunition, issuing food and supplies, fixing damaged vehicles, maintaining the brigade's weapons systems, issuing repair parts, or treating and evacuating casualties from the drop zone.

== Past commanders ==
- Lieutenant Colonel Ann E. Dunwoody
- Lieutenant Colonel Raymond Mason
- Lieutenant Colonel Thomas Rogers
- Lieutenant Colonel William Hughes
- Lieutenant Colonel Jeffrey Douville
- Lieutenant Colonel F.D. (SAM) Samonte
- Lieutenant Colonel Robert (Bob) Cursio, Jr.
- Lieutenant Colonel Terry Juskowiak
- Lieutenant Colonel James Jennings
- Lieutenant Colonel Matthew Shatzkin
- Lieutenant Colonel Shawn Schuldt
- Lieutenant Colonel Matthew Bresko
- Lieutenant Colonel Elizabeth H. Curtis
- Lieutenant Colonel Steven M. Dubuc
- Lieutenant Colonel Charles M. Diggs
- Lieutenant Colonel K. Felix
- (Current) Lieutenant Colonel Jason Day

== Coat of arms ==
The griffin (a composite of eagle and lion) symbolizes the coordinated campaign of the Allies. The five hills represent the liberation of the city of Nijmegen. The roundel, simulating a wheel, alludes to the Quartermaster and Transportation Corps. The parachute with its nine cords refers to the nine campaigns in which the parent unit participated during World Wars I and II. The colors commemorate the decorations awarded the 407th: red and green for the Belgian Fourragere, red for the Meritorious Unit Commendation and orange for the Netherlands Lanyard.

The two divisions of the shield are used to denote service during World Wars I and II. The fleurs-de-lis symbolize the original organization's action during World War I in Lorraine, Saint Mihiel and Meuse-Argone, France. The rampant lion, suggested by the coat of arms of Belgium and the Netherlands, alludes to the former organization's drive during World War II to stem the invading enemy; and the wavy bar alludes to the wavy bend on the arms of Rhineland signifying the sweep through that province during the same campaign. The engrailed border represents a parachute and symbolizes that unit's service with the 82d Airborne Division.
