= Haraldur =

Haraldur [ˈhaːrˌaltʏr̥] is a masculine Icelandic given name. Notable people with the name include:

- Haraldur Benediktsson (born 1966), Icelandic politician
- Haraldur Freyr Guðmundsson (born 1981), Icelandic professional football defender
- Haraldur Ingi Þorleifsson (born 1977), Icelandic entrepreneur and philanthropist
- Haraldur Ingólfsson (born 1970), Icelandic former footballer
- Haraldur Kálvsson, from the year 1412 was First Minister of the Faroe Islands
- Haraldur Sigurdsson (born 1939), Icelandic volcanologist and geochemist
- Haraldur Vignir Sveinbjörnsson (born 1975), Icelandic composer and music arranger
