= Iris Global =

Christian organization headquartered in Redding, California, US

- Abbreviation: IG
- Formation: 1980
- Founder: Heidi Baker and Rolland Baker
- Type: Mission Organization
- Headquarters: Redding, CA, USA
- Location: Africa, the Americas, Asia, Europe, the Middle East
- Website: www.irisglobal.org
- Formerly called: Iris Ministries, Inc.

Iris Global, previously Iris Ministries, is a Christian interdenominational, missionary organization that provides humanitarian aid in Africa, the Americas, Asia, Europe, and the Middle East. Members of Iris seek to spread the gospel while performing humanitarian activities.

== History ==
Iris was founded in 1980 by Rolland Baker and Heidi Baker. First based in the United States, the organization initially undertook short-term evangelism trips overseas. In 1985, the Bakers began to work with the poor in Indonesia and then Hong Kong. The organization began operating in London in 1992.

Iris became active in Mozambique, Africa in 1995. In 1996, Iris took over an orphanage housing 80 children, which had previously been run by communist leaders. However, when the number of children grew from 80 to 320, the previous government leaders put a price on Heidi's head. The government also banned the singing of Christian songs in the orphanage, prayer, and the unauthorized distribution of food and clothing.

== Initiatives ==
While searching out and caring for the poor and needy, Iris volunteers have founded thousands of churches, Bible and ministry training schools, medical clinics, church-based orphan care programs, children's villages, primary schools, cottage industries, widows' programs, vocational training and well drilling projects. Iris volunteers make regular visits to care for children living at a dump, and the organization combats the second-class status of women and girls by campaigning for equality of the sexes.

=== Orphanages ===
In 2015, Iris Global has expanded its work to provide food, clothing, and shelter to thousands of orphans. The organization has networks of church-based orphan care in all ten provinces in Mozambique as well as bases in main cities, including a base in Pemba which houses 200 orphans and several baby houses for abandoned infants.

=== Churches ===
Iris initially established churches in Indonesia, Hong Kong, and London, and later one in Mozambique. By June 2001, Iris had initiated 1,800 churches, including about 1,200 in Malawi. In 2015 Iris has networks of churches throughout Mozambique as well as bases in main cities. Two thousand churches have been organized among the Makua people over a span of eight years.

=== Conferences ===
Iris conducts a series of gospel conferences worldwide. In Africa, the conferences are attended by poor people, many of whom walk long distances to attend. As many as 10,000 people crowd makeshift platforms to hear the gospel.

=== Schools ===
Iris opened Harvest Schools at which local students and visiting Westerners receive training to become pastors. These students study for six-month terms or for three-month terms once a year for four years. The organization also organizes primary schools on its bases, in which more than 2,500 students at a time are taught to read and write.

=== Medical ===
Iris leaders pray for the healing of those with hearing and vision impairments during village outreaches in rural Mozambique. Iris bases include medical clinics from which the poor can receive free care. Iris workers sometimes pay for life-saving medical care for others, and the organization has handed out condoms in an effort to combat the AIDS pandemic.

== Criticism and controversies ==
The Bakers have claimed that prayer has restored sight and hearing, which was assessed and confirmed by researchers in a peer-reviewed article published by the Southern Medical Journal. They have also claimed that people have been raised from the dead. The group has been criticized by medical and government officials for these claims.
