= Harrold =

Harrold may refer to:

== Places ==
- Harrold, Bedfordshire in the United Kingdom
- Harrold, South Dakota in the United States
- Harrold, Texas in the United States
- Harrold Independent School District serving Harrold, Texas, United States

== People ==
- Harrold (surname), surname in the English language
