= Oliver Baker =

British artist (1856–1939)

- Born: 1856
- Died: 1939 (aged 82–83)
- Occupations: Painter, etcher, designer and silversmith

Oliver Baker (1856–1939) was an English painter, etcher, designer and silversmith, best known for his role in the development of the Cymric Silverware line for Liberty & Co.

Baker was born in Birmingham, the son of the artist Samuel Henry Baker. He studied under his father, with whom he shared a studio in Edgbaston, and at the Birmingham School of Art. He exhibited at the Royal Academy frequently from 1883 and was elected a member of the Royal Birmingham Society of Artists in 1884.

His younger brother Harold (1860–1942) was a noted photographer.
