= Ó hArailt =

- Ó hArailt in a Gaelic type.
- Gender: Masculine
- Language: Irish

Other gender
- Feminine: Ní Arailt, Bean Uí Arailt, Uí Arailt

Origin
- Language: Irish
- Meaning: "descendant of Arailt"

Other names
- Anglicisations: Harold, Harrold

Ó hArailt is a masculine surname in the Irish language. The name translates into English as "descendant of Arailt". The surname originated as a patronym, however it no longer refers to the actual name of the bearer's grandfather. There are specific forms of the surname that are borne by married and unmarried females. There are also numerous Anglicised forms of the surname. The surname is borne by a family in Limerick that is said to be of Norse origin.

Capitalised as: Ó hARAILT or Ó ʜARAILT, the first 'h' should always be either lowercase, or a smaller 'H' font size.

== Etymology ==
Ó hArailt translates into English as "descendant of Arailt". The surname originated as a patronym, however it no longer refers to the actual name of the bearer's grandfather. The name Arailt is a Gaelic derivative of the Old Norse personal name Haraldr.

== Feminine forms ==
Ó hArailt is a masculine surname. The form of this surname for unmarried females is Ní Arailt; this name translates into English as "daughter of the descendant of Arailt". The form of this surname for married females is Bean Uí Arailt, or simply Uí Arailt; these surnames translate to "wife of the descendant of Arailt".

== Anglicised forms ==
The surname has historically been Anglicised variously as: Harold, and Harrold.

== Families ==
According to Patrick Woulfe, there is a family of the name in Limerick that is apparently of Norse origin.
