= Hal =

Hal may refer to:

== Places ==
- Hal, Azerbaijan, a village
- Hal, French name of Halle, Belgium, a city and municipality
- Hal, Elâzığ, Turkey, a village

== Arts and entertainment ==
- Hal (Irish band)
- Hal (Japanese band)
- Hal (2013 film), a Japanese animation
- Hal (2018 film), an American documentary
- Hal Jordan, DC Comics superhero

== Other uses ==
- Hal (given name)
- Hal (Sufism)
- Hal (cuneiform), a sign
- HAL (open archive), a research archive
- HAL 9000, a computer in Arthur C. Clarke's fiction
- 9000 Hal, an asteroid
- hal.dll, the hardware abstraction layer, a critical system file in Microsoft Windows acting between the operating system and the computer's hardware

== Companies ==
- HAL, acronym of Hindustan Aeronautics Limited, a major India defense manufacturer.

== See also ==
- Harold (disambiguation)
- Henry (disambiguation)
- HAL (disambiguation)
