= Heidi Baker =

Christian missionary, speaker, and writer

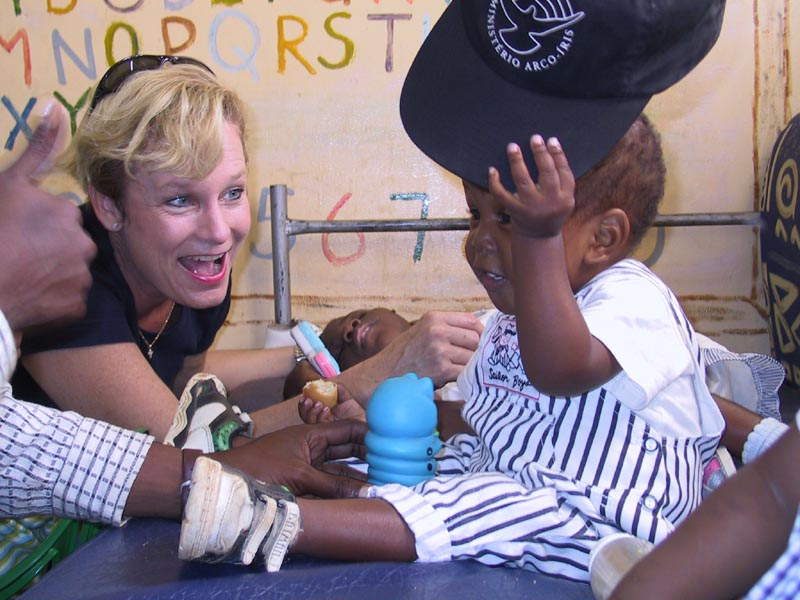
- Baker in one of the Iris Global children's centers
- Born: August 29, 1959 (age 67); Laguna Beach, California, United States
- Education: Vanguard University; King's College London
- Occupations: President and CEO of Iris Global; Missionary; Author; Speaker
- Spouse: Rolland Baker
- Children: 2
- Website: irisglobal.org

Heidi Gayle Baker (born August 29, 1959) is a Christian missionary, itinerant speaker, and the CEO of Iris Global, a Christian humanitarian organization. She is the author of several books on Christian spirituality.

== Early life ==
Heidi Gayle Farrell was born to James Moies Farrell and Glenetta Betty Farrell, née Schacht (1930–2015), an English teacher. She grew up in Southern California, becoming a Christian after hearing a Navajo preacher's message during a revival meeting. She has a Bachelor of Arts and a Master of Arts from Vanguard University, and a PhD in systematic theology from King's College London (1995).

== Career ==
She met Rolland Baker, the grandson of missionary H. A. Baker, in 1979. They married six months later in 1980; they left for the mission field two weeks after that. They were ordained as ministers in 1985.

In 1980, the Bakers founded Iris Global, a non-profit Christian ministry dedicated to charitable service and evangelism, particularly in developing nations.

In 1995, the Bakers moved to Mozambique in order to begin a new ministry focused on the care of orphaned and abandoned children.

Iris Global negotiated with the Mozambican government to assume financial and administrative responsibility for a former government orphanage in Chihango, near the capital city of Maputo. There were roughly 80 children present.

Candy Gunther Brown, professor of religious studies at Indiana University, has called the Bakers "among the most influential leaders in world Pentecostalism."

== Bibliography ==
- There Is Always Enough, with Rolland Baker. Chosen Books (2003) ISBN 1-85240-287-3
- The Hungry Always Get Fed: A Year of Miracles with Rolland Baker. New Wine Press (2007) ISBN 978-1-903725-85-6
- Expecting Miracles: True Stories of God's Supernatural Power and How You Can Experience It, with Rolland Baker. Chosen Books (2007) ISBN 978-0-8007-9434-7
- Compelled by Love, with Shara Pradhan. Charisma House (2008) ISBN 978-1-59979-351-1
- Learning to Love: Passion, Compassion and the Essence of the Gospel with Rolland Baker. Chosen Books (2013) ISBN 978-0-8007-9552-8
- Birthing the Miraculous: The Power of Personal Encounters with God to Change Your Life and the World. Charisma House (2014) ISBN 978-1-62136-219-7
- Reckless Devotion: 365 Days into the Heart of Radical Love with Rolland Baker. Baker Publishing Group (2014) ISBN 978-0-80-079584-9
- Daily Insights to Birthing the Miraculous: 100 Devotions for Reflection and Prayer. Charisma House (2016) ISBN 978-1-62-998914-3
- Training for Harvest: Stopping for the One, Believing for the Multitudes with Rolland Baker. Destiny Image Incorporated (2017) ISBN 978-0-76-841078-5
- Living from the Presence Interactive Manual: Principles for Walking in the Overflow of God’s Supernatural Power with Rolland Baker. Destiny Image Incorporated (2017) ISBN 978-0-76-841237-6
