= Henry Walker =

Henry Walker may refer to:

- Henry Walker (basketball) (born 1987), American basketball player previously known as Bill Walker
- Henry Walker (cricketer) (1807–1872), English cricketer
- Henry Harrison Walker (1832–1912), Confederate States Army brigadier general during the American Civil War
- Sir Henry Walker (mines inspector) (1873–1954), English Chief Inspector of Mines
- Henry Oliver Walker (1843–1929), American artist
- Henry Joseph Walker (1849–1918), Canadian politician and merchant
- Henry Alexander Walker (1874–1953), British Army officer
- Henry Walker (rugby union) (born 1998), English rugby union player
- Henry N. Walker (1811–1886), Michigan politician
- Henry de Rosenbach Walker (1867–1923), British Liberal Party politician and author
- Henry Walker Eltin, former Australian engineering and construction company

== See also ==
- Harry Walker (disambiguation)
