= Samuel Henry Baker =

English painter

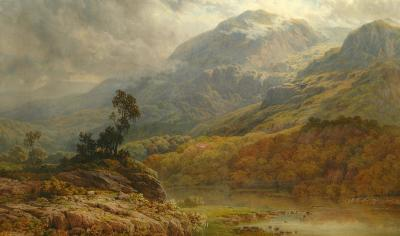
Borrowdale

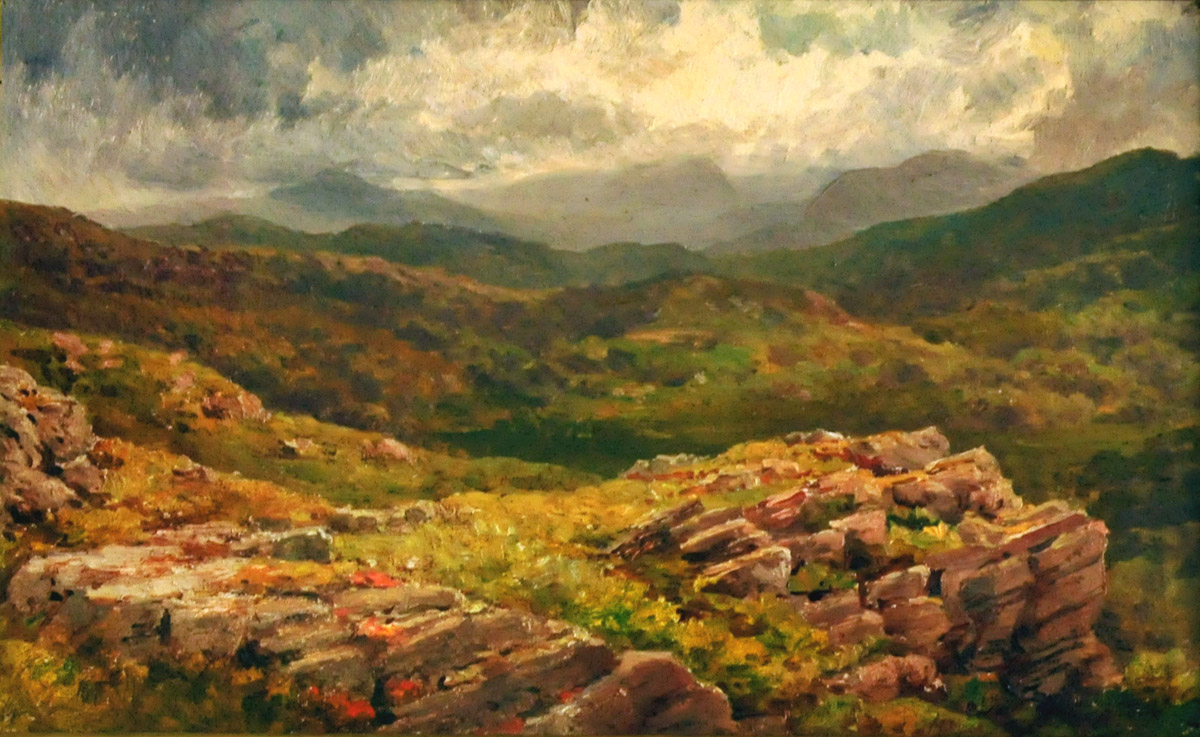
Llanbedr, Snowdonia

Samuel Henry Baker (1824–1909) was an English landscape artist. He was a member of the Royal Birmingham Society of Artists (RBSA) and the Royal Society of Painter-Etchers and Engravers (RE). He painted rural landscape scenes in watercolour.

Samuel Henry Baker was born in Birmingham, the son of Thomas Baker who was a manager at Matthew Boulton's Soho Works. He was apprenticed to James Chaplin, a magic lantern-slide painter and trained at the Birmingham School of Design. He also took lessons from the landscape painter, Joseph Paul Pettitt who had been a pupil of Joseph Vincent Barber. It was possibly through Pettit that Baker inherited the distinctive drawing style of the Birmingham School with its clear outlines and bold cross hatching. He exhibited over five hundred paintings at the RBSA from 1848 to 1909 and was elected a member in 1868.

His older son Oliver (1856–1939) was also an artist and a designer of note, while his younger son Harold (1860-1942) was a noted photographer.
