= Harold H. Dunwoody =

United States Army brigadier general

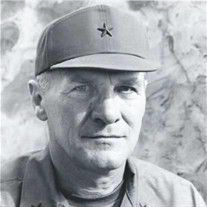
- Born: January 9, 1919; Paris, France
- Died: September 16, 2015 (aged 96); Englewood, Florida, U.S.
- Military career
- Allegiance: United States
- Branch: United States Army
- Service years: 1943–1973
- Rank: Brigadier general
- Commands: 1st Brigade, 5th Infantry Division
- Conflicts: World War II; Korean War; Vietnam War
- Awards: Distinguished Service Cross; Army Distinguished Service Medal (2); Silver Star; Legion of Merit (2); Bronze Star Medal (2); Purple Heart

Harold Halsey Dunwoody (9 January 1919 – 16 September 2015) was a United States Army brigadier general who served as the commanding officer of the 1st Brigade, 5th Infantry Division in the Vietnam War. He was awarded the Distinguished Service Cross, the U.S. Army's second-highest decoration for valor for his valorous actions in the Korean War. He commanded troops in World War II, the Korean War, and the Vietnam War, enabling him to be one of the very small number who ever was entitled to wear the Combat Infantryman Badge with two Stars, denoting active combat in three wars. He was also father of the first female four-star general, Ann E. Dunwoody.

== Early life ==
Harold Halsey Dunwoody was born on January 9, 1919, in Paris, France. His parents were Halsey Dunwoody, a West Point class of 1905 graduate and Silver Star recipients of the World War I, and Doris Dunwoody (née Slater). They met and later married while serving in Paris. The couple had two sisters, Elizabeth and Doreen. His grandfather was Henry Harrison Chase Dunwoody, a West Point class of 1866 graduate and retired as a brigadier general.

== Military career ==
In June 1939, he entered the U.S. Military Academy, West Point, New York, graduating in June 1943 with a Bachelor of Science degree in military engineering and commissioned a second lieutenant. During his time at the academy, he was sent to Fort Knox, Kentucky and later underwent combat training at Fort Chaffee, Arkansas, before sending to Europe and served as a platoon leader in the 47th Tank Battalion, 14th Armored Division.

During the World War II, he was sent to Europe within the 1st Armored Division, in the Western Europe campaign. After he was wounded in the leg during the Battle of the Bulge, he was able to escape from a disabled German tank on the Siegfried Line, in the region of Alsace-Lorraine, on the French-German border.

After the war, he was promoted to major, and a temporary rank of lieutenant colonel in September 1949 before reverting to the rank of major. He took part in the Korean War and served here for eighth months. From August to September 1951, he commanded the 3rd Battalion, 17th Infantry Regiment, 7th Infantry Division. He led his troops captured Hill 820 and Hill 851 near Chupari, but later surrounded after he and his men held off repeated attacks by Chinese troops for two days. For his actions, he was awarded the Distinguished Service Cross.

Dunwoody's Distinguished Service Cross citation reads:

The President of the United States of America, under the provisions of the Act of Congress approved July 9, 1918, takes pleasure in presenting the Distinguished Service Cross to Major (Armor) Harold Halsey Dunwoody, United States Army, for extraordinary heroism in connection with military operations against an armed enemy of the United Nations while serving as Commanding Officer of the 3d Battalion, 17th Infantry Regiment, 7th Infantry Division. Major Dunwoody distinguished himself by extraordinary heroism in action against enemy aggressor forces in the vicinity of Chupari, Korea, during the period 31 August 1951 through 3 September 1951. During this period the 3d Battalion of the 17th Infantry Regiment under the command of Colonel Dunwoody seized enemy-held Hills 820 and 851, key objectives of the 7th Infantry Division, against repeated enemy attacks. Early in the morning of 2 September 1951, Hill 851 was subjected to unusually heavy artillery fire followed by an intense enemy attack. Elements of the 3d Battalion defending Hill 851 gallantly resisted the attack but were forced to move to the rear to reform. Realizing that communication facilities were seriously disrupted and that the enemy had taken a heavy toll, Colonel Dunwoody personally reorganized and encouraged the battalion, frequently exposing himself to hazardous enemy fire in traveling from place to place. To maintain maximum observation and coordination with all elements of his battalion, he established himself in a forward exposed position on Hill 820 and remained there to direct his troops despite numerous fanatical charges by heavily outnumbering enemy forces. On one occasion, attacking enemy troops advanced to fifteen yards of Colonel Dunwoody's observation post, threatening to overrun the forward defenders of Hill 820. Displaying superior intrepidity and coolness under fire, he personally participated in repulsing the attack with grenades and rifle fire, inflicting heavy losses to the enemy, while continuing to direct his men with exceptional insight and military skill.

In 1957 he was appointed an operations and training officer at Headquarters, 7th Army, Stuttgart, Germany. He was promoted to colonel in 1960. One year later, he graduated the National War College. From 1961 to 1964, he served as a senior officer in the Department of the Army and later served as Chairman of the Joint Chief of Staff Study Group, from 1964 to 1967. He was promoted to brigadier general in 1967 and served as a senior officer in the Supreme Allied Commander, Europe and United States European Command from 1968 to 1970.

From May to July 1971, he participated in the Vietnam War, as commanding general, 1st Brigade, 5th Infantry Division of the XXIV Corps at the Quảng Trị province, which withdrew from Vietnam in August 1971 and returned to Fort Carson, Colorado. He retired in 1973, with the rank of brigadier general.

== Later life and death ==
In 1946 he married Elizabeth Hoshier Dunwoody (1924–2006), a graduate of Cornell University with a bachelor's degree in home economics. They had four daughters and two sons: Susan, Anne, Jacqueline, Katherine (d. 1957), Harold, William. The eldest daughter, Susan (née Schoeck), became the third woman to become an Army helicopter pilot; her husband, James, was an Air Force colonel; their daughter, Jennifer, became a fighter pilot and flew missions to Afghanistan. Son: Harold Dunwoody Jr., West Point graduate (1970), first lieutenant. Daughter: Ann Dunwoody - general, the first woman in US military history to achieve the rank of four-star general.

He died on September 6, 2015, at the age of 96 in Englewood, Florida. He was buried with full military honors at St. Patrick's Cemetery in Randolph, next to his wife. He was honored in the United States Congress.

== Awards and decorations ==
Combat Infantryman Badge, third award
Army Staff Identification Badge
Distinguished Service Cross
Army Distinguished Service Medal with bronze oak leaf cluster
Silver Star
Legion of Merit with one bronze oak leaf cluster
Distinguished Flying Cross
Bronze Star Medal with one leaf clusters
Air Medal, device unknown
Army Commendation Medal, with two oak leaf clusters
Purple Heart, with one oak leaf cluster
Army Presidential Unit Citation
American Campaign Medal
European-African-Middle Eastern Campaign Medal, with three service stars
World War II Victory Medal
Army of Occupation Medal
National Defense Service Medal with service star
Korean Service Medal with three bronze service star
Vietnam Service Medal with three service stars
Vietnam Gallantry Cross with palm and gold star
Vietnam Armed Forces Honor Medal, First Class
Korean Presidential Unit Citation
Vietnam Gallantry Cross Unit Citation
United Nations Korea Medal
Vietnam Campaign Medal
Korean War Service Medal
