= Darold =

Male given name

Darold (/ˈdæroʊld/ DARR-ohld) and Derald are masculine given names. Notable people with these names include:

== Darold ==
- Darold Ferguson (born 1988), rapper better known as ASAP Ferg
- Darold Jenkins (1919–1986), American football player
- Darold Knowles (born 1941), Major League Baseball pitcher from 1965 to 1980
- Darold Treffert (1933–2020), Wisconsin psychiatrist who studied Savant Syndrome
- Darold Williamson (born 1983), American track athlete and Olympian

== Derald ==
- Derald Langham (1913–1991), American agricultural geneticist, sesame researcher, and founder of the Genesa Foundation
- Derald Wing Sue, professor of psychology at Columbia University
- Derrie Nelson (born 1958), American football player
- Derald Ruttenberg (1916–2004), American lawyer

== See also ==
- Darryl
- Darrel
