= Hal Tarala =

Canadian ice hockey player

- Born: November 14, 1927 Laird, Saskatchewan, Canada
- Died: June 10, 1995 (aged 67) Portland, OR, USA
- Height: 5 ft 10 in (178 cm)
- Weight: 188 lb (85 kg; 13 st 6 lb)
- Position: Defense
- Shot: Left
- Played for: Penticton Vees
- National team: Canada
- Playing career: 1945–1960
Medal record
Men's ice hockey
Gold medal – first place	1955 West Germany	Ice hockey

Harold Clarence Tarala (November 14, 1927 – June 10, 1995) was a Canadian ice hockey player with the Penticton Vees. He won a gold medal at the 1955 World Ice Hockey Championships in West Germany. He also played professionally for the Kansas City Pla-Mors, Portland Penguins, Kansas City Mohawks, Portland Eagles, Vancouver Canucks, Syracuse Warriors, Springfield Indians, and New Westminster Royals.
