= Harold Walker (footballer) =

Australian rules footballer

Personal information
- Full name: Harold Parkes Learmonth Walker
- Born: 20 August 1895; Ballarat, Victoria
- Died: 21 July 1935 (aged 39); Richmond, Victoria
- Height: 175 cm (5 ft 9 in)
- Weight: 65 kg (143 lb)

Playing career^{1}
Years	Club	Games (Goals)
1916	Fitzroy	1 (0)
- ^{1} Playing statistics correct to the end of 1916.

Harold Parkes Learmonth Walker (20 August 1895 – 21 July 1935) was an Australian rules footballer who played with Fitzroy in the Victorian Football League (VFL).
