= Haraldur Vignir Sveinbjörnsson =

Icelandic composer and arranger

Haraldur Vignir Sveinbjörnsson (born 1975) is an Icelandic composer and arranger.

== Education ==
He studied piano with Árni Harðarson at the Kopavogur Music School where he graduated in 1997. He finished his BA degree in composition at Reykjavik Music College 2001 with Hilmar Þórðarson, and MMus degree in composition at Lund University (Malmö Music University) where he studied with Kent Olofsson and Prof. Luca Francesconi. Haraldur also studied recording technique and Electroacoustic music through various courses in Iceland and Sweden.

== Compositions ==
His orchestra piece, Seven Songs of the Insomniac (Icelandic: Sjö byltur svefnleysingjans), won the Morgondagens tonsättare (English: Tomorrow's composer) prize in Helsingborg, Sweden 2003. A year later, Helsingborg Symphony Orchestra premiered two pieces by Haraldur, 7 Songs of the Insomniac in February, and Hraun in May. 7 Songs of the Insomniac was also nominated as best contemporary music at the Icelandic Music Awards 2005. Other notable pieces include Memento Mei (2005) for mixed choir Piece & Harmony (2001) for string orchestra Duel (2003) for solo contrabass and electronics Dawn (2007) for percussion duo Hodie (2009) for women's choir Forget-me-not (2016) for flute, violin and piano Painting (2016) for harp & percussion & Dots, commas, lines (2019) for wind octet.

His pieces have been performed all over Europe, in the US and Australia.

Along with classical compositions, Haraldur has been playing with various rock and pop groups, including Dead Sea Apple, Red Barnett and Menn Ársins. Hit songs include "Sick of Excuses" (Dead Sea Apple 1996), "A Yeah Yeah Love Song" (Dead Sea Apple 1997), "Dear God" (Dead Sea Apple 2003), "Bearer of Bad News" (Dead Sea Apple 2006), "Þakklæti" (Buff 2008), "12 Steps to the Liquor Store" (Menn Ársins 2008), "Gefst ekki upp" (Eurovision song contest preliminary contest - Menn Ársins 2010) and "Life Support" (Red Barnett 2015).

In 2010, he produced and arranged Regína Ósk's Christmas album "Regína Ósk um gleðileg jól".

Haraldur also did orchestral arrangements for sold-out concerts in Iceland including Pink Floyd's The Wall with Dúndurfréttir and Iceland Symphony Orchestra, Lennon tribute concert in Dec 2006 & Sgt.Peppers Orchestral Tribute concert in 2008, Páll Óskar & Iceland Symphony Orchestra 2011, Skálmöld & Iceland Symphony Orchestra's award-winning Metal Symphony concert in 2013 & 2018 and Týr & symphonic orchestra of the Faroe Islands in Feb 2020.
