= Hal Baron =

American historian (1930–2017)

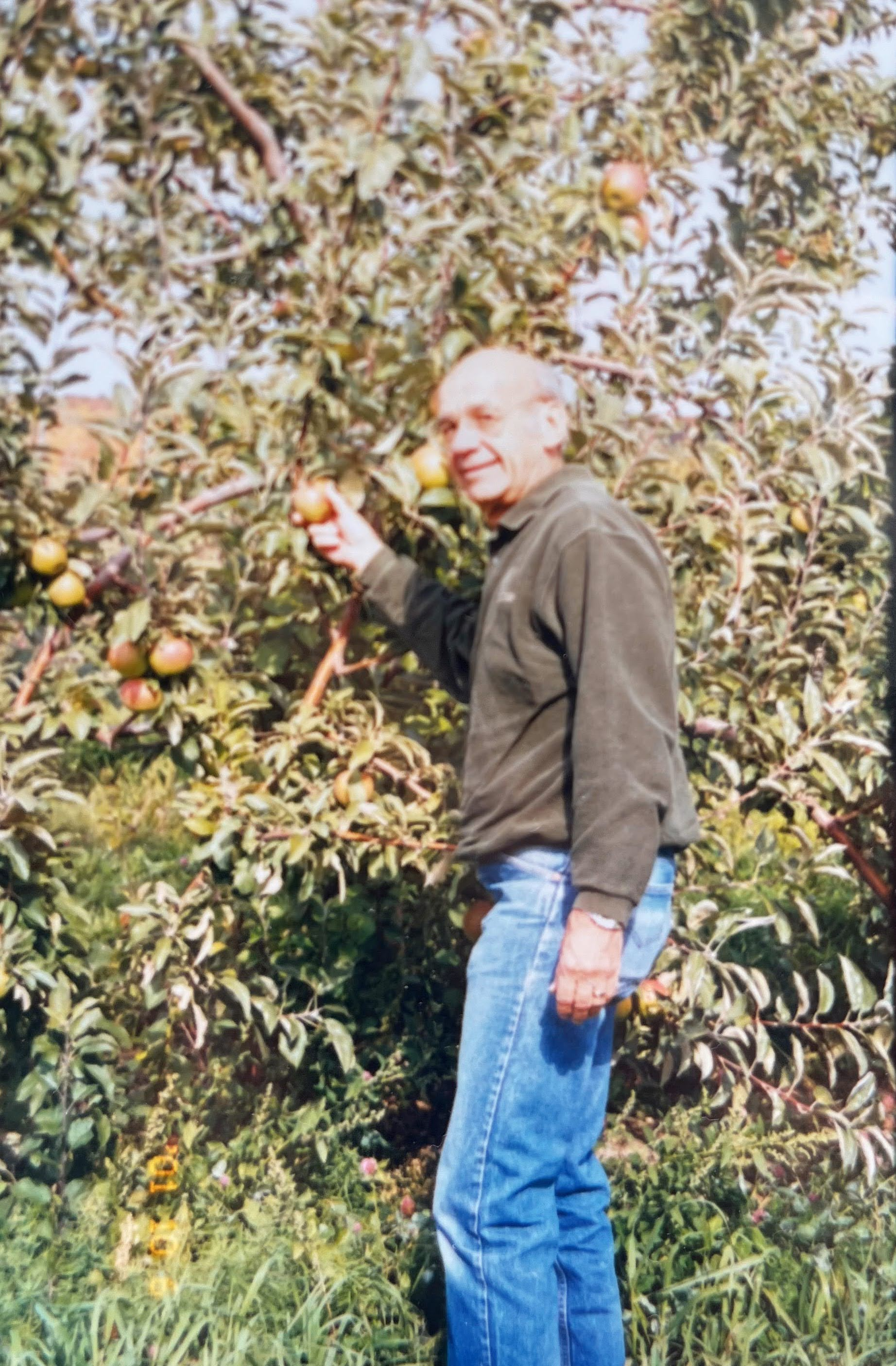
Hal Baron circa 2002

Harold Maurice Baron (June 4, 1930 – January 18, 2017) was an American economic historian, activist, and policymaker who worked behind-the-scenes to assist disenfranchised communities in inner-city Chicago and later, base communities in El Salvador. Baron's five-pronged approach focused on history, employment, education, housing, and politics, which he saw as interrelated forces of systemic racism. As director of research at the Chicago Urban League, Baron developed groundbreaking reports and essays on these themes, demonstrating continued, intentional racial segregation in northern cities such as Chicago. In this capacity, he provided research and statistics to Dr. Martin Luther King Jr. during the Chicago Freedom Movement and orchestrated the landmark Gautreaux v. Chicago Housing Authority case that became Hills v. Gautreaux and resulted in the Gautreaux Project. In the 1980s, Baron served as chief policymaker to Mayor Harold Washington, where he focused on education reform. He also contributed to the campaigns of Democratic politicians such as Lane Evans, Paul Wellstone, and Jesús "Chuy" García. Later in life, Baron worked alongside Jeff Haas, co-founder of the People's Law Office, in Chicago, and anti-globalization theorist Naomi Klein, as chair of the board of directors to EcoViva.

== Biography ==
Hal Baron was born in Saint Louis, Missouri. He attended Amherst College in 1948. He attended the University of Chicago for his PhD. In 1953, he married Paula (Levin) Baron (1934-2026) and had three children; Mark, Marnie, and Edward.

Hal Baron directed the Chicago Urban League from 1961 to 1968; during that time he was a strategic political advisor to civil rights leaders during the Chicago Freedom Movement including Dr. Martin Luther King Jr.

He advised the Harold Washington campaign from the early 1980s to 1987, working with Harold Washington's mayoral campaign and during Washington's mayoralty as chief policy advisor.
