= Harald Servus =

Austrian politician (born 1965)

Member of the National Council
- Incumbent
- Assumed office 24 October 2024
- Constituency: Lower Austria

Personal details
- Born: 13 June 1965 (age 60)
- Party: People's Party

Harald Servus (born 13 June 1965) is an Austrian politician of the People's Party serving as a member of the National Council since 2024. He has served as director of Wirtschaftsbund Niederösterreich since 2012.
