= Ruth Haroldson =

American conductor and violinist (died 1982)

- Died: September 5, 1982 (aged 43)
- Employer(s): Whittier College; Whittier College Community Orchestra; The Los Angeles Women's Symphony

Ruth Haroldson (died September 5, 1982) was an American conductor, violinist and educator. She worked at the Whittier College Music Department and was the founder and conductor of the Whittier College Community Orchestra.

== Career ==
Haroldson was a student of Jacques Gordon and graduated with a Bachelor of Music in 1927.

Haroldson worked as Professor of Violin at the Whittier College Music Department and founded the Whittier College Community Orchestra in Whittier, California in 1932. She toured the west coast in 1932, rendering two Bach compositions. Haroldson resigned as conductor of the Whittier College Community Orchestra in 1966. Her students at Whittier included Wayne Reinecke, who founded the Pasadena Community Orchestra.

Haroldson also conducted The Los Angeles Women's Symphony in the 1950s, the oldest women's symphony in the United States, succeeding Vernon Robinson. She also wrote articles about the educational benefits of all women orchestras. She conducted the he Los Angeles Women's Symphony until 1961.

Haroldson died on September 5, 1982. After her death, the Rio Hondo Symphony dedicated their golden jubilee concert on October 2, 1982, to Haroldson's memory. She was described as "dynamic and forceful in personality."
