= Harold Zent =

American politician

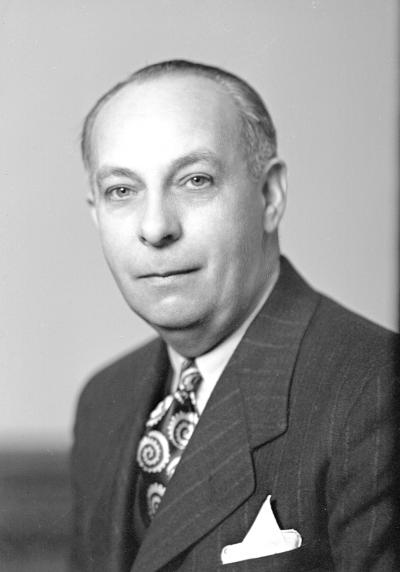
- Zent in 1951

Member of the Washington House of Representatives for the 6th district
- In office 1941–1951

Personal details
- Born: 1900 Ritzville, Washington, United States
- Died: August 24, 1951 Spokane, Washington, United States
- Party: Republican

Harold W. Zent (1900 – August 24, 1951) was an American politician in the state of Washington. He served in the Washington House of Representatives from 1941 to his death in 1951 for district 6.
