= Harold (surname) =

Harold is an English personal name. The modern name Harold and Harrod may have derived from the Old Danish name Harald, the Old German names Hairold or Herold, or the Old English name Hereweald. The Irish derivative is Ó hArailt.

== People with the surname ==
- Dave Harold, (born 1966), English professional snooker player
- Edgar von Harold (1830–1886), German entomologist
- Emily Harold, (1820–1872) American woman
- Erika Harold, (born 1980), Miss America (2003)
- Gale Harold, (born 1969), American actor
- John Harold (1873–1947), Canadian politician
- Ruth Haroldson (died 1982), American conductor and violinist

See also Harrold (surname)
