= Hal Bunderson =

American politician (born 1936)

Member of the Idaho Senate from the 14th district
- In office April 19, 1993 – December 1, 2006
- Preceded by: Herb Carlson
- Succeeded by: Stan Bastian

Personal details
- Born: September 21, 1936 (age 89) Stone, Idaho
- Party: Republican

Hal Bunderson (born September 21, 1936) is an American politician who served in the Idaho Senate from the 14th district from 1993 to 2006.
