= Hal Yinger =

American college football and track and field coach and professor (1919–2000)

Biographical details
- Born: March 19, 1919; Jackson, Ohio, U.S.
- Died: February 16, 2000 (aged 80); Warrensburg, Missouri, U.S.

Playing career

Football
- 1937–1938: Rio Grande
- 1939–1940: Eastern Kentucky State
- 1941–1943: USAAF (Kearns, Utah)
- 1946: Eastern Kentucky State
- Positions: Center, linebacker

Coaching career (HC unless noted)

Football
- 1950–1951: Central Missouri State (assistant)
- 1952: Tarkio
- 1953–1956: Central Missouri State (assistant)
- 1957–1960: Central Missouri State

Track and field
- 1953–1957: Central Missouri State

Head coaching record
- Overall: 11–32–2 (football)

Accomplishments and honors

Awards
- Football; All-Ohio (1938); All-Rockies and All-Utah service team (1943); All-KIAC (1946)

Harold L. Yinger (March 19, 1919 – February 16, 2000) was an American football and track and field coach, athletics administrator, and professor.

== Early life, playing career, and military service ==
Yinger was a multi-sport athlete at Jackson High School in Jackson, Ohio before graduating in 1937. At Rio Grande College—now known as the University of Rio Grande—he played football, basketball, and baseball, and was named the football team captain and All-Ohio as a center in 1938.

Yinger enrolled at Eastern Kentucky State Teachers College—now known as Eastern Kentucky University—in 1939, and played football and baseball for two seasons before joining the United States Army during World War II. He served from 1941 to 1946, spending most of that period at Camp Kearns, in Kearns, Utah. There he was a physical training officer, and played on the base football and basketball teams. In 1943, he was named to the All-Rocky Mountain and All-Service football teams as a center. He was the only officer on the base team. Yinger returned to Eastern Kentucky State College in 1946, and received All-Kentucky Intercollegiate Athletic Conference (KIAC) honors as a center.

== Coaching career ==
Yinger enrolled at Central Missouri State College—now known as University of Central Missouri—in 1950 to pursue a master's degree while working as a graduate assistant in the physical education department and with the football and track and field teams. The next year, he was hired as the football team's line coach, reuniting former school mate, Harry Fritz, who was hired as head football coach in 1952.

In 1952, Yinger left Central Missouri State to become the head football coach at Tarkio College in Tarkio, Missouri. After a year at Tarkio, he returned to Central Missouri State as the football line coach and head track and field coach. He served in that position from 1953 to 1957. During that period, his track teams won the Missouri Intercollegiate Athletic Association (MIAA) indoor championships in 1953 and 1954 and the outdoor championships in 1954 and 1955. Yinger was promoted to head football coach in 1957 and served in that capacity for four years. He was the appointed director of the school's intramural program in 1961 and the next year as athletic director. In 1962, he was promoted to full professor and became the chairman of the division of Health, Physical Education and Recreation. He retired in that capacity in 1977 to resume teaching full time and from the school in September 1984.

== Death and family ==
Yinger died on February 16, 2000, at Ridgecrest Nursing Care Center in Warrensburg, Missouri. He was married to Virginia Long, and they had one son, Andrew L.

== Honors ==
Professional honors: "Who's Who in American Education 1965; The Centennial Award For Excellence In Teaching from Eastern Kentucky University, 1974; named to the Rio Grande College Athletic Hall of Fame in 1975 for football; and awarded the Rio Grande College Outstanding Achievement Award in 1980.

== Head coaching record ==
Year	Team	Overall	Conference	Standing	Bowl/playoffs
Tarkio Owls (Central Church College Conference / Missouri College Athletic Union) (1952)
1952	Tarkio	1–7	1–2 / 0–4	3rd / 5th	
Tarkio:		1–7	1–6		
Central Missouri State Mules (Missouri Intercollegiate Athletic Association) (1957–1960)
1957	Central Missouri State	1–7–1	1–3–1	5th	
1958	Central Missouri State	2–6–1	1–4	5th	
1959	Central Missouri State	3–7	1–4	T–5th	
1960	Central Missouri State	4–5	1–4	5th	
Central Missouri State:		10–25–2	4–15–1		
Total:		11–32–2			
