= Hal Jarrett =

South African cricketer (1907–1983)

Harold Harvey ("Hal") Jarrett (23 September 1907 – 17 March 1983) was a South African cricketer active from 1932 to 1938 who played for Warwickshire and Glamorgan. He was born in Johannesburg and died in Pontypool. He appeared in fifteen first-class matches as a righthanded batsman who bowled leg break and googly. He scored 228 runs with a highest score of 45 and took 51 wickets with a best performance of eight for 187.
