= Henry Brooks Baker =

American public health pioneer

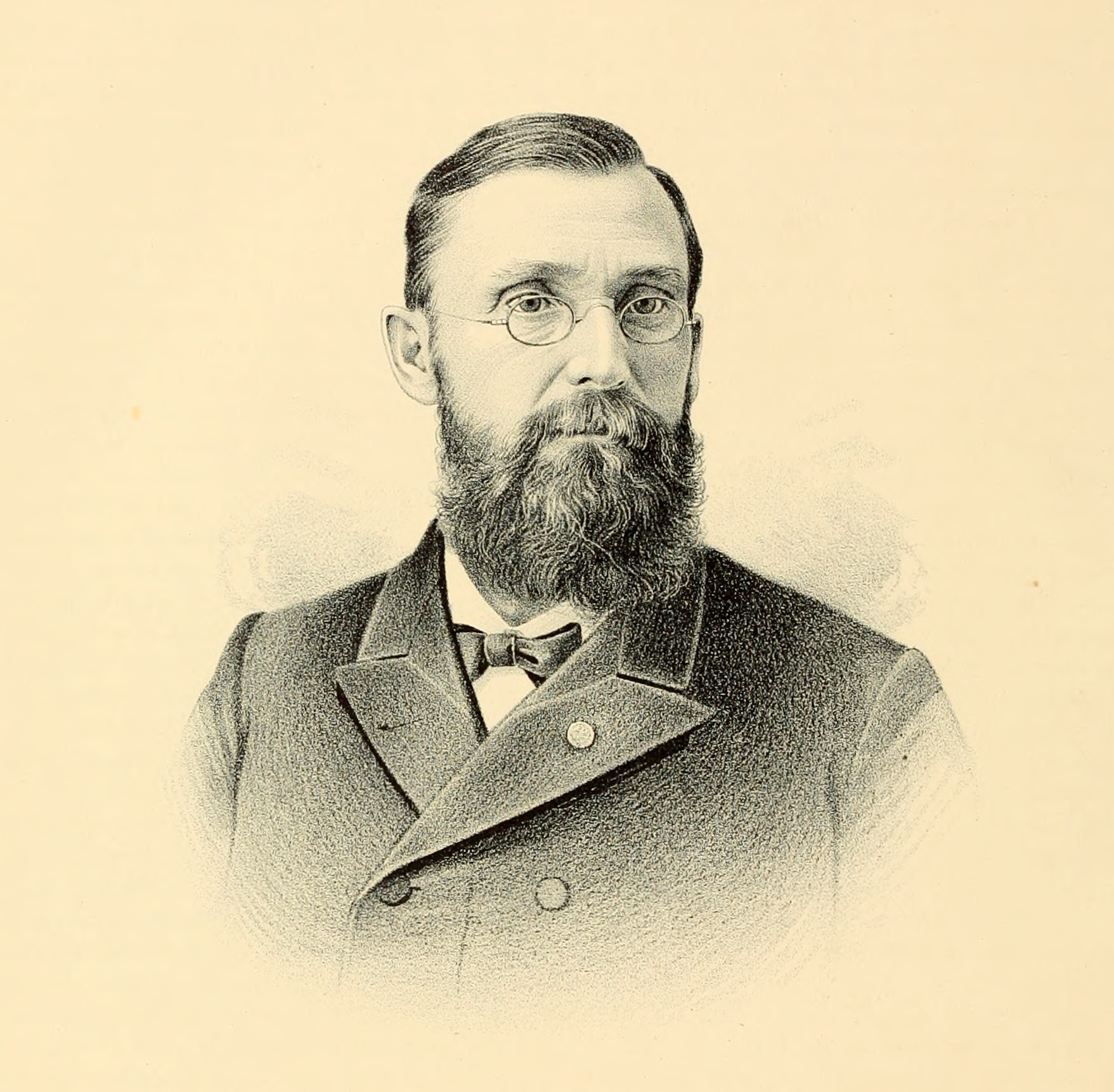
- Born: December 29, 1837; Brattleboro
- Died: April 4, 1920 (aged 82); Ypsilanti
- Occupation: Medical doctor, writer, environmental health officer

Henry Brooks Baker (December 29, 1837 – April 4, 1920) was an American public health pioneer.

Henry Brooks Baker was born on December 29, 1837 in Brattleboro, Vermont. He received a common-school education, and studied medicine at the University of Michigan in 1861–1862. He served through the American Civil War with the 20th Michigan Infantry, and from July 1864, was its assistant surgeon. He was graduated at Bellevue Hospital Medical College in 1866, and then began to practice in Lansing, Michigan, where he later performed important operations. In 1870 he took charge of the vital statistics of Michigan, and in 1873 he became secretary of the Michigan State Board of Health. In his official capacity he has edited and published Statistics of Michigan (Lansing, 1870), Vital Statistics of Michigan, registration reports (1870-1876), and the Reports of the State Board of Health (1872–1885). His own papers, which were quite numerous, principally on sanitary subjects, have appeared in various medical journals, chiefly those of Detroit. Baker devoted much time to studies relative to the causation of diphtheria, typhoid fever, cholera, and pneumonia. The results thus far obtained appeared in the Transactions of the American Public Health Association and Transactions of the American Climatological Association, 1886. He was a member of the American Climatological Association, the Royal Meteorological Society of England, and the French Society of Hygiene.

Henry Brooks Baker died on 4 April 1920 in Ypsilanti, Michigan.
