= Sid Harrold =

English footballer

Personal information
- Full name: Sidney Harrold
- Date of birth: 5 September 1895
- Place of birth: Stourbridge, England
- Position: Winger

Senior career*
| Years | Team | Apps | (Gls) |
| 1913–1914 | Willenhall Swifts | | |
| 1914–1915 | Stourbridge | | |
| 1918–1919 | Wednesbury | | |
| 1919–1920 | Leicester City | 18 | (2) |
| 1920–1922 | Nottingham Forest | 50 | (8) |
| 1922–1923 | Accrington Stanley | 6 | (1) |
| Total | | 74 | (11) |
- * Club domestic league appearances and goals

Sidney Harrold (5 September 1895–unknown) was an English footballer who played in the Football League for Accrington Stanley, Leicester City and Nottingham Forest.
