= Haroldo Christofani =

Brazilian footballer

Haroldo
Personal information
- Full name: Haroldo Christofani
- Date of birth: 7 September 1933
- Place of birth: São Paulo, Brazil
- Date of death: 23 April 2020 (aged 86)
- Place of death: São Paulo, Brazil
- Position: Right winger

Youth career
- –1953: São Paulo

Senior career*
Years	Team	Apps	(Gls)
1953–1955	São Paulo	50	(12)
1955–1956	São Bento		
1957	Juventus-SP		
1958	Nacional-SP		
1959	Esportiva		
- * Club domestic league appearances and goals as of 10 November 2023

Haroldo Christofani (7 September 1933 – 23 April 2020), known mononymously as Haroldo, was a Brazilian professional footballer who played as a right winger.

== Career ==
Revealed in the youth categories of São Paulo FC, he was part of the main team from 1953 to 1955, becoming state champion. He scored a historic goal against Corinthians, 3 July 1954. Also played for other clubs in the state of São Paulo until retiring in the early 60s.

== Honours ==
São Paulo

- Campeonato Paulista: 1953

== Death ==
Haroldo died in São Paulo, 23 April 2020, victim of complications from Alzheimer's disease.
