= Harold Traynor =

Australian rules footballer

Personal information
- Full name: Harold Traynor
- Born: 4 December 1922
- Died: 14 March 1983 (aged 60)
- Height: 173 cm (5 ft 8 in)
- Weight: 73 kg (161 lb)

Playing career^{1}
Years	Club	Games (Goals)
1939–42	South Melbourne	37 (16)
- ^{1} Playing statistics correct to the end of 1942.

Harold Traynor (4 December 1922 – 14 March 1983) was an Australian rules footballer who played with South Melbourne in the Victorian Football League (VFL).
