= Jean Ven Robert Hal =

Italian electronic musician (born 1970)

- Born: 11 May 1970 (age 56)
- Origin: Milan, Italy
- Genres: Kosmische Musik, space, electronic, instrumental, krautrock, new-age, ambient, classical, synthpop
- Occupations: Composer, musician, artist, producer, synthesist
- Instruments: Synthesizer, piano, organ, keyboards, Hammond organ, sequencer, drums, drum machine, percussion, sampler, vocoder, theremin
- Years active: 1994–present
- Label: Independent
- Website: www.jeanvenroberthal.com

Jean Ven Robert Hal (born 11 May 1970), known as his stage name Roberto D'Agostino Vendola, is an Italian musician and composer of krautrock, progressive rock, ambient, jazz, synthpop, electronic, space and orchestral music.

== Biography ==
As a graduate of geometry, Hal also studied architecture and design. His first exposure to music was when he was given his first keyboard at the age of six. He then later started to compose music. Hal specializes on both the analog sound and digital electronic devices and the use of "vintage" synths with prestigious brands such as Moog, ARP Instruments Inc., EMS (Electronic Music Studios), Elka, Oberheim, Synclavier, Fairlight CMI, Mellotron, a precursor of today's samplers, the legendary Theremin and many others, all musical instruments that have marked the history of modern music.

Jean Ven Robert Hal is one of the few representatives in Italy and belongs to the current musical wave of the Kosmische Musik genre with many "cultural" pieces. Kosmische Musik (or krautrock) originated in Germany from various musical influences that are substantially known as the "minimalism". The psychedelic music and cultured electronic music is a consequence of post-weberian style. Currently, Kosmische Musik is filed under the genres of "ambient" and generically (even if improperly), as "new-age". Many of his musical works have been transmitted on television. Hal is an expert researcher and creator of analogical and digital sound.

== Works ==
His most representative work is titled Cosmic Nature, which is a journey through space, in the nature of the universe, but implicitly also of its internal state, characterized by broad melodies, sounds and "cosmic" wrap. Among the most important pieces are also the composition of a symphony of the same name that is representative of the Overture Album. Other tracks worth mentioning that have enjoyed success on TV and once again are returning to the web are:

- Hopes and Dreams, a symphonic atmosphere completely reminiscent of classical, acoustic sounds in which Hal is able to give color to the synthesizer.
- Laser Hal 1 (part 1), is a song electronic-cosmic interpretation imposing and dramatic, which represents the beginning of an inner journey through time. It develops in one part rhythm, frantic and for a second more symphonic but still accompanied by full electronic effects with the use of the Theremin, and Mellotron choirs legendary mythical "M400" in addition to other vintage synths.
- Laser Hal 2 (Part. 2), one of the classic songs cosmic-based sequencing, interlocking chains of harmonie and complex. It is a journey in stages of the inner life sometimes with reversals in the face, but always accompanied by a "common thread".
- Moon Voice, a song that develops in a more rhythmic and techno-dance. It is a song entirely dedicated to the first "Moon Landing" in 1969, Apollo 11, where you can listen to the voices of the Astronauts Neil Armstrong, Buzz Aldrin and Michael Collins, processed electronically.

Jean Ven Robert Hal, fascinated by the world of 3D computer graphics for over ten years, has done some studies and improvements in this area. He is currently producing a multimedia project with 3D visual and musical experimentation that will be published in a DVD (in 2011). Hal also has approached to compose music for films, music for short films, free compositions, electronic symphonies, television themes.

== Other collaborations ==
Hal has actively collaborated with the Italian conductors and Italian maestro/professor and European synthesist "Gian Felice Fugazza" of the electronic music divisions of the Conservatory of Bologna (Italy), as well as one of the first and extensive experts of electronic instruments and synthesizers. Hal has worked and collaborated with advertising jingles, musical interludes with various musicians in many productions, including "MTV Music", and followed the arrangements for the music of some TV networks. Hal has also collaborated with musicians and the conductor of the symphonic orchestra and for choir, among those "Adriano Bassi" in 1997– 98 for a series of concerts:

- Imperial "Nelson Mass” (Missa in Angustiis – 1798) of Joseph Haydn
- "Missa" di José J. E. Lobo de Mesquita
- Various Compositions of Heitor Villa-Lobos

He sang as a tenor in the famous "Coro Hispano Americano" Choir in Milan at the Institute Cervantes from 1996 to 1999 founded by the great Conductor of choir "Marco Dusi", and from this work blossomed about fifty concerts.

== Listen online works ==
- Hopes and Dreams
- Laser Hal 1 (Part. 1)
- Laser Hal 2 (Part. 2)
- Moon Voice
- Automation
- Equilibrium
