= Hal E. Broxmeyer =

American microbiologist (died 2021)

Hal Broxmeyer

Hal E. Broxmeyer (November 27, 1944 – 8 December 2021) was an American microbiologist. He was a professor at the Mary Margaret Walther Program for Cancer Care Research, and Professor of Microbiology and Immunology at the Indiana University School of Medicine. He received a BS degree from Brooklyn College in 1969 and a PhD from New York University in 1973.

== Life and career ==
Broxmeyer was internationally recognized for his work on human umbilical cord blood as a source of transplantable hematopoietic stem cells. In 1988, he first coordinated a study in successfully demonstrating clinical utility of cord blood transplantation to cure a hematological disorder of a child (Fanconi anemia) working together with Dra. Gluckman. This intervention took place in Hospital Saint-Louis (Paris) and was successful. Work from his laboratory established the field of clinical cord blood transplantation.

He died from thyroid cancer on 8 December 2021, at the age of 77.

== Awards and honors ==
1. Dirk van Bekkum Award (2002)
2. E. Donnall Thomas Prize and Lecture (2006)
3. President, American Society of Hematology (2010)
4. Elected Fellow of American Association for Advancement of Science (2012)
