= H. A. Baker =

American missionary

Harold Armstrong Baker (1881–1971), known as H.A. Baker, was an American author and Pentecostal missionary to Tibet from 1911 to 1919, to China from 1919 to 1950, when forced to leave the mainland, and then in Taiwan from 1955 until his death in 1971.

With his wife and co-worker Josephine, Pastor Baker began the Adullam Rescue Mission for street children in Yunnan Province, China. The children in the home, mostly boys aged from six to eighteen, began to have spiritual experiences, having seen Heaven through a series of visions. These visions were recounted in Baker's book Visions Beyond the Veil.

He was also the author of Heaven and the Angels, Plains of Glory and Gloom, The Three Worlds, Tribulation to Glory, Through Tribulation, Visions Beyond The Veil, and other books. His little known last book, written at the end of his life, was called "My Goodbye Book". This book clearly outlined his personal beliefs including the oneness of God in the Person of Jesus Christ.

H.A. Baker and his wife were the grandparents of Rolland Baker, founder with his wife Heidi Baker of IRIS Ministries in Mozambique.

== Publication list (selection) ==
- Baker, H.A. They Saw Hell. Minneapolis: The Osterhus Publishing House, 1950s.
- Baker, H.A. Visions Beyond The Veil. Minneapolis: Osterhus Publishing House, 1950. 122 pp. ISBN 978-1-85240-278-5
- Baker, H.A. Heaven and the Angels. Minneapolis: The Osterhus Publishing House, 1950s, 262 pp.
- Baker, H.A. Plains of Glory and Gloom. Minneapolis: The Osterhus Publishing House, 1950s.
- Baker, H.A. Heaven and the Angels. New Wine Press, 2009, 160 pp. ISBN 978-1-905991-33-4
- Baker, H.A. The Three Worlds. Minneapolis: The Osterhus Publishing House, 1950s.
- Baker, H.A. Through Tribulation. Minneapolis: Calvary Books And Tracts, 1960s.
- Baker, H.A. God in Ka Do Land. Iris Ministries (original publisher not known, re-published posthumously, 2008, available as a PDF from Iris Ministries web at the bottom of the main page)
- Baker, H.A. Under His Wings (autobiography). Iris Ministries (original publisher not known, re-published posthumously, 2008, available as a PDF from Iris Ministries web at the bottom of the main page)
