= Harold Baker (photographer) =

British photographer (1860–1942)

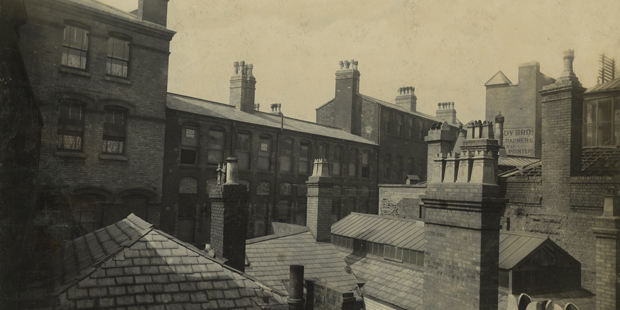
Baker's Cannon Street overlooking roof tops, 1893, depicting Birmingham. From a print in the collection of the Library of Birmingham.

Harold Baker (1860–1942) was a British photographer who was based in Birmingham, England.

== Life and career ==
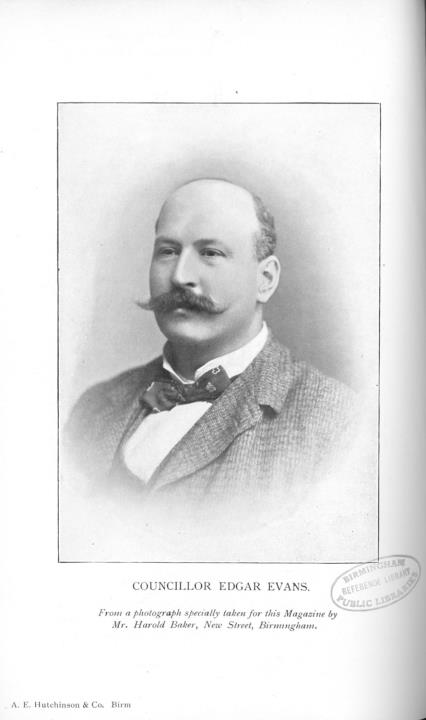
Baker's portrait of Handsworth Urban District Council member and brewery owner Edgar Evans from Handsworth magazine, April 1900

Baker was born in Birmingham in 1860, the son of Samuel Henry Baker, an artist and member of the Royal Birmingham Society of Artists. His brother Oliver (1856–1939) was also an artist and a designer.

He went to King Edward School in New Street, Birmingham, and then apprenticed to a wood-carver of church furniture and designer of stained glass windows.

Baker was a keen amateur photographer and in 1886 opened his first photographic studio at 17 Cannon Street, Birmingham, and the following year moved to premises in New Street. He was appointed official photographer to the Birmingham Archaeological Society, succeeding Robert W. Thrupp.

In about 1897 he became closely associated with the Birmingham Magazine of Arts and Industries, and became the magazine's official photographer. He was a regular contributor to photographic magazines including Practical Photographer.

In 1902, Baker was invited to assist J. Benjamin Stone the official photographer for the coronation of King Edward VII, and is credited with having taken the only photograph of the proclamation of the King at St James's Palace.

In 1921 he judged the first annual photographic exhibition organised by the Soho Hill Men's Movement Camera Club.

A collection of his work including over 200 albumen prints mainly of architectural and archaeological studies of buildings and sites in and around Birmingham c1870-1880 and 500 half-plate glass negatives of architectural and historical subjects is held in the Library of Birmingham.
