= Harold Baker (cricketer) =

English cricketer

Personal information
- Full name: Harold Frank Baker
- Born: 4 May 1884; Walsall, Staffordshire, England
- Died: 5 May 1954 (aged 70); West Hagley, Worcestershire, England
- Batting: Right-handed
- Bowling: Slow left-arm orthodox

Career statistics
Competition	FC
Matches	2
Runs scored	21
Batting average	7.00
100s/50s	0/0
Top score	8*
Balls bowled	138
Wickets	0
Bowling average	-
5 wickets in innings	0
10 wickets in match	0
Best bowling	-
Catches/stumpings	1/0
- Source: CricketArchive, 28 March 2009

Harold Frank Baker (4 May 1884 – 5 May 1954) was an English cricketer who played two first-class games for Worcestershire in 1911. He made his first-class debut in the same match as the slightly more successful James Turner.

Baker scored a total of 23 runs in four innings with the bat, with a top score of 8. He made one catch, to dismiss Gloucestershire player Arthur Nott.

Baker was born in Walsall, then in Staffordshire. He died one day after his 70th birthday in West Hagley, Worcestershire.
