= Isak Elbogen =

Czech rabbi (1812–1883)

Rabbi Isak Elbogen
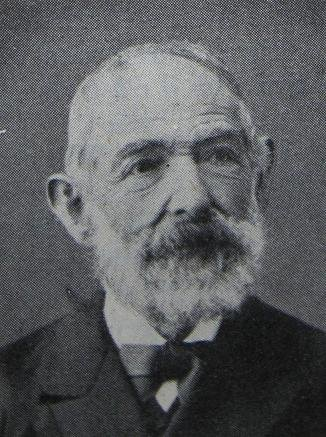

Personal life
- Born: 23 November 1812 Smíchov, Bohemia, Austrian Empire
- Died: 29 August 1883 (aged 70) Vienna, Austria-Hungary
- Buried: Vienna Central Cemetery
- Spouse: Friederike Pokorny
- Children: One son, Guido Elbogen
- Parent(s): Rabbi Josef Elbogen and his wife Ludmilla
- Citizenship: Austro-Hungarian
- Education: Charles-Ferdinand University, Prague

Religious life
- Religion: Judaism

Jewish leader
- Position: Rabbi
- Synagogue: Mladá Boleslav
- Began: 1843
- Ended: 1880
- Semikhah: 1841, from the Prague Beth Din

Isak Elbogen (23 November 1812 – 29 August 1883) was a Czech rabbi. He worked in the synagogue in Smíchov and for almost his entire professional career as a regional rabbi of the Jewish community in Mladá Boleslav (German: Jungbunzlau), then one of the most important in Bohemia.

== Early life and education ==
He was born into the family of Rabbi Josef Elbogen and his wife Ludmilla in Smíchov in Bohemia (now a district of Prague in the Czech Republic). He had two brothers – Jakob and Lazar, and four sisters – Anna, Rosalia, Amalie and Johanna.

He first studied at the local gymnasium, and between 1834 and 1836 completed a three-year degree course at the Charles-Ferdinand University in Prague, graduating in 1841 as Doctor of Philosophy. Around this time he also received semicha (rabbinic ordination) from the beth din in Prague, which was led by Rabbi Samuel Lobe Kauder.

== Career ==
Elbogen first worked in his native Smíchov (until 1922 an independent town with its own Jewish community). In 1843, he left Smíchov to become regional rabbi in Mladá Boleslav where he worked for 37 years, retiring in 1880. He died three years later in Vienna and is buried at the Vienna Central Cemetery.

== Works ==
Elbogen was known an expert on the Talmud and the Mishnah. His book שעשועים בחדרי המשנה מענה חדות ששה סדרי משנה (Šauším behadrej hamišná meanná hidot šišá sidrej mišná) was published in Prague in 1865. He also wrote a selicha commemorating the great fire of the Mladá Boleslav Jewish Quarter and the synagogue on Shabbat, 28 May 1859, entitled סליחות לזכרון האש אשר יצאה בעיר יונגבונצלויא בים שבת קודש ('Penitential prayers to the memory of the terrible fire that engulfed the city of Mladá Boleslav on the holy Sabbath day twenty-fourth Iyar of the year 1859'), which, until its destruction just before the Second World War, was read aloud annually in Mladá Boleslav synagogue.

== Personal and family life ==
He married Friederike Pokorny. They had a son, Guido Elbogen, who went into banking and became President of the Anglo-Austrian Bank in Vienna. Guido's son Heinrich was a sport shooter who represented Austria in the 1912 Summer Olympics. Guido's daughter Jenny Weleminsky was an Esperantist and translator, whose work was published in the Budapest Esperanto-language magazine Literatura Mondo.
