= Bernard Granville Baker =

British soldier and military artist

Bernard Granville Baker (23 October 1870 – 12 March 1957) (known as B. Granville Baker) was a British soldier and painter specialising in military subjects. He wrote and illustrated a number of books.

== Life and work ==
Baker was born in Pune (then called Poona) in India. He was the son of Montagu Bernard Baker, who worked for the British East India Company, and his wife Harriet Fanny Bangh.

He was educated at Winchester College and the Military Academy at Dresden. He served in the 21st (Empress of India's) Hussars in India and Burma. He fought in the Boer Wars in South Africa in 1900. In the First World War, he became a Lieutenant-Colonel and commanded the 13th[battalion] of the Yorkshire Regiment. He was awarded the Distinguished Service Order in 1918.

Baker is known for his illustrations and watercolour paintings of military subjects, such as "Sir John Moore at Corunna, January 16th 1809" in the 1920s. He exhibited his paintings at Liverpool's Walker Art Gallery and the London Salon between 1914 and 1930, as well as in his home town of Beccles in Suffolk.

He wrote and illustrated a number of books. The Danube with Pen and Pencil (1911) has a dedication to "My Right Good Friend and Genial Host Guido Elbogen of Schloss Thalheim, Lower Austria". Guido Elbogen (1845–1918) was the father of Jenny Elbogen who inherited Schloss Thalheim. Jenny, her husband Friedrich Weleminsky and son Anton Weleminsky fled the Nazis in 1939 and came to England under the guarantee of "an English ex-army Colonel" in Beccles who was Bernard Granville Baker. From a Terrace in Prague has the dedication "This book is dedicated to a wise and gentle lady who looks out upon life from a terrace", while A Winter Holiday in Portugal has "This book is dedicated to a lady, fair and gracious who lives in Lisbon".

He was a Justice of the Peace for Suffolk. He was elected a Fellow of the Royal Geographical Society and of the Royal Historical Society.

In 1897 he married Lorina Hartley, daughter of Rev A O Hartley. Lorina, who was also an artist, died in 1942.

Baker died in Beccles in 1957.

== Works ==
- The Walls of Constantinople (2 volumes, 1910)
- The Danube with Pen and Pencil (1911)
- A Winter Holiday in Portugal (1912) (with C. Gasquoine Hartley)
- The Passing of the Turkish Empire in Europe (1913)
- The German Army from within. By a British officer who has served in it (1914) (with Thomas Burke)
- Hutchinson's History of the Nations (1915, including The Sea! The Sea!)
- Types of the Allied Armies (1914–1918) (with "Oilette")
- Soldiers of the World (1914–1918) (with "Oilette")
- From a Terrace in Prague (1923)
- Waveney. Illustrated (1924)
- Blithe Waters: Sheaves out of Suffolk (1931)
- Old Cavalry Stations (1934)
