= Bernard Baker =

Bernard Baker may refer to:

- Bernard Granville Baker (1870–1957), British soldier and painter
- Bernard N. Baker (1854–1918), American shipping magnate
- Bernard S. Baker (1936–2004), American electrochemistry pioneer
- Bernard Baker (musician), musician and music educator at Conservatoire de musique du Québec à Montréal
