= Weleminsky =

Origin
- Language: German
- Region of origin: Czech Republic

Other names
- Variant form: Velemínský/ Velemínská (Czech)

Weleminsky is a German-language surname. Alternative spellings include Welleminsky and Velemínský (the Czech language variant, for which the female equivalent is Velemínská). The name may refer to:

- Friedrich Weleminsky (1868–1945), German-speaking physician and scientist from Prague who, in the early 20th century, created an alternative treatment for tuberculosis, tuberculomucin Weleminsky
- Jenny Weleminsky (née Elbogen; 1882–1957), German-speaking Esperantist and translator from Austria
- Jiří Velemínský (1933–2008), pioneering Czech plant geneticist
