= Sidak (disambiguation) =

Sidak is a village in West Azerbaijan Province of Iran.

Sidak may also refer to:

- Danny Sidak, Bangladeshi movie actor and director
- Sidak Singh (born 1999), Indian cricketer
- Zbyněk Šidák (1933–1999), Czech mathematician

== See also ==
- Šidák correction, a statistical method used to counteract the problem of multiple comparisons
- Šidák correction for t-test
