= Jiří Velemínský =

Czech plant geneticist (1933–2008)

Jiří Velemínský (21 November 1933, in České Budějovice – 23 February 2008, in Prague) was a pioneering Czech plant geneticist. He was a founding member of the Learned Society of the Czech Republic and held many high positions in the Academy of Sciences of the Czech Republic.

== Early life and education ==
Jiří Velemínský was born in České Budějovice on 21 November 1933, the son of Leopold Velemínský and his wife Marie (née Mikuskovicová). He graduated from the Faculty of Science of Charles University, Prague in 1957.

== Career ==
From 1956 to 1960 Velemínský taught at the then Pedagogical Institute in Prague. He obtained his degree in 1964, his RNDr. in 1968 and became a Doctor of Sciences in 1988. From 1963 he was employed by the Czech Academy of Sciences' Institute of Experimental Botany and was its director from 1990 to 1998. His scientific work focused mainly on mutagenesis in plants.

As well as undertaking his own scientific work, he was also very active in the transformation of Czech science after 1989. He was the Czech Academy of Sciences' interim chairman from 1992 to 1993, its vice-chairman from 1993 to 1998 and, from 2006 until his death, vice-chairman of its grant agency. He was a member of editorial boards of several scientific journals, including Biologia Plantarum. (Note: Biologia Plantarum is a quarterly journal published by Springer Science+Business Media and the Institute of Experimental Botany of the Czech Academy of Sciences.)

He continued to work until his death in Prague on 23 February 2008, aged 74.

== Awards ==
In 2007 he received the Honorary Medal of the Academy of Sciences of the Czech Republic, De Scientia Et Humanitate Optime Meritis.

== Publications ==
- Velemínský's published research

== Personal and family life ==
Jiří Velemínský was a distant cousin of the physician and scientist Friedrich Weleminsky. He lived in Prague with his wife Dagmar (Daca; née Koflak), whom he married in 1961. They had two sons: Petr (born 1964) and Martin (born 1971).

== See also ==
- Weleminsky
