= The Story of San Michele =

1929 memoirs by Axel Munthe

- First US edition (1931, E. P. Dutton)
- Author: Axel Munthe
- Original title: The Story of San Michele
- Language: English
- Genre: Memoirs, autobiography, novel
- Publisher: John Murray
- Publication date: 1929
- Publication place: England

The Story of San Michele is a book of memoirs by Swedish physician Axel Munthe (October 31, 1857 – February 11, 1949) first published in 1929 by British publisher John Murray. Written in English, it was a bestseller in numerous languages and has been republished constantly in the nine decades since its original release.

== Munthe ==
Munthe grew up in Sweden. At the age of seventeen, he was on a sailing trip which included a brief visit to the Italian island of Capri. Hiking up the Phoenician steps to the village of Anacapri, Munthe came across a ruined chapel owned by a nearby resident, Maestro Vincenzo, and fantasized owning and restoring the property. The chapel, dedicated to San Michele, had been built on some of the ruins of Roman Emperor Tiberius' villa.

Munthe went to medical school in France and then opened a medical practice in Paris. He later assisted in the 1884 cholera epidemic in Naples. In 1887, he managed to buy the ruined chapel, and subsequently spent much of his life on Capri building the Villa San Michele. Munthe also had a medical practice in Rome in order to help pay for construction.

== The book ==
The Story of San Michele has 32 chapters, approximately 368 pages. It is a series of overlapping vignettes, roughly but not entirely in chronological order. It contains reminiscences of many periods of his life. He associated with a number of celebrities of his times, including Jean-Martin Charcot, Louis Pasteur, Henry James, and Guy de Maupassant, all of whom figure in the book. He also associated with the very poorest of people, including Italian immigrants in Paris and plague victims in Naples, as well as rural people such as the residents of Capri, and the Nordic Lapplanders. He was an unabashed animal lover, and animals figure prominently in several stories.

The stories cover a wide range in terms of both how serious they are and how literal. Several discussions with animals and supernatural beings take place, and the final chapter actually takes place after Munthe has died and includes his discussions with Saint Peter at the gates of Heaven. At no point does Munthe seem to take himself particularly seriously, but some of the things he discusses are very serious, such as his descriptions of rabies research in Paris, including euthanasia of human patients, and a suicide attempt by a man convinced he had been exposed to the disease.

Several of the most prominent figures in Munthe's life are not mentioned in Story of San Michele. His wives and children do not figure in the narrative, and he even describes himself as "a single man" in the last chapter, when he had been married for about 20 years; very little of his time in England is mentioned, even though he married a British woman, his children were largely raised in England, and he himself became a British citizen during the First World War. His decades-long service as personal physician and confidant to the Queen of Sweden is mentioned only in the most oblique terms; at one point, while naming her only as "she who must be mother to a whole nation", he mentions that she regularly brings flowers for the grave of one of her dogs buried at Villa San Michele, at another point, one of his servants is out walking his dogs, and encounters the Queen, who mentions having given the dog to Munthe. His work with a French ambulance corps during the First World War is mentioned only briefly, in connection with the use of hypnotic anaesthesia when no chemical anaesthetics were available – fatally injured soldiers often died with "a smile on their lips, with my hand on their forehead."

Munthe published a few other reminiscences and essays during the course of his life, and some of them were incorporated into The Story of San Michele, which vastly overshadows all his other writing both in length and popularity.

Worldwide, the book was immensely successful; by 1930, there had been twelve editions of the English version alone, and Munthe added a second preface. A third preface was written in 1936 for an illustrated edition.

It was translated into Esperanto by Jenny Weleminsky in 1935.

== Film adaptation ==
A German-language film adaptation Axel Munthe, The Doctor of San Michele was released in 1962 by Gloria Film.

== Criticism ==
As with any work, not everyone liked it; publisher Kurt Wolff wrote:

I was the first German publisher to be offered The Story of San Michele. I read it in the German translation and found it so unbelievably trite, vain, and embarrassing that I did not hesitate for a moment in rejecting it.

== See also ==
- Memories and Vagaries
- Villa San Michele

== Sources and bibliography ==
- The Story of San Michele, Axel Munthe. Many editions including ISBN 0-7195-6699-1, ISBN 978-0-7195-6699-8, ISBN 0-88184-109-9
- Romano de San Michele, Axel Munthe, Esperanto translation by Jenny Weleminsky, Eldonis: Literatura Mondo Budapest, 1935
- Kurt Wolff: A Portrait in Essays and Letters, Kurt Wolff, English translation by Deborah Lucas Schneider, contributor Michael Ermath, 1991, University of Chicago Press, ISBN 0-226-90551-9
