= Guido Elbogen =

Austrian banker (1845–1918)

Guido Elbogen (27 December 1845 – 10 December 1918) was an Austrian banker and mathematician who became President of the Anglo-Austrian Bank.

== Early life ==
He was born into a Jewish family on 27 December 1845 in Mladá Boleslav in Bohemia, Austrian Empire (now in the Czech Republic). Of the children of Rabbi Isak Elbogen and his wife Friederike (née Pokorny) he was the only one to survive beyond infancy.

== Career ==
After studying at the Academy of Commerce in Prague, Elbogen entered the banking business at the Ladenburg Bank in London, before moving to Paris where he joined Oppenheim, Alberti and Co, working to Antoine Schwabacher whose daughter Rosalie he married in 1868. In 1874 a lampooning cartoon of him appeared on the front cover of an issue of the French satirical newspaper Comic-Finance, which also included a biographical piece by the newspaper's editor Ernest Schrameck, writing under the pen name "Sergines". Elbogen made at least 15 business trips to Spain, representing the interests of French banks, including the Bank of Paris, successfully negotiating with the Spanish authorities for the repayment of outstanding bank loans.

In 1877 Elbogen and his family moved from Paris to Vienna, where he took up the post of President of the Anglo-Austrian Bank.

In 1865, Elbogen submitted a proposal for a lottery savings bank, an idea that was taken up in Italy in 1880 and debated in the Italian Parliament, but was not approved.

== Publications ==
- Lotto oder Sparcassen (1880), H Engel.
- (with Alie Elbogen) Der Großeltern Vermächtnis (1904), Engel und Sohn.

== Personal life ==
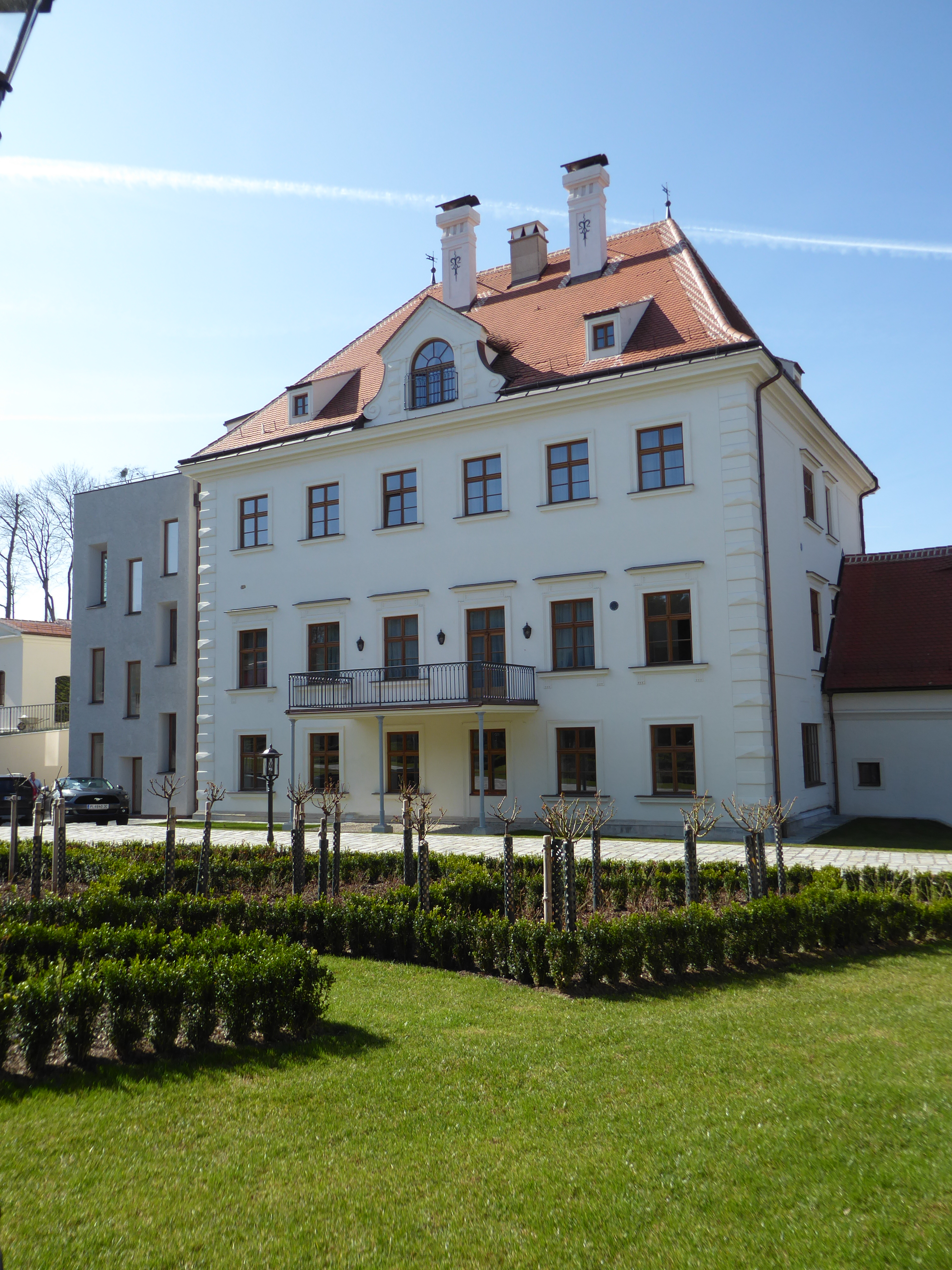
Schloss Thalheim, Elbogen's country estate in Lower Austria

In 1868, in Paris, he married Rosalie (Alie), daughter of banker Antoine Schwabacher and his wife Helene, née Hendle.

Elbogen and his family moved to Vienna when he joined the Anglo-Austrian Bank; he also bought a country estate, Schloss Thalheim, in Lower Austria. (Note: Schloss Thalheim is in the village of Thalheim (Kapelln), today a part of Kapelln, Sankt Pölten-Land District; see de:Liste der denkmalgeschützten Objekte in Kapelln#Denkmäler, Jakob Prandtauer. After restoration it reopened in 2016 as a luxury hotel.)

They had three daughters and a son:

- Antoinette (1871–1901)
- Heinrich (also known as Henri, 1872–1927)
- Helene (1878–1882)
- Jenny (1882–1957) who married Friedrich Weleminsky. She inherited Schloss Thalheim from her father.

== Death ==
Elbogen died on 10 December 1918 at Schloss Thalheim, aged 72. He is buried at Vienna Central Cemetery.
