= Golčův Jeníkov =

- Town
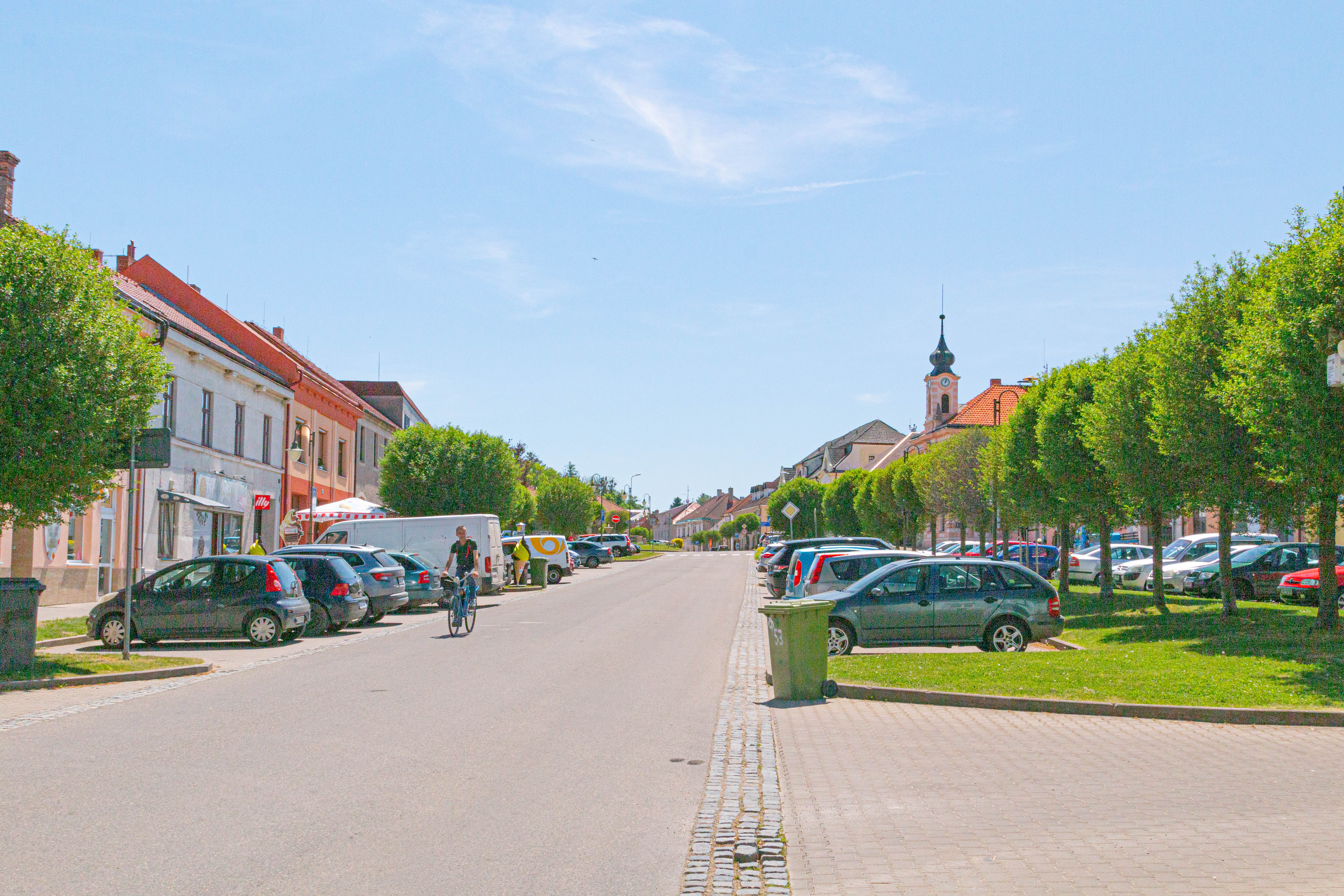
- Town square

- Coat of arms

- Location in the Czech Republic
- Coordinates: 49°48′59″N 15°28′37″E
- Country: Czech Republic
- Region: Vysočina
- District: Havlíčkův Brod
- First mentioned: 1150

Government
  - Mayor: Roman Mazurka

Area
  - Total: 27.49 km^{2} (10.61 sq mi)
- Elevation: 376 m (1,234 ft)

Population (2026-01-01)
  - Total: 2,835
  - Density: 103.1/km^{2} (267.1/sq mi)
- Time zone: UTC+1 (CET)
  - Summer (DST): UTC+2 (CEST)
- Postal code: 582 82
- Website: www.golcuv-jenikov.cz

Golčův Jeníkov (Czech pronunciation: [ˈɡoltʃuːf ˈjɛɲiːkof]; German: Goltsch-Jenikau) is a town in Havlíčkův Brod District in the Vysočina Region of the Czech Republic. It has about 2,800 inhabitants.

== Administrative division ==
Golčův Jeníkov consists of seven municipal parts (in brackets population according to the 2021 census):

- Golčův Jeníkov (2,268)
- Kobylí Hlava (64)
- Nasavrky (52)
- Římovice (60)
- Sirákovice (76)
- Stupárovice (52)
- Vrtěšice (21)

== Etymology ==
The initial name of the settlement was just Jeníkov. The name was derived from the personal name Jeník (a diminutive form of Jan), meaning "Jeník's (court)". In the second half of the 17th century, the name Golčův Jeníkov ("Goltz's Jeníkov") began to be used to distinguish it from other places with the same name.

== Geography ==
Golčův Jeníkov is located about 24 kilometres (15 mi) north of Havlíčkův Brod and 32 km (20 mi) southwest of Pardubice. It lies in the Upper Sázava Hills. The highest point is at 446 m (1,463 ft) above sea level. Inside the built-up area is a system of three fishponds, supplied by the stream Vohančický potok and its nameless tributary.

== History ==
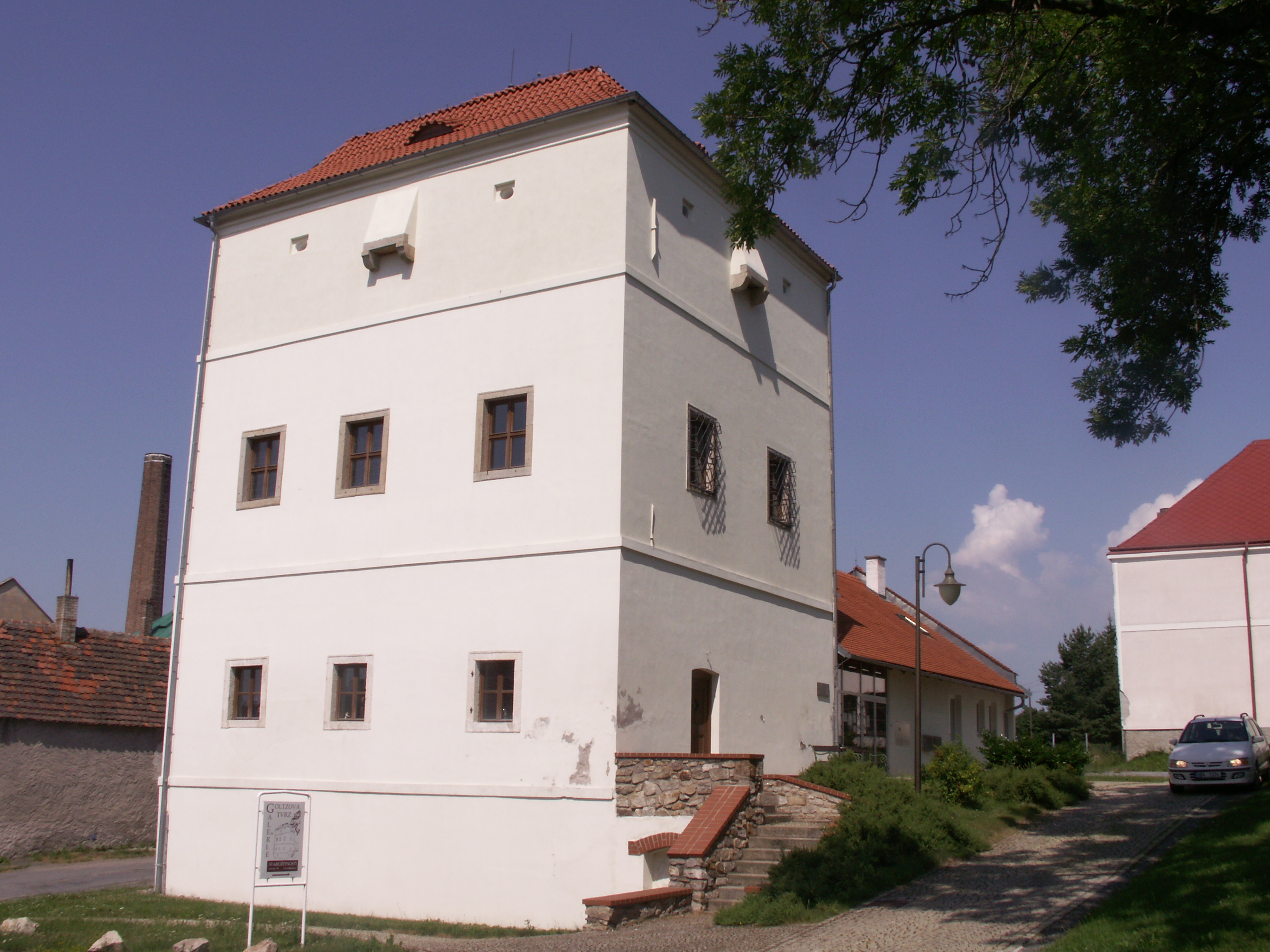
Golcz Fortress, nowadays an art gallery

=== 12th–16th centuries ===
The first written mention of Jeníkov is in a letter from the Olomouc Bishop Jindřich Zdík not older than from 1150. The settlement was probably founded in the 10th century. The next mention of Jeníkov is in the list of the Diocese of Prague from the years 1344–1350. The first mentions of surrounding villages, now parts of Golčův Jeníkov, are from the 14th century; Podmoky was mentioned in 1360, a fortress in Římovice in 1372, and Kobylí Hlava in 1391.

At the beginning of the 14th century, the first Jews settled in the village. At the and of the 14th century, Jeníkov was owned by the Chlum family and then briefly the Podhořany family. In 1417, Jeníkov is first referred to as a market town. During the Hussite Wars, it was a centre of the insurgency. From 1468 until 1580, Jeníkov was almost continuously owned by the Slavata of Chlum and Košumberk family.

During the 16th century, crafts and trade were developed. The Jeníkov estate became rich and prospered. In 1580, Václav Robmháp of Suchá and from Seč bought Jeníkov and the neighbouring estate of Zábělčice, and merged them.

=== 17th–18th centuries ===
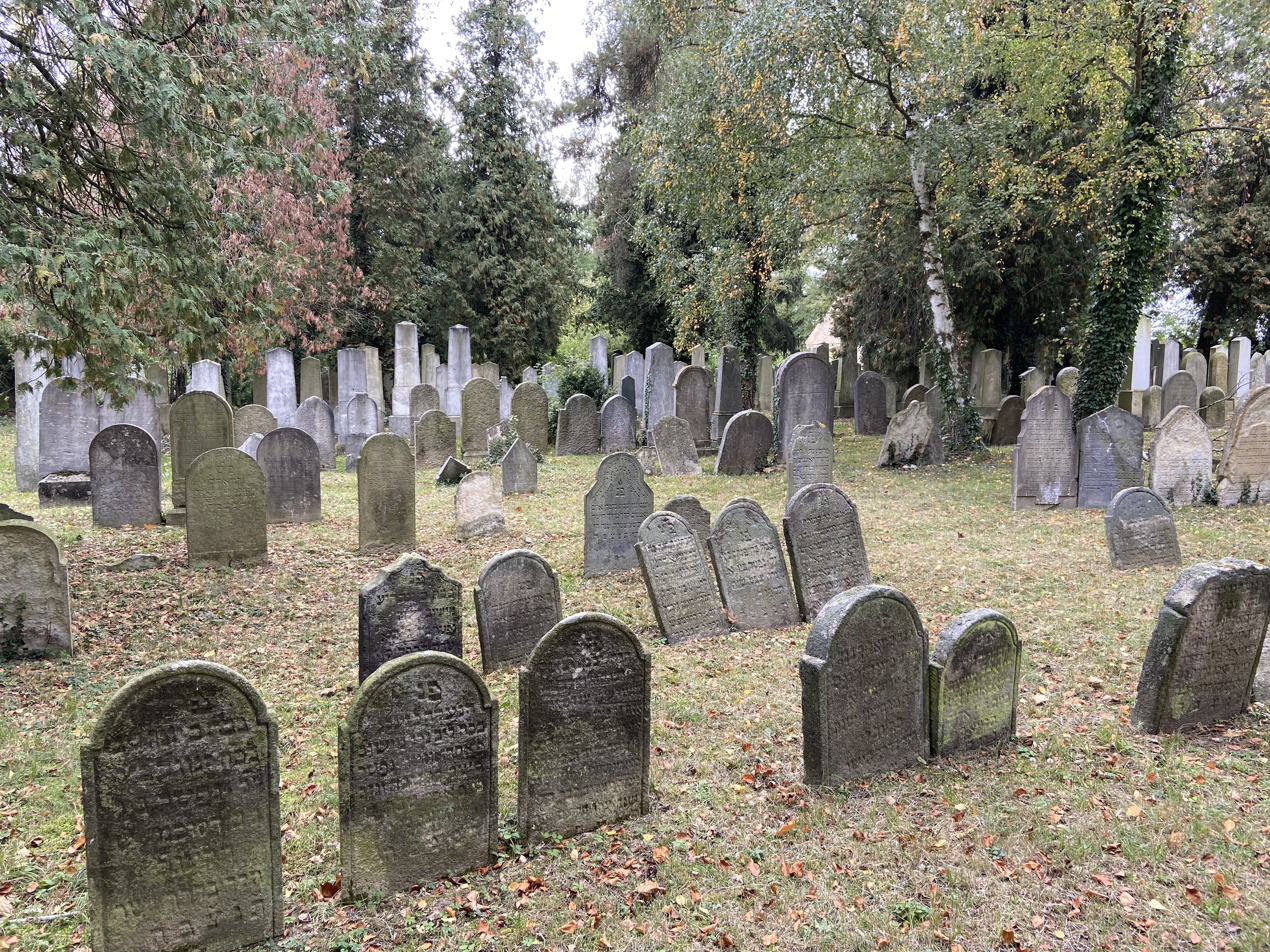
Jewish cemetery

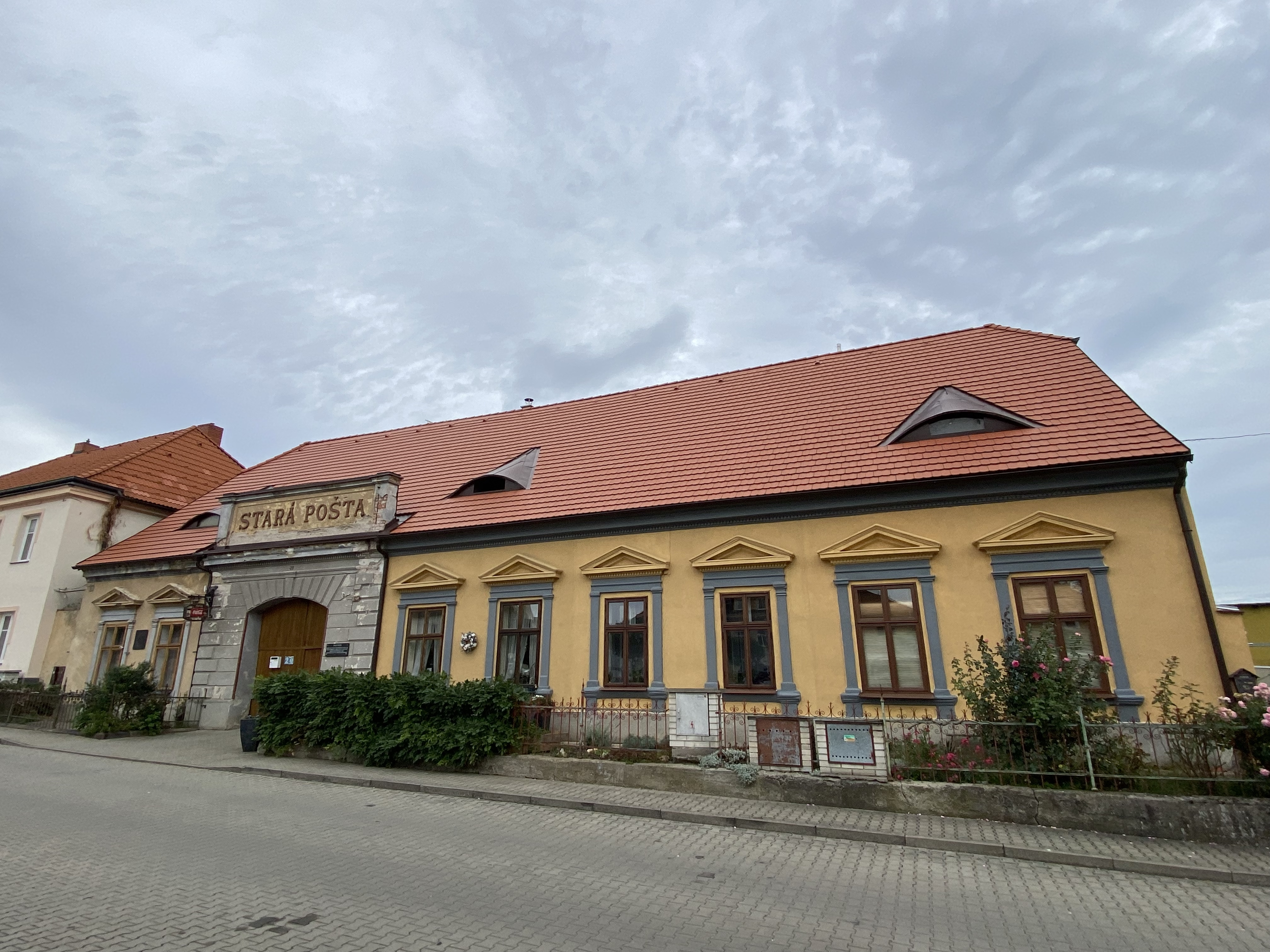
Old post office on the town square

During the Thirty Years' War, Jeníkov was burned several times, for the first time by the troops of General Charles Bonaventure, Count of Bucquoy in 1619 and last time by the army of General Johan Banér. From 1632 to 1636, the Jeníkov estate was owned by Jan Rudolf Trčka of Lípa. In 1636, the estate was given to General Martin Maxmillian of Goltz by the Emperor as a reward for services.

During the rule of General Goltz and his wife, Jeníkov was rebuilt and improved. A significant part of theirs activities was motivated by the effort to re-Catholicize the Utraquist estate. Goltz had the stone town hall, tower fortress, Loreta chapel and deanery built. In 1640, he had the Church of the Holy Cross rebuilt and consecrated it to the Virgin Mary. Goltz later also invited the Jesuits to Jeníkov and had started construction of the Jesuit college, finished after his death in 1653 by his wife. For his contribution to the market town, it became known as Golčův Jeníkov.

After Goltz and four years later his wife died without offspring, they inherited Golčův Jeníkov to their nephew Johann Dietrich of Ledebour possession with order to build a bell tower and give 1,000 guilders to the Jesuits every year. After failing the will and losing the lawsuit in 1672, he was forced to sell the estate to Countess Barbara Eusebia Caretto-Millesimo.

In 1766, Golčův Jeníkov was acquired by Filip Kolowrat-Krakowsky. His son Leopold Kolowrat-Krakowsky converted the old castle to a tobacco factory. He also founded here the first needle factory in Europe and introduced the cultivation of alfalfa, clover and potatoes. In 1773, he received confiscated property of Jesuits from Maria Theresa. On 21 October 1784, half of the market town was destroyed by a fire, including Loreta chapel and deanery.

=== 19th–20th centuries ===
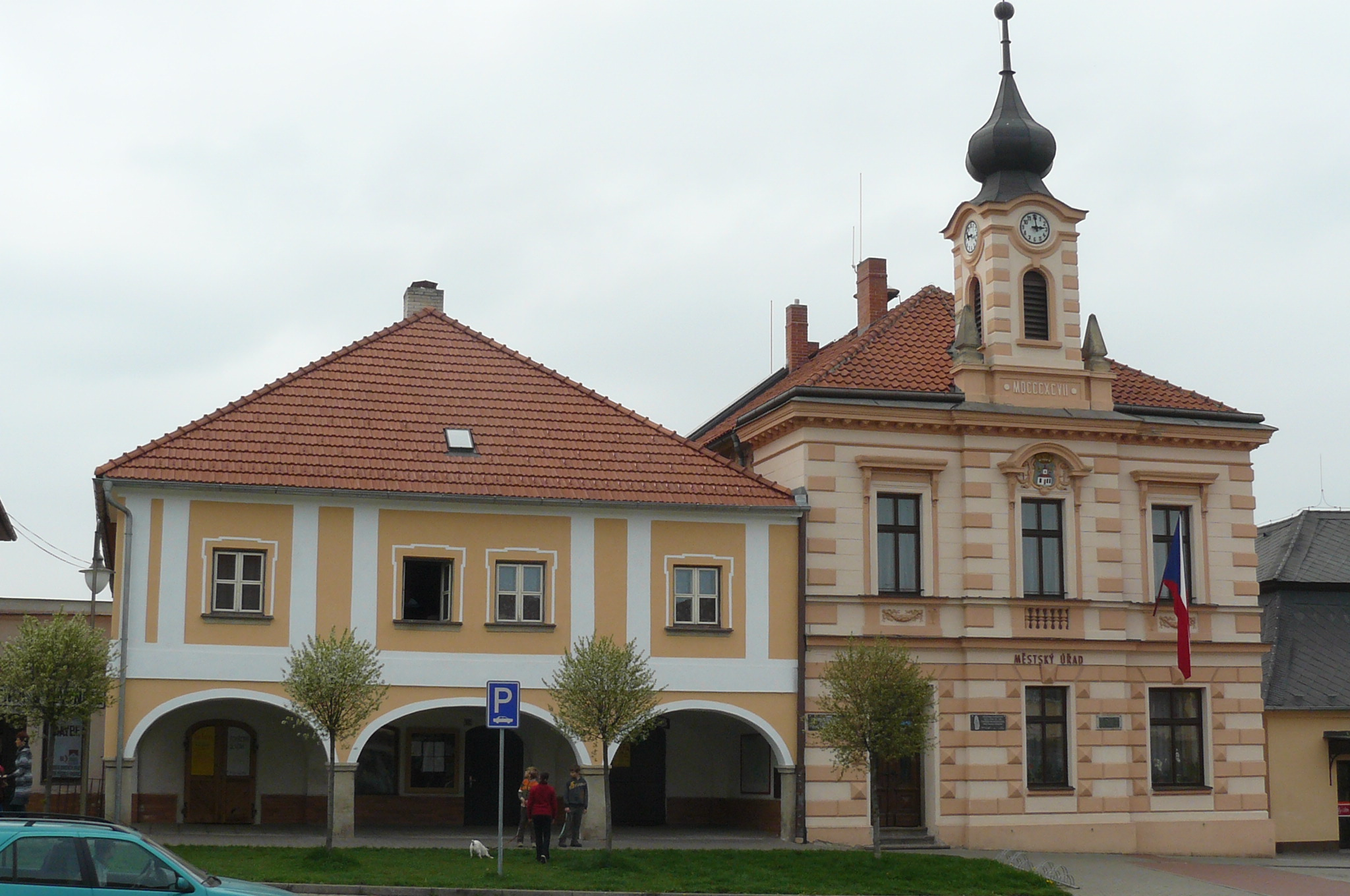
Town hall

A hereditary dispute broke out, which lasted until 1817 and brought Golčův Jeníkov to decline. The needle factory was closed and the tobacco factory was moved to Sedlec. In 1817, Kolowrat's daughter Louise of Herberstein eventually bought the estate. Her property was inherited by under-age minor son and the estate was administered by his trustee Hugo of Eger. He founded the Church of Saint Francis of Assisi, had the former tobacco factory rebuilt into a castle, and founded an English style park.

After the abolishment of serfdom in 1848, Golčův Jeníkov became an independent municipality. In 1913, Golčův Jeníkov was promoted to a town.

== Demographics ==
Historical population

Year	Pop.	±%
1869	4,322	—
1880	4,088	−5.4%
1890	3,757	−8.1%
1900	3,732	−0.7%
1910	3,849	+3.1%

Year	Pop.	±%
1921	3,731	−3.1%
1930	3,465	−7.1%
1950	2,932	−15.4%
1961	3,002	+2.4%
1970	2,874	−4.3%

Year	Pop.	±%
1980	2,758	−4.0%
1991	2,746	−0.4%
2001	2,604	−5.2%
2011	2,616	+0.5%
2021	2,593	−0.9%

Source: Censuses

== Transport ==
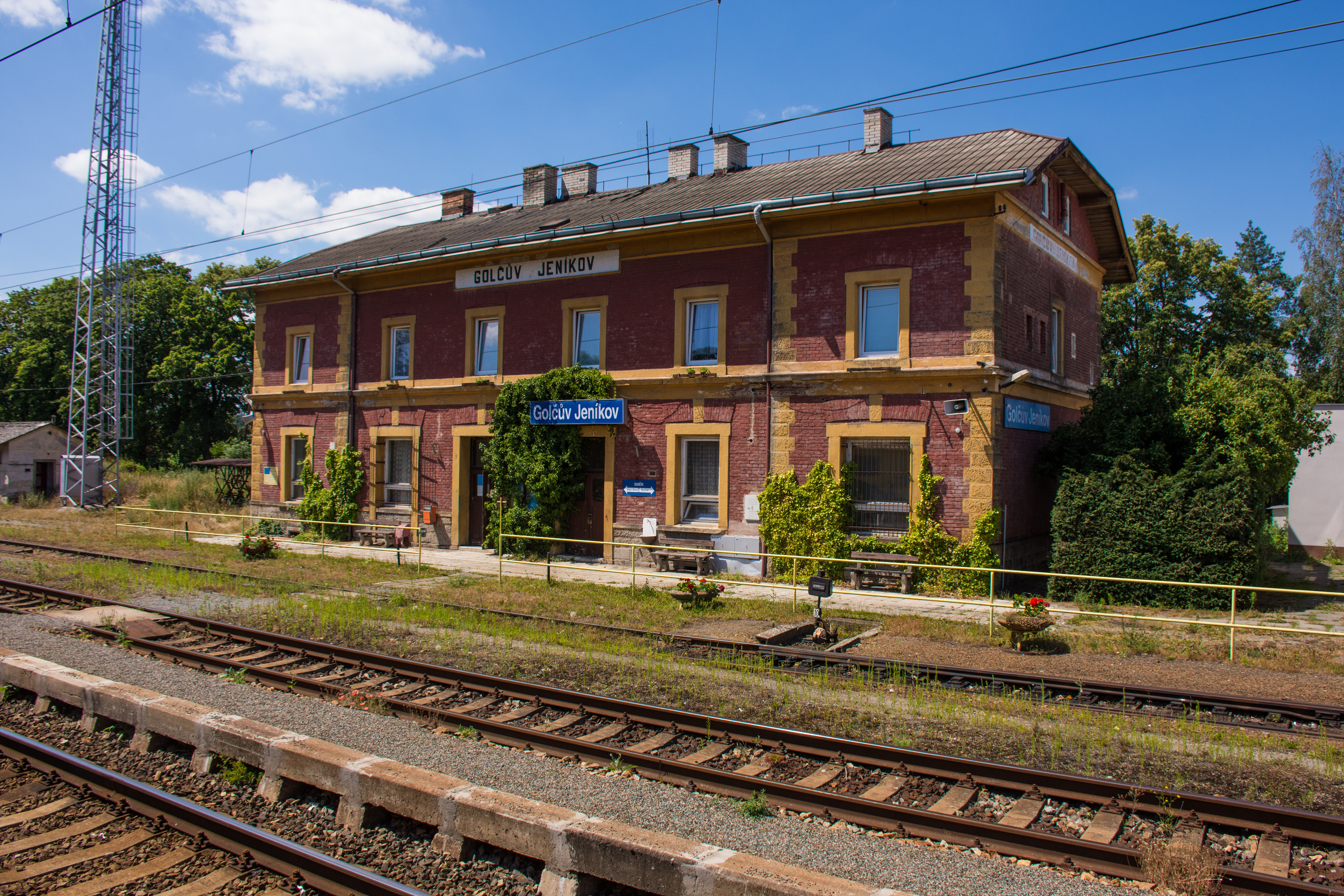
Golčův Jeníkov train station

The I/38 road (the section from Havlíčkův Brod to Kutná Hora) runs through the town.

Golčův Jeníkov is located on the railway Kolín–Žďár nad Sázavou. It is served by two railway stations: Golčův Jeníkov and Golčův Jeníkov město.

== Sights ==
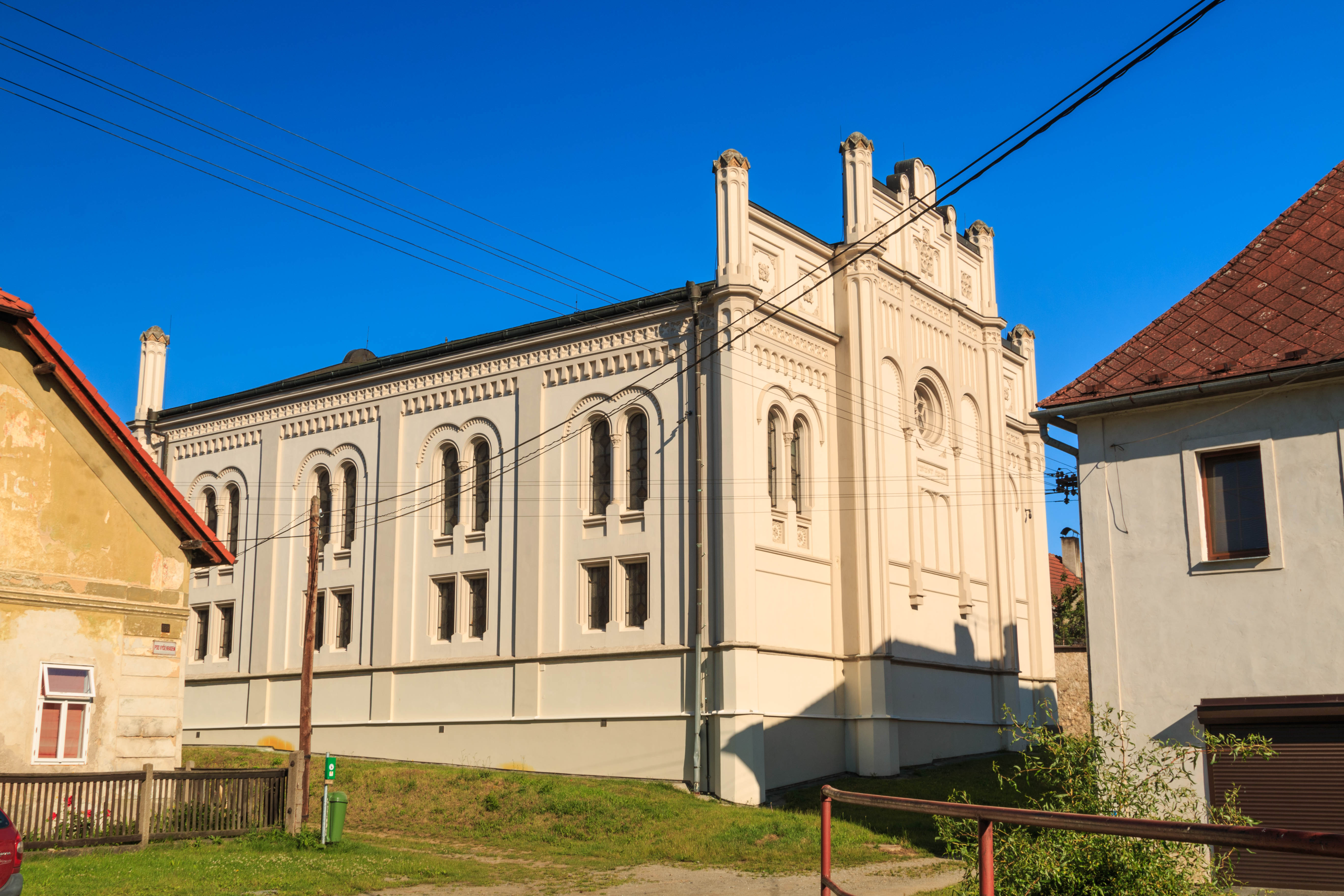
Synagogue

Among the main landmarks is the Goltz Fortress. It is a late Renaissance rectangular two-storey tower fortress. It was originally used for defensive purposes, but today it houses an art gallery.

The castle complex is formed by the Old Castle and the New Castle. They are simple former feudal residences. They were originally built in the Baroque style in the 18th century, but later were modified in the Empire style.

The Church of Saint Francis of Assissi was built in the Empire style in the mid-19th century next to a Loreto chapel from the 17th century. The church complex also has an enclosed garden between the buildings.

The Church of Saint Margaret is located on a hill above the town. It has an early Gothic core. It was rebuilt in the Neoclassical style at the beginning of the 19th century.

The Jewish community is commemorated by the former synagogue and Jewish cemetery. The synagogue was first documented in 1659. After it was destroyed by a fire in 1871, the new synagogue was built in 1873. Today it is owned by the Jewish Community in Prague and used as depository of the Jewish Museum in Prague. The cemetery is one of the oldest in Bohemia. It is 7,336 square metres (78,960 sq ft) large and was founded probably in the 14th century. The oldest preserved readable tombstone is from 1705.

== Notable people ==
- Zsigmond Kornfeld (1852–1909), Hungarian banker and baron
- Friedrich Weleminsky (1868–1945), medical doctor, scientist and microbiologist
- Zbyněk Šidák (1933–1999), mathematician
- Jarmila Kratochvílová (born 1951), track and field athlete
