= Heinrich Elbogen =

Austrian sport shooter (1872–1927)

Personal information
- Nationality: Austrian
- Born: 18 June 1872 Paris, France
- Died: 8 December 1927 (aged 55) Vienna, Austria
- Resting place: Zentralfriedhof (also known as Vienna Central Cemetery), Wien Stadt, Vienna, A-1110 Austria

Sport
- Country: Austria
- Sport: Sport shooting
- Event: 1912 Olympic Games

Heinrich Elbogen (18 June 1872 – 8 December 1927) was an Austrian sport shooter who competed in the 1912 Summer Olympics.

He was born on 18 June 1872 to a Jewish family in Paris, France, the second child and the only son of banker Guido Elbogen (1845–1918) and his wife Rosalie (Alie) (née Schwabacher; 1850–1940). Of his three sisters, one died in infancy; his youngest sister, Jenny, was a noted Esperantist.

When his father became President of the Anglo-Austrian Bank in Vienna, the family moved to Vienna; his father also bought a country estate, Schloss Thalheim, in Lower Austria, (Note: Schloss Thalheim is in the village of Thalheim (Kapelln), today a part of Kapelln, Sankt Pölten-Land District; See de:Liste der denkmalgeschützten Objekte in Kapelln#Denkmäler, Jakob Prandtauer. After restoration it reopened in 2016 as a luxury hotel.) and the family spent their summers there.

He took part in the 1912 Summer Olympics at Stockholm as a member of the Austrian shooting team, which finished fourth in the team 100 metre running deer, single shots competition. In the 100 metre running deer, single shots event he finished seventh, and in the 100 metre running deer, double shots competition he finished 16th.

In 1916, while serving with the Austro-Hungarian Army during the First World War, Elbogen was taken prisoner by the Russians and kept in captivity in Siberia. He returned to Thalheim four years later, exhausted from having made a very long journey home, much of it on foot.

He died in Vienna on 8 December 1927, aged 55, and is buried at Vienna Central Cemetery.
