= Journal of Molecular Medicine =

- Discipline: Human molecular biology and pathophysiology
- Language: English
- Edited by: Ari Waisman

Publication details
- Former names: Klinische Wochenschrift, The Clinical Investigator
- History: 1864-present
- Publisher: Springer Science+Business Media
- Frequency: Continuous Article Publishing
- Impact factor: 5.0 (2025)

Standard abbreviations
- ISO 4: J. Mol. Med.
- NLM: J Mol Med (Berl)

Indexing
- CODEN: JMLME8
- ISSN: 1432-1440
- LCCN: sn95038252
- OCLC no.: 32140699

Links
- Journal homepage; Online access

The Journal of Molecular Medicine is a peer-reviewed, scientific journal published by Springer Science+Business Media. It covers all aspects of human biology and pathophysiology. The emphasis is on the progress and precision now possible in the understanding, prevention, diagnosis and treatment of human diseases. The employment of molecular biology and gene technology has enhanced the understanding of human diseases and has created a new branch of research known as "molecular medicine". More details on the published content can be found here.

The journal is the continuation of the Klinische Wochenschrift (Journal for Clinical Medicine) established in 1864 and published by Springer for the Society of German Natural Scientists and Physicians. From 1992 to 1994, the journal's title was The Clinical Investigator. It covers research in the areas of molecular and translational medicine and publishes original papers, review articles and correspondence pertinent to all aspects of human biology and pathophysiology.
