= Bernard S. Baker =

American electrochemist

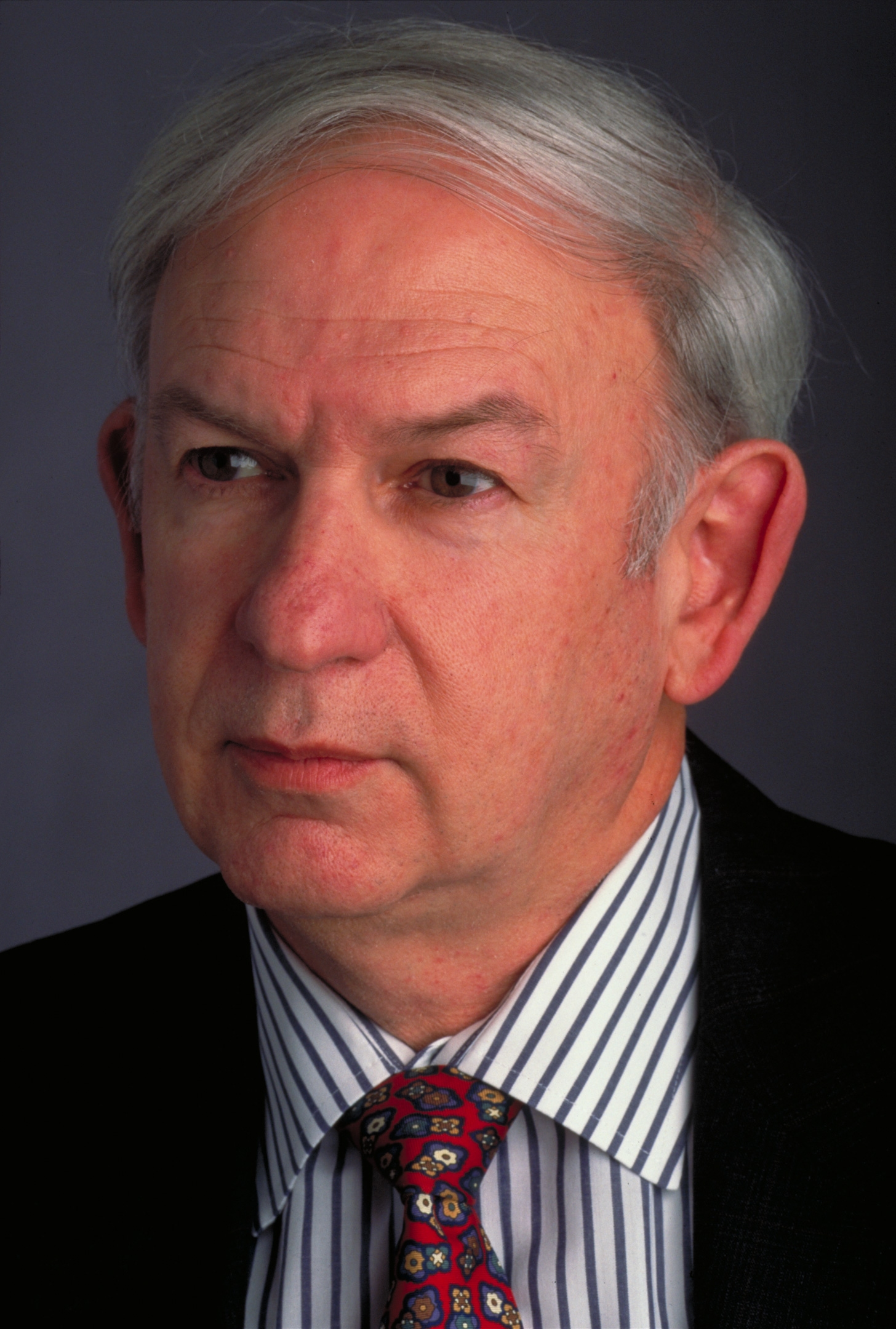
Bernard S. Baker

Bernard S. Baker (June 26, 1936 – June 21, 2004) is an American electrochemist who was a pioneer in the field of electrochemistry. He was a founder and served as president, chief executive officer and chairman of Energy Research Corporation (now called FuelCell Energy, Inc., in Danbury, Connecticut), developer and manufacturer of direct fuel cells (MCFC) used to generate electric power. Power plants based on his concepts are providing electricity in distributed generation locations throughout the world.

Baker directed research in and development of various electrochemical power generation devices, including different types of fuel cells, batteries and hybrid systems. Baker's expertise encompassed fundamental research as well as the technological, engineering, system and marketing aspects of these systems, including "direct fuel cells", which can process hydrocarbon fuels such as natural gas without an external reformer.

Baker received his bachelor's and master's degrees in chemical engineering from the University of Pennsylvania and was a post-graduate Fulbright fellow at the Laboratory for Electrochemistry of the University of Amsterdam, before earning a doctorate from the Illinois Institute of Technology in 1969. His doctoral thesis was also on fuel cell heat transfer and internal reforming.

Before joining Energy Research Corporation, Baker was director of basic sciences at the Institute of Gas Technology in Chicago, where he directed research in the area of energy conversion and fuel cells. Before that, he was senior scientist at Lockheed Aircraft Corporation, Missiles & Space Division, where he was responsible for research on carbonate fuel cell systems and electrochemical kinetic studies.

Baker is a major contributor to the field of fuel cell research, development and commercialization. He was issued 20 U.S. patents relating to fuel cells and other electrochemical systems. He authored more than 100 publications, including technical papers, books and symposia proceedings on the subject of fuel cells.

In 1999, he received the Grove Medal, which was presented in conjunction with the Sixth Grove Fuel Cell Symposium in London and is awarded to acknowledge an individual or company that has made valuable contributions toward the development and success of fuel cell technology.

At the time of the award, the chairman of the Grove Symposium Steering Committee said: "Dr. Bernard S. Baker devoted his entire professional career to develop and promote fuel cells. In the beginning as a scientist, finally as a top manager he dealt with various fuel cells including alkaline, phosphoric acid and molten carbonate technologies. Dr. Baker personifies a remarkable combination of scientific capabilities and management skills. This unique blend enabled him not only to have many patents on fuel cell related inventions and to issue more than 100 fuel cell publications but to build up one of the world wide leading companies in the carbonate fuel cell technology."

Baker received the Cecil J. Previdi Award for Entrepreneurial Spirit and Business Leadership in 1995. He was a Ralph E. Peck lecturer at the Illinois Institute of Technology in 1994.

== Selected publications ==
=== Technical ===
- Hydrocarbon Fuel Cell Technology, (Editor), 1965, American Chemical Society, ISBN 0-12-074250-0
- Fuel Cell Systems-II: 5th Biennal Fuel Cell Symposium sponsored by the Division of Fuel Chemistry at the 154th Meeting of the American Chemical Society, Chicago, IL, September 12–17, 1967. (Advances in Chemistry Series 90. ), (Symposium chairman), 1967, American Chemical Society, Library of Congress Catalog Card 76-99924
