= Biologia Plantarum =

- Discipline: Botany
- Language: English
- Edited by: Jana Pospíšilová

Publication details
- History: 1959–present
- Publisher: Institute of Experimental Botany, Czech Academy of Sciences
- Frequency: Quarterly
- Open access: Yes
- License: CC-BY-NC-ND
- Impact factor: 1.122 (2021)

Standard abbreviations
- ISO 4: Biol. Plant.

Indexing
- CODEN: BPABAJ
- ISSN: 0006-3134 (print); 1573-8264 (web)
- LCCN: 61036430
- OCLC no.: 231018618

Links
- Journal homepage; Online access; Online archive

Biologia Plantarum is a peer-reviewed open-access scientific journal covering experimental botany. It was established in 1959 by the Czech plant physiologist Bohumil Němec. It is published by the Institute of Experimental Botany, Czech Academy of Sciences. The journal was distributed by Springer Science+Business Media until 2018.

The editor-in-chief is Jana Pospíšilová (Czech Academy of Sciences). Since 2019, it is an open-access journal, whose articles are distributed under the terms of the Creative Commons BY-NC-ND licence. While the journal had a print version in the past, it is now only published online.

== Abstracting and indexing ==
The journal is indexed and abstracted in the following bibliographic databases:

- Aquatic Sciences & Fisheries Abstracts
- Biological Abstracts
- BIOSIS Previews
- CAB Abstracts
- Chemical Abstracts Service
- Current Contents/Agriculture, Biology & Environmental Sciences
- EBSCO databases
- ProQuest databases
- Science Citation Index Expanded
- Scopus

According to the Journal Citation Reports, the journal has a 2018 impact factor of 1.384.
