= Friedrich Weleminsky =

Austrian-Czech medical doctor and scientist (1868–1945)

Dr Friedrich Weleminsky
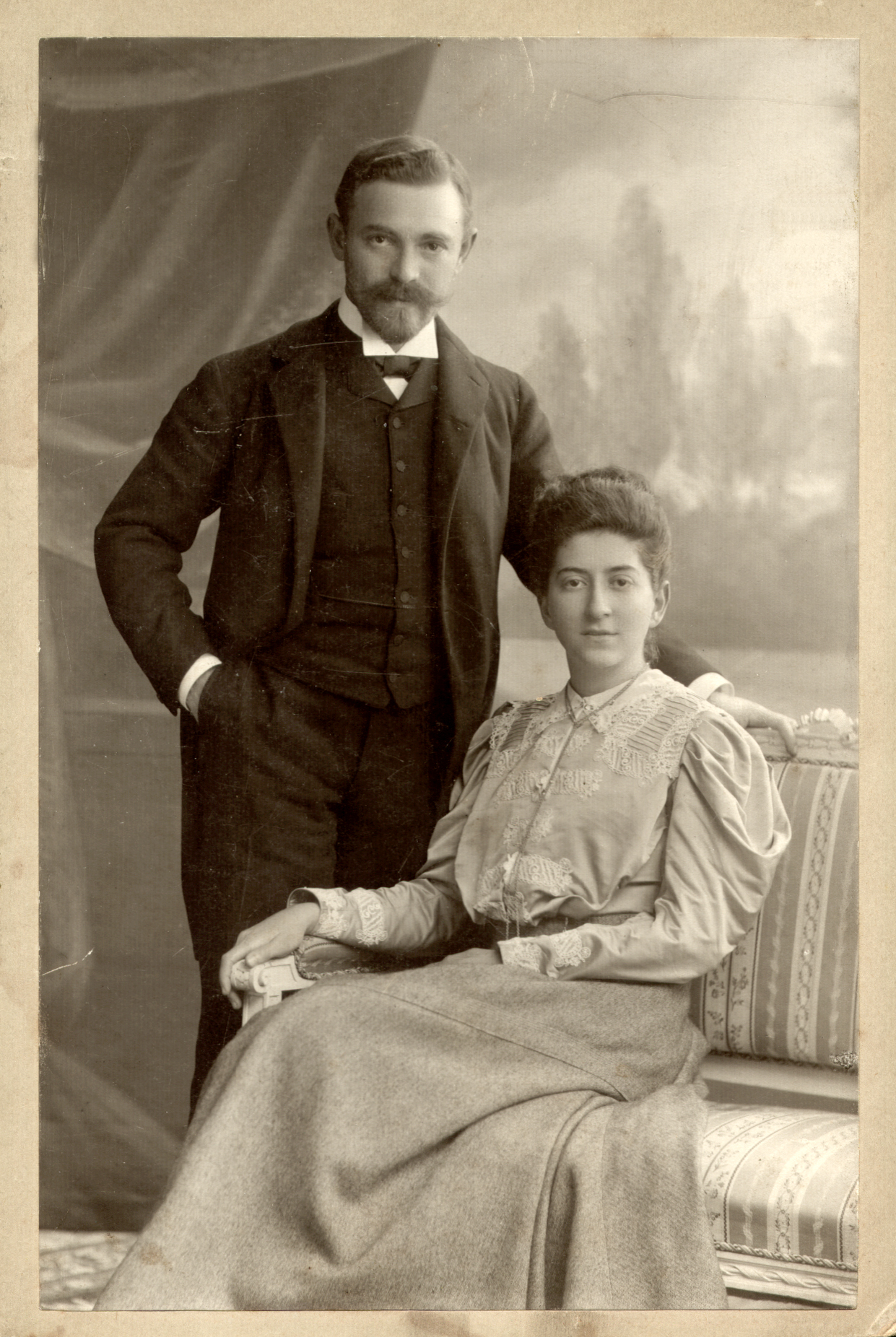
- Portrait picture of Friedrich & Jenny Weleminsky in c. 1905–1910
- Born: 20 January 1868; Golčův Jeníkov, Bohemia, Austria-Hungary
- Died: 1 January 1945 (aged 76); London, England
- Burial place: Golders Green Jewish Cemetery
- Education: Kreuzschule, Dresden, Germany; Charles University (German University, Prague)
- Occupations: Medical doctor, scientist and a Privatdozent in Hygiene (now called Microbiology)
- Spouse(s): Jenny Weleminsky, née Elbogen
- Children: Three daughters and one son: Marianne; Anton; Eliesabeth (Jardenah); Dorothea (Leah)
- Parent(s): Jacob Weleminsky and Bertha Kohn
- Medical career
- Institutions: Charles University (German University, Prague)
- Notable works: Developing tuberculomucin Weleminsky, a treatment for tuberculosis

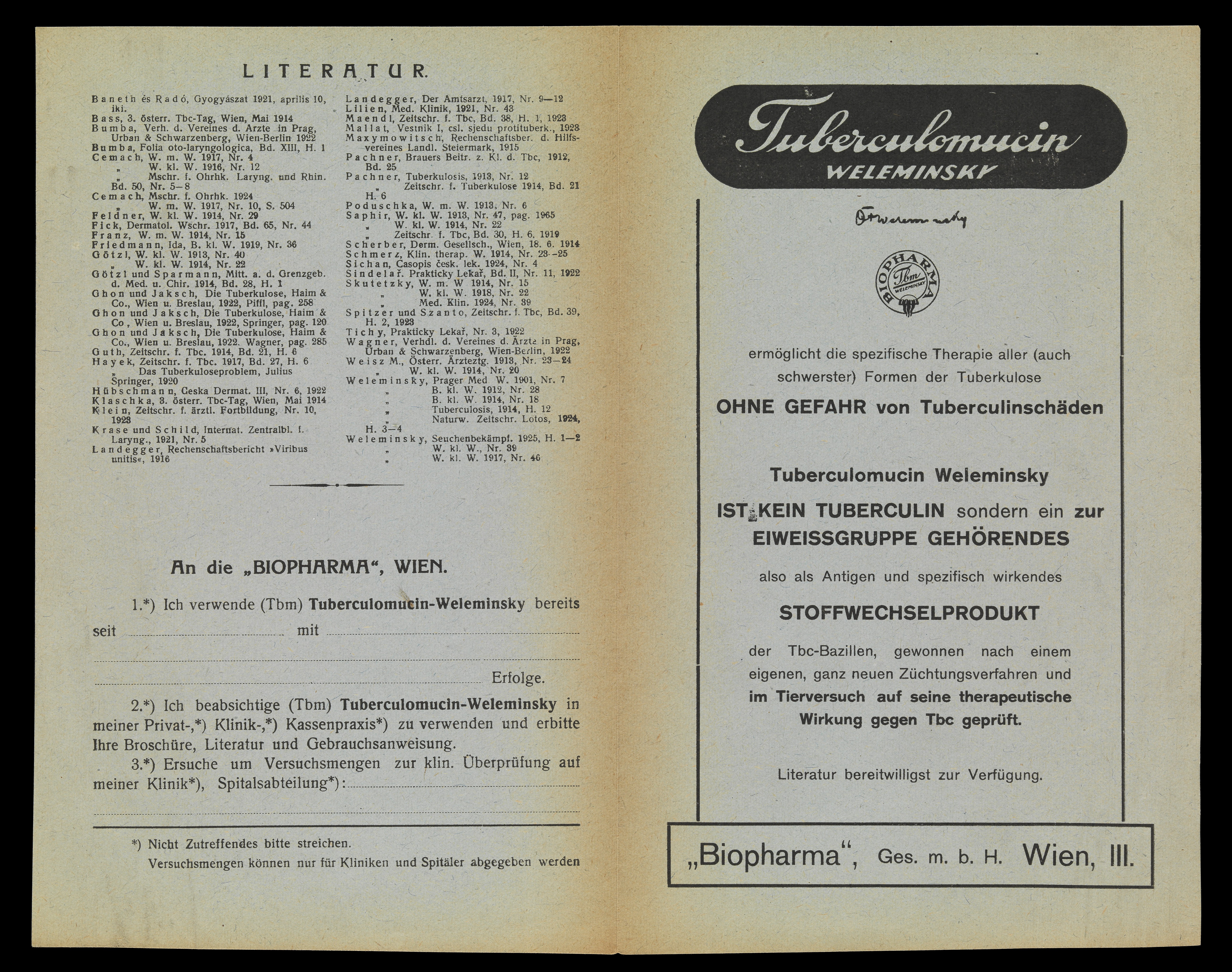
1927 advertisement for tuberculomucin Weleminsky

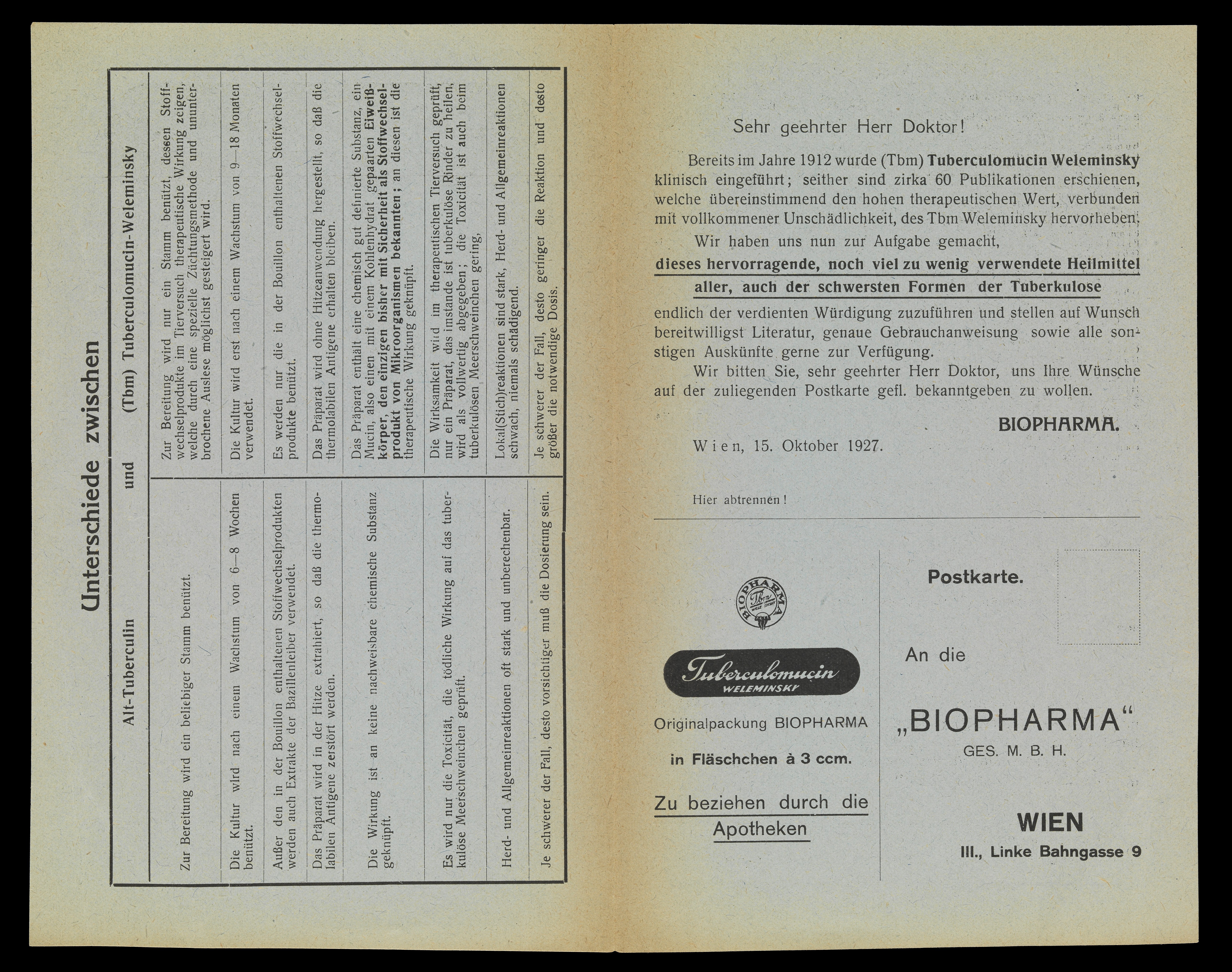
1927 advertisement for tuberculomucin Weleminsky

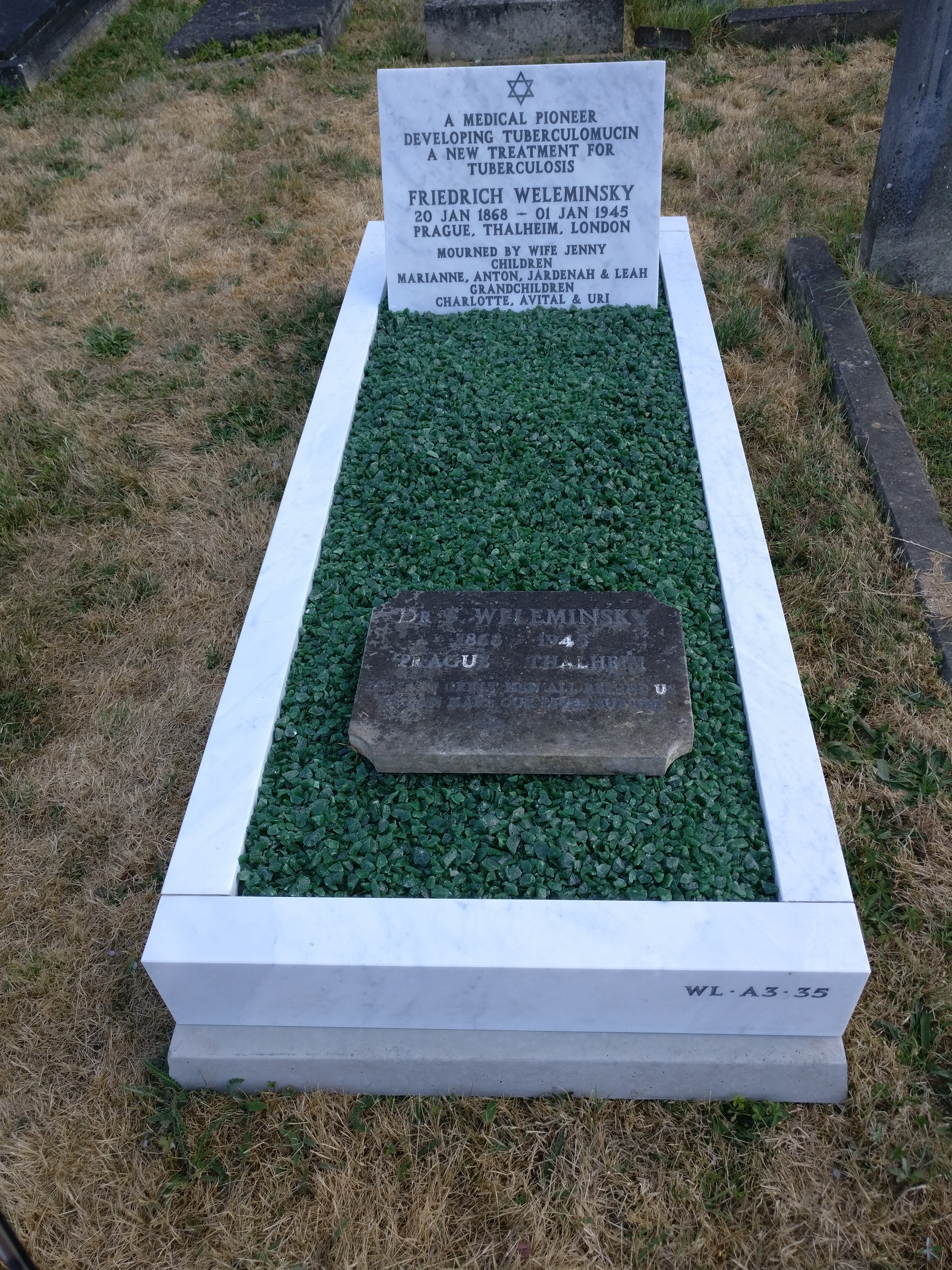
Friedrich Weleminsky's grave at Golders Green Jewish Cemetery, London

Joseph Friedrich ("Fritz") Weleminsky (20 January 1868 – 1 January 1945) was an Austrian-Czech medical doctor and scientist. He was a privatdozent in Hygiene (now called Microbiology) at the German University, Prague (Note: From 1882 to 1939, Charles University in Prague was divided into two institutions, one German-speaking and the other Czech-speaking. See https://cuni.cz/UKEN-106.html) who, in the early 20th century, created an alternative treatment for tuberculosis, tuberculomucin Weleminsky.

== Early life and education ==
He was born into a Jewish family on 20 January 1868 in Golčův Jeníkov in Bohemia, Austria-Hungary (now in the Czech Republic). His parents were Jacob Weleminsky (1834–1905), a general medical practitioner (GP) in Golčův Jeníkov, and his wife Bertha (née Kohn; 1844–1914). Friedrich was their second child; he had an elder sister, Paula (1867–1936), who in 1888 married a Dresden lawyer, Felix Popper, and a younger brother, Josef ("Pepi") (1870–1937) who, like Friedrich, studied medicine in Prague and who went on to become a laryngologist.

The family moved to Dresden in 1879 when Jacob obtained a position as GP there, and later to Prague. Friedrich attended the Kreuzschule in Dresden and studied medicine in Prague.

== Career ==
Friedrich Weleminsky enrolled in the medical faculty of the German University in Prague in 1893 and obtained a habilitation qualification as Dr.Med. in 1900. He was appointed to a teaching post in the university's medical faculty as a privatdozent in Hygiene in July 1900.

From 1899 to 1901, Weleminsky studied the sanitary and social conditions in Bohemia, and focused his research on alcoholism. He presented a paper to the Eighth International Congress against Alcoholism, in Vienna, in 1901 and successfully argued for the banning of Branntweinlutschbeutel, an infant pacifier that contained brandy.

During the First World War, Weleminsky was in charge of the reserve hospital "Halicz" which was stationed in various parts of Austria and Hungary. While stationed in Kleinreifling, a village in the district of Steyr-Land in Upper Austria, he successfully brought a local typhoid epidemic under control, for which he was made an Ehrenbürger of Weyer.

=== Tuberculomucin Weleminsky ===
Weleminsky's particular area of interest was vaccination against tuberculosis. In 1935, an editorial in the American Journal of Clinical Pathology cited one of his articles as providing "a good review of the voluminous literature accumulated on BCG".

In 1912, Weleminsky, who was then second assistant to Ferdinand Hueppe, the head of the Institute for Hygiene at the German University of Prague, published his discovery of a new treatment for tuberculosis, which he named tuberculomucin (Tbm). It was tested on guinea pigs, with number 1769 being the first to survive due to the treatment in 1909. He also used tuberculomucin Weleminsky (also spelt tuberkulomucin Weleminsky and tuberkulomuzin Weleminsky) to treat cattle which he kept at his wife's family's country retreat, Schloss Thalheim.

More than 60 papers were published in German describing tuberculomucin's use in humans, but very few of them were read by an English-speaking audience. By the mid-1920s it was known as tuberculomucin Weleminsky and at least two companies were involved in producing and marketing the treatment. (Note: The 1927 advertisement pictured here was issued by the Biopharma pharmaceutical company in Vienna. It listed the distinctions between tuberculin and tuberculomucin Weleminsky (TbM) and invited general practitioners and clinical medical doctors to seek a brochure about TbM, or trial samples for clinical testing, by completing and returning a postcard in which they were also asked to say if they were already using Tbm and what success they had experienced in using it.) In 1938, Sanders, a Belgian pharmaceutical company, planned to manufacture Tbm and to make it available in Western Europe and other parts of the developed world. However, Weleminsky fled from Prague in 1939, a couple of weeks before the Nazi invasion of Czechoslovakia, and these plans and further development of the treatment ceased.

== Personal and family life ==
On 4 December 1905 he married Jenny Elbogen (1882–1957), at her parents' country home, Schloss Thalheim, Lower Austria. (Note: Schloss Thalheim is in the village of Thalheim (Kapelln), today a part of Kapelln, Sankt Pölten-Land District; see de:Liste der denkmalgeschützten Objekte in Kapelln#Denkmäler, Jakob Prandtauer. The property was damaged during the Second World War. After restoration, it reopened in 2016 as a luxury hotel.) The married couple lived in Prague and at Schloss Thalheim, which Jenny inherited from her father after his death in 1918 and which they ran as a model dairy farm.

They had four children together. Their eldest daughter, Marianne (born 1906), and their son, Anton (Note: Anton was referred to as "Antonín" in official Czech documents.) (born 1908), came to Britain just before the Second World War. Two of their daughters emigrated in the early 1930s to Mandatory Palestine where they took new names – Eliesabeth (born 1909) became Jardenah, and Dorothea (born 1912) was known as Leah.

Facing Nazi persecution for being Jewish, Friedrich and Jenny Weleminsky found sanctuary in Britain in 1939.

== Death and legacy ==
Friedrich Weleminsky died of pneumonia on 1 January 1945 at Fulham Hospital, London and is buried at Golders Green Jewish Cemetery. His wife Jenny, who was 14 years younger, survived him by 12 years. Their grandchildren and great-grandchildren now live in Britain, Israel, Australia, Sweden and Germany.

In 2011, following an approach by Weleminsky's eldest granddaughter, Dr Charlotte Jones, a retired general practitioner, a team at the University College London's Department of Science and Technology Studies resumed research on tuberculomucin Weleminsky. Since 2017, Friedrich's youngest granddaughter Judy Weleminsky has been leading this research.

== Publications ==
- Basch, K; Weleminsky, Friedrich (1898). "Ueber die Ausscheidung von Krankheitserregern durch die Milch". Jahrb. f. Kinderheilk. 47, 105–115
- Weleminsky, Friedrich (1899). Über Sporenbildung bei Dematium pululans de Bary, 7pp.
- Weleminsky, Friedrich (1899). Ueber Akklimitisation in Grossstädten (On acclimisation in large cities), Oldenbourg: Munich. Off-print from Archiv für Hygiene, 26: 2
- Jadassohn, J; Pick, Walther; Weleminsky, Friedrich (1903). "Buchanzeigen und Besprechungen". Archiv für Dermatologie und Syphilis, 64(1): 149–160
- Weleminsky, Friedrich (1905). "Zur Pathogenese der Lungentuberkulose (On the pathogenesis of lung tuberculosis)". Klinische Wochenschrift (Clinical Weekly). Berlin, Springer-Verlag
- Weleminsky, Friedrich (1906). "Ueber Zuchtung von Mikroorganismen in stromenden Nahrboden". Zentralblatt fur Bakteriologie, Parasitenkunde und Infektionskrankheiten (Central Journal of Bacteriology, Parasitics, Infectious Diseases and Hygiene), 42: 1–7
- Weleminsky, Friedrich (1907). "Der Gang von Infektionen in den Lymphbahnen (The course of infections in the lymphatics)". Klinische Wochenschrift (Clinical Weekly). Berlin, Springer-Verlag
- Weleminsky, Friedrich (1912). "Ueber die Bildung von Elweiss und Mucin durch Tuberkelbacillen". Klinische Wochenschrift (Clinical Weekly). 28: 1–8 Berlin, Springer-Verlag
- Weleminsky, Friedrich (1914). "Tierversuche mit Tuberculomucin". Klinische Wochenschrift (Clinical Weekly). 18: 1–10 Berlin, Springer-Verlag
- Weleminsky, Friedrich (1928). "Filtrable form of tubercle bacilli". Zentralbl. f. d. gesam. Tuberk.Forsch. 28(5/6): 305–310
- Weleminsky, Friedrich (1930). "Die Immunisierung gegen Tuberkulose mit Calmette's BCG". Klinische Wochenschrift (Clinical Weekly). II: 1317–1320 Berlin, Springer-Verlag
- Weleminsky, Friedrich (1930). "Die B.C.G.-Literatur in französischer Sprache". Zentralbl. f. d. gesam. Tuberk.Forsch. 33: 129–135

== See also ==
- Jiří Velemínský
