= Sidak =

Sidak سیدک
- village
- Location within Iran
- Coordinates: 37°22′00″N 45°00′00″E
- Country: Iran
- Province: West Azerbaijan
- County: Urmia
- Bakhsh: Central
- Rural District: Baranduz

Population (2006)
  - Total: 198
- Time zone: UTC+3:30 (IRST)
  - Summer (DST): UTC+4:30 (IRDT)

Sidak (Persian: سیدک, also Romanized as Sīdak) is a village in Baranduz Rural District, in the Central District of Urmia County, West Azerbaijan Province, Iran. At the 2006 census, its population was 198, in 38 families.
