= Zbyněk Šidák =

Czech mathematician

- Born: 24 October 1933; Golčův Jeníkov, Czechoslovakia
- Died: 12 November 1999 (aged 66)
- Education: Charles University in Prague
- Known for: Šidák correction
- Spouse: Krista Štěpničková
- Scientific career
- Fields: Statistics

Zbyněk Šidák (24 October 1933 – 12 November 1999) was a Czech mathematician. He is known for developing the Šidák correction.

== Early life and education ==
Šidák was born and raised in Golčův Jeníkov. He completed his undergraduate studies in statistics at Charles University in Prague in 1956, received a Ph.D. in 1961, and a DrSc. in 1973.

== Career ==
Beginning in 1956, and continuing until his death, Šidák was a researcher in the mathematical department of the Czechoslovak Academy of Sciences and spent several years as head of the Department of Probability Theory and Mathematical Statistics.

During his life, Šidák held posts as a visiting faculty member at the Stockholm University, University of North Carolina, Moscow State University, Michigan State University, and others. He also served as chief editor of the scholarly journal Applications of Mathematics.

The Šidák correction, a method used to counteract the problem of multiple comparisons, was credited to a 1967 paper by Šidák.

== Personal life ==
In 1958 Šidák married Krista Štěpničková. They had two sons and a daughter.
