= Jenny Weleminsky =

Austrian translator and Esperantist (1882–1957)

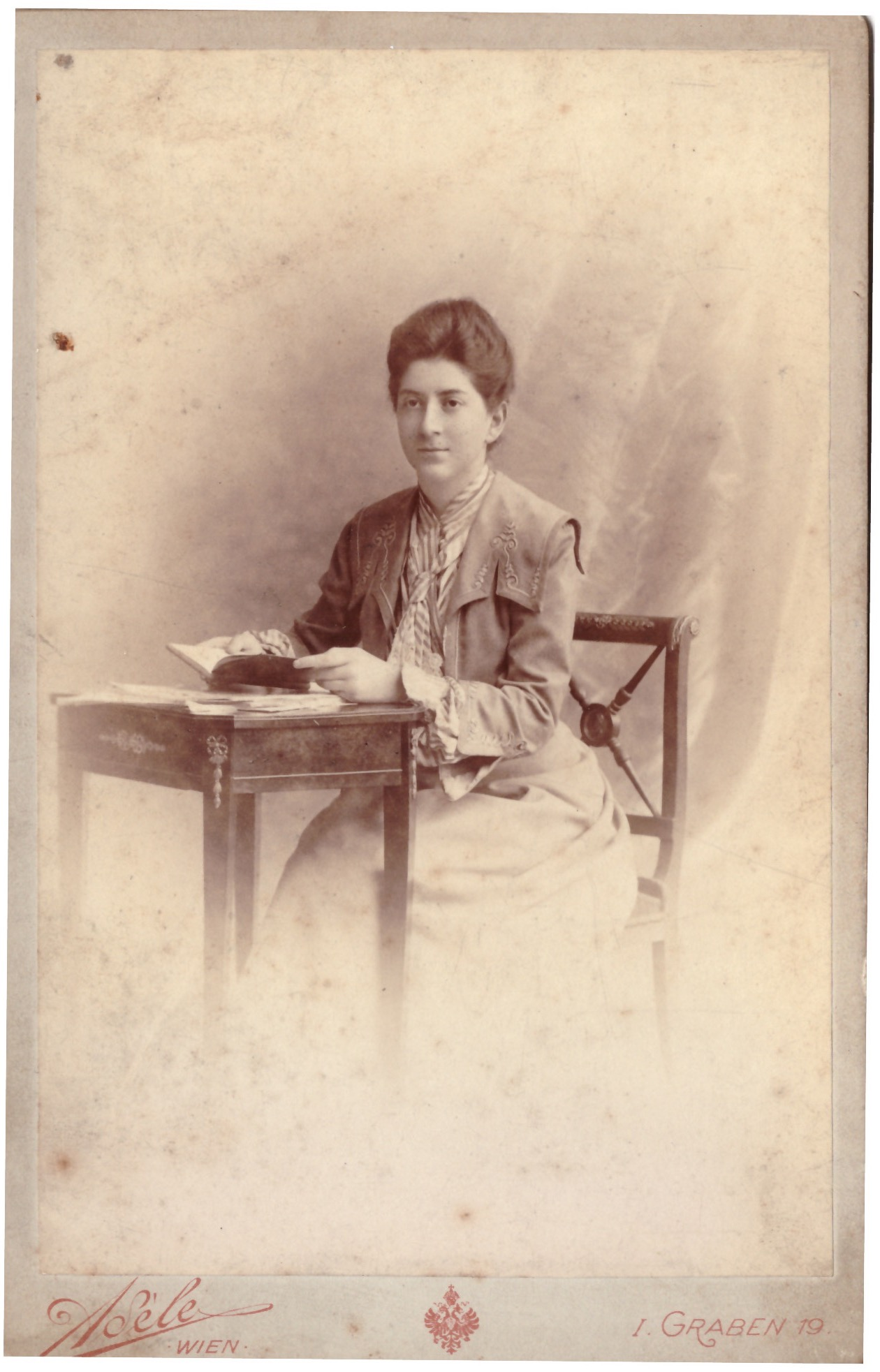
- Born: Jenny Elbogen; 12 June 1882; Schloss Thalheim, Lower Austria
- Died: 4 February 1957 (aged 74); London, England
- Occupations: Esperantist and translator
- Known for: Translations of works by Franz Grillparzer and other Austrian writers
- Movement: Budapeŝto skolo, the Budapest school of Esperanto literature
- Spouse: Friedrich ("Fritz") Weleminsky
- Children: Three daughters and one son
- Father: Guido Elbogen

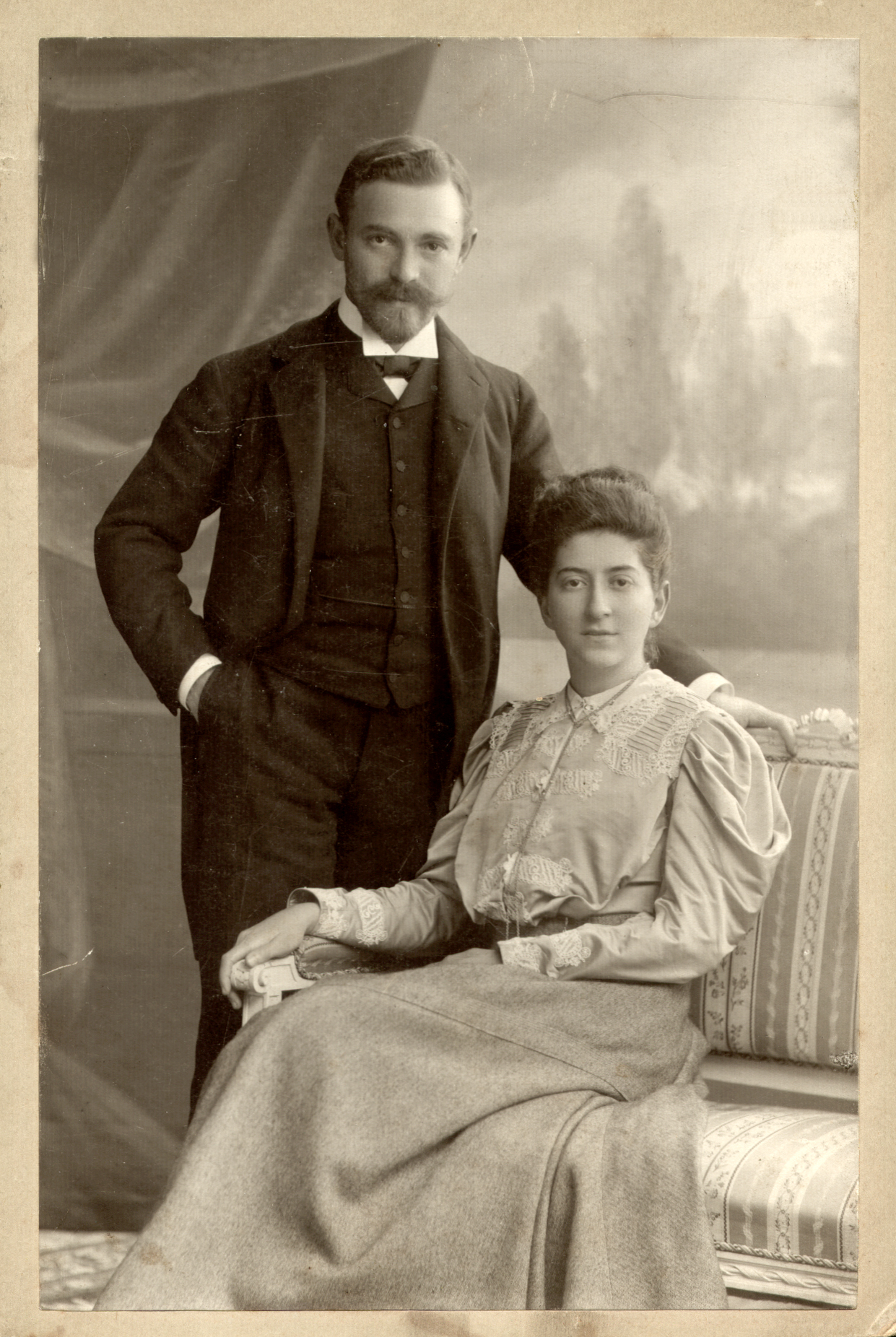
Portrait picture of Jenny Weleminsky and her husband Friedrich c. 1905–1910

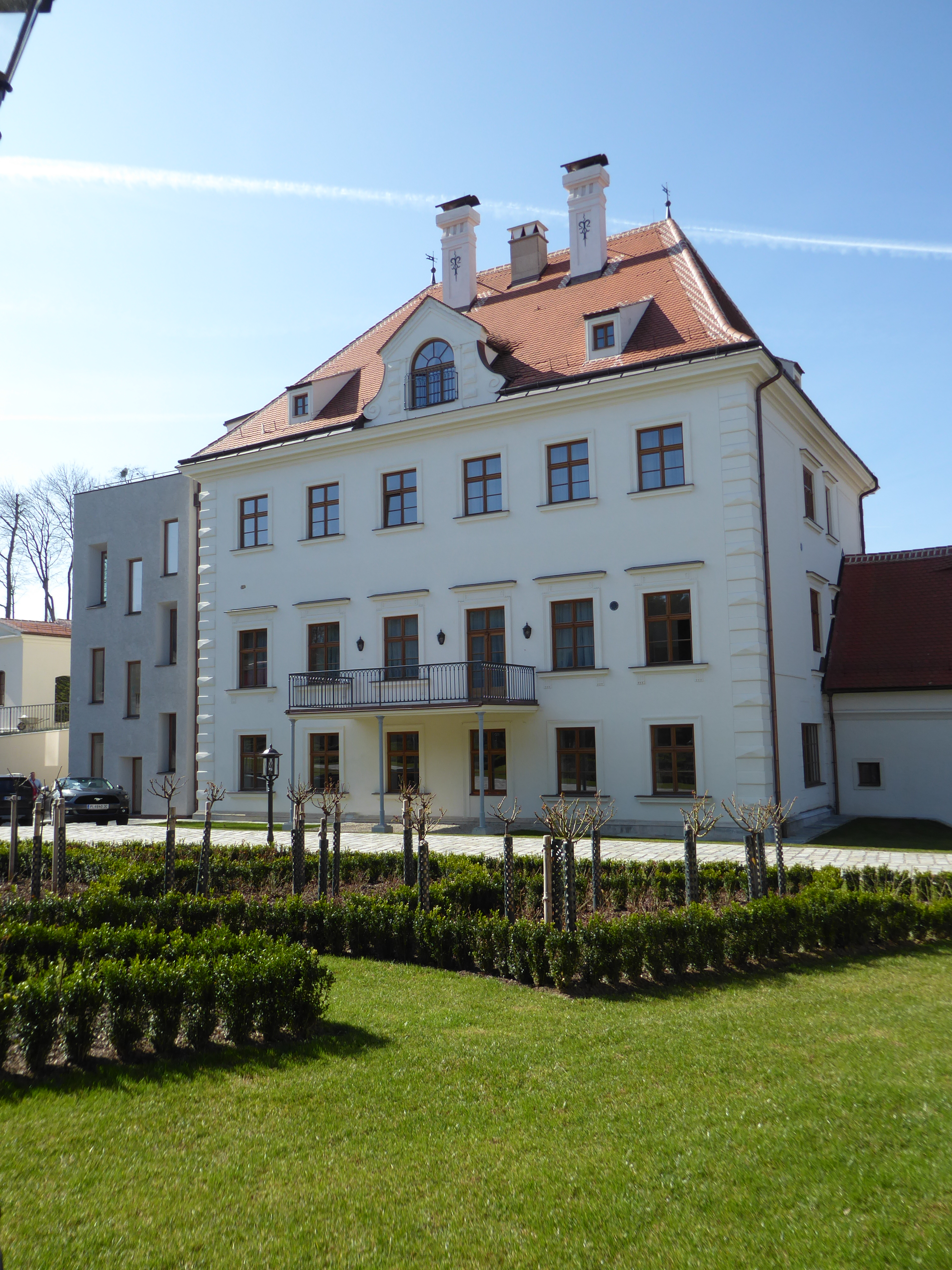
Schloss Thalheim, Kapelln

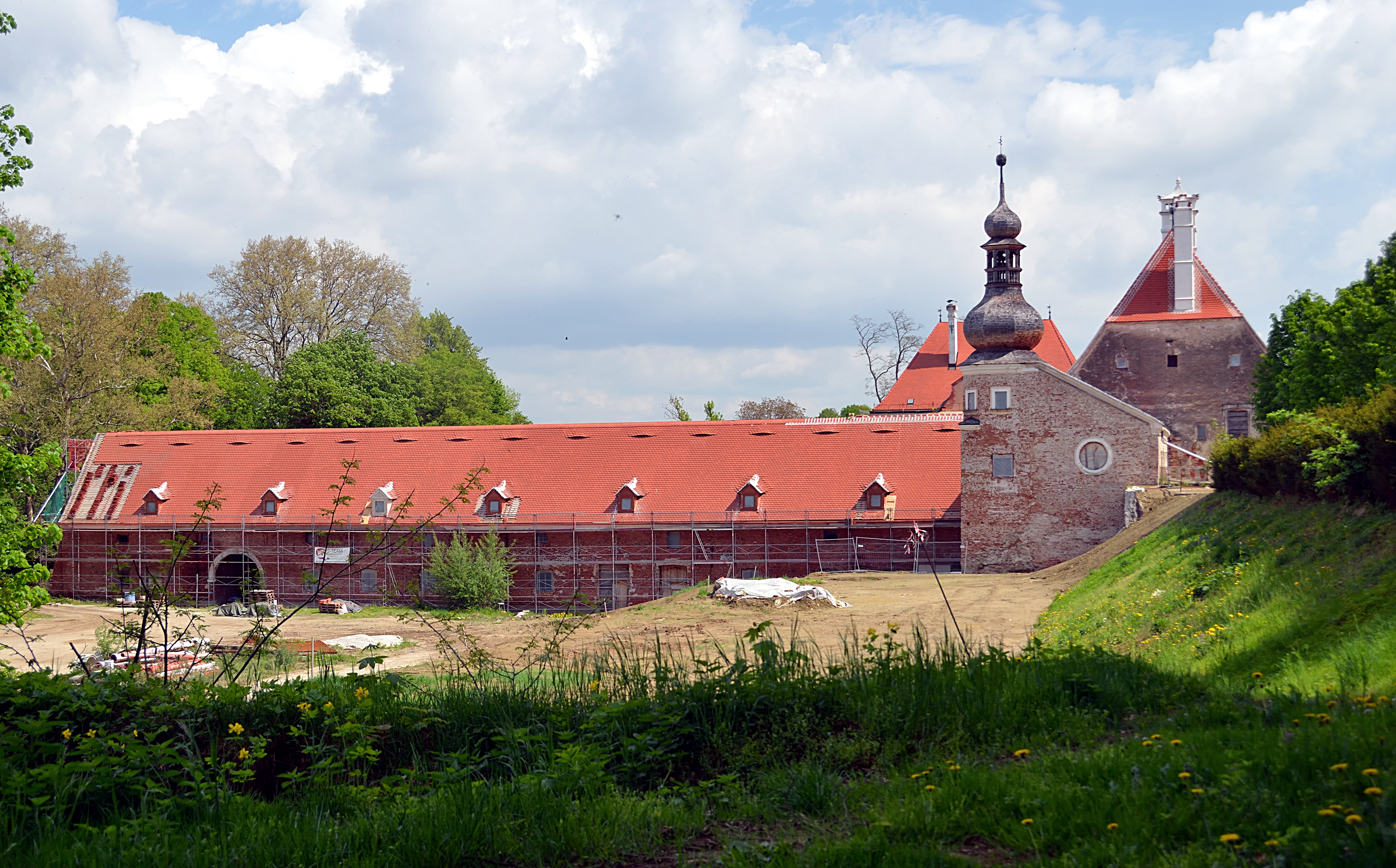
Schloss Thalheim under renovation in 2013

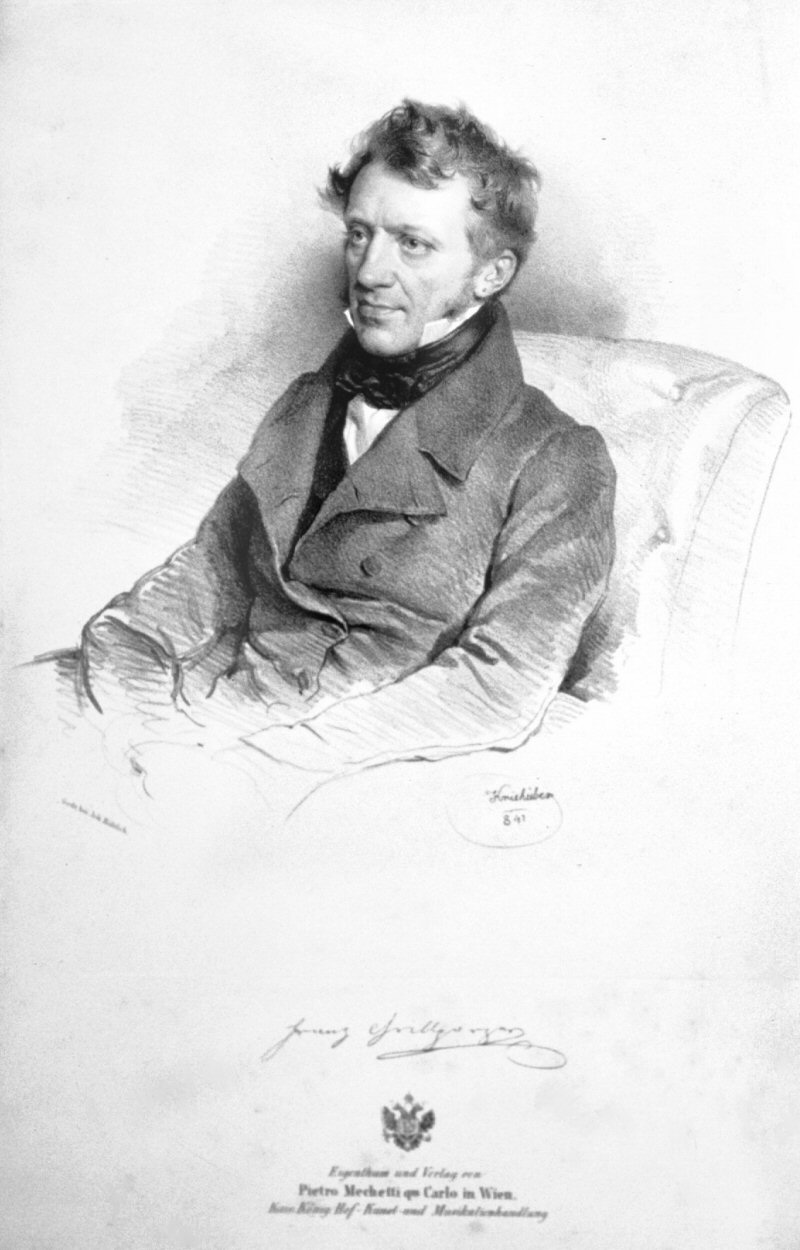
Jenny Weleminsky much admired Franz Grillparzer (1791–1872) – pictured here in an 1841 lithograph by Josef Kriehuber – who was regarded as the national poet of Austria.

Jenny Weleminsky (née Elbogen; 12 June 1882 – 4 February 1957) was a German-speaking Esperantist and translator who was born in Thalheim, Lower Austria, and brought up there and in Vienna. Some of her translations of works by Franz Grillparzer and other notable Austrian writers were published in the literary magazine Literatura Mondo (Literary World), which became home to an influential group of authors collectively known as Budapeŝto skolo, the Budapest school of Esperanto literature.

== Early life and education ==
Jenny Elbogen was born into a Jewish family on 12 June 1882 at Schloss Thalheim, (Note: Schloss Thalheim is in the village of Thalheim (Kapelln), today a part of Kapelln, Sankt Pölten-Land District; See de:Liste der denkmalgeschützten Objekte in Kapelln#Denkmäler, Jakob Prandtauer. After restoration it reopened in 2016 as a luxury hotel.) Lower Austria, the youngest child of Guido Elbogen, who became President of the Anglo-Austrian Bank in Vienna, and his wife Rosalie (Ali) (née Schwabacher), whom he married in 1868 in Paris. She had two sisters and a brother (Heinrich).

Jenny Elbogen was educated at home by a Miss Allen, a governess from Devon, England. She became sufficiently fluent in English to translate Axel Munthe's memoir The Story of San Michele from English to Esperanto for publication in 1935.

== Political views ==
Politically she had very determinate and fixed views, many inherited from her father. Jenny Elbogen was an ardent Habsburg monarchist and wished to see the Habsburg heir, Otto von Habsburg, restored to the Austrian throne after the Second World War. However, she was also an internationalist, as demonstrated by her enthusiasm for Esperanto. She opposed the Zionist movement's call for the establishment of a homeland for the Jewish people and ceased all contact with two of her daughters after they left Austria to live in Mandatory Palestine.

Her father, Guido Elbogen, had donated money towards the construction of a new synagogue (built in 1913) in Sankt Pölten.

== Marriage and family life ==
After her father died in 1918 she inherited Schloss Thalheim; her father had bought it in 1882 just before she was born. She lived there and in Prague (which until 1918 was part of Austria-Hungary) with her husband Friedrich ("Fritz") Weleminsky; they married at Schloss Thalheim on 4 December 1905. He was a lecturer in Hygiene (now called Microbiology) at the German University, Prague and developed tuberculomucin Weleminsky, a treatment for tuberculosis. The couple ran Schloss Thalheim as model dairy farm.

Facing Nazi persecution for being Jewish, they found sanctuary in 1939 in the United Kingdom where she continued to translate books into Esperanto, wrote poetry and taught English to other refugees.

After the Second World War and the death of her husband, Jenny Weleminsky spent several years in Vienna, returning eventually to London, where she died of breast cancer on 4 February 1957, aged 74. She donated her body to medical science and is buried in East Ham cemetery.

She and her husband had four children together. Two of their daughters emigrated in the early 1930s to Mandatory Palestine where they took new names – Eliesabeth (born 1909) became Jardenah, and Dorothea (born 1912) was known as Leah. Their eldest daughter, Marianne (born 1906), and their son, Anton (Note: Anton was referred to as "Antonin" in official Czech documents.) (born 1908), moved to Britain just before the Second World War.

== Publications ==
=== Translations from German ===
==== Novel ====
- Alexander Roda Roda, translated by Jenny Weleminsky (1936). "La ŝtona gasto" (PDF). Literatura Mondo: 91–95.

==== Play ====
- Franz Grillparzer, translated by Jenny Weleminsky. Sappho: tragedio en kvin aktoj, Vienna

==== Poetry ====
- Franz Grillparzer, translated by Jenny Weleminsky. Poemoj de Grillparzer (Poems of Grillparzer)
- Franz Grillparzer, translated by Jenny Weleminsky. "La ora felo: drama poemo en tri partoj"
- Franz Grillparzer, translated by Jenny Weleminsky. "La praavino: kvinakta tragedio", Vienna
- Franz Grillparzer, translated by Jenny Weleminsky. "La sonĝo kiel vivo: drama fabelo en kvar aktoj", Vienna
- Franz Grillparzer, translated by Jenny Weleminsky. "Hanibalo: fragmento el nefinita dramo", Vienna
- Franz Grillparzer: "Respondo", translated by Jenny Weleminsky (1936). "Austriaj Poetoj" (PDF). Literatura Mondo: 94.
- Anastasius Grün: "La epitafo", translated by Jenny Weleminsky (1936). "Austriaj Poetoj" (PDF). Literatura Mondo: 94.
- Friedrich Halm: "Kio estas amo?", translated by Jenny Weleminsky (1936). "Austriaj Poetoj" (PDF). Literatura Mondo: 94.
- Johann Gabriel Seidl: "La majstro kaj lia verko", translated by Jenny Weleminsky (1936). "Austriaj Poetoj" (PDF). Literatura Mondo: 94.

=== Translations from English ===
==== Novel ====
- Axel Munthe: Romano de San Michele (The Story of San Michele), translated by Jenny Weleminsky. Literatura Mondo, Budapest, 1935, 511pp.
