= Literatura Mondo =

Former Esperanto-language periodical

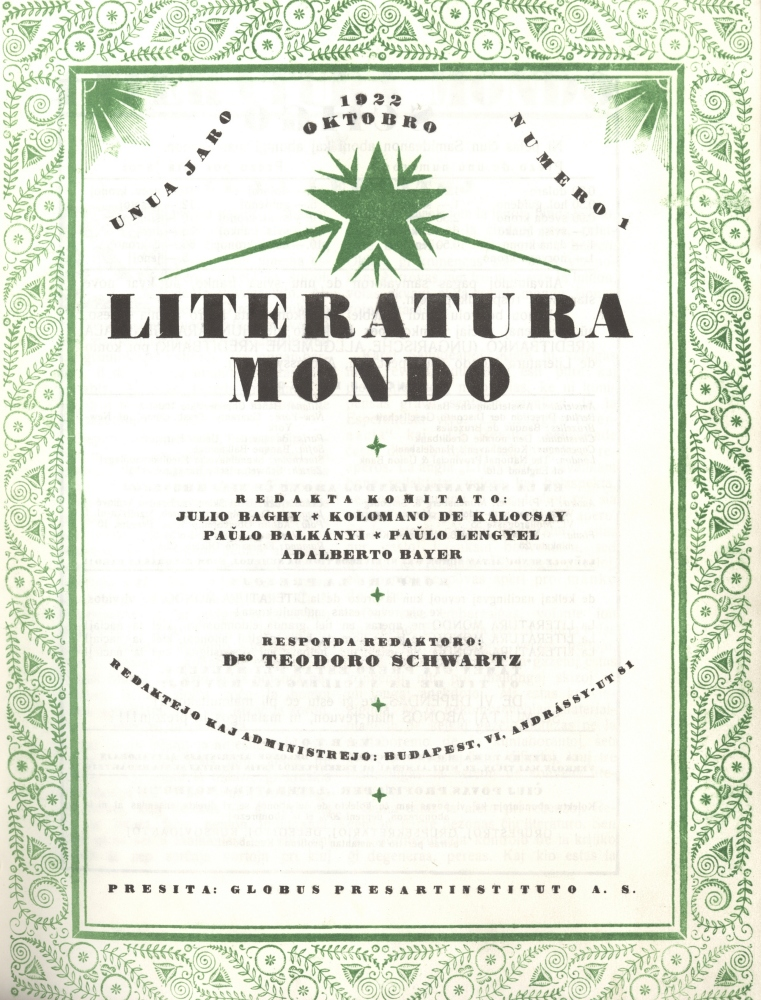
Cover page of the first issue

Literatura Mondo ('Literary World') was a literary Esperanto periodical and publishing house in Budapest, Hungary between 1922 and 1949. It became the focal point of the so-called Budapest School of Esperanto literature. It was founded by Tivadar Soros, father of the Hungarian-born American investor, billionaire and philanthropist George Soros.

== Journal ==
The journal Literatura Mondo first appeared in Budapest in 1922. Publication ceased in 1927 but was resumed in January 1931. After World War II, Literatura Mondo appeared again and was published for a further three years, from 1947 until 1949. In 1950, Literatura Mondo informed its subscribers that "due to financial obstacles, the publication of the magazine is no longer possible. In the year 1949 we have managed to produce four numbers [instead of the planned 6]."

The journal's editor from October 1922 to September 1924 was Theodor Schwarz (from 1936 known as Tivadar Soros) (Teodoro Ŝvarc in Esperanto). He was succeeded by Kálmán Kalocsay who, assisted by Julio Baghy, edited the journal during its three periods of publication.

== Publishing house ==
Literatura Mondo also published books. These included all the works of Kálmán Kalocsay, the original works of Stellan Engholm, the first original works in book form of Lajos Tárkony, Johan Weinhengst, Eugene Aisberg and Hendrik Adamson, and the Encyclopedia of Esperanto.
