= Kapelln =

- Municipality
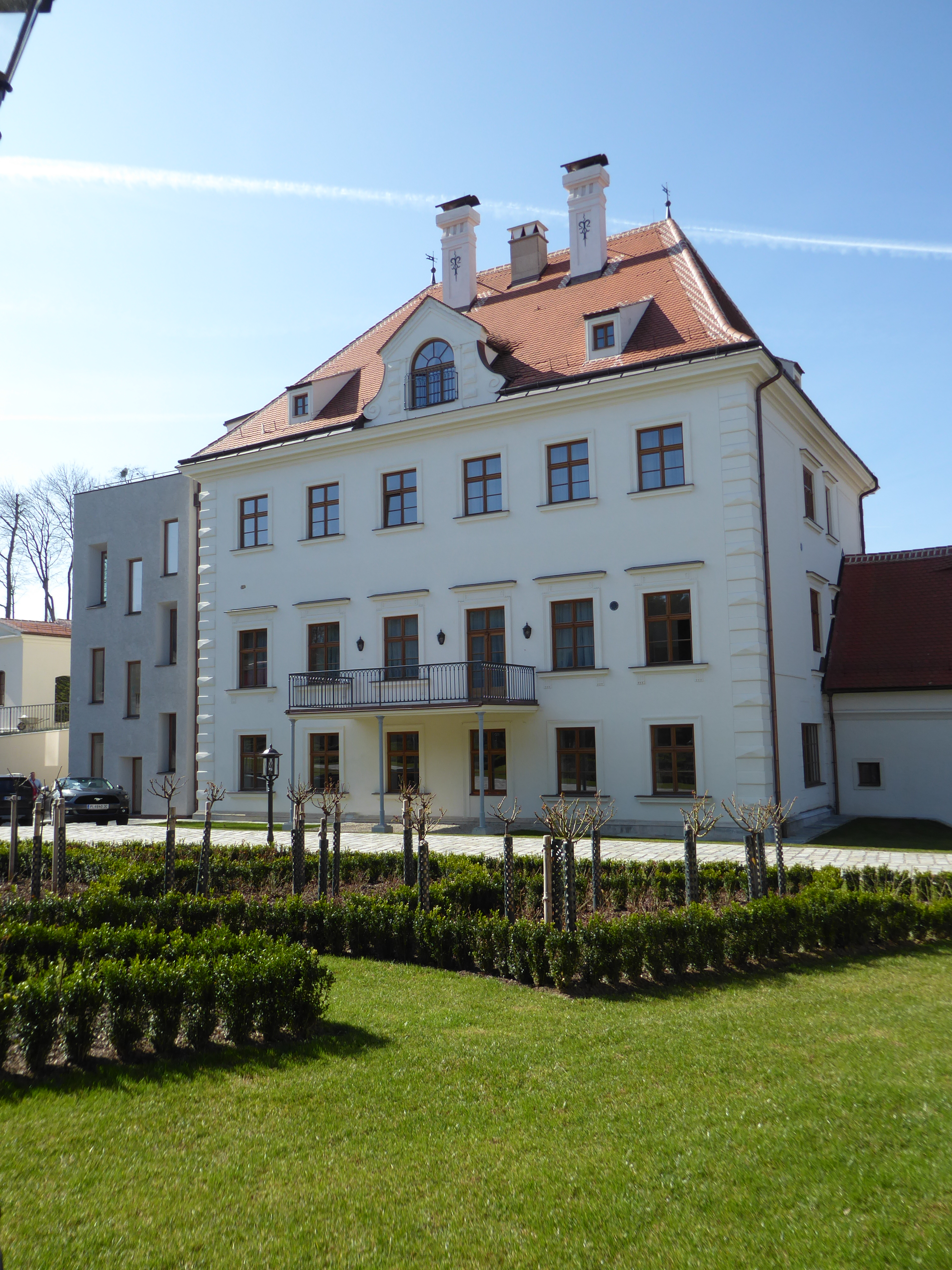
- Thalheim Castle

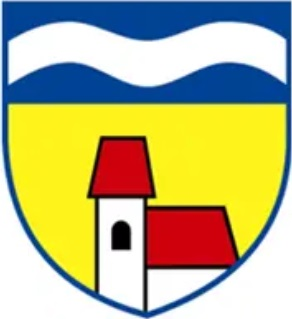
- Coat of arms

- Location within Austria
- Coordinates: 48°15′N 15°45′E
- Country: Austria
- State: Lower Austria
- District: Sankt Pölten-Land

Government
  - Mayor: Alois Vogl (ÖVP)

Area
  - Total: 20.19 km^{2} (7.80 sq mi)
- Elevation: 226 m (741 ft)

Population (2018-01-01)
  - Total: 1,381
  - Density: 68.40/km^{2} (177.2/sq mi)
- Time zone: UTC+1 (CET)
  - Summer (DST): UTC+2 (CEST)
- Postal code: 3141
- Area code: 02784
- Website: http://www.kapelln.at

Kapelln is a market municipality in the Sankt Pölten-Land district, Lower Austria, Austria. 10.29% of the municipality are forested. Kapelln is subdivided into the Katastralgemeinden Etzersdorf, Kapelln, Katzenberg, Mitterau, Mitterkilling, Oberkilling, Obermiesting, Pönning, Panzing, Rapoltendorf, Rassing, Thalheim, Unterau, Unterkilling and Untermiesting. There are 102 agricultural companies, and 586 jobs.

== Population ==
Historical population
Year	Pop.	±%
1971	1,086	—
1981	1,079	−0.6%
1991	1,125	+4.3%
2001	1,280	+13.8%
2011	1,360	+6.2%
