= Bray (surname) =

Bray is a surname. Notable people with the surname include:

== A ==
- Alan Bray (1948–2001), British historian and activist
- Alan Bray (sport shooter) (1929–2016), British sports shooter
- Alan Edward Bray (born 1942), Australian vascular surgeon
- Alanna Bray-Lougheed (born 1993), Canadian sprint kayaker
- Alastair Bray (born 1993), Australian association footballer
- Alex Bray (born 1995), British footballer
- Andy Bray (born 1981), English cricketer
- Angie Bray, Baroness Bray of Coln (born 1953), British politician and life peer
- Anna Eliza Bray (1790–1883), English historical novelist and writer
- Anne Bray, American artist
- Archie Wilmotte Leslie Bray (1883–1942), English-American educator

== B ==
- Barbara Bray (1924–2010), English translator and critic
- Bill Bray (born 1983), American baseball player
- Bill Bray (bodyguard) (1925–2005), American security detail officer
- Bill Bray (rugby league) (1917–1988), Australian rugby league footballer
- Billy Bray (1794–1868), British preacher
- Bob Bray (1919–2006), American water polo player
- Buster Bray (1913-1982), American baseball player

== C ==
- Caoimhe Bray (born 2009), Australian cricketer
- Caroline Bray (1814–1905), British writer
- Carys Bray (born 1975), British novelist
- Charles Bray (1811–1884), British industrialist and philanthropist
- Charlie Bray (cricketer) (1898–1993), English cricketer and journalist
- Charles Bray (glass artist) (1922–2012), British artist
- Charlie Bray (gridiron football) (born 1945), American gridiron football player
- Charlotte Bray (born 1982), British composer
- Christopher A. Bray (born 1955), American businessman and politician from Vermont
- Claude A. Bray Jr. (1931–2020), American politician from Georgia
- Connor Bray (born 2003), British figure skater
- Curtis Bray (1970–2014), American football player and coach

== D ==
- Daniel Bray (1751–1819), Continental Army officer
- David Kaonohiokala Bray (1889–1968), Hawaiian kahuna
- Deanne Bray (born 1971), American actress
- Denis Bray (1926–2005), Hong Kong civil servant
- Dennis Bray (born 1939), British biologist
- Denys Bray (1875–1951), British colonial civil servant and etymologist
- Dorothy Bray, Baroness Chandos (c.1524–1605), English noblewoman and courtier
- Duane Bray (born 1954), Canadian ice hockey player

== E ==
- Ed Bray (born 1910), Australian rules footballer
- Edmund Bray (1686–1725), English politician
- Edward Bray (died 1581) (c.1519–1581), English Member of Parliament
- Edward Bray (businessman) (1874–1950), English businessman and cricketer
- Edward Bray (judge) (1849–1926), English judge and cricketer
- Edward Atkyns Bray (1778–1857), British Anglican priest and poet
- Elaine Bray (1940–1998), Australian cricketer

== G ==
- Geoff Bray (born 1951), English footballer
- George Bray (1918–2002), English footballer
- George A. Bray (born 1931), American obesity researcher
- Gerald Bray (born 1948), British theologian
- Gertrude Bray (1906–1992), British architect and politician
- Glenn Bray (born 1948), American collector
- Gordon Bray (born 1949), Australian sports commentator
- Graham Bray (born 1953), English rugby league footballer

== H ==
- Harold Bray (1920–1999), Australian rules footballer
- Harold Bray (sailor) (born 1927), American sailor and police officer
- Helen Bray (1889–1990), American actress
- Henry Bray (footballer) (1891–1966), Australian rules footballer
- Henry Truro Bray (1846–1922), English-American Episcopal priest, philosopher and homeopath
- Hiawatha Bray, American journalist
- Hubert Bray, American mathematician and physicist

== I ==
- Ian Bray (born 1962), Welsh footballer

== J ==
- Jack Bray (Australian footballer) (1916–1982), Australian rules footballer
- Jack Bray (footballer, born 2007) (born 2007), English footballer
- Jackie Bray (1909–1982), English footballer
- James Bray (baseball) (1898-1931), American baseball player
- James Bray (cricketer, born 1790) (1790–1869), English cricketer
- James Bray (cricketer, born 1853) (1853–1898), English cricketer
- James Bray (councillor) (1609–1691), English merchant and politician in Virginia
- James Bray Jr. (died 1725), Virginian politician
- James H. Bray (born 1954), American psychologist
- James Albert Bray (1870–1944), American Methodist bishop and college president
- Jason Bray (born 1969), Welsh Anglican priest
- Jeff Bray (footballer) (1938–2006), Australian rules footballer
- Jeff Bray (politician) (born 1964), Canadian politician from British Columbia
- Jeremy Bray (1930–2002), British politician
- Jeremy Bray (cricketer) (born 1973), Irish cricketer and coach
- Jim Bray (born 1961), American artistic roller skater
- Joan Bray (born 1945), American politician
- Jocelyn Bray (1880–1964), British surveyor
- Joe Bray (1886–1955), Australian rules footballer
- John Bray (athlete) (1875–1945), American athlete
- John Bray (boxer) (born 1970), American boxer
- John Bray (physician), English physician and botanist of the 14th century
- John Bray (communications engineer) (1911–2004), British engineer
- John Bray (composer) (1782–1822), composer of music for The Indian Princess
- John Bray (cricketer) (1938–2025), New Zealand cricketer
- John Bray (footballer) (1937–1992), English footballer
- John Bray (rugby league) (born 1941), New Zealand rugby league footballer and administrator
- John Cox Bray (1842–1894), Australian politician
- John Francis Bray (1809–1897), American radical social economist
- John Jefferson Bray (1912–1995), Australian judge
- John Randolph Bray (1879–1978), American animator
- J. Roger Bray (John Roger Bray; 1929–2018), American ecologist
- Josh Bray (politician) (born 1985), American politician from Kentucky
- Josh Bray (singer-songwriter), English folk blues singer-songwriter
- Joshua Bray (1838–1918), New South Wales colonist
- Julia Bray (born 1952), British orientalist
- Juliane Bray (born 1975), New Zealand snowboarder

== K ==
- Katie Bray (born 1987), English mezzo-soprano
- Keith Bray (born 2006), Scottish footballer
- Ken Bray (born 1937), Australian rugby league footballer
- Kenneth Bray, British engineer and academic
- Kenneth A. Bray (1879–1953), American Episcopal Church priest and sports coach
- Kevin Bray (cricketer) (born 1968), Australian cricketer
- Kevin Bray (director), American film director

== L ==
- Lane Bray (1928–2015), American politician from Washington State
- Leslie Bray (1895–1957), English Royal Air Force officer and cricketer
- Libba Bray (born 1964), American writer
- Linda L. Bray (born 1960), US Army officer
- Lourinda Bray (1946–2024, American restoration artist and historian

== M ==
- Mahdi Bray (1950–2024), American activist
- Maria Bray (1828–1921), American lighthouse keeper and phycologist
- Mark Bray, Hong Kong academic
- Mark Bray (historian), American academic and activist
- Marthe Bray (1884–1949), French suffragist
- Maury Bray (1909–1966), American football player
- Massimo Bray (born 1959), Italian intellectual and politician
- Michael Bray, American minister and serial bomber
- M. William Bray (Michael William Bray; 1889–1961), American politician
- Molly S. Bray, American geneticist

== N ==
- Nick Bray, RAF officer

== O ==
- Count Otto von Bray-Steinburg (1807–1899, Bavarian diplomat and politician

== P ==
- Patricia Bray, American romance and fantasy writer
- Peter Bray (born 1957), British kayaker
- Phyllis Bray (1911-1991), English painter

== Q ==
- Quan Bray (born 1993), American gridiron football player

== R ==
- Ray Bray (1917–1996), American football player
- Reginald Bray (c.1440–1503), English administrator
- Reginald Bray (politician) (1869–1950), British local politician
- Reginald More Bray (1842–1923), English judge
- Richard Bray (born 1934), American politician from Indiana
- Richie Bray (died 2017), Australian rules footballer
- Robert Bray (1917–1983), American film and television actor
- Robert Bray (British Army officer) (1908–1983), British Army general
- Robert Bray (politician), Irish Member of Parliament of the 18th century
- R. C. Bray (born 1977), American producer and voice actor
- Rodric Bray (born 1969), American politician from Indiana
- Roger Ernest Bray (1875–1952), Canadian socialist
- Ronald Bray (1922–1984), British politician
- Russ Bray (born 1957), English darts referee

== S ==
- Sophie Bray (born 1990), English field hockey player
- Stephen Bray (born 1956), American musician
- Stephen Bray (Gaelic footballer) (born 1982), Irish Gaelic footballer
- Steve Bray (born 1969), British anti-Brexit activist
- Susan Bray (born 1967), Irish cricketer

== T ==
- Thom Bray, American actor and writer
- Thomas Bray (died 1730), English Anglican priest in colonial Maryland
- Thomas Bray (bishop) (1749–1820), Irish Roman Catholic archbishop
- Thomas Bray (canon) (1706–1785), British Anglican priest
- Thomas J. Bray (1867−1933), American engineer and steel company president
- T. J. Bray (born 1992), American basketball player
- Tim Bray (born 1955), Canadian software developer
- Tom Bray (fl.1850–1890), American saloon keeper and underworld figure
- Trent Bray (American football) (born 1982), American football player and coach
- Trent Bray (swimmer) (born 1973), New Zealand swimmer
- Tyler Bray (born 1991), American football player

== V ==
- Victor Bray, Australian dragster driver

== W ==
- William Bray (antiquary) (1736–1832), English antiquarian
- William Bray (cricketer) (1879–1960), New Zealand cricketer
- William Bray (priest) (died 1644), English Anglican priest
- William Bray (MP) (1682–1720), British Army officer and politician
- William C. Bray (1879–1946), Canadian-American chemist
- William F. Bray (1877–c. 1960), Arizona architect, designer of Oddfellows Home (Safford, Arizona)
- William G. Bray (1903–1979), American politician
- William L. Bray (1865–1953), American academic
- William M. Bray (1880–1964), American politician from Wisconsin
- W. Reginald Bray (1879–1939), British autograph collector

== See also ==
- de Bray (surname)
- Braye (surname)
