= James Bray =

James Bray may refer to:

- James Bray (cricketer, born 1790) (1790–1869), Kent and Sussex cricketer
- James Bray (cricketer, born 1853) (1853–1898), Kent cricketer
- James Bray (baseball) (1898–1931), American Negro league baseball player
- James Bray, American World War II combat cameraman trained at the First Motion Picture Unit
- James H. Bray (born 1954), past president of the American Psychological Association
- James Bray (councillor) (c. 1630–1691), politician, attorney and planter in colonial Virginia
- James Bray Jr. (c. 1670–1725), merchant, planter, and politician in the Colony of Virginia
