= Hennell =

The Hennell family is a family of prominent silver-smiths and writers in Southern England. The family is possibly of Huguenot origin, and has traditionally held dissenting religious and Liberal political convictions. All members can be traced back to David Hennell (1712-1785), who founded the silver-smith dynasty, and include:

- Henry Hennell FRS (c.1797–1842), chemist
- Hennell (1817 cricketer) (fl. 1817), English first-class cricketer for Marylebone Cricket Club
- Colonel Samuel Hennell (1800-1880), Indian Army officer and Colonial Office administrator
- Mary Hennell (1802–1843), writer
- Charles Christian Hennell (1809–1850), merchant and Unitarian apologist
- Sara Hennell (1812–1899), writer
- Caroline Hennell, known as Cara Bray, (1814–1905), writer and wife of Charles Bray
- Thomas Hennell (1903–1945), artist and writer
- Professor Michael Hennell (born 1940), leading computer scientist
- Andrew Hennell (born 1958), specialist purveyor of 17th century and earlier furniture and antiquities
