= William Bray =

William or Bill Bray may refer to:

== Politicians ==
- William Bray (MP) (1682–1720), member of parliament for Monmouth Boroughs
- William M. Bray (1880–1964), Wisconsin State Senator
- M. William Bray (1889–1961), U.S. politician, Lieutenant Governor of New York 1933–1938
- William G. Bray (1903–1979), U.S. politician, Representative for Indiana

== Sports ==
- William Bray (cricketer) (1879–1960), New Zealand cricketer
- Bill Bray (rugby league) (fl. 1946–1948), Australian rugby league player
- Bill Bray (born 1983), American baseball pitcher

== Others ==
- William Bray (priest) (fl. 1613–1644), English clergyman
- William Bray (antiquary) (1736–1832), English antiquary
- Billy Bray (1794–1868), Welsh Methodist evangelist
- William F. Bray (1877–c. 1960), Arizona architect, designer of Oddfellows Home (Safford, Arizona)
- William L. Bray (1865–1953), American botanist
- John Bray (communications engineer) (William John Bray, 1911–2004), British communications engine
- Bill Bray (bodyguard) (1925–2005), American bodyguard
