= Charlie Bray =

Charlie Bray may refer to:

- Charlie Bray (cricketer) (1898–1993), English cricketer
- Charlie Bray (gridiron football) (born 1945), American-born Canadian football player

== See also ==
- Charles Bray (1811–1884), British ribbon manufacturer, social reformer and phrenologist
- Charles Bray (glass artist) (1922–2012), British painter and glass sculptor
