= Henry Bray =

Henry Bray may refer to:

- Henry Bray (footballer) (1891–1966), Australian rules footballer
- Henry Truro Bray (1846–1922), English-American priest, philosopher and physician
