= Jack Bray =

Jack Bray may refer to:

- Jackie Bray (1909–1982), English footballer
- Jack Bray (Australian footballer) (1916–1982), Australian rules footballer
- Jack Bray (footballer, born 2007), English footballer

== See also ==
- John Bray (disambiguation)
