= Edward Bray =

Edward Bray(e) may refer to:

- Edward Atkyns Bray (1778–1857), British poet, vicar, and miscellaneous writer
- Edward Braye or Bray (died 1558), Member of Parliament (MP) for Lewes and Surrey
- Edward Bray (died 1581) (1519–1581), MP for Helston
- Edward Bray (Middlesex cricketer) (1874–1950)
- Edward Bray (Surrey cricketer) (1849–1926)
