= De Bray (surname) =

de Bray is a surname, and may refer to:

- Dirck de Bray (c.1635–1694), Dutch painter, son of Salomon de Bray
- Guillaume de Bray (died 1282), French cardinal, poet and mathematician
- Jan de Bray (c.1627–1697), Dutch painter, son of Salomon de Bray
- Joseph de Bray (1630–1664), Dutch painter, son of Salomon de Bray
- Salomon de Bray (1597–1664), Dutch painter and architect
- Stephen de Bray (died 1440/1), Irish judge
- Yvonne de Bray (1889–1954), French actress

== See also ==
- Debray
- Dubray
- Bray (surname)
