= Debray =

Debray is a surname. Notable people with the name include:

- Cécile Debray (born 1966), French museum director, art historian and curator
- Elisabeth Burgos-Debray (born 1941), Venezuelan anthropologist
- Jules Henri Debray (1827–1888), French chemist
- Laurence Debray (born 1976), French writer
- Michel Debray (born 1936), French admiral and politician
- Patrice Debray (born 1951), member of the National Assembly of France
- Pierre Debray-Ritzen (1922–1993), French psychiatrist
- Régis Debray (born 1940), French philosopher, journalist, academic
- Santosh Debray, Indian politician from West Bengal
- Tony Debray (born 1989), French male canoeist
- Xavier Debray (1818–1895), American soldier and diplomat

== See also ==
- de Bray (surname)
- See You at Regis Debray, 2005 film
