= Kevin Bray =

Kevin Bray may refer to:

- Kevin Bray (director), American film, television, commercial and music video director and producer
- Kevin Bray (cricketer) (born 1968), former Australian cricketer
