= Leyton Cricket Ground =

Cricket ground in Leyton, London

Coordinates: 51°34′02″N 0°00′39″W

County Ground
- Leyton High Road Youth Sports Ground, Lyttelton Ground, Metropolitan Police Ground
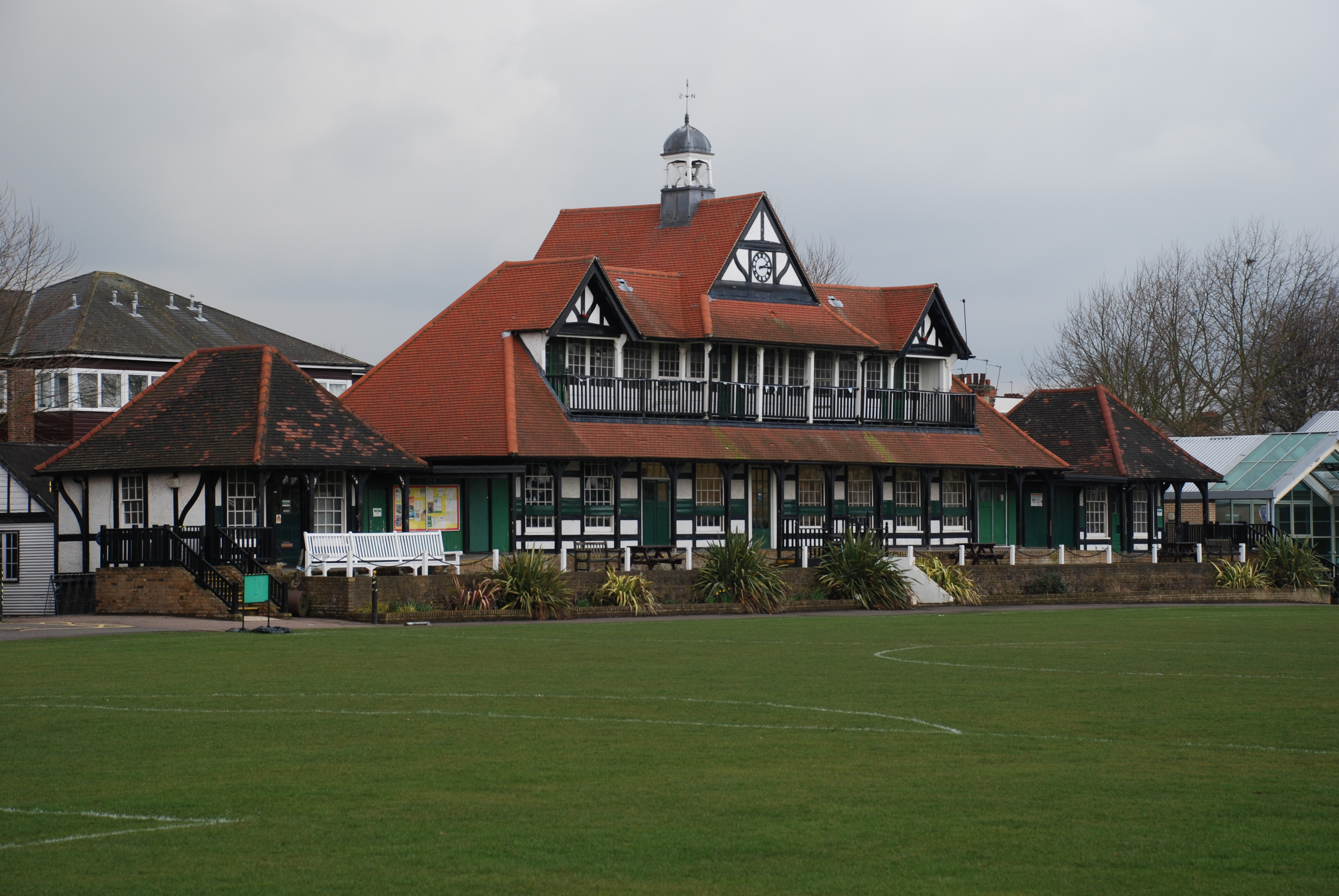
- Interactive map of County Ground

Ground information
- Location: Leyton, London
- Country: England
- Establishment: 1885
- Capacity: 8,000

Team information
Essex	(1886–1977)
- As of 7 October 2009; Source: Ground profile

Leyton Cricket Ground (formerly known as the County Ground or the Lyttelton Ground) is a cricket ground in Leyton, London. The ground was the headquarters and main home match venue of Essex County Cricket Club from 1886 until 1933, and was also used by the club for matches between 1957 and 1977. It currently hosts club and community cricket matches and has a listed pavilion.

== Cricket ground ==
The ground has been used for cricket since the early 19th century. In 1884 or early 1885, architect Richard Creed laid out the ground and designed the pavilion. Essex County Cricket Club played their first game there on 15 and 16 June 1885 against Surrey; the game was lost by an innings. The captain of Essex, Charles Ernest Green, became convinced that the club's headquarters ground at Brentwood was too small and isolated and he drove the campaign to acquire the Leyton ground. In 1886, the club purchased the ground from its owner, the cricket-loving Lord Lyttelton, at a "favourable" price of £12,000. An appeal was launched for £3,500 for the construction of a pavilion, other necessary buildings and "general alterations". Lord Lyttelton was the first donor, contributing £200. Initially known as the "Lyttelton Ground", a local newspaper report claimed that the development of the site "gave unwonted loveliness to a district which but a short while since presented an appearance of the abomination of desolation", since the surrounding area had been sold off for the construction of new housing and a railway line. Although £2,900 had been raised by the appeal, the purchase of the Leyton Cricket Ground left the club in financial difficulty for decades. In March 1918, a British tank nicknamed "Julian" was exhibited at the ground as part of a campaign to sell war bonds.

In 1921, the ground was sold to the Army Sports Central Board, relieving the club of a £10,000 mortgage. Leyton Cricket Ground remained the headquarters of Essex County Cricket Club until 1933, when the club relinquished its lease. In 1931 the club had looked into the possibly of buying the ground again and launched an appeal for funds to help with the purchase, but by the end of the 1932 season Essex's poor financial situation led to the plan being dropped and the decision was made to remove the county's headquarters from Leyton. In 1933 Essex gave up the lease on Leyton, moved its headquarters to Chelmsford and commenced playing matches at a variety of venues around the county. Essex returned to play matches at Leyton in 1957, by then owned by the local council, and continued to play there until 1977, when Trevor Bailey described Leyton as “our ugliest ground… but it had a certain gnarled charm”. Charles Bray, who played for and captained Essex at Leyton, took a similar view of the ground in his history of the Essex club - "It certainly did not have beauty or charm....on a cheerless day it was a miserable place. Yet it had a character of its own and had been the stage for a great number of magnificent games."

The ground is now used for National Cricket League matches during the season, and hosts teams including Waltham Forest Cricket Club. The wooden pavilion building still stands and has been a Grade II listed building since 1999. The site is protected by Fields in Trust through a legal "Deed of Dedication" safeguarding the future of the space as public recreation land for future generations to enjoy. In April 2017, former Essex and England captain Graham Gooch opened new cricket facilities at the Leyton ground, including outdoor cricket nets and a non-turf pitch (NTP). In 2019, it was announced that Waltham Forest Borough Council and the England and Wales Cricket Board (ECB) were jointly investing £900,000 to improve the site for cricket use, part of the ECB’s South Asian Action Plan which aims to engage the British Asian community in the sport, as a result of which, a covered Urban Cricket Centre was opened at the ground in June 2019 by Graham Gooch. In 2021, Waltham Forest Borough Council announced a restoration plan for the pavilion after it appeared on the Heritage at Risk Register.

== Notable matches at Leyton ==
Essex played their first county match at the Leyton ground on 15 and 16 June 1885 against Surrey. Surrey won by an innings, with Walter Read scoring 214. Essex were not a first-class county at the time and the match did not carry first-class status. The match appears to have justified Essex's adoption of the Leyton ground; in the magazine Cricket, Charles W. Alcock reported that "the Essex authorities were quite satisfied with the attendance". Essex were granted first-class status for the 1894 season and their inaugural first-class match was played at Leyton from 14 to 16 May 1894, against Leicestershire. The visitors won by 68 runs. For the 1895 season Essex were admitted to the County Championship and the inaugural Championship game at Leyton resulted in a loss to Middlesex by five wickets. In the following game Harry Pickett took all 10 wickets in Leicestershire’s innings, a performance which remains the best innings bowling figures for Essex as of 2025.

In 1899 the Leyton ground was the venue for Essex’s first victory over an Australia touring team. The county led by 55 runs after the first innings and Australia had to chase a target of 200 to win on the final day of the game, but were bowled out for 73. Two years later, the county marked a less auspicious occasion at Leyton when they were bowled out by Yorkshire for 30, which remained their lowest first-class score until 2013. In June 1905 Essex recorded a second victory over Australia at Leyton. In a low-scoring game, Essex won by 19 runs with Claude Buckenham taking 12 wickets in the match, which was the only loss by the 1905 Australia team to a county team. In 1906 Leyton was the venue for another Essex victory over an international team, the 1906 West Indies touring side.

Essex's next win over an international team at Leyton in took place 1927, when they beat the New Zealand tourists, but more significantly the game featured the first broadcast commentary of a cricket match. The BBC covered the first day with short periods of commentary during the afternoon and a summary at 6.45pm. The commentator was a former Essex player, Frank Gillingham, who sat on the pavilion balcony so that crowd noise could be picked up by his microphone.

In June 1932 Herbert Sutcliffe and Percy Holmes of Yorkshire made a world record first-class partnership for any wicket of 555 at Leyton. There was some controversy about the record, when Sutcliffe was dismissed with the total on 555, after which the Leyton scoreboard moved the total back to 554, meaning that the partnership had only equalled the previous record. After discussion between the Essex captain, Charles Bray, and the scorers Billy Ringrose and Charlie McGahey, the total was amended back to 555. Bray asked McGahey to ensure that a run was added to bring the total to the record-breaking figure, but later admitted that he was wrong and shouldn't have allowed the change. This remained the record for any wicket till 1945–46, and it was not until the 1976–77 season in Pakistan that it was beaten for the first wicket. As of 2025 it remains the partnership record for any wicket made in England.

- 1962: Essex beat Pakistan by nine wickets.
- 1970: Essex held Jamaica to a draw.
- 1977: Essex beat Glamorgan, the last first-class match at Leyton.

== Other uses ==
The ground has also been used for football. Millwall Rovers played London Caledonians at the ground in the East London FA Cup Final in 1886. The game finished 2–2 and both teams shared the cup for six months each. The Old Etonians F.C. used the ground to host major matches in the early 1890s, including FA Cup ties. In 1895 Woolwich Arsenal played a Football League Second Division game against Leicester Fosse as their own Manor Ground was closed by the Football League following crowd trouble. Leyton also occasionally played there at the ground, prior to moving to Osborne Road.

A building at the ground is used by Leyton Amateur Boxing Club and an arts block and a sports hall are used by George Mitchell School and other community groups.
