= Braye (surname) =

Braye is a surname, and may refer to:

- Anne Braye, Baroness Cobham (1501–1558), English noblewoman, daughter of Edmund Braye
- Dominique Braye (born 1947), French politician
- Edmund Braye, 1st Baron Braye (c.1484–1539), English nobleman
- Edward Braye (died 1558), English Member of Parliament
- John Braye, 2nd Baron Braye (died 1557), English nobleman

== See also ==
- Bray (surname)
