= Dubray =

Dubray may refer to:

== People ==
- Charlotte Dubray (1854–1931), French sculptor
- Juanita Suazo Dubray (born 1930), Native American potter
- Lionel Dubray (1923–1944), member of French Resistance during World War II

== Other ==
- Henry-Dubray, French automobile
