= Reginald More Bray =

English judge (1842–1923)

Sir Reginald More Bray
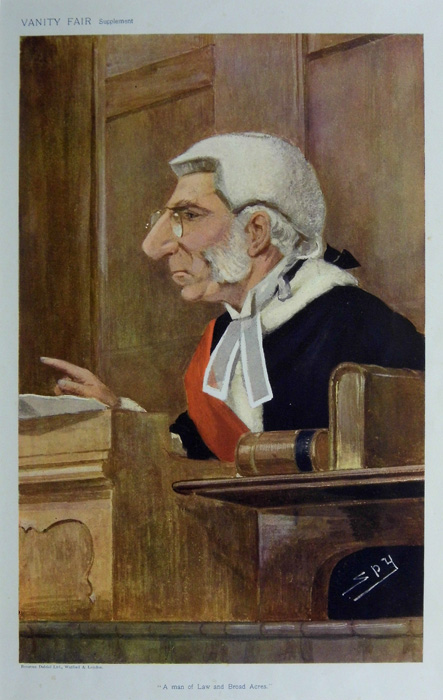
- "A man of Law and Broad Acres", caricature of Mr Justice Bray by "Spy", 1906

Justice of the High Court
- In office 13 June 1904 – 22 March 1923

Personal details
- Born: 26 September 1842
- Died: 22 March 1923 (aged 80) Kensington, London
- Children: 8
- Education: Trinity College, Cambridge

Sir Reginald More Bray (26 September 1842 – 22 March 1923) was an English High Court judge.

== Biography ==
Reginald More Bray was the elder son and heir of Reginald Bray, JP, FSA, of Shere, Surrey, and of Frances Bray, née Longman, of the publishing family. The Bray family was one of the oldest in England, being able to trace its descent from the time of the Conquest. The manor of Shere, whose lordship Bray inherited from his father, was first granted to Sir Reginald Bray by Henry VII and has been in the family ever since. Among his ancestors were Sir Thomas More, in whose honour he received his middle name, while his paternal grandmother was a sister of the political economist the Rev Thomas Malthus. A man with strong local connections, Bray was appointed Deputy Lieutenant of Surrey in 1902.

After attending Harrow School, Bray went up to Trinity College, Cambridge as a scholar, graduating as twelfth wrangler 1865. A pupil of Wakin Williams, he was called to the Bar at the Inner Temple in 1868. He then joined the South-Eastern Circuit, and for several years 'devilled for J. P. Murphy QC. He built a "substantial, if not a commanding" common law practice, He became Recorder of Guildford and a bencher of the Inner Temple in 1891, and a Queen's Counsel in 1897, after an unusually long time at the junior bar. In his last year at the bar, he won, in quick succession, three cases in the House of Lords after losing in the Court of Appeal, which was said to have played a role in his rapid promotion to the bench from the time he took silk.

In 1904, on the resignation of Mr Justice Bruce, he was appointed a Justice of the High Court (King's Bench Division) on the recommendation of Lord Halsbury, and received the customary knighthood. Despite his late appointment, Bray was regarded as one of the ablest puisne judges. He frequently sat in divisional courts and as the third judge in the Court of Appeal.

Having become ill in court, Bray died in Kensington, London, on 23 March 1923, and was buried at Shere.

== Family ==
Bray married Emily Octavia Barclay, daughter of Arthur Kett Barclay, FRS, in 1888; they had four sons and four daughters. One son, Lieutenant-Colonel Francis Edmond Bray, KC, was chairman of the Board of Referees. Another, Captain Sir Jocelyn Bray, was chairman of the Thames Conservancy Board from 1938 to 1960.

His younger brother, Sir Edward Bray, was a County Court judge.

== Selected cases ==
=== As a barrister ===
- Caterham Urban District Council v Godstone Rural District Council [1904] AC 171
- Colls v Home and Colonial Stores [1904] AC 179
- Winans v Attorney-General [1904] AC 287

=== As a judge ===
- Reeve v Jennings [1910] 2 KB 522
- Sanday & Co v British and Foreign Marine Insurance Co [1915] 2 KB 781
