= John Pocklington =

English Laudian clergyman and polemicist

John Pocklington (died 1642) was an English Laudian clergyman and polemicist. By order of the Long Parliament, two of his works were burned in public.

== Life ==
He received his education at St John's College, Cambridge, where he matriculated around 1595, and graduated B.A. at the newly founded Sidney Sussex College, Cambridge, in 1598. He was admitted a fellow of his college on the Blundell foundation in 1600, commenced M.A. in 1603, and proceeded to the degree of B.D. in 1610. While at Cambridge he held high-church views.

In January 1610 he was presented to the vicarage of Babergh, Suffolk. On 13 January 1612 he was elected to a fellowship at Pembroke College, Cambridge, which he resigned in 1618. He was created D.D. in 1621. He became rector of Yelden, Bedfordshire, vicar of Waresley, Huntingdonshire, and one of the chaplains to Charles I. In 1623 he was collated a prebend in Peterborough Cathedral, and in 1626 to one at Lincoln. He was also appointed chaplain to John Williams, bishop of Lincoln. Pocklington was appointed a canon of the collegiate chapel of Windsor by patent on 18 Dec. 1639, and installed on 5 Jan. 1639–1640. On 14 Sept. 1640 he was at York, and wrote a long letter to Sir John Lambe, describing the movements of the royal army.

After his trial, Pocklington died on 14 November 1642, and was buried on the 16th in the precincts of Peterborough Cathedral.

== Family ==
By his wife Anne, who died in 1655, he had four surviving children- John, Oliver, Elizabeth and Margaret. Oliver, who was a clergyman like his father, was by his wife Katherine Towers of Castle Ashby the father of the younger John Pocklington, a long-serving member of the House of Commons of England for Huntingdon, and later a judge of the Court of Exchequer (Ireland).

== Works and prosecution ==
He published 'Sunday no Sabbath. A Sermon preached before the Lord Bishop of Lincolne at his Lordshipa Visitation at Ampthill. . . Aug. 17, 1635,' London (two editions), 1636. This was followed by 'Altare Christianum; or the dead Vicars Plea. Wherein the Vicar of Gr[antham], being dead, yet speaketh, and pleadeth out of Antiquity against him that hath broken downe his Altar,' London, 1637. The arguments advanced in the latter work were answered in 'A Quench-Coale,' 1637.

Among the king's pamphlets in the British Museum is 'The Petition and Articles exhibited in Parliament against John Pocklington, D.D., Parson of Yelden, Bedfordshire, Anno 1641,' London, 1641; reprinted in Howell's 'State Trials'. He was charged with being a ringleader in ritualistic innovations. On 12 February 1641 he was sentenced by the House of Lords never to come within the verge of the court, to be deprived of all his preferments, and to have his two books, 'Altare Christianum' and 'Sunday no Sabbath,' publicly burnt in the city of London and in each of the universities by the hand of the common executioner. When Pocklington was deprived of his preferments, William Bray, who had licensed his works, was enjoined to preach a recantation sermon in St. Margaret's Church, Westminster.
