= Coventry Labourers' and Artizans' Co-operative =

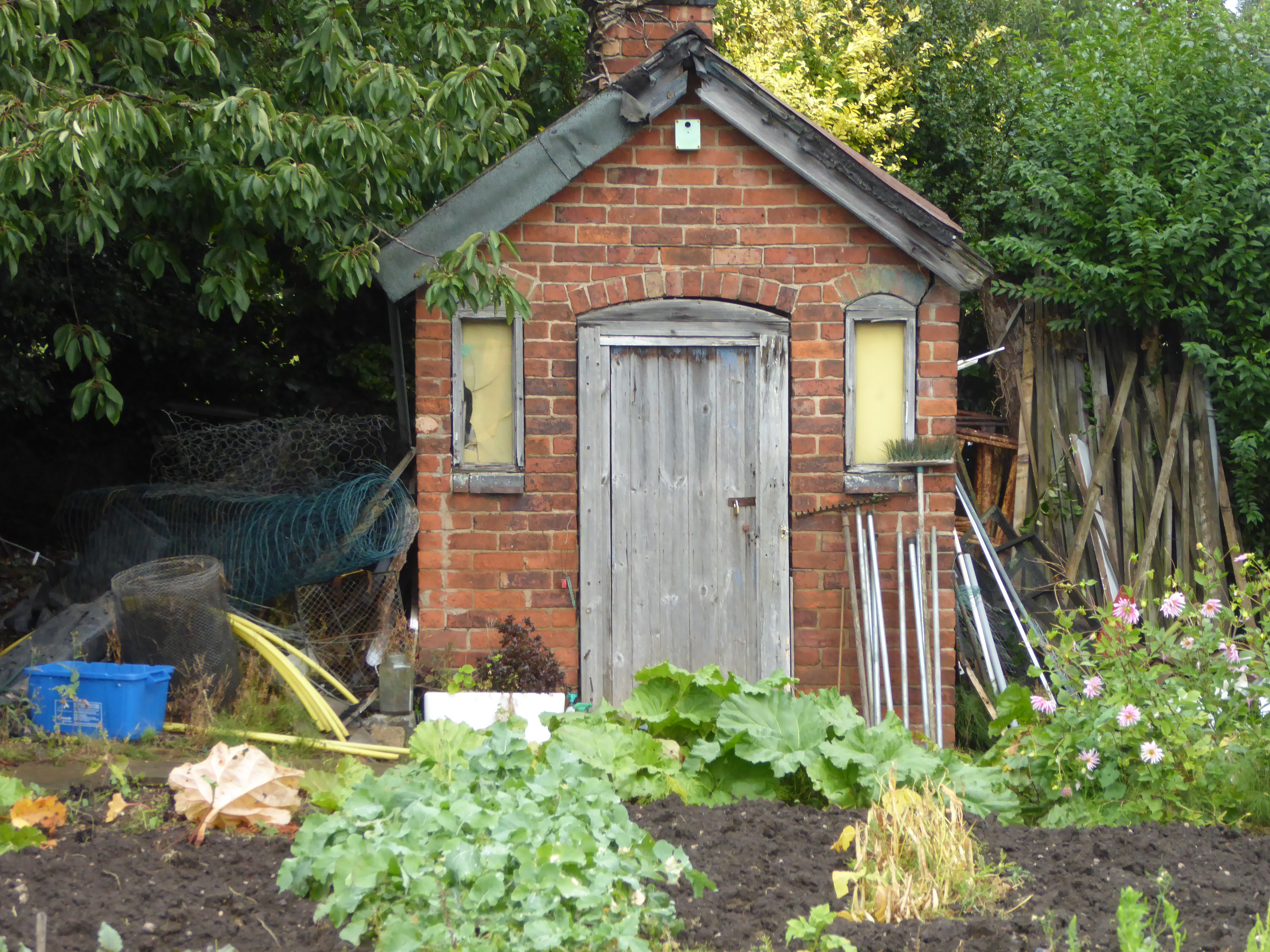
Building in Park Gardens, Stoney Road, Coventry

The Coventry Labourers' and Artizans' Co-operative was a co-operative of Coventry working men that leased land in the city for growing food.

== History ==
It was established by Charles Bray and Joseph Cash in 1843, as a result of a lecture in St Mary's Hall by James Orange of Nottingham, agent of the London Labourers' Friend Society.

Its first aim was "to furnish working men with gardens, as healthy occupations, and to help them to counteract in part the ill-effects of confinement at the loom."

It leased land on four sites, sufficient for 400 gardens, and had about 1,000 members, each of whom paid a penny a week towards the expenses of the Society, which enabled it to make loans to members, trade in coal, rent a flour mill, open a shop and pay interest to members on their shares.

The Society was "wrecked" by its readiness to grant credit to its members. When Coventry's ribbon industry went into a steep decline in 1859 many of the Society's members were unable to pay their debts and about 1862 it collapsed. A new society, called the Garden Society, was formed, which survives to this day, as the Park Gardens or Stoney Road Allotments in Stoney Road, Coventry.
