= Mary Hennell =

British writer

- Born: May 23, 1802; Manchester
- Died: March 16, 1843 (aged 40); Hackney

Mary Hennell (23 May 1802 – 16 March 1843) was a 19th-century British reforming writer from a notable family of writers.

== Life ==
Hennell was born in Manchester in 1802. She was the eldest daughter of the Unitarian family of James and Elizabeth Hennell (born Marshall). Her mother had been born in Loughborough in the East Midlands in 1778 and had the maiden name of Marshall. Her father was born in 1778 and he had become a partner in the Manchester merchants of Fazy & Co. Sara's younger sisters included the writers Sara and Caroline Hennell. The sisters are considered to be the basis for the fictional Meyrick family in George Eliot's 1876 novel Daniel Deronda.

In 1836, Charles Bray married her sister Caroline. After his sister's marriage to Bray, an enthusiastic sceptic, her brother Charles Hennell reviewed the evidences for Christian beliefs with the aim of parrying his brother-in-law's arguments. The result of the examination was that he became a sceptic himself, and in 1838 published an Enquiry concerning the Origin of Christianity in defence of his conclusions. Sara also increasingly became a sceptic too. In 1841 Charles Bray published The Philosophy of Necessity and this included an appendix written by Mary. This was titled An outline of the various social systems and communities which have been founded on the principle of co-operation and this was later made into a publication in its right in 1844. The new version had a lengthy preface that described British social conditions.

Hennell also wrote an entry for Ribbons in the Penny Cyclopaedia. The entry drew on the expertise she had gained from her family's involvement in the manufacture of ribbons. Her uncle, Samuel Hennell, manufactured ribbons in Coventry as did the family of Charles Bray.

Hennell died in Hackney in 1843 from tuberculosis.

== Tribute ==
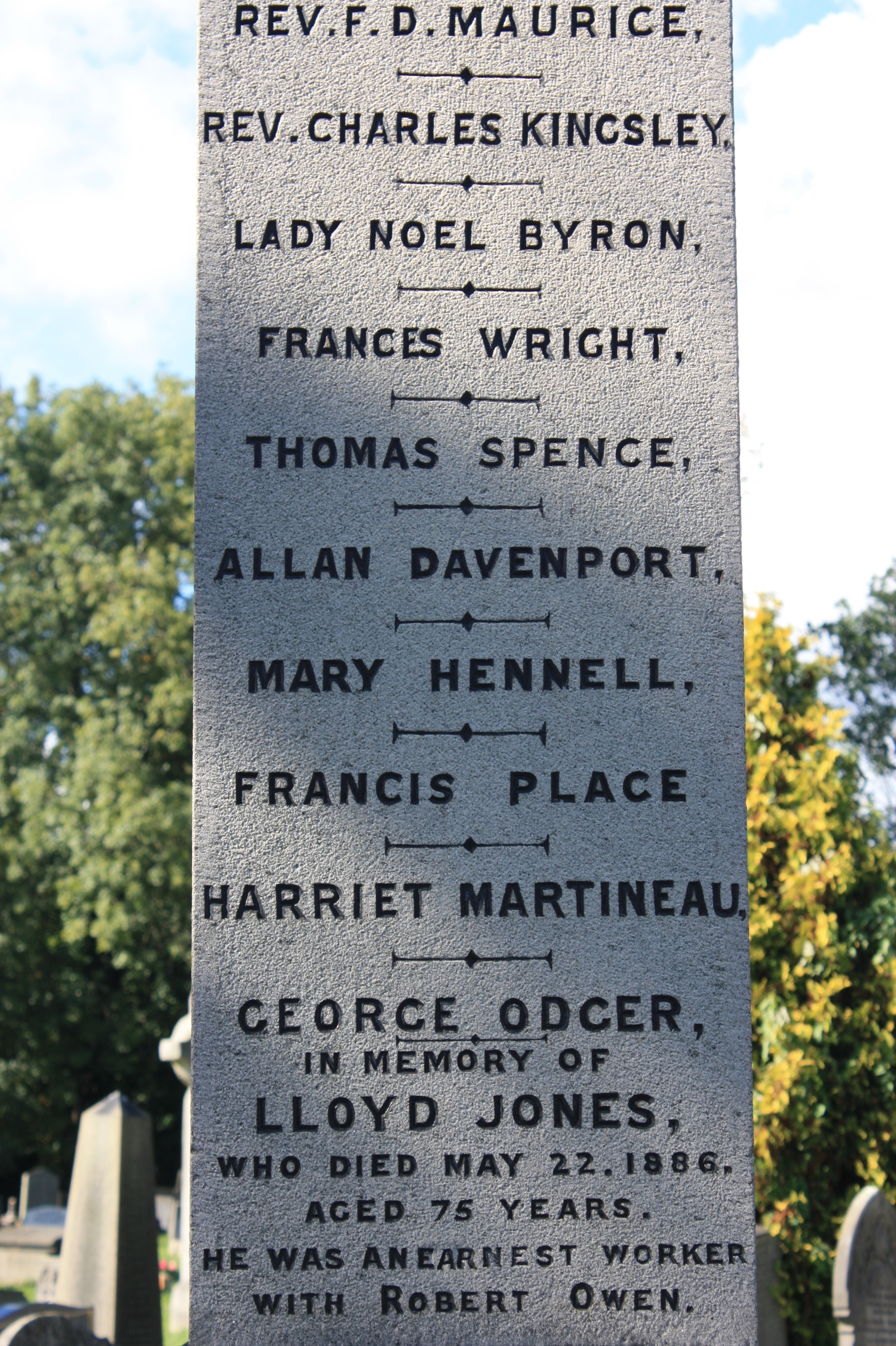
Base of the Reformers’ Memorial, Kensal Green Cemetery, including Mary Hennell’s name.

Her name is included in the Reformers’ Memorial, which was added to Kensal Green Cemetery in 1885.
