= Mary Franklin and Rebecca Franklin =

Coventry schoolmistress

Mary Franklin
- Born: 5 August 1800; Probably Coventry
- Died: 4 December 1867 (aged 67); Coventry
- Occupation: teacher
- Known for: founding Coventry school

Rebecca Franklin
- Born: 30 November 1803; Coventry
- Died: 29 May 1873 (aged 72); Coventry
- Occupation: teacher
- Known for: founding Coventry school

Mary Franklin (1800–1867) and her sister Rebecca Franklin (1803–1873) were English schoolmistresses in Coventry. Their Nant Glyn school attracted a wide range of students from the UK and abroad. Their students included Mary Ann Evans (later known as novelist George Eliot) and ribbon manufacturer and philosopher Charles Bray.

== Life ==
Mary Franklin was the eldest of the ten children of Francis and Rebecca (née Dyer) Franklin. Rebecca was the third daughter. Their father was minister of the Cow Lane Chapel in Coventry. Three of their siblings died as children. Their siblings included aspiring missionaries.

Mary first went to teach schoolchildren in Bocking in Essex, before returning to teach girls and boys in her parents' house. Her students included the future philosopher Charles Bray.

Rebecca also wanted to teach and studied in France for a year. She returned and began taking pupils in one of the Sunday school rooms at Cow Lane.

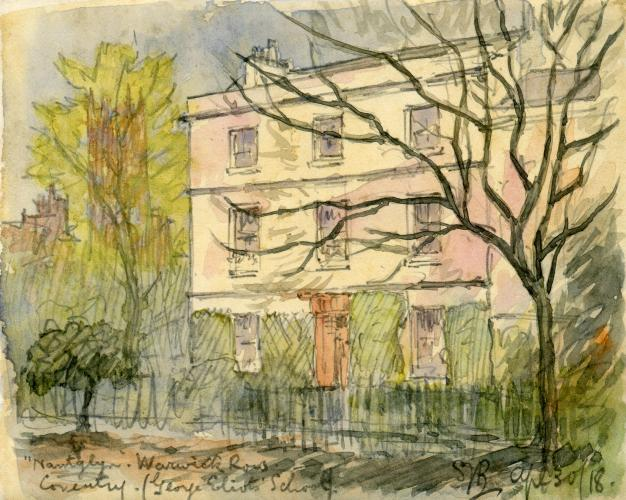
Nant Glyn School by Sydney John Bunney in 1918

The sisters opened their own day and boarding school and Nant Glyn school which operated from various Coventry addresses ending in Little Park Street. Pupils were offered music, French and German from guest teachers, with the basic education from the Franklin sisters. Mary was considered more maternal but the overall atmosphere was strict and orderly. Rebecca was keen on deportment and that students should speak in grammatically correct and thought out sentences. Each Sunday the pupils attended Mary and Rebecca's father's Baptist chapel.

Mary Ann Evans (later George Eliot) was one of the boarders at the school from age thirteen to sixteen. Evans was exposed to a quiet, disciplined belief opposed to evangelicalism. Evans was to include Mary's father in one of her novels, Felix Holt, the Radical, as the character Rufus Lyon.

Mary died of dropsy following bronchitis on 4 December 1867 at the home where she and her sister had retired in Coventry. Rebecca died in Coventry on 29 May 1873.
