= John Bray =

John Bray may refer to:

- John Bray (physician) (fl. 1377), English botanist and physician
- John Bray (composer) (1782–1822), composer of music for ''The Indian Princess
- John Francis Bray (1809–1897), American social activist and political economist
- John Cox Bray (1842–1894), Premier of South Australia
- John Bray (athlete) (1875–1945), American athlete and Olympic bronze medallist in 1900
- John Randolph Bray (1879–1978), American producer, inventor, animator, director
- Jackie Bray (1909–1982), English footballer and manager
- John Bray (communications engineer) (1911–2004), British communications engineer
- John Jefferson Bray (1912–1995), Chief Justice of South Australia, poet
- John Bray (footballer) (1937–1992), English footballer who played in the 1960 FA Cup Final
- John Bray (cricketer) (1938–2025), New Zealand cricketer
- John Bray (rugby league) (born 1941), New Zealand rugby league player
- John Bray (boxer) (born 1970), American amateur boxer-turned boxing trainer
