= Henry-Dubray =

The Henry-Dubray was a French automobile manufactured only in 1901. A product of Paris, the 5 cv three-seater voiturette was known for its "softness in rolling".
