= W. Reginald Bray =

British autograph collector (1879–1939)

- Born: Willie Reginald Bray; 30 April 1879; Forest Hill, London
- Died: 6 June 1939 (aged 60); Croydon

Willie Reginald Bray (30 April 1879 – 6 June 1939), also known as "The Autograph King", was an English eccentric who first experimented with the limits of the British postal system, including having himself delivered as a letter, and later moved into autograph collecting, amassing over 15,000 autographs by the time of his death.

== Biography ==
Bray was born in Forest Hill, London on 30 April 1879. He lived there until 1938 when he moved to Croydon. He died on 6 June 1939.
