= Roger Ernest Bray =

Canadian socialist (1875–1952)

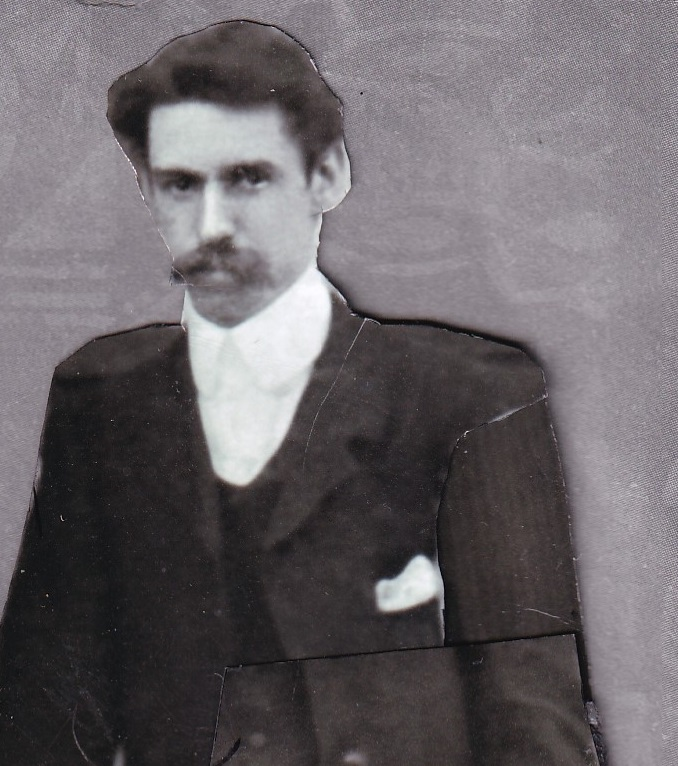
Roger Ernest Bray, 1904. Shortly after immigrating to Manitoba, Canada from Sheffield, England [family photo].

Roger Ernest Bray (19 November 1875 – 23 October 1952) was a Canadian socialist and activist. In 1919, Bray became the primary spokesman for thousands of World War I returned soldiers dissatisfied with the government during the Winnipeg General Strike in Manitoba, Canada. Though apparently not an initial member of top strike leadership, Bray was a persuasive orator and by mid-June 1919 the Winnipeg Royal North West Mounted Police considered Bray "the most dangerous person in the City.” He was arrested with other strike leaders on June 17, 1919 on multiple charges of seditious conspiracy but later acquitted of almost all charges. Bray later became one of the organizers for the Co-operative Commonwealth Federation (CCF) a precursor political party to the New Democratic Party.

== Early life and immigration to Canada ==
Born in Sheffield, England on 19 November 1875, Roger was the oldest son of Nicholas Bray Jr., a second generation silver chaser. Upon the death of his father, Roger left school to help provide for his widowed mother, five older sisters and three younger brothers. When his younger brother Archie Bray became truant, family legend relates that Roger became adamant that his brother would have the education he lacked and personally marched him to school every day. Archie would later go on to attend University of Cambridge as a First Class King's Scholar, Triple distinction and became a prominent professor of biology at the University of Montana, Harvard and Rensselaer Polytechnic Institute along with mentor to Nobel laureate Harold Urey.

Roger married in 1900 and immigrated to Winnipeg in 1903 with his young family, where he worked as a butcher. Bray was a former Methodist lay preacher who said he had discovered “that Christianity was not the means of correcting social injustice”.

Bray joined the Canadian Army in 1916 while unemployed, later explaining he had “no job and a large family.” After World War I, Bray left the church and became an active socialist and admirer of the Bolshevik Revolution.

== Conditions leading to his arrest ==
Bray had returned to Winnipeg from England on 31 December 1918. Inflation had risen 75 percent and the workweek had increased since 1914 making living conditions for the working class very difficult. It was evident that some of the elites had made a tremendous amount of money off of the war but wages had changed little for workers and jobs were sparse for returning soldiers. In many cases families were worse off than before the soldiers left. Owners were unwilling to agree to collective bargaining only dealing directly with their impoverished workers on an individual basis.

The city ground to a halt on May 15, 1919 when about one-sixth of Winnipeg's population — an estimated 25,000 to 35,000 people — walked off the job. Following the Russian Revolution, the strike committee effectively took over control of the distribution of food in the city, and the elites of the city became concerned that socialist strikers like Bray were seeking to overthrow the government.

As the strike wore on, Bray became a spokesman for returned soldiers in a series of meetings in Victoria Park, and chairman of an informal group of returned soldier strikers. Led by Bray thousands of these veterans in early June 1919 defied mayoral decrees to stop protest marches and instead marched to the office of Winnipeg Mayor Charles Gray and called for his resignation.

On 14 June 1919, a secret agent of the Royal North West Mounted Police informed the superintendent of the Winnipeg District that Bray was “at the present time the most dangerous person in the City.” Bray was arrested along with seven other strike leaders on 17 June 1919 by the government on charges of seditious conspiracy.

Bray became Vice-President of the Winnipeg Labour Council formed by the One Big Union on 5 August 1919. At his sedition trial in 1920, Bray was acquitted on most charges and convicted only on the charge of conspiracy to commit a common criminal nuisance. He was sentenced to six months in prison. Bray subsequently became an organizer for the One Big Union.

== Later political activities and death ==
Bray later moved to North Vancouver where he raised and sold gladioli and was an organizer for the Co-operative Commonwealth Federation.

He died on 23 October 1952.
