= Andy Bray =

English cricketer (born 1981)

Personal information
- Full name: Andrew Richard Bray
- Born: 29 October 1981 (age 45); Westminster, London
- Batting: Right-handed
- Bowling: Right-arm fast-medium

Domestic team information
- Years: Team
- 2000–2001: Kent Cricket Board

Career statistics
Competition	List A
Matches	5
Runs scored	5
Batting average	2.50
100s/50s	0/0
Top score	5
Balls bowled	170
Wickets	4
Bowling average	37.50
5 wickets in innings	0
10 wickets in match	0
Best bowling	2/18
Catches/stumpings	0/–
- Source: Cricinfo, 13 November 2010

Andrew Richard Bray (born 29 October 1981) is an English cricketer. Bray is a right-handed batsman who bowls right-arm fast-medium.

Bray represented the Kent Cricket Board in List A cricket. His debut List A match came against the Worcestershire Cricket Board in the 2000 NatWest Trophy. From 2000 to 2001, he represented the Board in 5 List A matches, the last of which came against the Leicestershire Cricket Board in the 2nd of the 2002 Cheltenham & Gloucester Trophy which was held in 2001. In his 5 List A matches, he scored 5 runs at a batting average of 2.50, with a high score of 5. With the ball he took 4 wickets at a bowling average of 37.50, with best figures of 2/18.

He plays club cricket for Folkestone Cricket Club in the Kent Cricket League.
