= Hiawatha Bray =

American journalist

Hiawatha Bray is a technology columnist for The Boston Globe business section.

== Education ==
Born in Chicago, Bray received a bachelor's degree in economics from Knox College in Galesburg, Illinois, in 1976 and a master's degree in communications from Wheaton College in Wheaton, Illinois, in 1985.

== Career ==
Bray started as a reporter and managing editor for Computerpeople Weekly.

He joined the Boston Globe in 1995. Bray has contributed to a number of newspapers and magazines which include Wired, Fast Company, and Black Enterprise.

In 1998, he predicted that the iMac wouldn't be viable and that Apple "will never be the great company it could have been".

Bray wrote for a number of weblogs where he supported President Bush and attacked Senator John Kerry. During the 2004 election, he reported on technological aspects of the presidential campaigns. He also reported on political computer games that encouraged support for Howard Dean's candidacy and several games featured on the Republican National Committee's website.

Bray is the co-author of You Are Here: From the Compass to GPS, the History and Future of How We Find Ourselves.

== Awards and honors ==
He has received the John Hancock Award for Business Journalism and has been honored by the National Association of Black Journalists. Marketing Computers magazine named him as one of the 10 most influential newspaper journalists covering technology. He also received an Overseas Press Club award for his work on the internet in Africa.
