= Charles Christian Hennell =

English merchant

Charles Christian Hennell (30 March 1809 – 2 September 1850) was an English merchant, known as a Unitarian apologist for his work An Inquiry concerning the Origin of Christianity.

== Life ==
Hennell was born in Manchester on 30 March 1809, the fifth of a family of eight children, including Sara Hennell and Caroline Bray. His father, first a foreign agent, and afterwards a partner in a mercantile house, died in 1816. By this time the family had moved to Hackney on the edge of London, where Charles attended a day school; from this he went to a school at Derby, kept by an uncle, Edward Higginson (the elder), a Unitarian minister. There he learned some Latin and French, and a little Greek.

Aged 15, Hennell obtained a junior clerkship with a firm of foreign merchants in London. In 1836, after twelve years in the post, he began business on his own account in Threadneedle Street as a silk and drug merchant, and in 1843, on the recommendation of his former employers, he was appointed manager of an iron company.

Hennell was associated with John Thomas Barber Beaumont in the establishment of the New Philosophical Institution, Beaumont Square, Mile End, and was one of the trustees who endeavoured to implements his plans after his death in 1841. In 1847 Hennell withdrew from business, and with his wife and child settled at Woodford, Epping. He had differences with Beaumont's son, John Augustus Beaumont, culminating in a chancery suit, and lost nearly all his savings in railway panics. After a long illness, he died at Woodford, Essex on 2 September 1850.

== Works ==
In 1836 Charles Bray, author of The Philosophy of Necessity, married Hennell's sister Caroline, setting off Hennell's writing career. The Hennells had been brought up in the Unitarianism of Joseph Priestley and Thomas Belsham. In reaction to Charles Bray's freethinking (Bray had sent in particular sent him the Diegesis of Robert Taylor) Hennell undertook an examination of the New Testament narratives. He published Inquiry concerning the Origin of Christianity in 1838. The main conclusion of the work is that Christianity is to be accepted as forming simply a portion of natural human history. John Mackinnon Robertson called it:

... the first systematic analysis, in English, without animus, of the gospels as historical documents.

And in his Short History Robertson classified Hennell as a representative of "revived English deism", with Francis William Newman, W. R. Greg, and Theodore Parker. Dr. Robert Herbert Brabant of Devizes introduced the book to David Strauss, author of Das Leben Jesu, and the Inquiry was translated into German (1839): Strauss wrote it a preface. Elinor Shaffer argues that Hennell was familiar, as was common enough in rational dissenter circles going back to Priestley, with some German theologians, but largely limited (as Strauss wrote) to works in Latin; and that his writing was not in those terms so innovative as to justify the weight sometimes given it as an influence on George Eliot.

Hennell published in 1839 Christian Theism, an essay on religious sentiment after the end of a belief in miraculous revelation. A second edition of the Inquiry appeared in 1841; it was republished with Christian Theism in one volume, 1870.

Robertson commented on how Alexander Geddes and Hennell had little impact, in their introduction of the higher criticism. William Hodge Mill, in an 1840 work aimed at Strauss, commented in an aside that Hennell's Inquiry "has excited hardly any attention here". John Hamilton Thom reviewed the Inquiry in the Prospective Review; he was hostile (even "vituperative"), but a long survey review article Pantheistic Tendencies in the Christian Remembrancer in 1846 was more sympathetic, and called some reactions in the area alarmist. In 1851 Chapman was trying to interest the philanthropist Edward Lombe in low-cost editions of the works of Hennell and Theodore Parker. Mary Ann Evans (the future writer George Eliot) was for the time close to the Brays, and in 1852 she wrote an account of the Inquiry for the Analytical Catalogue of John Chapman's publications.

== Family ==
Hennell's acquaintance with Dr. Brabant was followed (1843) by marriage to his daughter, Elizabeth Rebecca ("Rufa"); Mary Ann Evans took over the English translation of Strauss's Leben Jesu that Rufa had started. After Hennell's death she married in 1857 a disillusioned Anglican priest, the author Wathen Mark Wilks Call.
