= Leslie Bray =

English Royal Air Force officer and cricketer (1895–1957)

Personal information
- Full name: Leslie Lingwood Bray
- Born: 14 January 1895; West Ham, Essex, England
- Died: 29 November 1957 (aged 62); Ampthill, Bedfordshire, England
- Batting: Unknown
- Relatives: Charlie Bray (brother)

Career statistics
Competition	First-class
Matches	1
Runs scored	10
Batting average	–
100s/50s	–/–
Top score	10*
Catches/stumpings	1/–
- Source: Cricinfo, 20 March 2019

Leslie Lingwood Bray (14 January 1895 – 29 November 1957) was an English first-class cricketer who served as an officer in both the British Army and the Royal Air Force in both world wars.

In the latter stages of the First World War, Bray was commissioned as a second lieutenant into the London Regiment in November 1917. He was promoted to the rank of lieutenant in May 1919, alongside the temporary rank of captain that he had held since January 1919. He was transferred to the Corps of Military Accountants in April 1920, retaining his temporary rank of captain.

He transferred to the Royal Air Force in November 1925, following the disbanding of the Corps of Military Accountants, and was granted the rank of flying officer, with Bray completing his probation in May 1926. The following year he appeared for the Royal Air Force cricket team in a first-class cricket match against the Royal Navy at The Oval. He was promoted to the rank of flight lieutenant in June 1932, before promotion to the rank of squadron leader in April 1938. He served in the Royal Air Force in the Second World War, during which he was promoted to the rank of wing commander in March 1940. He retired from active service in January 1945, retaining the rank of wing commander.

He died at Ampthill in November 1957. His brother, Charlie Bray, was also a first-class cricketer.
