= Ed Bray =

Australian rules footballer (born 1910)

Personal information
- Full name: Mark Edward Bray
- Born: 12 September 1910; North Melbourne, Victoria
- Died: 23 July 2002 (aged 91)
- Height: 165 cm (5 ft 5 in)
- Weight: 63 kg (139 lb)

Playing career^{1}
Years	Club	Games (Goals)
1927, 1929	North Melbourne	6 (9)
- ^{1} Playing statistics correct to the end of 1929.

Mark Edward Bray (12 September 1910 – 23 July 2002) was an Australian rules footballer who played with North Melbourne in the Victorian Football League (VFL).
