= Jack Bray (Australian footballer) =

Australian rules footballer (1916–1982)

Personal information
- Full name: John Denis Bray
- Born: 11 January 1916; Malvern, Victoria
- Died: 13 January 1982 (aged 66); New Zealand
- Original team: Ormond (VAFA)
- Height: 178 cm (5 ft 10 in)
- Weight: 85 kg (187 lb)

Playing career^{1}
Years	Club	Games (Goals)
1940–1941	St Kilda	17 (18)
- ^{1} Playing statistics correct to the end of 1941.

John Denis Bray (11 January 1916 – 13 January 1982) was an Australian rules footballer who played with St Kilda in the Victorian Football League (VFL).

== Family ==
The son of Melbourne footballer Joseph Michael Bray (1888–1955), and Mary Helena Bray (1886–1971), née Murphy, John Denis Bray was born at Malvern, Victoria on 11 January 1916.

He married Elizabeth Mary Persia Gladys Coram (1909–2004), known as Gladys, on 5 August 1939. They had five children, John, Judith, Sherrill, Lorraine, and Peter.

== Football ==
=== Ormond (VAFA) ===
He began his senior football with the Ormond Amateur Football Club in the Victorian Amateur Football Association (VAFA) in 1935. He was Ormond's captain in 1937, 1938, and 1939.

=== St Kilda (VFL) ===
Having tried out with Richmond in 1937, he went to St Kilda in 1940. With no chance of playing in the finals, and preparing for the next season, St Kilda used the last games of the 1940 season to give several of its best Seconds players senior experience. Promoted from the Seconds, he played in the last three home-and-away matches of the 1940 season for St Kilda: along with Marcus Hines, Bray's first senior game was against North Melbourne, at Arden Street, on 27 July 1940.

In his final match of the 1940 season, against Carlton, at Prices Park, on 17 August 1940, he was involved in a fierce confrontation in the third quarter. Bray was reported for striking Carlton's Jack Hale, and Carlton's Ron Savage was reported for charging Bray. Both players were found guilty, and were disqualified for four matches. Having served his suspension, he played in each of the 14 remaining home-and-away matches in the 1941 season.

=== Ormond (VAFA) ===
In 1946, when the VAFA competition had resumed from its five-year wartime suspension, Bray was once again playing for Ormond. He retired at the end of the 1947 season, having played almost 150 VAFA games with Ormond.

== Military service ==
He enlisted in the Second AIF on 1 September 1942, and was discharged on 28 November 1945.

== Death ==
He died (suddenly) while visiting family in Dunedin, New Zealand on 13 January 1982. He was buried at Green Park Cemetery, Waldronville, New Zealand.
