= Sara Hennell =

British author and translator

Sara Sophia Hennell
- Born: 23 November 1812; Hackney, London, England
- Died: 7 March 1899 (aged 86); Coventry, England
- Resting place: Coventry cemetery
- Scientific career
- Fields: Author and translator

Sara Sophia Hennell (23 November 1812 – 7 March 1899) was a British author. She was a close associate of George Eliot, Charles Christian Hennell,Caroline Bray and Charles Bray.

== Early life and education ==
Sara Hennell was born on 23 November 1812 at 2 St Thomas's Square, Hackney. She was the seventh of eight children in the Unitarian family of James (b. 1778) and Elizabeth Hennell (née Marshall). Her mother was born in Loughborough in 1778. Her father was a partner in the Manchester merchants of Fazy & Co. Sara's eldest sister was Mary Hennell and her youngest was Caroline Bray. The sisters are considered to be the basis for the fictional Meyrick family in George Eliot's 1876 novel Daniel Deronda.

In 1836, Charles Bray married her sister Caroline. After his sister's marriage to Bray, a thoroughgoing sceptic, her brother Charles Hennell reviewed the evidences for Christian beliefs to parry his brother-in-law's argument. The result of the examination was that he became a sceptic himself, and in 1838 published an Enquiry concerning the Origin of Christianity in defence of his conclusions. Sara also increasingly became a sceptic too.

In 1851, she and her mother left Hackney in London, and moved to Ivy Cottage in Coventry in the Midlands. Ivy Cottage was adjacent to Rosehill, in which the Rosehill Circle met and where Sara's sister Cara and her husband Charles Bray lived. Sara become governess to her nephew, Frank Spencer Hennell and the Brays' adopted daughter Elinor Mary who was always known as Nelly, likely Charles Bray's illegitimate daughter by Hannah Steane

== Friendship with George Eliot ==
In 1842, at Rosehill, Bray's house in Coventry, she first met Mary Ann Evans (George Eliot). They corresponded constantly for the following twelve years. Evan's endearments including "Beloved Achates" to "Cara Sposa" indicate their intimacy.

Having met David Strauss when travelling in Germany with the Brabants in 1844, Sara declined to translate Strauss' Das Leben Jesu (Life of Jesus) and instead agreed to revise the work of her sister-in-law Rufa, and then of Evans, to whom the task of translation was passed in 1844. In 1854, Evans also consulted Hennell over her translation of Feuerbach's The Essence of Christianity.

At the end of their "German period", the theological and political paths of Sara and Evans diverged (Hennell was an active campaigner for women's rights), until by 1869 Evans noted herself "irritated" during her friend's increasingly rare visits. However, their association continued, and the Hennell sisters are considered to be the basis for the Meyrick sisters - Kate, Amy and Mab - in George Eliot's 1876 novel Daniel Deronda.

== Publications ==
- Christianity and Infidelity, Hall, Virtue, London, 1857
- Present Religion as a Faith owning Fellowship with Thought, Trubner & Co, London, in three volumes in 1865, 1873 and 1887
- Thoughts in Aid of Faith, George Manwaring, London, 1865
