= Wathen Mark Wilks Call =

English freethinking poet and writer (1817–1890)

Wathen Mark Wilks Call (7 June 1817 – 20 August 1890) was an English freethinker, poet and writer. He was a deacon and priest in the Church of England from 1843 to 1856.

== Career ==
Call was educated at St John's College, Cambridge and obtained a BA (1843) and MA (1846). He was an ordained deacon (1843), priest (1844) and curate at Treneglos with Warbstow, Cornwall (1846) and in Marston Bigot, Somerset (1847–1856). Call later had doubts and resigned from the Church of England in 1856. He became an advocate of positivism and contributed to magazines such as The Fortnightly Review, Household Words and The Westminster Review. He married Rufa Hennell in 1857. He was a friend of George Eliot and George Henry Lewes.

His book Final Causes: A Refutation was a criticism of the argument from design.

He died at Addison Gardens, Kensington.

== Publications ==
- Lyra Hellenica (1842)
- Golden Histories, Etc. (1871)
- Reverberations Revised, With a Chapter From My Autobiography (1875)
- Final Causes: A Refutation (1891)
