= Molly S. Bray =

American geneticist

- Education: University of Houston (MEd) University of Texas (PhD and Post-Doctoral)

Molly S. Bray is an American geneticist, currently serving as the Susan T. Jastrow Human Ecology Chair for Excellence in Nutritional Sciences at University of Texas at Austin. Bray is a nationally recognized expert and a featured speaker on the genetics of obesity, energy balance, and exercise response.

She has a master's degree in exercise physiology from the University of Houston and a PhD in Human and Molecular Genetics from the UT Graduate School of Biomedical Sciences. She also served as the former Director of the Heflin Center for Genomic Science Genomics Core Laboratory at the University of Alabama at Birmingham and the Children's Nutrition Research Center/Baylor College of Medicine Genetics Core Laboratory.

Bray's research focuses on the relationship between energy balance and lifestyle factors such as exercise, nutrition, and circadian patterns of behavior. Her findings related to how the timing and quality of energy intake affect weight gain and metabolic health have been featured on national and international news programs and a myriad of websites and popular news media. Bray also currently leads one of the largest genetic studies of exercise adherence established to date, the Training Interventions and Genetics of Exercise Response (TIGER) study, with a total cohort of more than 3,700 individuals. Bray's research has included investigations of aerobic fitness and resting and exercise energy expenditure in children and adolescents, circadian studies of feeding and metabolic response, and clinical studies of morbidly obese adolescents undergoing bariatric surgery. Bray has published in many peer-reviewed journals and her work has been featured in national and international scientific meetings.

== Research ==
Over the course of her career, Bray has published over 180 scientific papers. Her research spans several fields, including human genetics, nutrition, exercise physiology, and metabolic health. Bray's work integrates genomic research with studies of nutrition and metabolism, particularly in relation to obesity, energy balance, and metabolic disease.

In the field of obesity, Bray has worked on discovering covariance patterns across energy balance traits. According to Bray's publication, these traits enable the discovery of genes associated with obesity.

Bray has also studied the influence of exercise training on dietary patterns among young adults. The results from that study found that most dietary pattern scores were lowered following exercise training. Additionally, Bray's research found that a longer duration of exercise was linked with decreased preferences for western and snacking patterns, while a higher intensity of exercise was linked to an increased preference for prudent patterns.
