= Tom Bray =

American saloon keeper and underworld figure (fl.1850–1890)

- Occupation: Saloon keeper
- Known for: New York saloon keeper and underworld figure during the mid-to late 19th century.

Tom Bray (fl. 1850–1890) was an American saloon keeper and underworld figure in New York City during the mid-to late 19th century. He was the owner of a downtown Manhattan dive bar, "Tom Bray's", located on Thompson Street, and which served as an underworld hangout for thieves and bank robbers. The saloon, according to author Frank Moss, was known for its violence as "several men were killed there and a number were badly cut and shot" during its forty years in operation.

A contemporary of Johnny Dobbs, who ran a similar establishment on Mott Street, Bray acted as a fence in the old Fourth Ward and became one of the most successful in the district during his lifetime. Unlike Dobbs, who eventually died penniless after handling $2 million in his criminal career, Bray "banked" his money and was reportedly worth between $200,000 and $350,000 at the time of his death. As of 1897, "Tom Bray's" was still standing.
