= Lourinda Bray =

American restoration artist and historian (1946–2024

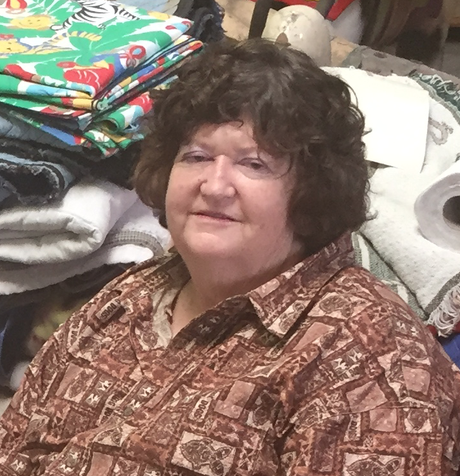
- Lourinda Bray in August 2016.
- Born: 1946
- Died: November 19, 2024 (aged 77–78)
- Occupations: Restoration artist and historian
- Known for: Carousel restoration and history

}

Lourinda Bray (1946 – November 19, 2024) was an American restoration artist and historian with a specialty in carousel animals. She was also the owner of Running Horse Studios, a 7,000-square-foot carousel animal restoration warehouse. Her collection exceeded 400 items and comprised animals created throughout America, Mexico, and Europe from the mid-19th century to the 21st century. In addition to carousel figures, she collected and restored other parts of carousels such as decorative mirrors, placards, base boards, and benches. Her collection also included carousel-themed toys, postcards, and miniatures. The collection was sourced from numerous carousel carvers from the Golden Age of carousels such as Herschell-Spillman, Charles Carmel, Charles Looff, E. Joy Morris, M.C. Illions & Sons Carousell Works, Philadelphia Toboggan Company, Dentzel Carousel Company, C. W. Parker Amusement Company, W.P. Wilcox, Josef Hübner, D.C. Muller Brothers, J.R. Anderson, Stein & Goldstein, Charles W. Dare, Orton, Sons & Spooner, Daniel C. Muller & Bro, Bayol Carousel Company, Limonaire Frères, Carl Müller, and Daniel Hegereda.

Bray had previously co-hosted the National Carousel Association's Technical Assistance Conference due to her expertise and curated two major exhibitions of her restoration work at the Pasadena Museum of History.

== Early life and education ==
Bray was raised in Pasadena, California and attended Mayfield School, Chateau Mont-Choisi in Lausanne, Switzerland, and Westridge School for Girls in Pasadena.

Bray was inspired by carousel animals from a young age, particularly when she saw the famous Griffith Park carousel when she was five. She liked to draw horses and wanted to ride live ones but was allergic, making being in their presence difficult. The next best approximation were carousel horses, which Bray rode whenever possible.

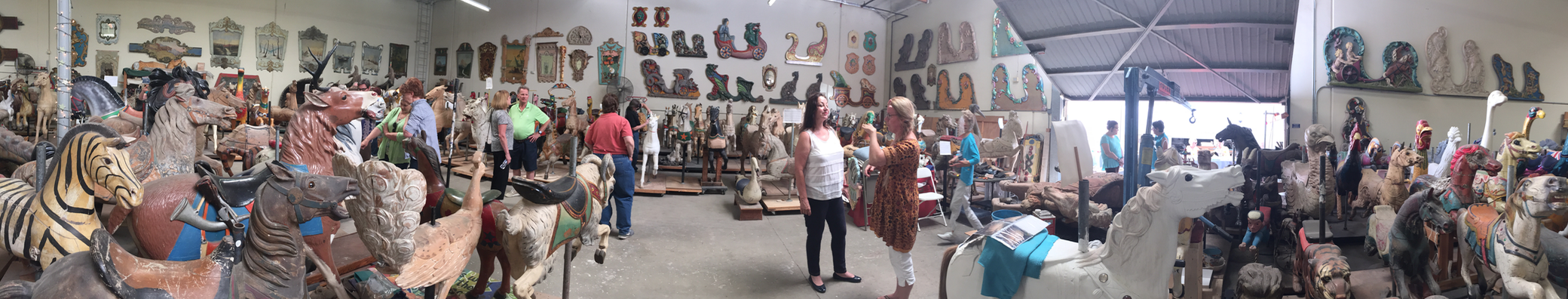
Lourinda Bray's Running Horse Studios.

Bray attended Tennessee-Wesleyan College, earning a bachelor's degree in painting. She attended Occidental College for graduate school, earning a master’s in Drama and Stage Craft, with a focus on set design and special effects for television, including light design.

== Career ==
In the late 1970s, Bray began purchasing carousel animals to restore with funds she had inherited and invested. Her first purchase was a figure from the Kiddieland Carousel at the Pomona Fair. A major restoration effort was undertaken when, after 14 years of working on it, Bray purchased the Santa's Village Carousel.

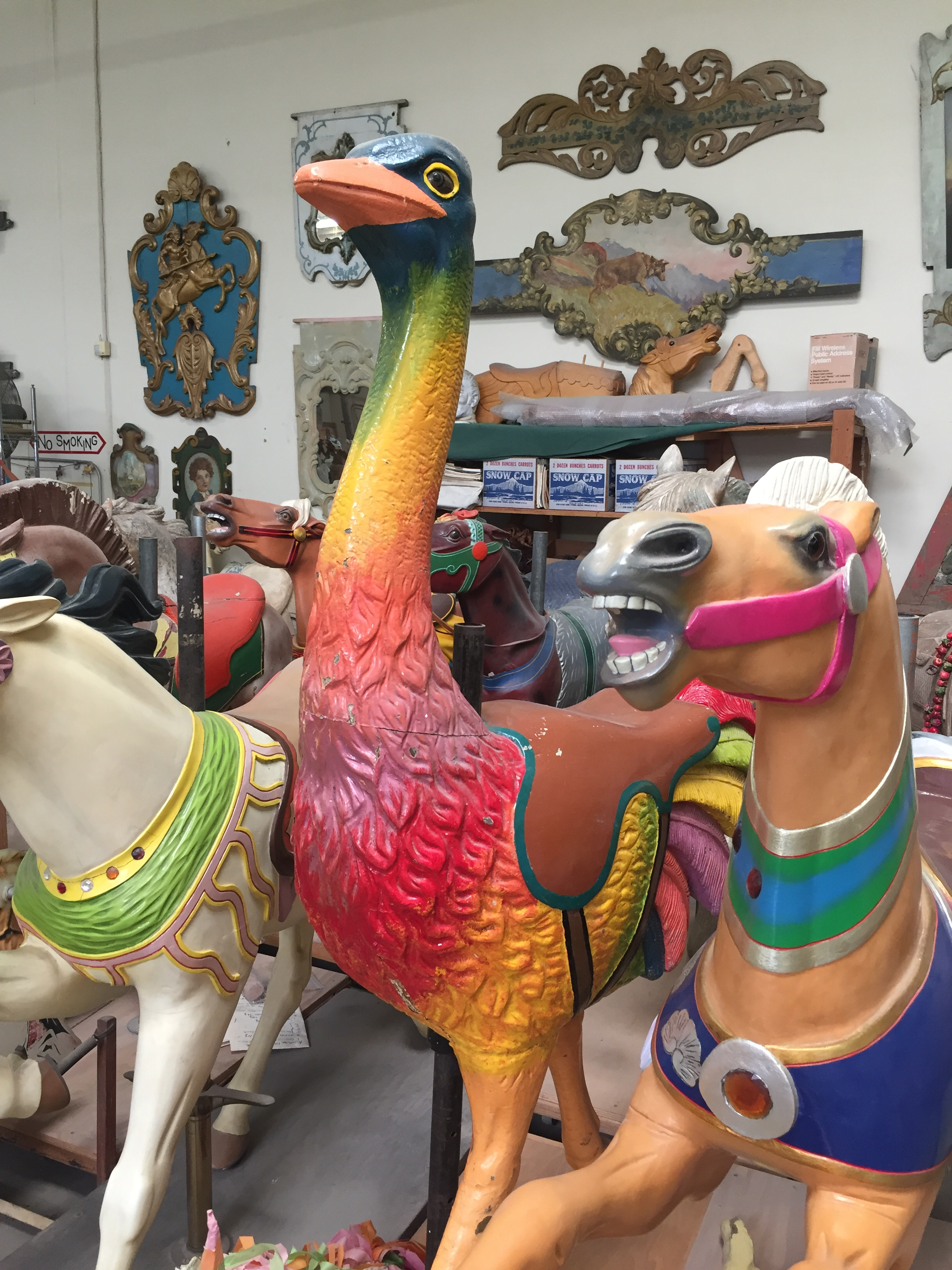
Some of Lourinda Bray's many restored carousel animals.

Bray founded her studio in the early 1980s. She amassed carousel figures of all kinds since then, from serpents, zebras, tigers, camels, and roosters, to dragons, witches, lions, peacocks, goats, and cats. Her oldest hand-carved animal was a tiger from 1875. Her holdings included pieces from the Knott's Berry Farm Lagoon Carousel; the estate of Swen Swenson, America's first collector of carousel pieces; the only known zebra carved by famous carousel carver Charles Carmel, and other curiosities.

Bray's restored animals have been the subject of two major exhibitions at the Pasadena Museum of History in Pasadena, California: Flying Horses and Mythical Beasts: The Magical World of Carousels and Giddy Up: Children Take the Reins.
