= Michel Debray =

French admiral and politician

Michel Debray (French pronunciation: [miʃɛl dəbʁɛ]; September 10, 1936 – February 19, 2024) was a French admiral and politician.

== Military career ==
He was in charge of the aircraft carriers Foch and Clemenceau.

== Political career ==
From 1988 to 1999, he led the Fondation Charles-de-Gaulle, between Jean Foyer and Yves Guéna.

In 1997, he participated in the foundation of the Alliance pour la souveraineté de la France. He was a member of the high council of the Forum pour la France of Pierre Marie Gallois. He is charged, with the admiral Claude Gaucherand, of the commission of the National defense.

In September 2012, he joined with his wife the Popular Republican Union.
