= Claude A. Bray Jr. =

American politician from Georgia (1931–2020)

Claude A. Bray Jr. (July 14, 1931 – June 12, 2020) was an American lawyer and politician.

Bray was born in Grantville, Georgia. He moved with his family to Manchester, Georgia and graduated from Manchester High School. Bray graduated from University of Georgia School of Law and practiced law in Manchester, Georgia. Bray also served in the United States Air Force and was commissioned a second lieutenant. Bray served in the Georgia House of Representatives from 1967 to 1987 and was a Democrat. Bray died in Ellerslie, Georgia.
