= Archie Wilmotte Leslie Bray =

English-American educator (1883–1942)

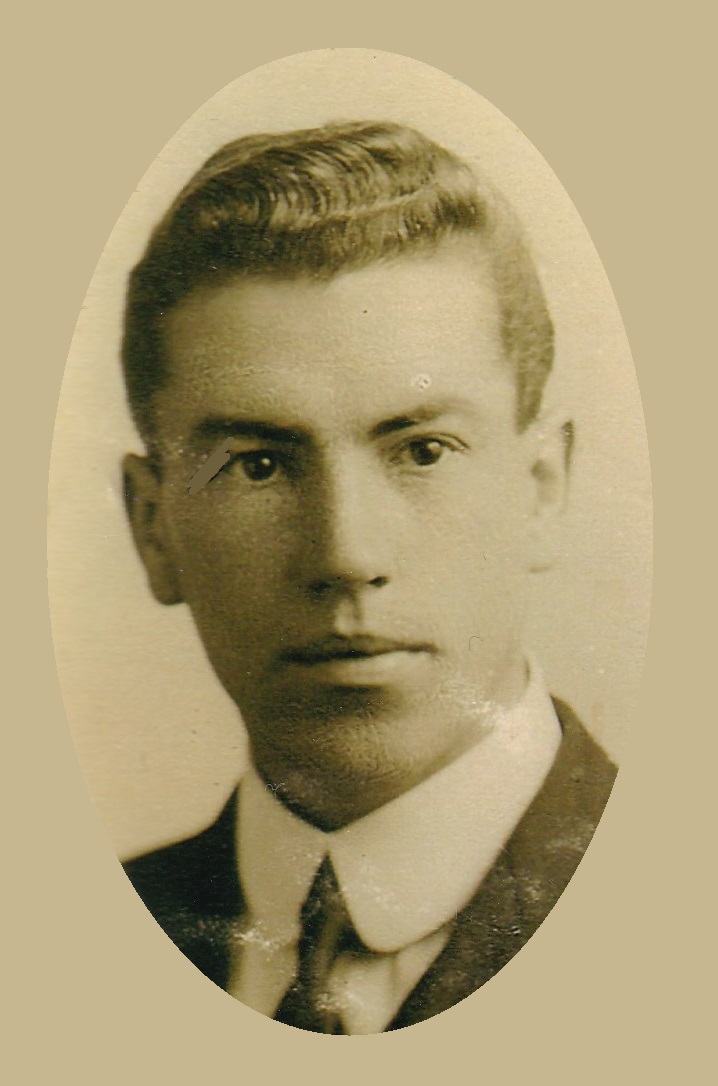
Archie Bray about 1905

Archie Wilmotte Leslie Bray (1883–1942) was an English-American educator. Bray served as a founder and head of Department of Biology at Rensselaer Polytechnic Institute (RPI), between 1925 and his death in 1942. Bray is credited by Nobel laureate Harold Ulrey as being an inspiration for him in switching from psychology to the natural sciences. A popular teacher at several universities including University of Montana, Harvard and Rensselaer, a prominent freshman dormitory at RPI is named in his honor.

== Early life and education ==
Bray was born in Sheffield, England to Nicholas Bray Jr., a second generation silver chaser and Mary Ann Rawson. English-Canadian activist Roger Ernest Bray was his elder brother. A family legend credits Roger with keeping a truant young Archie in school after their father died.

At the turn of the century Bray traveled through "most of the United States and some of South America" before he returned to England in 1905 to attend Cambridge University.

At Cambridge Bray was a First Class King's Scholar, Triple distinction. During Bray's time in Cambridge he was a member of the “Authentic Club,” a reorganized version of the Cambridge Apostles, and served as captain of their association football team.

== Early travel, teaching and graduate work ==
According to Harold Urey's apocryphal account of his early mentor, after receiving his natural science degree Bray was eager to travel and having spent all his money on passage across the Atlantic “started his sightseeing by train – freight train.” [Thomas, “Harold C. Urey,” p. 221]

Bray did acknowledge that during this time he toured Newfoundland for two years and taught school in Labrador. He then spent two years traveling through the rest of Canada following which Bray received a graduate degree in philosophy from the University of Oregon and then did some graduate work at the University of Montana. [phD thesis p. 42]

Urey's account of his mentor was more fantastic saying Bray was traveling from Chicago with "nothing but the clothes on his back" [Harold Clayton Urey, Marie]. "Bray was kicked off of the train in Missoula, Montana, where he next pursued a job at the University. As he had no credentials with him, he took a job as a janitor in the university. At some point, Urey's story goes, the university realized that they had a Cambridge-educated biologist in their midst and Bray was promoted to the position of assistant professor in zoology." [Thomas, “Harold C. Urey,” p. 222]

As for Urey's account of Bray starting at University of Montana as a janitor, according to his obituary Bray held several jobs before “settling down as an educator,” including cowhand, muleteer, cabin boy, hotel porter, ditch digger, and draughtsman.

== Teaching and mentoring at the University of Montana ==
Starting in 1913, Bray spent four years at the University of Montana one year as an instructor and three years as assistant professor. One of his early students was future Nobel laureate Harold Urey. According to Urey, Bray was a born educator. "Professor Bray was just a splendid, model teacher who opened up the whole fascinating world of science to me.” [Urey, “Unpublished Autobiography,” 4.] Urey considered his mentor “master of every subject from chemistry to theology with the exception of math”. [Harold Clayton Urey author Marie...]

Bray also enjoyed working with students outside of class and involved himself with the students in singing and debate. He also organized a group of young students including Urey into a philosophical club that he called The Authentic Society. In 1915 this organization became the Alpha Delta Alpha fraternity. A history of the fraternity stated that the Society and the fraternity were modeled after the Cambridge Apostles, a 19th-century “free discussion society” within Cambridge which consisted of the young Alfred Lord Tennyson and John Stuart Mill, among other “men of world prominence.” [Alpha Delta Alpha, “The State University of Montana”, 1918, 2, Box 1, Folder 1, ADA]

The Montana Fraternity continually grew in importance, and became one of the strong organizations of the university, intellectually and politically. Weekly meetings of the society were held; and the men were so continually together that a strong fraternal spirit developed. [Alpha Delta Alpha, “The State University of Montana”, 1918, 2, Box 1, Folder 1, ADA] In its first seven years the Fraternity consistently reported the highest grade point average and graduation rate of any fraternity on campus. [Alpha Delta Alpha, “The Fraternity Situation”, 1923, 9, Box 1, Folder 1, ADA. ] The membership took on extracurricular discussions and debates on various topics. Bray acted as an adviser to this group of young men;

When the group went about organizing a reunion in the 1960s, they invited Bray's widow to join the reunion and indicated in their correspondence that a photo of Bray hung in a place of distinction next to a portrait of Sir Galahad in the fraternity's living room.[Everett G. Poindexter to Harold C. Urey, November 8, 1961, Box 100, Folder 10, HCU.]

== World War I and postgraduate work at Harvard ==
With World War I Bray enlisted as a biologist in the service of the Chemical Warfare Service (CWS) in Washington, D.C., where he worked under the Harvard chemist and Chief of the Defense Section, Arthur Lamb. There Bray investigated biological methods of detecting gas weapons. [Bray, “Who's Who,” 2.]

Up to this time Bray had hired Ulrey as a field biologist working for him in Montana. When Urey felt some pressure to join his fraternity brothers in military service and take part in the excitement of the war effort Bray advised his protege to join the war effort with his chemical training, telling the budding scientist that “A trained chemist should serve on the chemical side.” [ William R. Shelton, “Harold Urey, Adventurer,” in 1965, Science Year: The World Book Science Annual (Chicago: Field Enterprises Educational Corporation, 1965), 354. ] Urey's heading his mentor's advice may have saved his life as most of his 37 fraternity members who enlisted in the war effort perished in World War I.

Working under Harvard chemist Arthur Lamb during the War likely led to Bray's subsequent teaching fellowships at Harvard University [A. Lawrence Lowell, Reports of the President and the Treasurer of Harvard College, 1917-1918 (Cambridge MA: Harvard University, 1919), 235.] Bray's first Harvard fellowship started September 1, 1918.

== Founder then Head of the Biology Department at Rensselaer ==
As a founding member of the Rensselaer Polytechnic Institute's Department of Biology in 1925, it was as an educator that Bray would distinguish himself throughout the rest of his career.

Biographer Matthew Benjamin Shindell concluded in his biography of Nobel laureate Harold Urey "it was Bray perhaps above any other influence that helped Urey to shed the skin of the 'conscientious, blue-eyed Indiana farm boy.'”
