= Linda L. Bray =

US Army officer (born 1960)

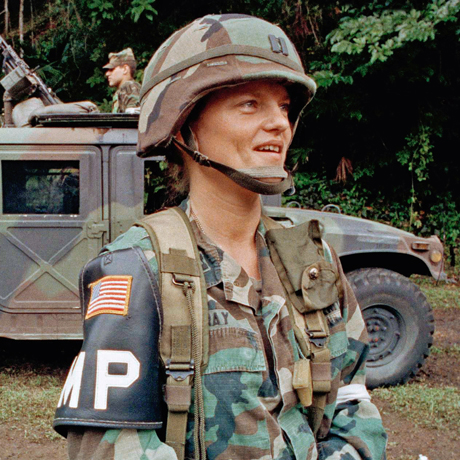
- Bray in 1990
- Born: 1960 (age 65–66); Sanford, North Carolina
- Occupation: U.S. Army Captain
- Years active: 1982–1991
- Known for: First woman to lead troops into combat

Linda L. Bray (born 1960) is a former U.S. Army officer known for being the first woman in the United States military to lead troops into combat. She served in the Panama Invasion and during the Cold War. Bray's career started in 1982 and ended with her retirement in 1991.

== Early life ==
Bray was born in Sanford, North Carolina, and raised in Butner. She graduated from South Granville High School in Creedmoor, North Carolina. She attended Western Carolina University, in 1981, but didn't join the Reserve Officers’ Training Corps (ROTC) until 1983. Bray graduated with a degree in criminal justice in 1982, but returned in 1983 to earn a military science degree and fulfill her ROTC requirement. She qualified for a direct commission.

== Career ==
=== Training ===
Bray enrolled in Western Carolina University's ROTC program on May 15, 1983. In June 1983, she was commissioned a second lieutenant.

From November 1983 to 1987, Bray served with the 556th Military Police Company in Siegelsbach, West Germany. After that, she began training to be a training officer and then eventually became a personnel officer.

Bray was an active military member during the Cold War from 1983 to 1991.

=== Panama invasion ===
Linda Bray was the first female commissioned officer to lead U.S. troops in battle, in 1989.

From December 1989 to April 1990 Bray was deployed to Panama for Operation Just Cause as commander of the 988th Military Police Company. President Bush ordered the Panama Invasion following the murder of a U.S. Marine at a road block by soldiers of the Panama Defense Force (PDF), and the kidnapping and torture of two other US citizens during the same incident. The reason for the invasion was to overthrow Panama's military dictator at the time, Manuel Noriega.

Bray and her platoon's objective was to neutralize an attack-dog kennel on the periphery of Panama City. They were armed with machine guns and grenade launchers. The kennel turned out to be heavily defended by the Panamanian Defense Forces (PDF). Her team used a bullhorn to tell them to surrender and also fired warning shots. When their warnings went unheeded, they opened fire. The PDF returned it. The battle lasted three hours before the kennel was secured. Her team killed three and captured one prisoner. Several of the attack dogs were also killed during the battle.

At the time, women were barred from serving in combat roles. The team she led included both men and women.

It was an important military operation. A woman led it, and she did an outstanding job. —Marlin Fitzwater, White House spokesperson

She was awarded the Army Commendation Medal for Valor.

==== Fallout ====
The news about Bray was on the cover of many newspapers during the Panama Invasion. She claimed to have been surprised to see attention focused on her gender, rather than showcasing the accomplishments of the troops. This caused issues in her career and led to debates over women's rights in the military.

As a result of the experiences of women in Operation Just Cause, Rep. Patricia Schroeder drafted legislation (H.R. 3868) that would allow women to serve in combat on a test basis. It did not pass. This fueled the Direct Ground Combat Definition and Assignment Rule issued by the Department of Defense in 1994. It excluded women from engaging in combat. It was not until January 24, 2013, that this rule was rescinded by Secretary of Defense Leon Panetta. Bray said she was "thrilled" and "excited" when the ban was lifted. "I think it's absolutely wonderful that our nation's military is taking steps to help women break the glass ceiling."

== Retirement ==
Bray retired from the Army on April 16, 1991, due to a noncombat injury. She injured herself during training, at about the time she needed surgery for her hips. She claimed it was her fault because she carried too much weight during a training exercise.

== Personal life ==
She married John Raymond "Randy" Bray III on January 4, 1985. The two had met while stationed in Germany in 1983. Bray is currently a recruiter in Winston-Salem, North Carolina.
