= Jocelyn Bray =

British surveyor (1880–1964)

Captain Sir Jocelyn Bray, DL (7 April 1880 – 12 February 1964) was a British chartered surveyor and land agent who was Chairman of the Thames Conservancy Board from 1938 to 1960.

A member of the ancient Bray family, lords of the manor of Shere, Bray was the son of High Court judge Sir Reginald More Bray.
