= James Bray Jr. =

Virginian politician (1670–1725)

Member of the House of Burgesses for James City County, Colony of Virginia
- In office 1700-1702 Serving with George Marable
- Preceded by: Henry Duke
- Succeeded by: Benjamin Harrison

Personal details
- Born: c. 1670 Williamsburg, Virginia, English America
- Died: November 25, 1725 (aged 54–55) Williamsburg, Virginia, British America
- Resting place: Bruton Parish Church
- Spouse: Mourning Glenn Pettus (m. 1697)
- Children: 3
- Parent: James Bray (father)
- Occupation: Merchant; planter; politician

James Bray Jr. (c. 1670 – November 25, 1725) was a merchant, planter, and politician in the Colony of Virginia, who once represented James City County in the House of Burgesses.

== Early and family life ==
Born to Angelica, the wife of brash attorney and politician James Bray (who died in 1691), he received an education appropriate to his class.

Circa 1697, Bray married Mourning, the widow of Thomas Pettus, who bore sons Thomas and James, and daughter Elizabeth Bray.

== Career ==
In 1700 Bray purchased the legal interests of Pettus' other heirs in 1,280 acres known as the Littletown and Utopia plantations on the east side of College Creek in Williamsburg, which he developed into his family seat. He also owned a brick house and lots in Williamsburg. Bray was a justice of the peace in James City County, and in 1705 so berated fellow justice (and sometime burgess) Thomas Cowles that he resigned.

On July 23, 1700, Bray licensed a slave ship at Jamestown.

James City voters elected Bray one of the men representing them in the House of Burgesses during the 1700-1702 session.

Governor Francis Nicholson disliked Bray.

== Death and legacy ==
Bray made his last will and testament about a week before his death, and it was presented for probate in York County on March 14, 1726.
