= John Bray (physician) =

English physician and botanist of the 14th century

John Bray (fl. 1377) was an English physician and botanist.

Bray received a pension of 100 shillings a year from William, earl of Salisbury, which was confirmed by Richard II. He wrote a list of herbs in Latin, French, and English, 'Synonyma de nominibus herbarum.' This manuscript was formerly part of the collection of F. Bernard; it is now in the Sloane Collection in the British Library.

== Note ==
- "Bray, John" . Dictionary of National Biography. London: Smith, Elder & Co. 1885–1900.
