= Henry Truro Bray =

English-American Episcopal priest, philosopher and homeopath (1846–1922)

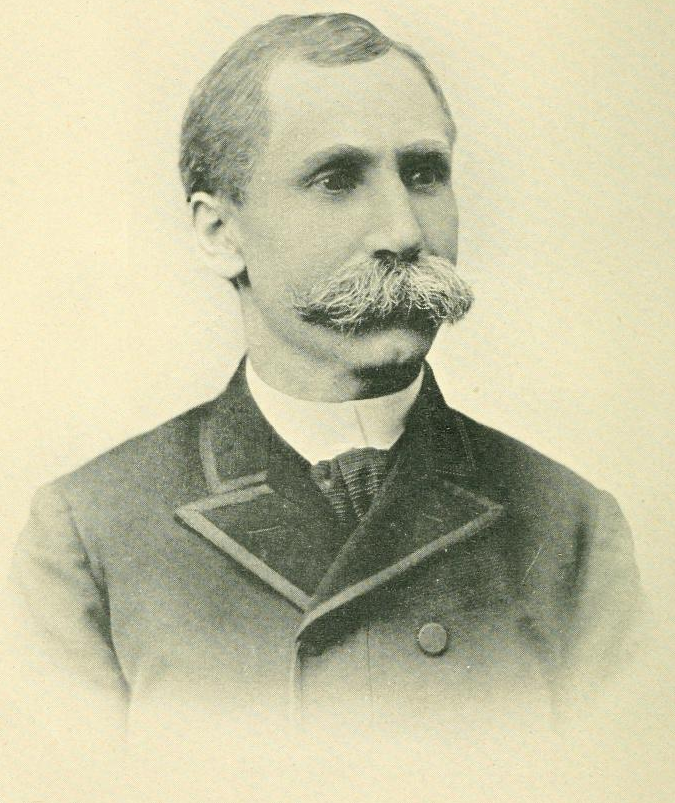
- Born: December 16, 1846; Truro, England
- Died: October 23, 1922 (aged 75); Cook County, Illinois
- Occupations: Priest, physician

Thomas Henry Truro Bray LL.D. (December 16, 1846 – October 23, 1922) was an English-American priest, philosopher and physician.

== Biography ==
Bray was born in Truro, England. He moved to America in 1863. He was educated at Northwestern University. He obtained his B.A. (1875) and M.A. (1878) from Victoria University, Toronto, his L.L.B (1883) from University of Michigan and M.D. (1902) from Hahnemann Medical College. He qualified LL.D. from Victoria University in 1885. Bray was a Deacon and Episcopal priest in Canton, Missouri and a Rector in Boonville, Missouri. In 1889, Bray resigned from the church in St. Louis. He left the Episcopal Church because of his growing disbelief in the supernatural doctrines of religion and his disgust with the practices of church men. He documented his experiences in his book The Evolution of a Life. Bray denied that Christ was an essential part of faith, denied eternal punishment and disputed the resurrection of the dead. He practiced medicine in Chicago and was a member of the American Institute of Homeopathy.

In his book Essays on God and Man, Bray defined God as a "universally extended conscious force". He stated that "there is an infinite intelligence whom we call God; man is by nature a religious being; every religion has in it a nucleus of truth; no religion is exclusively true, or founded upon an exclusively divine revelation." In his later works such as his book The Living Universe, Bray defended philosophical theism.

He married several times, to Agnes Lewarne in 1875, to Mabel Summy in 1878 and May Wormald in 1888. Bray died from prostate cancer on October 23, 1922, aged 75.

== Selected publications ==
- The Knowability of God (1887)
- Essays on God and Man (1888)
- The Evolution of a Life (1890)
- Reason and Dogma (1894)
- The Living Universe (1910, 1920)
- The Voice of the Universe (1917)
