= James Bray (cricketer, born 1790) =

English cricketer (1790–1869)

Personal information
- Born: 11 October 1790; Waldron, Sussex, England
- Died: 31 January 1869 (aged 78); Waldron, Sussex, England

Domestic team information
- Years: Team
- 1826: Kent
- 1816–1827: Sussex

Career statistics
| Competition | FC |
|---|---|
| Matches | 8 |
| Runs scored | 164 |
| Batting average | 10.93 |
| 100s/50s | 0/0 |
| Top score | 27 |
| Catches/stumpings | 5/0 |
- Source: ESPNcricinfo, 5 December 2025

James Bray (11 October 1790 – 31 January 1869) was an English cricketer who played at the beginning of the 19th century.

Bray was born at Waldron in Sussex in 1790. He was a gamekeeper by trade and played for Hawkhurst, close to the border between Sussex and Kent. He played in a total of eight historically important matches between 1816 and 1827, four of which were for Sussex. He made his important debut in 1816 for Sussex, playing against Epsom at Lord's. In 1826 he played twice for Kent against Sussex and the following year played twice for Sussex against Kent. He also played two important matches for The Bs, one in 1817 and the other, his last, in 1827.

Bray died at Waldron in 1869 aged 78.

== Bibliography ==
- Carlaw, Derek (2020). Kent County Cricketers, A to Z: Part One (1806–1914) (PDF). Cardiff: ACS.
- Haygarth, Arthur (1996) [1862]. Scores & Biographies, Volume 1 (1744–1826). Kennington: Frederick Lillywhite. ISBN 978-19-00592-23-9.
- Haygarth, Arthur (1997) [1862]. Scores & Biographies, Volume 2 (1827–1840). Kennington: Frederick Lillywhite. ISBN 978-19-00592-23-9.
