= Kevin Bray (cricketer) =

Australian cricketer (born 1968)

Personal information
- Full name: Kevin George Bray
- Born: 24 September 1968 (age 58); Newcastle, New South Wales, Australia
- Batting: Right-handed
- Bowling: Right-arm fast-medium

Domestic team information
- Years: Team
- 1999-2001: Warwickshire Cricket Board

Career statistics
Competition	LA
Matches	5
Runs scored	54
Batting average	13.50
100s/50s	–/–
Top score	36
Balls bowled	197
Wickets	4
Bowling average	26.25
5 wickets in innings	–
10 wickets in match	–
Best bowling	2/15
Catches/stumpings	–/–
- Source: Cricinfo, 27 October 2010

Kevin George Bray (born 24 September 1968) is a former Australian cricketer. Bray was a right-handed batsman who bowled right-arm fast-medium. He was born at Newcastle, New South Wales.

Bray represented NSW Country from 1989 to 1992, playing against West Indies and India on their 1991 tours, and Australia Country in 1992 against India.

Bray represented the Warwickshire Cricket Board in List A cricket. His debut List A match came against Berkshire in the 1999 NatWest Trophy. From 1999 to 2001, he represented the Board in 4 List A matches, the last of which came against Lancashire in the 2001 Cheltenham & Gloucester Trophy. In his 4 List A matches, he scored 54 runs at a batting average of 13.50, with a high score of 36. With the ball he took 4 wickets at a bowling average of 26.25, with best figures of 2/15.
