= Bill Bray (rugby league) =

Australian rugby league footballer (1917–1988)

Personal information
- Full name: William Bray

Playing information
- Position: Prop
Club
Years	Team	Pld	T	G	FG	P
1947–48	Eastern Suburbs	26	4	0	0	12

William Bray (10 June 1917 – 17 June 1988) was an Australian rugby league footballer in what was New South Wales' major rugby league competition at the time, the New South Wales Rugby Football League premiership. He played 26 matches, all for the Eastern Suburbs club in the years 1946–1948, scoring four tries in 1947.
