= James Bray (cricketer, born 1853) =

English cricketer (1853–1898)

Personal information
- Born: 18 January 1853; Limehouse, London
- Died: 30 August 1898 (aged 45); St Pancras, London
- Batting: Right-handed
- Bowling: Right-arm medium
- Role: Bowler

Domestic team information
- Years: Team
- 1879–1882: Kent
- 1887: Essex
- FC debut: 16 June 1879 Kent v Yorkshire
- Last FC: 24 July 1882 Kent v Surrey

Career statistics
Competition	First-class
Matches	22
Runs scored	74
Batting average	2.74
100s/50s	0/0
Top score	9
Balls bowled	4,197
Wickets	87
Bowling average	16.82
5 wickets in innings	6
10 wickets in match	1
Best bowling	8/103
Catches/stumpings	16/–
- Source: Cricinfo, 8 March 2017

James Bray (18 January 1853 – 30 August 1898) was an English professional cricketer. He played 22 first-class matches for Kent County Cricket Club between 1879 and 1882.

== Early life ==
Bray was almost certainly born at Limehouse in London in 1853. Some sources give his birthplace as Sandwich in Kent, (Note: Bray's birth place is given as Sandwich in Scores and Biographies, the 1907 History of Kent Cricket and in the 1880–81 edition of Lillywhite's Cricketer's Annual, all of which are contemporary sources. To have played for Kent he was required at the time to have either been born in the county or be qualified after a period of two years residence, and Derek Carlaw speculates that Bray gave his birth place as Sandwich to be able to play for Kent.) but this is probably the birthplace of his father, also James, who worked as a "hammer man" for a blacksmith. Bray grew up in London, living at Mile End with his mother Mary, by this time a widow, at the 1871 census, and the family later lived at Bow.

== Career ==
In 1879 Bray was spotted bowling in the nets at Lord's by Kent player George Hearne―sources say in his "dinner hour". He made his debut for Kent in June of the same year in a match against Yorkshire at Sheffield. Although he was wicketless in Yorkshire's first innings, he took a five-wicket haul in the second innings, taking five wickets for the cost of 35 runs (5/35). He repeated the feat in both of his next two matches, taking 5/62 against Lancashire and 5/24 against Sussex, and was Kent's leading wicket-taker of the season, with 49 wickets in 1879 at a bowling average of 15.18 runs per wicket in the 11 first-class matches he played. (Note: Kent played 13 first-class matches in 1879. Bray did not play in the first two mathches and was then ever-present.) This included nine wickets in the return match against Sussex and 8/103 in an innings against Surrey at The Oval.

A short man, (Note: Bray gave his height as 5 feet 6 inches (1.68 m), although that is considered to have been a generous figure and he is thought to have been shorter.) described as "an extraordinary little terrier of a man" by Lord Harris and as "the shortest man I have ever seen on a cricket field" by Charles Igglesden, Bray bowled right-arm medium pace deliveries using a roundarm bowling style. He was described as "capable of turning the ball both ways" and was an accurate bowler. After playing in 11 of Kent's first-class matches in 1879 his career quickly declined. He played seven times in 1880, (Note: Kent played 12 first-class matches in 1880. Bray had fallen out of the team by the middle of August.) taking 24 wickets, and only twice in each of 1881 and 1882. He was described as having "not helped the county for some time" when he took ten-wickets in a match in against Sussex in 1882―his only ten-wicket haul― playing in a Kent team which Cricket magazine wrote suffered from "the want of a good bowler". He played only once more for Kent and his first-class career ended with a total of 87 wickets taken in his 22 matches. A poor batsman, he scored only 74 runs in his first-class career, with a highest score of just nine.

Following his rapid rise to prominence, Bray was employed as a professional coach at Eton College and at Cambridge University in 1880. He played club cricket in the Limehouse area in the early 1880s, and in 1883 took all ten wickets playing for Darwen Cricket Club against Werneth in Lancashire, at which point he was described as "the whilom (Note: Whilom means "former" or "erstwhile".) Kent bowler". From 1884 he was the professional at Beckton Cricket Club. He qualified to play for Essex County Cricket Club, and in 1887 appeared twice for their team before it was granted first-class status, although he took only four wickets for them.

== Later life ==
Bray was listed as working as a general labourer in the 1891 census. He died at St Pancras in London in 1898 aged 45.

== Bibliography ==
- Carlaw, Derek (2020). Kent County Cricketers, A to Z: Part One (1806–1914) (PDF). Cardiff: ACS.
