= William M. Bray =

American politician from Wisconsin (1880–1964)

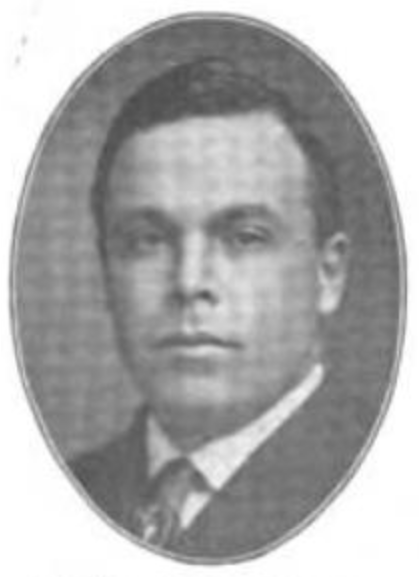

Member of the Wisconsin State Senate
- In office 1914–1918

Member of the Wisconsin State Assembly
- In office 1908–1910
- Constituency: Winnebago County First District

Personal details
- Born: March 17, 1880 Oshkosh, Wisconsin, US
- Died: March 15, 1964 (aged 83) Klamath Falls, Oregon, US
- Party: Republican
- Occupation: Politician

William M. Bray (March 17, 1880 – March 15, 1964) was a member of the Wisconsin State Assembly and the Wisconsin State Senate.

== Biography ==
Bray was born on March 17, 1880, in Oshkosh, Wisconsin. He attended Northwestern University and Harvard University and became involved in the lumber business.

He died in Klamath Falls, Oregon, on March 15, 1964.

== Political career ==
Bray was a member of the Assembly in 1908. He was elected to the Senate in 1914. He was a Republican.
