= William Bray (priest) =

English Anglican priest (died 1644)

William Bray (died 1644) was an English priest, chaplain to William Laud, Archbishop of Canterbury. As licenser of publications of John Pocklington, he was drawn into Pocklington's case before the Long Parliament.

== Life ==
He matriculated at Trinity College, Cambridge in 1613, moving to Christ's College, where he graduated Bachelor of Arts (BA) in 1617, Cambridge Master of Arts (MA Cantab) in 1620, and Bachelor of Divinity (BD) in 1631. At the outset of his clerical career he was a popular lecturer in puritan London, but changing his views he became one of William Laud, Archbishop of Canterbury,'s chaplains in ordinary, and obtained considerable church preferment. He was rector of St Ethelburga, London, 5 May 1632; prebendary of Mapesbury in St Paul's Cathedral, 12 June following; and vicar of St Martin-in-the-Fields, 2 March 1633. The king presented him, on 7 May 1634, to the vicarage of Chaldon-Herring in Dorset, and in 1638 bestowed on him a canonry in Canterbury Cathedral.

He had licensed two Laudian books by John Pocklington, on the Sabbath and church ritual; the Long Parliament required him to preach a recantation sermon at St Margaret's, Westminster. On 12 January 1643 Parliament proceeded to sequester him from the vicarage of St Martin's, and at the end of March following his books were seized; he was also imprisoned, plundered, and forced to flee from London to remote parts of the country, where, it is said, he died in 1644.

His recantation sermon was published with the title: A Sermon of the Blessed Sacrament of the Lord's Supper; proving that there is therein no proper sacrifice now offered; Together with the disapproving of sundry passages in 2 Bookes set forth by Dr. Pocklington; the one called Altare Christianum, the other Sunday no Sabbath: Formerly printed with Licence. Now published by Command,' London, 1641.

== Sources ==
- This article incorporates text from a publication now in the public domain: "Bray, William (d.1644)". Dictionary of National Biography. London: Smith, Elder & Co. 1885–1900.
