= James H. Bray =

American psychologist (born 1954)

- Born: February 12, 1954 (age 72); Pasadena, Texas, U.S.
- Education: University of Houston
- Scientific career
- Fields: Psychology
- Workplaces: University of Texas San Antonio; Baylor College of Medicine; Texas Woman's University

James H. Bray (born February 12, 1954) is an American clinical and family psychologist and a past president of the American Psychological Association (APA). Bray is professor and former chair of the Department of Psychology at University of Texas San Antonio (2017-present). Previously he was an associate professor in the Department of Family and Community Medicine at Baylor College of Medicine (1987-2017). He is also chairman of the Department of Social and Behavioral Sciences at the University of Houston College of Medicine (2023-2024).

== Career ==
Bray earned an undergraduate degree from the University of Houston, followed by an MA and a PhD from the same institution. He also attended the University of California Santa Barbara and the University of Hawaii. While at Hawaii he played on UH college football team. Bray completed postdoctoral training in family therapy and research. He joined the faculty at Texas Woman's University (TWU) in Houston shortly thereafter. He is the former chairman of the Psychology Department at the University of Texas San Antonio. He runs the Family Psychology Health Laboratory at UTSA.

In 1984, Bray developed the Personal Authority in the Family System Questionnaire (PAFSQ) with two other investigators. He was the project director and principal investigator at the Baylor College of Medicine (BCM) Screening, Brief Intervention, and Referral to Treatment (SBIRT) Medical Residency Program for substance abuse. He is an associate professor emeritus at BCM. He has also completed groundbreaking research on the collaboration between family physicians and psychologists.

He conducted groundbreaking research on the impact of divorce and remarriage on children's development. The Developmental Issues in Stepfamilies Project was supported by grants from the National Institutes of Health and resulted in many influential publications on divorce, remarriage and stepfamilies. The book Stepfamilies: Love, Marriage and Parenting in the First Decade summarized his study for both professional and lay audiences. It was published by Broadway Books in 1998.

His other influential research includes the Baylor Adolescent Alcohol Project, supported by the National Institutes of Health. The long-term study examined family relationships, parenting, and peer influences on adolescent alcohol and substance use from 6th through 12th grades.

In 2009, Bray served as president of the APA after being involved in the organization's leadership for many years. Bray's presidential initiatives focused on the future of psychology practice, advancing psychological science as a STEM discipline and the psychological factors associated with homelessness. Previously, he had been president of Division 43 of the APA, the Society for Family Psychology. In addition, he served as treasurer for several APA divisions and has been made a fellow of 12 APA divisions.

== Works ==
- Bray, James; Stanton, Mark, eds. (2009). The Wiley-Blackwell Handbook of Family Psychology. John Wiley & Sons. ISBN 9781405169943.
- Bray, James H.; Kelly, John (1999). Stepfamilies: Love, Marriage and Parenting in the First Decade. Crown Publishing Group. ISBN 9780767901031.
- Bray, James H.; Maxwell, Scott E., eds. (1985). Multivariate Analysis of Variance. SAGE Publications. ISBN 9780803923102.
