= Henry Bray (footballer) =

Australian rules footballer (1891–1966)

Personal information
- Full name: Henry Arthur Bray
- Born: 13 June 1891; North Melbourne, Victoria
- Died: 22 March 1966 (aged 74); Heidelberg, Victoria
- Original team: Barwon

Playing career^{1}
Years	Club	Games (Goals)
1911	St Kilda	1 (0)
- ^{1} Playing statistics correct to the end of 1911.

Henry Arthur Bray (13 June 1891 – 22 March 1966) was an Australian rules footballer who played with St Kilda in the Victorian Football League (VFL).
