= Joe Bray =

Australian rules footballer (1886–1955)

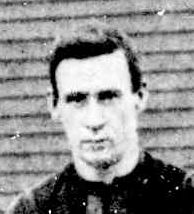

Personal information
- Full name: Joseph Michael Bray
- Born: 26 October 1886; Richmond, Victoria
- Died: 22 July 1955 (aged 68); Glen Iris, Victoria
- Original team: Howe Crescent Wesleys

Playing career^{1}
Years	Club	Games (Goals)
1908	Melbourne	3 (0)
- ^{1} Playing statistics correct to the end of 1908.

Joseph Michael Bray (26 October 1886 – 22 July 1955) was an Australian rules footballer who played with Melbourne in the Victorian Football League (VFL).
