= Charles Bray (glass artist) =

British artist (1922–2012)

- Charles Bray
- Born: 1922; Salford, Lancashire, England
- Died: 22 July 2012 (aged 89–90)
- Style: painter and glass sculptor

Charles Bray (1922 – 22 July 2012) was a British painter and glass sculptor. He was born in Salford, Lancashire, England.

== Early years ==
He was brought up, an only child, in a two-up-two-down terraced house, in Salford, where his father worked as a lorry driver. A strong artistic influence came through his mother, who was musical and his maternal great-grandfather, a stonemason. He failed the scholarship exam for Grammar school, but became top of his secondary school, Halton Bank School, by the age of 13. He later attended Openshaw Technical College and studied to belong to the Society of Designer Craftsmen. He began employment with a firm of church furnishers.

When he turned 18, Charles Bray joined the Royal Navy, at the start of World War II, and served on HMS Rodney and HMS Diomede. After the end of the war, he attended Freckleton Teacher training college, under the Emergency Teacher Training Scheme, set up after the implementation of the Education Act 1944.

== Teaching ==
He taught for two years in Manchester, specialising in music, woodwork and metalwork and then entered Goldsmiths College to study painting and sculpture. Upon returning to teach at Manchester, Charles Bray then moved to Cumberland (Cumbria) in 1955, to teach art at Eden School, Carlisle. He married Margaret Ingram, a textile artist (who died in 1995). In 1962, Charles Bray worked at Sunderland Teacher Training College, and then became Head of Ceramic Art at Sunderland College of Art. Charles Bray set up courses on ceramic glazes for teachers, and established a glass degree course at SCA. In 1976, he attended the Hot Glass Conference at the Royal College of Art which proved a major watershed in the development of Studio Glass in England. Subsequently, he was instrumental in setting up British Artists in Glass (now the Contemporary Glass Society) to promote and support the work of glass artists in the UK.

== Art career ==
Tall Panel - Charles Bray. Glass, steel and local stone garden sculpture.

Charles Bray drew influence from form and line observed from naval objects, and by the artists Ben Nicholson and Henry Moore. This is evident in his prolific paintings and drawings. Later influences from the Cumbria landscape, and rock strata, were instrumental in a change of artistic direction. His glass work demonstrates this influence. Charles Bray's glass work can be classed in two groups. The first consists of blown bowls, etched with shapes reflecting landscape influences. Secondly, nature plays a strong influence in his glass sculpture, much of which is experimental and varied. He continued to produce and exhibit glass until his death in July 2012.

== Honours and publications ==
Charles Bray was a Fellow of the Society of Glass Technology a Fellow of the University of Sunderland and a Fellow of the Royal Society of Arts. He was the author of important glass art and glass technology reference books including A Dictionary of Glass, Ceramics & Glass – A Basic Technology and Glass Blowing. The British Library Sound Archive, London, holds an extensive and informative recorded interview with Charles Bray, conducted by Hawksmoor Hughes, on 23 October 2007. Art historian Robert Roper has published Charles Bray's biography and images of his work.

== Exhibitions and collections ==
Charles Bray has exhibited in Britain, Europe and the United States. Private collectors of his work include Margrethe II of Denmark, and ex-king Constantine II of Greece. His work is in a number of public collections some of which are:

- Turner Museum of Glass, Sheffield.
- Musee du Verre , Sars Poteries.
- Shipley Art Gallery, Gateshead.
- Salford City Art Gallery , Salford.
- Crystalex, Novy Bor , Czechoslovakia.
- Corning Museum of Glass, New York.
- Kelvingrove Art Gallery and Museum, Glasgow.
- Royal Scottish Museum, Edinburgh.
- Ulster Museum, Belfast.
