= William Bray (cricketer) =

New Zealand cricketer (1879–1960)

Personal information
- Born: 1879; Avoca, Victoria, Australia
- Died: 1960 (aged 80–81); Melbourne, Australia
- Source: Cricinfo, 23 October 2020

William Bray (1879–1960) was a New Zealand cricketer. He played in five first-class matches for Wellington from 1914 to 1921.

== See also ==
- List of Wellington representative cricketers
