= James Bray (councillor) =

English merchant and politician in Virginia (1609–1691)

Member of the House of Burgesses for James City County, Colony of Virginia
- In office 1688–1691 Serving with Philip Ludwell, Daniel Parke
- Preceded by: Thomas Ballard
- Succeeded by: Henry Duke

Member of the Virginia Governor's Council
- In office 1670–1679

Personal details
- Born: July 7, 1609 Great Barrington, Gloucestershire, England
- Died: October 24, 1691 (aged 82) Williamsburg, Virginia, English America
- Resting place: Bruton Parish Church
- Spouse: Angelica
- Children: 4, including James Jr.
- Occupation: Attorney; merchant; planter; politician

James Bray (July 7, 1609 – October 24, 1691) was an English merchant who also became an attorney, planter and politician in the Colony of Virginia, serving nearly a decade on the Virginia Governor's Council through Bacon's Rebellion (1670-1679), and later representing James City County in the House of Burgesses, although unseated when he refused to make a loyalty oath.

== Early life ==
Born in Great Barrington, England on July 7, 1609, he may have studied law before working for a London mercantile house. He married the widow Angelica Fisher by August 24, 1658, who bore at least three sons (James Jr., Thomas and David) and daughter Ann during their marriage.

== Career ==
Coat of Arms of Janes Bray

By November, 1657, Bray was in the Virginia colony, and practicing law in the courts of James City County, New Kent County and York County. By 1674 he was performing many tasks for Jamestown merchant George Lee.

Bray patented 1,250 acres in New Kent County by 1657, and 100 acres the next year using his wife for the headright. By 1671 Bray acquired 290 acres at Middle Plantation (the future Williamsburg) at the head of Archer's Hope (later College) Creek on the boundary between York and James City Counties. By his death, Bray owned land in Middle Plantation, as well as in Charles City and New Kent counties.

Bray became an undersheriff in York County in 1658, and despite being arrested for uncivil wrangling and rude deportment in the York County Court in 1662, by 1672 he was a justice of the peace for James City County (the justices jointly administering the county in that era). Bray, Thomas Ballard and Joseph Bridger received appointments to the Virginia Governor's Council on March 3, 1675, and sworn into office the following day. All three became important allies of Governor William Berkeley during Bacon's Rebellion the following year. Although some claim Bray signed one of Nathaniel Bacon's declarations in August 1676, neither extant copy contains his signature. When Bacon began fortifying the colony's capital at Jamestown in September, he forced Angelica Bray and the wives of other Berkeley supporters to stand on the ramparts to shield his workmen. After the rebellion was crushed, Governor Berkeley held a court martial of one of Bacon's key supporters, William Drummond, at Bray's home on January 20, 1677, before ordering Drummond hanged the next day.

Berkeley's successor Herbert Jeffreys recommended that Bray, Philip Ludwell and Thomas Ballard be removed from the Governor's Council in March 1679, so Bray resumed his legal practice. Clients included Daniel Parke and William Byrd (1652-1704).

James City County voters elected Bray as one of their representatives in the House of Burgesses in 1688 and he immediately became chairman of the important Committee for Public Claims. He also was elected to the assembly that met in April 1691, but he and burgess-elect Arthur Allen II refused to take the oath of allegiance to William and Mary (presumably because of a previous loyalty oath to King James II). Bray feigned sickness until formally refusing to take the oath on May 18 (three days before the assembly adjourned) and was declared ineligible.

== Death and legacy ==
Bray died on October 24, 1691, and was buried in the Bruton churchyard, since he had served as a vestryman since at least 1674. Although his last will and testament was lost, sections were preserved in various litigation transcripts. His son James Bray Jr. served in the House of Burgesses as well as engaged in the slave trade, and was likewise known for his quarrelsome demeanor. His brother David Bray sold part of the Middle Plantation property he had inherited to the colony, in order to establish the colony's capitol away from Jamestown, notorious for its unhealthy climate, particularly in summers. His grandson, also David Bray, would be named to the Governor's Council on June 12, 1731, but died sixteen days before the council reconvened in October, and so never served.
