= Caroline Bray =

British writer (1814–1905)

Caroline Bray, known as Cara Bray, née Hennell (4 June 1814 – 21 February 1905) was a British writer of children's stories and school textbooks. With her husband Charles Bray, she was a Freethinker and friend of George Eliot.

== Life ==
Portrait of George Eliot, based on a watercolour drawing by Caroline Bray

Hennell was born in 1814. She was a daughter of the Unitarian family of James and Elizabeth Hennell (born Marshall). Her mother had been born in Loughborough in the East Midlands in 1778 and had the maiden name of Marshall. Her father was born in 1778 and he had become a partner in the Manchester merchants of Fazy & Co. Cara's eldest sister was Mary and another sister was Sara Hennell. The sisters are considered to be the basis for the fictional Meyrick family in George Eliot's 1876 novel Daniel Deronda.

In 1836, Hennell married Charles Bray. Caroline's uncle, Samuel Hennell, manufactured ribbons in Coventry as did the family of Charles Bray. After her marriage to Bray, an enthusiastic skeptic, her brother Charles Hennell reviewed the evidences for Christian beliefs with the aim of parrying his brother-in-law's arguments. The result of the examination was that he became a sceptic himself, and in 1838 published an Enquiry concerning the Origin of Christianity in defence of his conclusions. In 1841 Charles Bray published The Philosophy of Necessity and this included as an appendix written by her sister Mary.

Cara Bray was a good friend to George Eliot and the National Portrait Gallery contains portraits of George Eliot and her father which are watercolours by Bray.

Bray wrote several books and text books for children including Physiology for Common Schools which explained the human body and its care to school children. She was also an active supporter of the Society for the Prevention of Cruelty to Animals in Coventry. Cara Bray died in Coventry and was buried there in 1905.

A portrait of Caroline Bray by Ethel Martin (1873–1969) is in the Herbert Art Gallery and Museum.

== Works ==
- Physiology for Common Schools, 1860
- Our Duty to Animals, 1871
- Richard Barton; or, The Wounded Bird, 1873
- Paul Bradley. A village tale inculcating kindness to animals, 1876
- Little Mop and other stories, 1886
- Branded: or the sins of the Fathers shall be visited on the children, 1888
