= Edward Bray (businessman) =

English businessman and cricketer (1874–1950)

Sir Edward Hugh Bray CSI (15 April 1874 – 27 November 1950) was a British businessman and English first-class cricketer active 1895–97 who played for Middlesex and Cambridge University. He was born in Kensington; died in Rye, Sussex. A temporary brigadier-general in the Indian Defence Force, he was a son of Sir Edward Bray.

On 12 September 1919 Bray was made a Companion of the Order of the Star of India for meritorious service in connection with the war in India.
