= Charlie Bray (cricketer) =

English cricketer and journalist (1898–1993)

Personal information
- Born: 6 April 1898; Brighton, Sussex, England
- Died: 12 September 1993 (aged 95); Bedford, England
- Batting: Right-handed
- Role: Batsman
- Relatives: Leslie Bray (brother)

Domestic team information
- Years: Team
- 1927–1937: Essex

Career statistics
Competition	FC
Matches	95
Runs scored	3474
Batting average	24.81
100s/50s	5/13
Top score	129
Balls bowled	197
Wickets	2
Bowling average	52.00
5 wickets in innings	0
10 wickets in match	0
Best bowling	1/1
Catches/stumpings	54
- Source: Cricinfo, 21 July 2013

Charles Bray (6 April 1898 – 12 September 1993) was an English cricketer and journalist. (Note: Both CricketArchive and Cricinfo give his name as "Charlie Bray". However the profile accompanying his Cricinfo entry refers to him as "Charles Bray", and that was the name that he used for his book and his journalism. It is unclear which was his birth name.)

Bray played for Essex between 1927 and 1937. His highest score was 129, saving the match after Essex followed on against the New Zealanders in 1931. He captained the county intermittently and later wrote the volume Essex from 'The County Cricket Series' published in 1950 by Convoy Publications Ltd.

He wrote for the Daily Herald from 1935 to 1964, and subsequently as a freelance for The Sun, covering cricket and rugby union. For his work as a war correspondent during the Second World War he was mentioned in despatches. He was chairman of the Cricket Writers' Club in 1953. His brother, Leslie Bray, also played first-class cricket.
