= Charles Bray =

British industrialist and philanthropist (1811–1884)

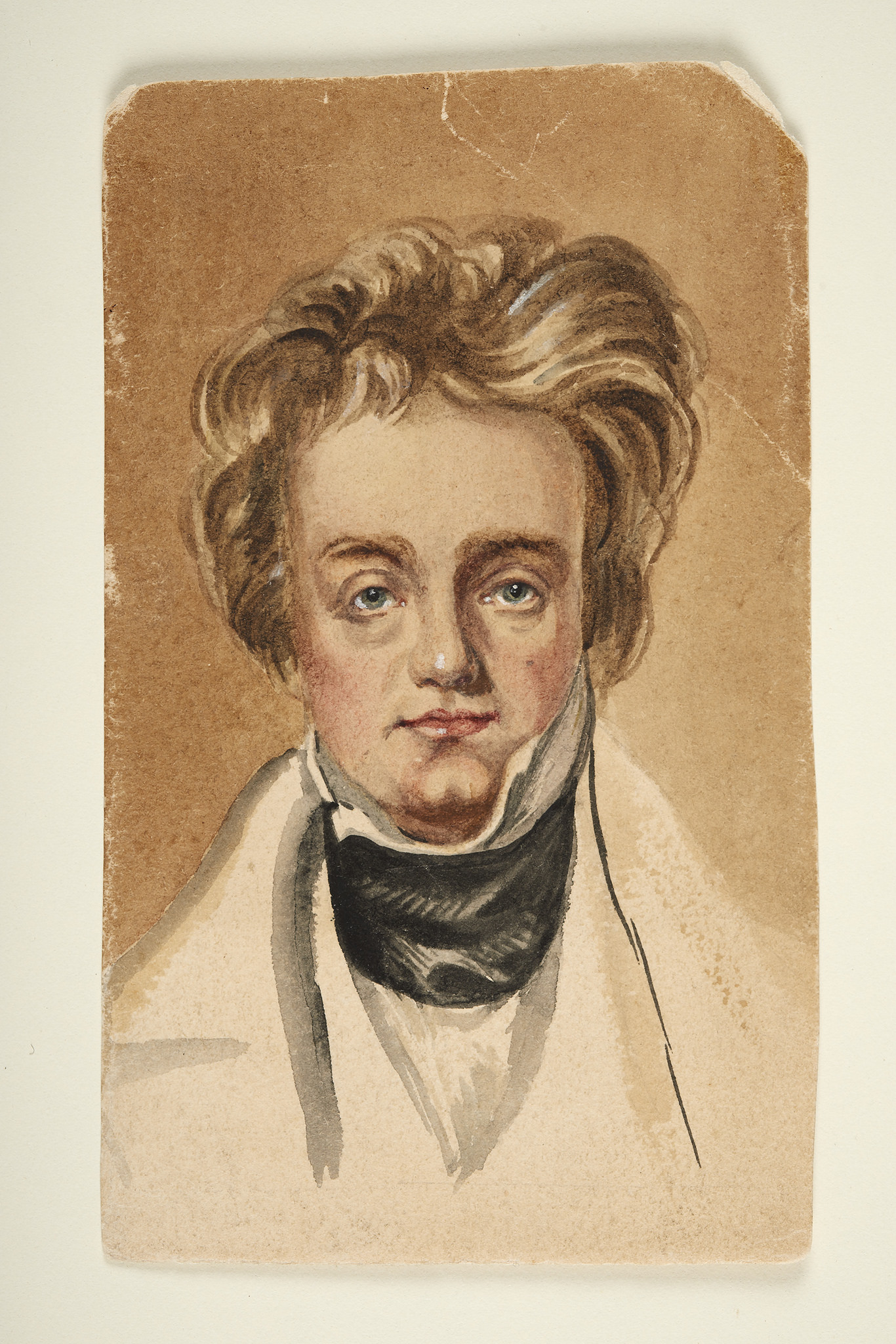
- Born: 31 January 1811; Coventry, England
- Died: 5 October 1884 (aged 73)
- Occupations: ribbon manufacturer philosopher

Charles Bray (31 January 1811 – 5 October 1884) was a prosperous British ribbon manufacturer, social reformer, philanthropist, philosopher, and phrenologist.

== Life ==
Bray was born in 1811 and his education included time in the school run by Mary Franklin. He would have attended chapel every day.

Bray became a prosperous ribbon manufacturer who owned the Coventry Herald newspaper. His father had died in 1835, leaving him and each of his seven siblings a substantial inheritance. Charles married Caroline "Cara" Hennell (4 June 1814 – 21 February 1905) on 26 May 1836 at Hackney in Middlesex. A disciple of the social reformer Robert Owen, he used the wealth generated from his businesses to establish nonsectarian public schools and to try to bring about changes in society.

Bray was a pantheist who argued that God cannot be separated from nature. He held that the universe is ruled by a power appearing as "Light, Heat, Electricity, Galvanism, Chemical Affinity, Attraction and Repulsions" and in total as "one simple, primordial, absolute Force." His type of pantheism attempted to reconcile matter and mind. Bray's God has been described as a non-Christian pantheistic force.

Bray was a freethinker in religious matters and a progressive in politics. He was also a disciple of the phrenologist George Combe (1788–1858).

== Rosehill Circle ==
The Brays' home "Rosehill" (in Coventry, Warwickshire) was a haven for people who held and debated radical views. People who participated in the "Rosehill Circle" included (among many others) social reformer Robert Owen, philosopher/sociologist Herbert Spencer, Harriet Martineau, and transcendentalist Ralph Waldo Emerson. Most of the people who participated in the Rosehill Circle tended to have theologies that were considerably more liberal than the average (for example, many participants cast doubt on the supernatural elements of Bible stories).

The core group of the Rosehill Circle consisted of Charles Bray, his wife Caroline, and some of the members of Caroline's immediate family along with several of their close friends. The core group members from Caroline's immediate family were her sisters Mary Hennell (23 May 1802 – 16 May 1843) and Sara Hennell (1812–1899), and her brother Charles Christian Hennell (1809–1850). Charles Hennell was a writer on theological and philosophical topics whose most important work was An Inquiry Concerning the Origin of Christianity (London, 1838). Although Caroline's father James Hennell (8 October 1782 – 30 January 1816) was a devout Unitarian who raised his children as Unitarians, his 3 children who were core members of the Rosehill Circle all entertained serious reservations about many Unitarian beliefs.

On 1 November 1843 Charles C. Hennell married Elizabeth Rebecca "Rufa" Brabant (28 September 1811 – 1 March 1898), another core member of the Rosehill Circle. Elizabeth's father, physician Robert Herbert Brabant (14 November 1781 – 13 May 1866), was a core member as well. Elizabeth, in the months immediately preceding her engagement and marriage to Charles Hennell, had been under commission (by a private group associated with the Rosehill Circle) to translate into English the great theological treatise Das Leben Jesu, kritisch bearbeitet by David Friedrich Strauss (1808–1874). As soon as it had been first published (in Tübingen, Germany – vol. 1 in 1835, and vol. 2 in 1836), Strauss' Das Leben Jesu was recognized internationally as one of the most revolutionary and important theological treatises of the 19th century. Not surprisingly, the members of the private group which had commissioned the translation, led by the radical politician Joseph Parkes (1796–1865), were very eager to be able to read this great work in their native English. However, once it was realized that Elizabeth's marriage would mean an end to her translation work, in January 1844 it was decided that Mary Anne Evans (1819–1880) (later known as the novelist George Eliot) would take up the translating where Elizabeth had left off at the time of her marriage (which was about halfway through volume 1 of Das Leben Jesu). Mary Anne had quickly become an integral part of the Rosehill Circle after she met and befriended Charles and Caroline Hennell in November 1841. Somewhat later she became an intimate friend of Elizabeth Brabant as well (Mary Anne served as a bridesmaid at Elizabeth's wedding in 1843). Mary Anne worked on the translation of Strauss' Das Leben Jesu (fourth German edition, 2 vols., 1840) for over 2 years, and in June 1846 the fruit of her (and Elizabeth's) labor was finally published (as an anonymous translation) under the title The Life of Jesus, Critically Examined (3 vols., London: Chapman Brothers, 1846).

As a leading light in the Coventry 'intelligentsia,' Bray helped to found The Coventry Labourers' and Artizans' Co-operative circa 1840–60, which provided gardens for working men and a co-op store. Inspired by the cottage factories in Coventry, he drew up a plan for a small community based on the same system – squares of 3–400 houses, each with their own steam engine to provide power and would be surrounded by enough land for each house to have its own allotment.

== Publications ==
(for the most part, only First Editions are listed below)

- 1836 – The Education of the Body : An Address to the Working Classes (Coventry, England: Printed by H. Merridew, 1836) (26 p.)
- 1838 – The Education of the Feelings (London: Taylor & Walton, 1838) (195 p.)
- 1841 – The Philosophy of Necessity; or, The Law of Consequences; as Applicable to Mental, Moral, and Social Science (2 vols.) (London: Longman, Orme, Brown, Green and Longmans, 1841) (viii, 663 p.) (Second Edition, 1863)

[ Vol. 2 ( pp. 493–663 ) contains an anonymous, untitled Appendix by Mary Hennell (1802–1843). Mary's authorship of this Appendix is known because the Appendix was reprinted ( under the title "Social Systems and Communities" ) in a book published in 1844, and in that book the authorship of the Appendix is attributed by Charles Bray to Mary ( see the next item for a complete explanation ). ]

- 1844 – An Outline of the Various Social Systems & Communities which have been Founded on the Principle of Co-operation – With an Introductory Essay by the Author of "The Philosophy of Necessity" (London: Longman, Brown, Green, and Longmans, 1844) (cxiv, 252 p.)

[ Neither Charles Bray's nor Mary Hennell's name appears on the title page of this book, but bibliographers usually attribute the book to Mary Hennell. It is known that Charles Bray authored this book's "Preface" (pp. iii–iv) and "Introduction" (pp. v–cxiv) since Bray was the author of The Philosophy of Necessity. The work by Mary Hennell ( 1802–1843 ) which had appeared as the anonymous, untitled Appendix in vol. 2 of Bray's The Philosophy of Necessity (1841) appears in this book under the title "Social Systems and Communities" as the second part (pp. 1–252) of the book. On p. iii of this book (in the Preface) Bray reveals that Mary Hennell was the author of the Appendix in vol. 2 of his The Philosophy of Necessity. Also on p. iii of this book Bray states that Mary Hennell died of consumption in March 1843. However, other unrelated, genealogical sources exist which state that Mary Hennell died on 16 May 1843. At this time it is believed that 16 May 1843 is the correct date of Mary's death, but this has not been verified. ]

- 1844 – An Essay upon the Union of Agriculture and Manufactures : And upon the Organization of Industry (London: Longman & Co., 1844) (114 p.)
- 1844 – An outline of the various social systems & communities which have been founded on the principle of co-operation
- 1857 – The industrial employment of women : being a comparison between the condition of the people in the watch trade in Coventry, in which women are not employed, and the people in the ribbon trade
- 1866 – On Force: Its Mental and Moral Correlates
- 1871 – A Manual of anthropology: Or, the Science of Man
- 1872 – The Education of the Feelings: A Moral System, Revised and Abridged for Secular Schools
- 1873 – Illusion and Delusion: Or, Modern Pantheism versus Spiritualism
- 1879 – Psychological and Ethical Definitions on a Physiological Basis
