= Edward Bray (judge) =

English judge and cricketer (1849–1926)

Sir Edward Bray (19 August 1849 – 19 June 1926) was an English lawyer and judge who served as a judge in Birmingham and London and as Controller of Contracts in the Indian Army Headquarters during World War I. He played cricket during the 1870s.

Bray was born at Shere in Surrey in 1849, the son of Reginald Bray, a solicitor and Justice of the Peace. He was educated at Westminster School, where he played cricket in the school XI. He went on to study at Trinity College, Cambridge, where he gained cricket Blues in 1871 and 1872. Bray had already played for Surrey County Cricket Club and made his first-class cricket debut in 1870, and made a total of 30 first-class appearances between 1870 and 1879, the majority for his county side or Cambridge University.

Bray's family was descended from Thomas More, and he qualified as a barrister at Lincoln's Inn in 1875. He served as a County Court judge in Birmingham between 1905 and 1908 before returning to London as a judge at Bloomsbury and Brentford. During the First World War he served as the Controller of Contracts in the Indian Army Headquarters. He received a knighthood in the 1919 New Year Honours.

Bray's son, Sir Edward Hugh Bray, also served in India during the war and played first-class cricket for Middlesex County Cricket Club and Cambridge University. Bray died at Kensington in London in 1926 aged 76.
