= Bray =

Bray may refer to:

== Places ==
=== France ===
- Bray, Eure, in the Eure département
- Bray, Saône-et-Loire, in the Saône-et-Loire département
- Bray-Dunes, in the Nord département
- Bray-en-Val, in the Loiret département
- Bray-et-Lû, in the Val-d'Oise département
- Bray-lès-Mareuil, in the Somme département
- Bray-Saint-Christophe, in the Aisne département
- Bray-sur-Seine, in the Seine-et-Marne département
- Bray-sur-Somme, in the Somme département
- Pays de Bray, a watershed in Normandy

=== Ireland ===
- Bray, County Wicklow
  - Bray Daly railway station
  - Bray Male School, former name of Saint Cronan's Boys' National School
- Bray Head, a hill just south of Bray, Wicklow
- Bray Head, Kerry, a hill on Valentia Island, County Kerry
- Bray Lower, a townland of County Kildare
- Bray Upper, a townland of County Kildare

=== United Kingdom ===
- Bray, Berkshire, a village near Maidenhead
- Bray Shop, a village in Cornwall
- River Bray

=== United States ===
- Bray Place, a 1796 home and farmstead, Louisville, Kentucky
- Bray Township, Pennington County, Minnesota
- Brays, Missouri
- Bray, Oklahoma

=== Other places ===
- Bray, South Australia, a locality In Australia
- Bray, Wallonia, a village in the municipality of Binche, Belgium
- Bray, Botswana, a village in Kgalagadi District, Botswana
- Bray, North West, a village in the Northwest province of South Africa
- Bray Island, a Canadian Arctic islands in Nunavut, Canada

== People ==
- Bray (surname)
- Bray (musician) (born 1972), American musician and singer-songwriter
- Bray Hubbard, American football player
- Bray Lynch (born 2004), American football player
- Bray Wilkins (c.1610–1702), American colonist
- Bray Wyatt (1987–2023), American professional wrestler

== Other uses ==
- 5182 Bray, a minor planet
- Bray Castle, former name of Lewes Castle, Lewes, East Sussex, England
- Bray People, a tabloid published in Northern Ireland
- Bray Productions, an American animation studio
  - Bray Magazine (1922–1923), a theatrical cartoon series
- Bray Studios (UK), British film studio
- Bray Unknowns F.C., an Irish association football club
- Bray Wanderers A.F.C., an Irish league football (soccer) club
- Braying, the call of a donkey
- USS Bray (DE-709), a destroyer escort of the United States Navy

== See also ==
- Brae, a village on the island of Mainland in Shetland, Scotland
- Bray House (disambiguation)
- Bray Park (disambiguation)
- Braye (disambiguation)
- Brey (disambiguation)
- De Bray (disambiguation)
- People v. Bray, a 1975 case decided by the California Court of Appeal
- Vicar of Bray (disambiguation)
