= Vicar of Bray =

Vicar of Bray may refer to:

- "The Vicar of Bray" (song), an 18th-century satirical song about a quasi-fictional clergyman, to which all other uses refer
- Vicar of Bray (term), a satirical description of an individual fundamentally changing his principles to remain in ecclesiastical office as external requirements change around him
- Simon Aleyn, probably the original of the song, as Vicar of Bray, Berkshire, until he died in 1565
- The Vicar of Bray (opera), a comic opera by Edward Solomon with a libretto by Sydney Grundy first performed in 1882
- The Vicar of Bray (film), a 1937 film set in Bray, County Wicklow, Ireland
- Vicar of Bray (scientific hypothesis), an evolutionary hypothesis
- The Church of England vicar of St Michael's Church, Bray in Berkshire, England

== See also ==
- George Orwell's essay A Good Word for the Vicar of Bray
