= Sex du Coeur =

Mountain in Switzerland

- Pointe d'Arvouin
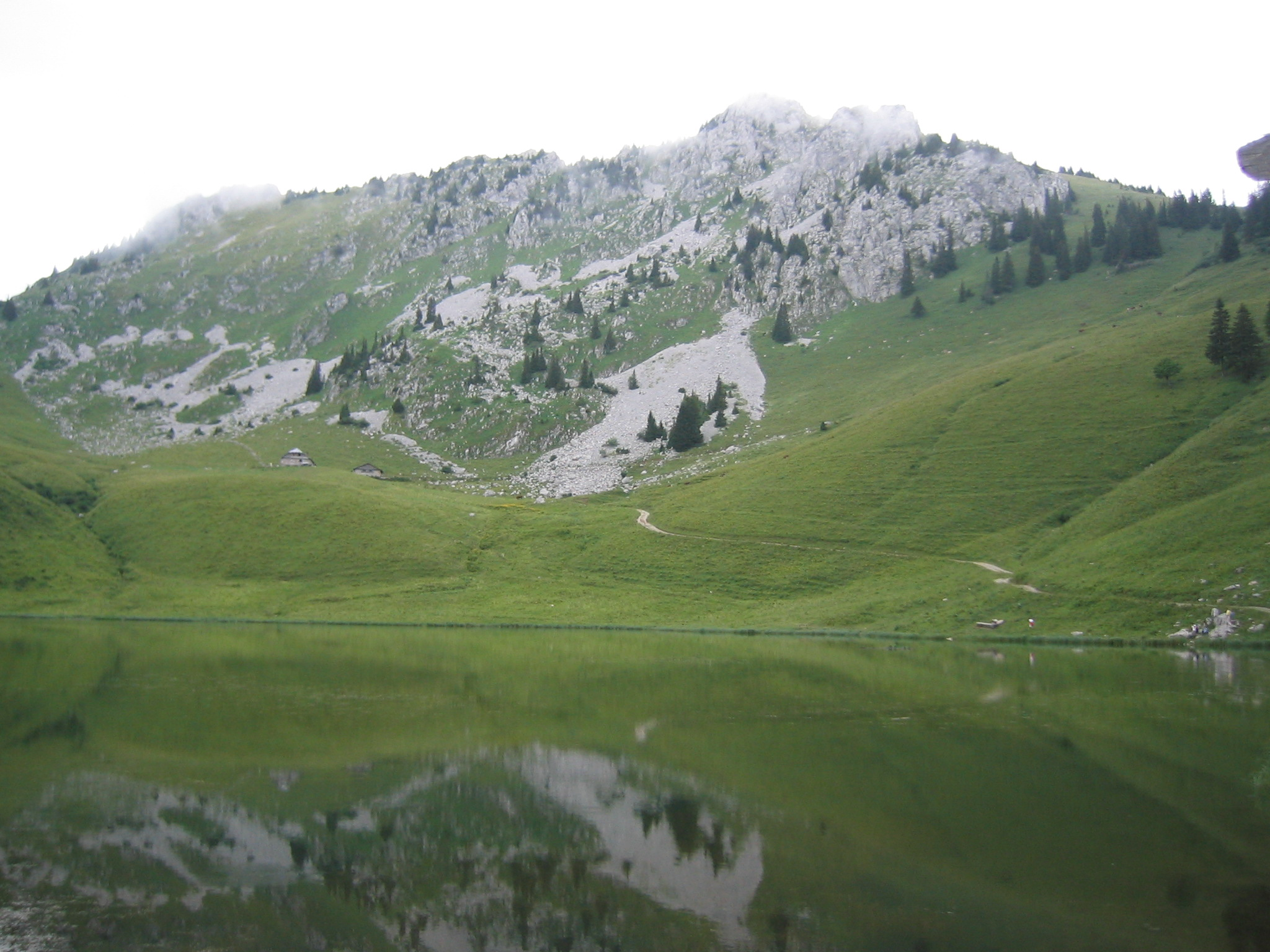
- View from Lac d'Arvouin

Highest point
- Elevation: 2,019 m (6,624 ft)
- Prominence: 154 m (505 ft)
- Parent peak: Le Linleu
- Coordinates: 46°19′14″N 6°48′25″E

Geography
- Location within Alps
- Location: Valais, Switzerland; Haute-Savoie, France
- Parent range: Chablais Alps

The Sex du Coeur (also known as Pointe d'Arvouin) is a mountain of the Chablais Alps, located on the border between Switzerland and France. It lies south of the Cornettes de Bise, between the alp of Le Coeur and the lake of Arvouin.
