= Hill–Robertson effect =

Evolutionary advantage for genetic recombination

In population genetics, the Hill–Robertson effect, or Hill–Robertson interference, is a phenomenon first identified by Bill Hill and Alan Robertson in 1966. It provides an explanation as to why there may be an evolutionary advantage to genetic recombination.

== Explanation ==
In a population of finite but effective size which is subject to natural selection, varying extents of linkage disequilibria (LD) will occur. These can be caused by genetic drift or by mutation, and they will tend to slow down the process of evolution by natural selection.

This is most easily seen by considering the case of disequilibria caused by mutation: Consider a population of individuals whose genome has only two genes, a and b. If an advantageous mutant (A) of gene a arises in a given individual, that individual's genes will through natural selection become more frequent in the population over time. However, if a separate advantageous mutant (B) of gene b arises before A has gone to fixation, and happens to arise in an individual who does not carry A, then individuals carrying B and individuals carrying A will be in competition. If recombination is present, then individuals carrying both A and B (of genotype AB) will eventually arise. Provided there are no negative epistatic effects of carrying both, individuals of genotype AB will have a greater selective advantage than aB or Ab individuals, and AB will hence go to fixation. However, if there is no recombination, AB individuals can only occur if the latter mutation (B) happens to occur in an Ab individual. The chance of this happening depends on the frequency of new mutations, and on the size of the population, but is in general unlikely unless A is already fixed, or nearly fixed. Hence one should expect the time between the A mutation arising and the population becoming fixed for AB to be much longer in the absence of recombination. Hence recombination allows evolution to progress faster. [Note: This effect is often erroneously equated with "clonal interference", which happens when A and B mutations arise in different wild type (ab) individuals and describes the ensuing competition between Ab and aB lineages.] There tends to be a correlation between the rate of recombination and the likelihood of the preferred haplotype (in the above example labeled as AB) goes into fixation in a population.

Joe Felsenstein (1974) showed this effect to be mathematically identical to the Fisher–Muller model proposed by R. A. Fisher (1930) and H. J. Muller (1932), although the verbal arguments were substantially different. Although the Hill-Robertson effect is usually thought of as describing a disproportionate buildup of fitness-reducing (relative to fitness increasing) LD over time, these effects also have immediate consequences for mean population fitness.

== See also ==
- Clonal interference
- Genetic hitchhiking
