= Bray House =

Bray House may refer to:

== Australia ==
- Bray House, in Hutt Street, Adelaide, South Australia

== United States ==
- Bray-Barron House, Eufaula, AL, listed on the NRHP in Alabama
- Bray-Valenzuela House, Tucson, AZ, listed on the NRHP in Arizona
- Bray Place, Louisville, KY, listed on the NRHP in Kentucky
- Bray House (Kittery Point, Maine), listed on the NRHP in Maine
- Taylor-Bray Farm, Yarmouth, MA, listed on the NRHP in Massachusetts
- Thomas Bray Farm, Yarmouth, MA, listed on the NRHP in Massachusetts
- Bray–Hoffman House, Annandale, NJ, listed on the NRHP in New Jersey
- Cadmus N. Bray House, Siler City, NC, listed on the NRHP in North Carolina
