= Thomas Bray (disambiguation) =

Thomas Bray (c. 1656–1730) was an Anglican clergyman.

Thomas Bray may also refer to:

- Thomas Bray (MP for Helston) for Helston
- Thomas Bray (MP for Middlesex) for Middlesex
- Thomas Bray (bishop) (1749–1820), Irish Roman Catholic prelate, Archbishop of Cashel
- Thomas Bray (canon) (1706–1785), Canon of Windsor
- Thomas J. Bray (1867–1933), American businessman
- Thom Bray (born 1954), American actor
- Tom Bray (fl. 1850–1890), American saloon-keeper and criminal
- T. J. Bray (Thomas Joseph Bray, born 1992), American basketball player

== See also ==
- Thomas Bray Farm
