= Breay =

Breay is a surname of English, specifically Devonian origin. Notable people with the surname include:

- Claire Breay (born 1968), English manuscript curator and medieval historian
- Lara Breay (fl. 2007), British film producer

== See also ==
- Brey (disambiguation)
