= A Good Word for the Vicar of Bray =

1946 essay by George Orwell

"A Good Word for the Vicar of Bray" is an essay by the English author George Orwell. In it, Orwell encourages the public-spirited action of planting trees, which may well make up for the harm people do in their lives. The essay was first published in Tribune on 26 April 1946.

== Background ==
"Vicar of Bray" is a song about a 17th-century cleric who changed his religious views from one extreme to another according to the government of the time in order to retain his living.

In 1936, Orwell took the lease of a cottage at Wallington, Hertfordshire, and moved in by 2 April, two months before his marriage. It was a very small cottage called the "Stores", with almost no modern facilities in a tiny village. He needed somewhere quiet to work on The Road to Wigan Pier, and as well as writing, he spent hours regenerating the garden.

In the preceding ten years, Orwell had seen numerous changes of political affiliation in the ideological battlegrounds of socialism, fascism, capitalism, Trotskyism and Stalinism within the wider context of the Spanish Civil War and World War II. Orwell discussed these more specifically in his more political essays such as "Second Thoughts on James Burnham".

== Summary ==
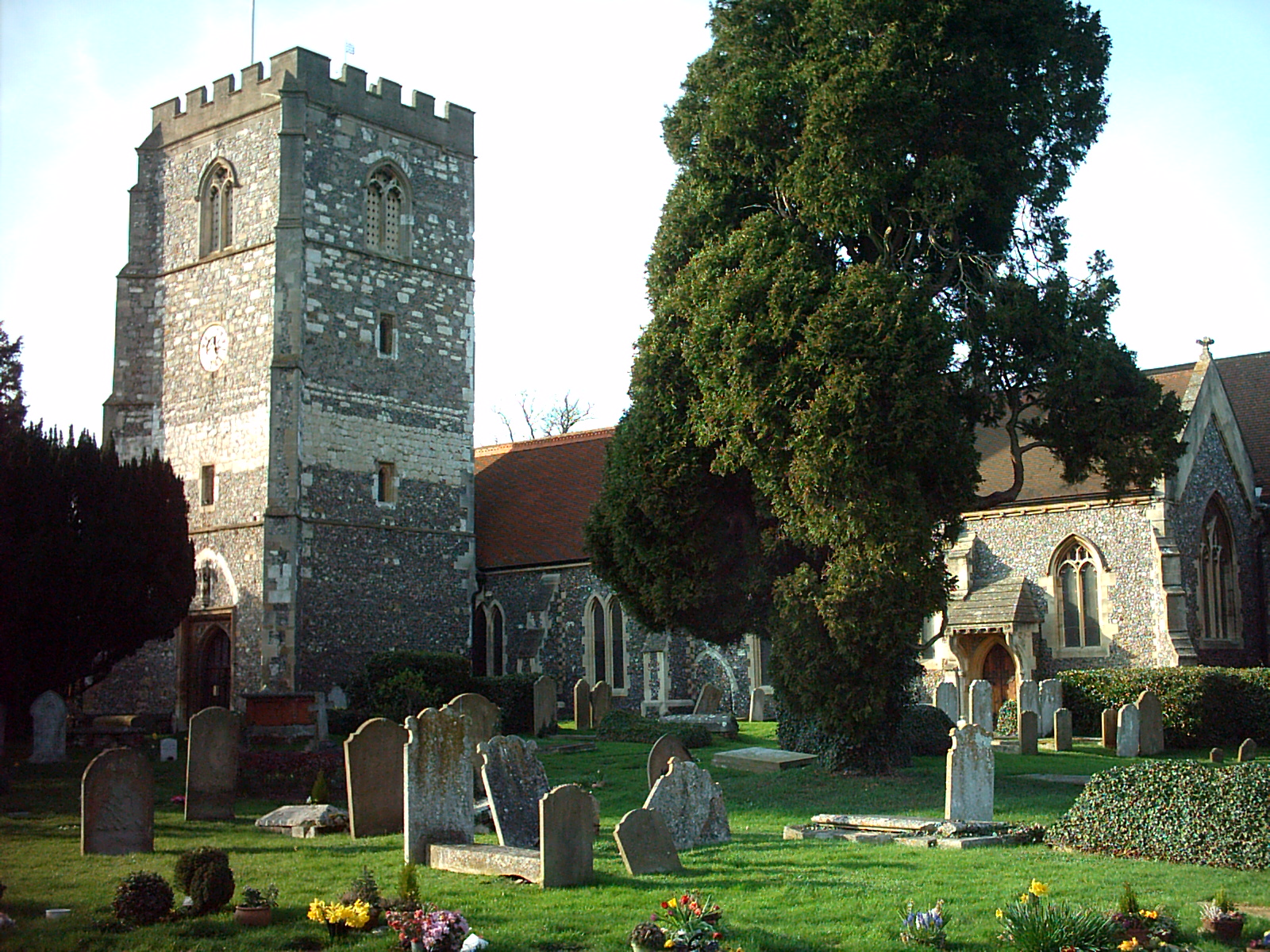
The Vicar's yew tree next to St Michael's Church, Bray

Orwell notes that the Vicar of Bray has a very poor reputation because of his political opportunism, but yet he left two positive legacies – an entertaining song and a giant yew tree which he is said to have planted in Bray church yard. Orwell then quotes two examples, one of murder and the other of adultery, where the perpetrators left something that could be appreciated after their deaths. Thibaw, last king of Burma, decapitated seventy or eighty of his brothers on his accession, but planted tamarind trees in Mandalay, and Mrs. Overall, wife of Dean Overall, was a wanton but was commemorated in an entertaining poem about her – "The Shepherd Swaine" by John Aubrey.

Orwell then makes a plea in favour of tree-planting. Ten years previously, he had bought a job-lot of fruit trees and rose bushes from a nursery, and he notes how they have flourished and will hopefully be appreciated in years to come. Therefore, planting a tree is a good way of atoning for misdeeds.

== Extract ==
Still, it might not be a bad idea, every time you commit an anti-social act, to make a note of it in your diary, and then, at the appropriate season, push an acorn into the ground. And even if one in twenty of them came to maturity, you might do quite a lot of harm in your lifetime, and still like the Vicar of Bray, end up as a public benefactor after all.

== Legacy ==
In 2021, writer Rebecca Solnit paid a visit to the cottage in Wallington, hoping to see Orwell's fruit trees. Alas, the trees had been cut down in the 1990s, but the roses he planted were still alive and well.

== See also ==
- Bibliography of George Orwell
