= La Braye (Chablais Alps) =

Mountain in Switzerland

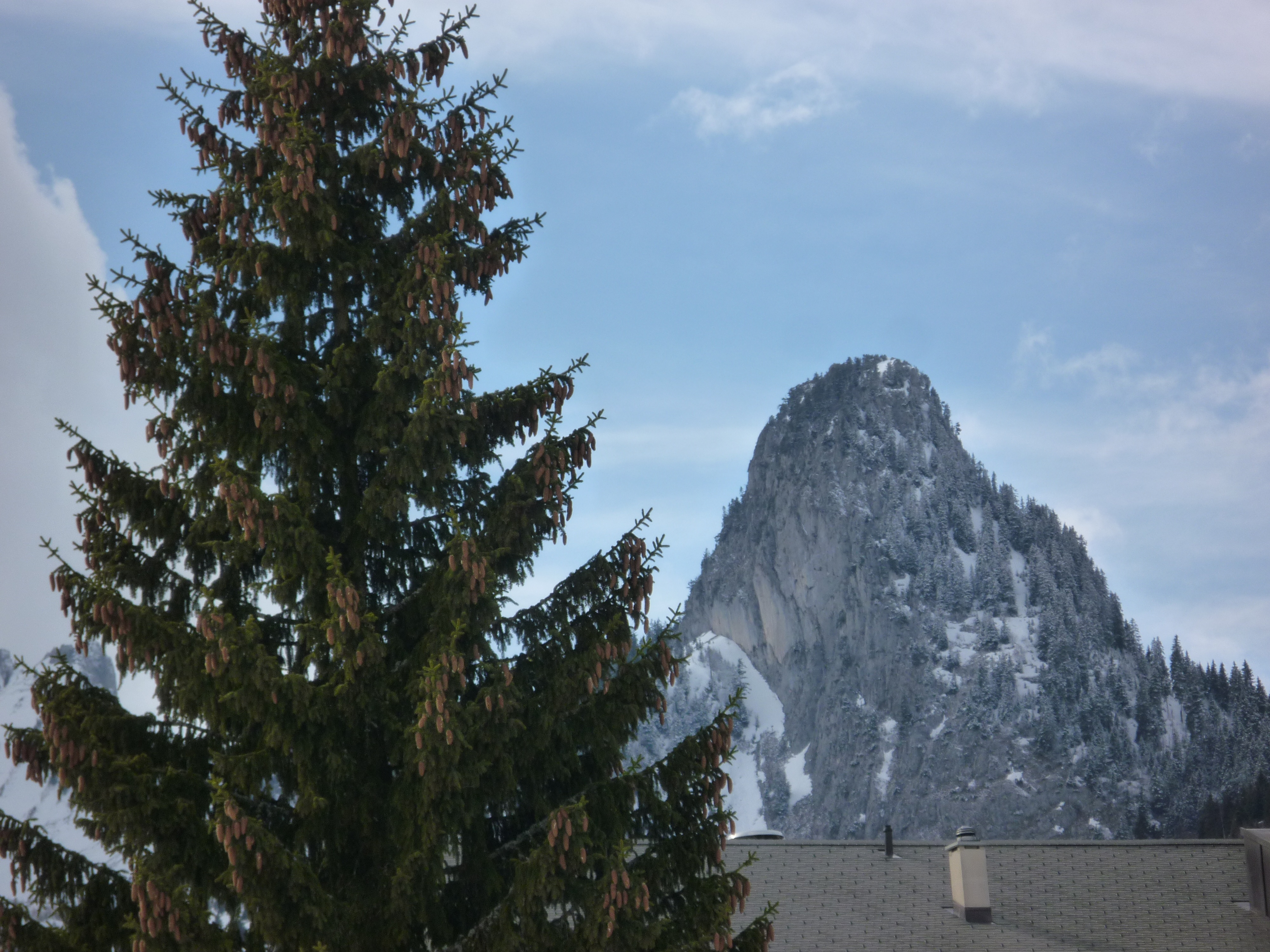
- View from Torgon

Highest point
- Elevation: 1,788 m (5,866 ft)
- Prominence: 155 m (509 ft)
- Coordinates: 46°19′08″N 06°50′24″E

Geography
- Location within Switzerland
- Location: Valais, Switzerland
- Parent range: Chablais Alps

La Braye (1,788 m) is a mountain of the Chablais Alps, located west of Torgon in the canton of Valais. It is the easternmost summit on the chain descending from Le Linleu.
