= 2019 Tour de Romandie =

2019 UCI World Tour, race 21 of 38

Race details
- Dates: 30 April–5 May 2019
- Stages: 6
- Distance: 631.12 km (392.16 mi)
- Winning time: 15h 25' 11"

Results
Jersey awarded to the overall winner	Winner	Primož Roglič (SLO)	(Team Jumbo–Visma)
	Second	Rui Costa (POR)	(UAE Team Emirates)
	Third	Geraint Thomas (GBR)	(Team INEOS)
Jersey awarded to the points classification winner	Points	Primož Roglič (SLO)	(Team Jumbo–Visma)
Jersey awarded to the mountains classification winner	Mountains	Simon Pellaud (SUI)	(Switzerland)
Jersey awarded to the youth classification winner	Youth	David Gaudu (FRA)	(Groupama–FDJ)
Jersey awarded to the team classification winner	Team	(United States) EF Education First	

The 2019 Tour de Romandie was a road cycling stage race that took place between 30 April and 5 May in the Romandy region of Switzerland. It was the 73rd edition of the Tour de Romandie and the 21st race of the 2019 UCI World Tour.

== Teams ==
In total, twenty teams started the race. Each team delivered seven riders.

UCI WorldTeams

- AG2R La Mondiale
- Astana
- Bahrain–Merida
- Bora–Hansgrohe
- CCC Team
- Deceuninck–Quick-Step
- EF Education First
- Groupama–FDJ
- Lotto–Soudal
- Mitchelton–Scott
- Movistar Team
- Team Dimension Data
- Team INEOS
- Team Jumbo–Visma
- Team Katusha–Alpecin
- Team Sunweb
- Trek–Segafredo
- UAE Team Emirates

UCI Professional Continental teams

- Wanty–Gobert

National teams

- Switzerland

== Route ==
Stage characteristics and winners
Stage	Date	Route	Distance	Type	Winner
P	30 April	Neuchâtel	3.87 km (2.4 mi)	Prologue	Jan Tratnik (SLO)
1	1 May	Neuchâtel to La Chaux-de-Fonds	168.4 km (104.6 mi)	Hilly stage	Primož Roglič (SLO)
2	2 May	Le Locle to Morges	174.4 km (108.4 mi)	Hilly stage	Stefan Küng (SUI)
3	3 May	Romont to Romont	160 km (99.4 mi)	Mountain stage	David Gaudu (FRA)
4	4 May	Lucens to Torgon	107.6 km (66.9 mi)	Mountain stage	Primož Roglič (SLO)
5	5 May	Genève to Genève	16.85 km (10.5 mi)	Individual time trial	Primož Roglič (SLO)

== Stages ==
=== Prologue ===
30 April 2019 — Neuchâtel, 3.87 kilometres (2.40 mi), individual time trial (ITT)

Prologue result
Rank	Rider	Team	Time
1	Jan Tratnik (SLO)	Bahrain–Merida	5' 06"
2	Primož Roglič (SLO)	Team Jumbo–Visma	+ 1"
3	Tom Bohli (SUI)	UAE Team Emirates	+ 1"
4	Tony Martin (GER)	Team Jumbo–Visma	+ 4"
5	Geraint Thomas (GBR)	Team INEOS	+ 4"
6	Alex Dowsett (GBR)	Team Katusha–Alpecin	+ 4"
7	Stefan Küng (SUI)	Groupama–FDJ	+ 5"
8	Carlos Betancur (COL)	Movistar Team	+ 5"
9	Maciej Bodnar (POL)	Bora–Hansgrohe	+ 5"
10	Rui Costa (POR)	UAE Team Emirates	+ 5"

General classification after prologue
Rank	Rider	Team	Time
1	Jan Tratnik (SLO)	Bahrain–Merida	5' 06"
2	Primož Roglič (SLO)	Team Jumbo–Visma	+ 1"
3	Tom Bohli (SUI)	UAE Team Emirates	+ 1"
4	Tony Martin (GER)	Team Jumbo–Visma	+ 4"
5	Geraint Thomas (GBR)	Team INEOS	+ 4"
6	Alex Dowsett (GBR)	Team Katusha–Alpecin	+ 4"
7	Stefan Küng (SUI)	Groupama–FDJ	+ 5"
8	Carlos Betancur (COL)	Movistar Team	+ 5"
9	Maciej Bodnar (POL)	Bora–Hansgrohe	+ 5"
10	Rui Costa (POR)	UAE Team Emirates	+ 5"

=== Stage 1 ===
1 May 2019 — Neuchâtel to La Chaux-de-Fonds, 168.4 kilometres (104.6 mi)

Stage 1 result
Rank	Rider	Team	Time
1	Primož Roglič (SLO)	Team Jumbo–Visma	4h 15' 18"
2	David Gaudu (FRA)	Groupama–FDJ	+ 0"
3	Rui Costa (POR)	UAE Team Emirates	+ 0"
4	Michael Woods (CAN)	EF Education First	+ 0"
5	Damien Howson (AUS)	Mitchelton–Scott	+ 0"
6	Carl Fredrik Hagen (NOR)	Lotto–Soudal	+ 0"
7	Eduardo Sepúlveda (ARG)	Movistar Team	+ 0"
8	Jan Hirt (CZE)	Astana	+ 0"
9	Felix Großschartner (AUT)	Bora–Hansgrohe	+ 0"
10	Guillaume Martin (FRA)	Wanty–Gobert	+ 0"

General classification after stage 1
Rank	Rider	Team	Time
1	Primož Roglič (SLO)	Team Jumbo–Visma	4h 20' 15"
2	Rui Costa (POR)	UAE Team Emirates	+ 10"
3	David Gaudu (FRA)	Groupama–FDJ	+ 12"
4	Geraint Thomas (GBR)	Team INEOS	+ 13"
5	Carlos Betancur (COL)	Movistar Team	+ 14"
6	Felix Großschartner (AUT)	Bora–Hansgrohe	+ 15"
7	Steven Kruijswijk (NED)	Team Jumbo–Visma	+ 17"
8	James Knox (GBR)	Deceuninck–Quick-Step	+ 18"
9	Damien Howson (AUS)	Mitchelton–Scott	+ 18"
10	Winner Anacona (COL)	Movistar Team	+ 19"

=== Stage 2 ===
2 May 2019 — Le Locle to Morges, 174.4 kilometres (108.4 mi)

Stage 2 result
Rank	Rider	Team	Time
1	Stefan Küng (SUI)	Groupama–FDJ	4h 10' 59"
2	Sam Bennett (IRL)	Bora–Hansgrohe	+ 59"
3	Sonny Colbrelli (ITA)	Bahrain–Merida	+ 59"
4	Simone Consonni (ITA)	UAE Team Emirates	+ 59"
5	Elia Viviani (ITA)	Deceuninck–Quick-Step	+ 59"
6	Patrick Bevin (NZL)	CCC Team	+ 59"
7	Michael Albasini (SUI)	Mitchelton–Scott	+ 59"
8	Vyacheslav Kuznetsov (RUS)	Team Katusha–Alpecin	+ 59"
9	Giacomo Nizzolo (ITA)	Team Dimension Data	+ 59"
10	Andrea Pasqualon (ITA)	Wanty–Gobert	+ 59"

General classification after stage 2
Rank	Rider	Team	Time
1	Primož Roglič (SLO)	Team Jumbo–Visma	8h 32' 13"
2	Rui Costa (POR)	UAE Team Emirates	+ 10"
3	David Gaudu (FRA)	Groupama–FDJ	+ 12"
4	Geraint Thomas (GBR)	Team INEOS	+ 13"
5	Carlos Betancur (COL)	Movistar Team	+ 14"
6	Felix Großschartner (AUT)	Bora–Hansgrohe	+ 15"
7	Steven Kruijswijk (NED)	Team Jumbo–Visma	+ 17"
8	James Knox (GBR)	Deceuninck–Quick-Step	+ 18"
9	Damien Howson (AUS)	Mitchelton–Scott	+ 18"
10	Winner Anacona (COL)	Movistar Team	+ 19"

=== Stage 3 ===
3 May 2019 — Romont to Romont, 160 kilometres (99 mi)

Stage 3 result
Rank	Rider	Team	Time
1	David Gaudu (FRA)	Groupama–FDJ	3h 50' 53"
2	Rui Costa (POR)	UAE Team Emirates	+ 0"
3	Primož Roglič (SLO)	Team Jumbo–Visma	+ 0"
4	Michael Woods (CAN)	EF Education First	+ 0"
5	Felix Großschartner (AUT)	Bora–Hansgrohe	+ 0"
6	Guillaume Martin (FRA)	Wanty–Gobert	+ 3"
7	Emanuel Buchmann (GER)	Bora–Hansgrohe	+ 3"
8	Davide Villella (ITA)	Astana	+ 3"
9	Carl Fredrik Hagen (NOR)	Lotto–Soudal	+ 3"
10	Damien Howson (AUS)	Mitchelton–Scott	+ 3"

General classification after stage 3
Rank	Rider	Team	Time
1	Primož Roglič (SLO)	Team Jumbo–Visma	12h 23' 02"
2	David Gaudu (FRA)	Groupama–FDJ	+ 6"
3	Rui Costa (POR)	UAE Team Emirates	+ 8"
4	Felix Großschartner (AUT)	Bora–Hansgrohe	+ 19"
5	Geraint Thomas (GBR)	Team INEOS	+ 20"
6	Carlos Betancur (COL)	Movistar Team	+ 21"
7	Damien Howson (AUS)	Mitchelton–Scott	+ 25"
8	Steven Kruijswijk (NED)	Team Jumbo–Visma	+ 27"
8	Michael Woods (CAN)	EF Education First	+ 28"
10	Emanuel Buchmann (GER)	Bora–Hansgrohe	+ 29"

=== Stage 4 ===
4 May 2019 — Lucens to Torgon, 107.6 kilometres (66.9 mi)

Stage 4 result
Rank	Rider	Team	Time
1	Primož Roglič (SLO)	Team Jumbo–Visma	2h 42' 21"
2	Rui Costa (POR)	UAE Team Emirates	+ 0"
3	Geraint Thomas (GBR)	Team INEOS	+ 0"
4	Michael Woods (CAN)	EF Education First	+ 0"
5	David Gaudu (FRA)	Groupama–FDJ	+ 0"
6	Felix Großschartner (AUT)	Bora–Hansgrohe	+ 0"
7	Jan Hirt (CZE)	Astana	+ 0"
8	Emanuel Buchmann (GER)	Bora–Hansgrohe	+ 0"
9	Steven Kruijswijk (NED)	Team Jumbo–Visma	+ 0"
10	Ilnur Zakarin (RUS)	Team Katusha–Alpecin	+ 0"

General classification after stage 4
Rank	Rider	Team	Time
1	Primož Roglič (SLO)	Team Jumbo–Visma	15h 05' 13"
2	Rui Costa (POR)	UAE Team Emirates	+ 12"
3	David Gaudu (FRA)	Groupama–FDJ	+ 16"
4	Geraint Thomas (GBR)	Team INEOS	+ 26"
5	Felix Großschartner (AUT)	Bora–Hansgrohe	+ 29"
6	Steven Kruijswijk (NED)	Team Jumbo–Visma	+ 37"
7	Michael Woods (CAN)	EF Education First	+ 38"
8	Emanuel Buchmann (GER)	Bora–Hansgrohe	+ 39"
9	Carlos Betancur (COL)	Movistar Team	+ 57"
10	Simon Špilak (SLO)	Team Katusha–Alpecin	+ 1' 00"

=== Stage 5 ===
5 May 2019 — Geneva to Geneva, 16.85 kilometres (10.47 mi), individual time trial (ITT)

Stage 5 result
Rank	Rider	Team	Time
1	Primož Roglič (SLO)	Team Jumbo–Visma	19' 58"
2	Victor Campenaerts (BEL)	Lotto–Soudal	+ 13"
3	Filippo Ganna (ITA)	Team INEOS	+ 15"
4	Patrick Bevin (NZL)	CCC Team	+ 16"
5	Tony Martin (GER)	Team Jumbo–Visma	+ 16"
6	Stefan Küng (SUI)	Groupama–FDJ	+ 22"
7	Rui Costa (POR)	UAE Team Emirates	+ 37"
8	Will Barta (USA)	CCC Team	+ 43"
9	Felix Großschartner (AUT)	Bora–Hansgrohe	+ 44"
10	Geraint Thomas (GBR)	Team INEOS	+ 46"

General classification after stage 5
Rank	Rider	Team	Time
1	Primož Roglič (SLO)	Team Jumbo–Visma	15h 25' 11"
2	Rui Costa (POR)	UAE Team Emirates	+ 49"
3	Geraint Thomas (GBR)	Team INEOS	+ 1' 12"
4	Felix Großschartner (AUT)	Bora–Hansgrohe	+ 1' 13"
5	David Gaudu (FRA)	Groupama–FDJ	+ 1' 17"
6	Steven Kruijswijk (NED)	Team Jumbo–Visma	+ 1' 33"
7	Emanuel Buchmann (GER)	Bora–Hansgrohe	+ 1' 35"
8	Ilnur Zakarin (RUS)	Team Katusha–Alpecin	+ 2' 00"
9	Simon Špilak (SLO)	Team Katusha–Alpecin	+ 2' 08"
10	Michael Woods (CAN)	EF Education First	+ 2' 18"

== Classification leadership table ==
Stage	Winner	General classification	Points classification	Mountains classification	Young rider classification	Team classification
P	Jan Tratnik	Jan Tratnik	Jan Tratnik	not awarded	Benjamin Thomas	Team Jumbo–Visma
1	Primož Roglič	Primož Roglič	Primož Roglič	Simon Pellaud	David Gaudu	Movistar Team
2	Stefan Küng	Primož Roglič	Stefan Küng	Simon Pellaud	David Gaudu	Movistar Team
3	David Gaudu	Primož Roglič	Primož Roglič	Simon Pellaud	David Gaudu	Movistar Team
4	Primož Roglič	Primož Roglič	Primož Roglič	Simon Pellaud	David Gaudu	EF Education First
5	Primož Roglič	Primož Roglič	Primož Roglič	Simon Pellaud	David Gaudu	EF Education First
Final		Primož Roglič	Primož Roglič	Simon Pellaud	David Gaudu	EF Education First

== Final classification standings ==
Legend
Denotes the leader of the general classification
Denotes the leader of the points classification
Denotes the leader of the mountains classification
Denotes the leader of the young rider classification
Denotes the leader of the team classification

=== General classification ===
Final general classification (1–10)
Rank	Rider	Team	Time
1	Primož Roglič (SLO)	Team Jumbo–Visma	15h 25' 11"
2	Rui Costa (POR)	UAE Team Emirates	+ 49"
3	Geraint Thomas (GBR)	Team INEOS	+ 1' 12"
4	Felix Großschartner (AUT)	Bora–Hansgrohe	+ 1' 13"
5	David Gaudu (FRA)	Groupama–FDJ	+ 1' 17"
6	Steven Kruijswijk (NED)	Team Jumbo–Visma	+ 1' 33"
7	Emanuel Buchmann (GER)	Bora–Hansgrohe	+ 1' 35"
8	Ilnur Zakarin (RUS)	Team Katusha–Alpecin	+ 2' 00"
9	Simon Špilak (SLO)	Team Katusha–Alpecin	+ 2' 08"
10	Michael Woods (CAN)	EF Education First	+ 2' 18"

=== Points classification ===
Final points classification (1–10)
Rank	Rider	Team	Points
1	Primož Roglič (SLO)	Team Jumbo–Visma	155
2	Rui Costa (POR)	UAE Team Emirates	105
3	Stefan Küng (SUI)	Groupama–FDJ	103
4	David Gaudu (FRA)	Groupama–FDJ	97
5	Michael Woods (CAN)	EF Education First	55
6	Felix Großschartner (AUT)	Bora–Hansgrohe	52
7	Claudio Imhof (SUI)	Switzerland	50
8	Geraint Thomas (GBR)	Team INEOS	49
9	Emanuel Buchmann (GER)	Bora–Hansgrohe	44
10	Patrick Bevin (NZL)	CCC Team	39

=== Mountains classification ===
Final mountains classification (1–10)
Rank	Rider	Team	Points
1	Simon Pellaud (SUI)	Switzerland	51
2	Steven Kruijswijk (NED)	Team Jumbo–Visma	24
3	Diego Rosa (ITA)	Team INEOS	22
4	David Gaudu (FRA)	Groupama–FDJ	16
5	Patrick Schelling (SUI)	Switzerland	16
6	Geraint Thomas (GBR)	Team INEOS	14
7	Primož Roglič (SLO)	Team Jumbo–Visma	12
8	Stefan Küng (SUI)	Groupama–FDJ	11
9	Alexis Gougeard (FRA)	AG2R La Mondiale	11
10	Hugh Carthy (GBR)	EF Education First	10

=== Young rider classification ===
Final young rider classification (1–10)
Rank	Rider	Team	Time
1	David Gaudu (FRA)	Groupama–FDJ	15h 26' 28"
2	James Knox (GBR)	Deceuninck–Quick-Step	+ 1' 17"
3	Daniel Martínez (COL)	EF Education First	+ 4' 07"
4	Niklas Eg (DEN)	Trek–Segafredo	+ 6' 08"
5	Jaime Castrillo (ESP)	Movistar Team	+ 13' 36"
6	Jonas Gregaard (DEN)	Astana	+ 15' 31"
7	Michael Storer (AUS)	Team Sunweb	+ 17' 50"
8	Florian Stork (GER)	Team Sunweb	+ 26' 00"
9	Benjamin Thomas (FRA)	Groupama–FDJ	+ 27' 02"
10	Jonas Vingegaard (DEN)	Team Jumbo–Visma	+ 27' 39"

=== Team classification ===
Final team classification (1–10)
Rank	Team	Time
1	(United States) EF Education First	46h 23' 17"
2	(Spain) Movistar Team	+ 43"
3	(Poland) CCC Team	+ 4' 38"
4	(France) Groupama–FDJ	+ 6' 14"
5	(Netherlands) Team Jumbo–Visma	+ 6' 52"
6	(Kazakhstan) Astana	+ 8' 13"
7	(France) AG2R La Mondiale	+ 8' 57"
8	(United States) Trek–Segafredo	+ 10' 12"
9	(United Kingdom) Team INEOS	+ 11' 54"
10	(United Arab Emirates) UAE Team Emirates	+ 12' 45"
