= Braye =

Braye may refer to:

== Places ==
- Braye (river), a river in France
- Braye du Valle, Guernsey, the area between Guernsey and Le Clos du Valle in the Channel Islands
- Braye Harbour, the main port of Alderney, in the Channel Islands
- La Braye (Chablais Alps), a mountain in Valais, Switzerland

=== Communes in France ===
- Braye, Aisne, in the Aisne département
- Braye-en-Laonnois, in the Aisne département
- Braye-en-Thiérache, in the Aisne département
- Braye-sous-Faye, in the Indre-et-Loire département
- Braye-sur-Maulne, in the Indre-et-Loire département

== People with the surname ==
- Braye (surname)

== Other uses ==
- Baron Braye, a title in the Peerage of England, of Eaton Bray in the County of Bedford

== See also ==
- Bray (disambiguation)
