= Torgon =

Coordinates: 46°19′13″N 6°52′35″E

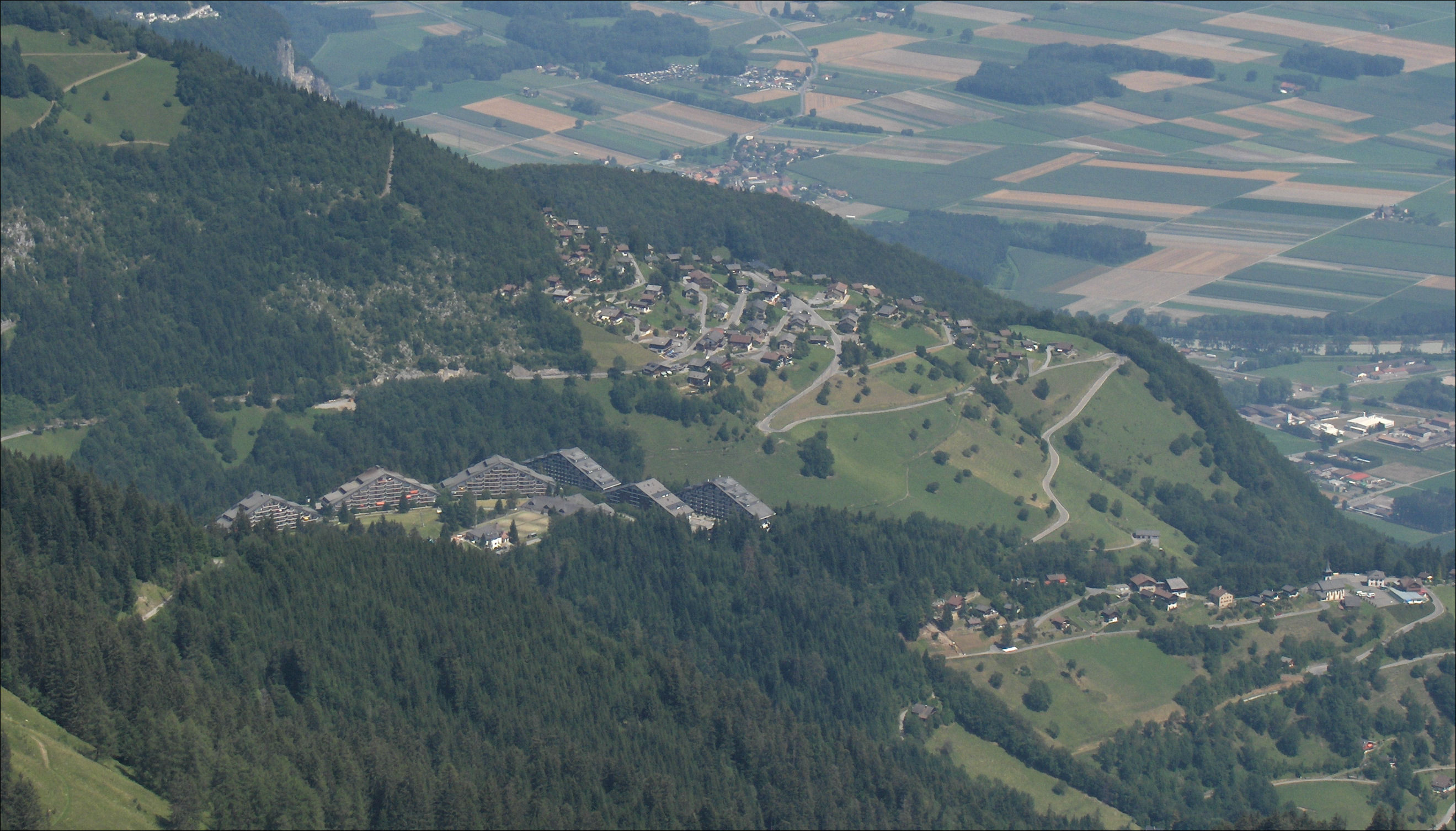
View of Torgon from Tour de Don summit

Torgon is a village in the Swiss Alps, located in the canton of Valais. It lies on the western part of the canton, in the region of the Chablais, at an altitude of 1,085 metres. The village sits on a sunny terrace overlooking the Rhone valley, above Vionnaz. Politically Torgon belongs to the latter town.

Torgon is a winter sports resort and is part of the ski area Portes du Soleil. Mountains around Torgon are Le Linleu (2,093 m), the Haut Sex (1,961 m) and the Tour de Don (1,998 m).

As of the 2016/17 season, the two main ski lifts into Torgon village proper have shut permanently due to safety and monetary issues. Skiing is now almost entirely limited to the Plan-du-croix sector of Torgon which have access to the Portes su Soleil area.
