= John Oxenbridge =

English clergyman (1608–1674)

John Oxenbridge (30 January 1608 – 28 December 1674) was an English Nonconformist divine, who emigrated to New England.

== Life ==
Coat of Arms of John Oxenbridge

He was born at Daventry, Northamptonshire, and was educated at Emmanuel College, Cambridge, and Magdalen Hall, Oxford (B.A. 1628, M.A. 1631). As tutor of Magdalen Hall he drew up a new code of articles referring to the government of the college. He was, as a consequence, deprived of his office in May 1634, by William Laud. After leaving the Hall, Oxenbridge married his first wife, Jane Butler.

He began to preach, with a similar disregard for constituted authority. His wife being a scholar in the profound points of theology, he commonly got her opinion upon a text before he preached it. After voyages to the Bermudas he returned to England (1641), and after exercising an itinerant and unattached ministry settled for some months in Great Yarmouth and then at Beverley. During the Civil War he was lecturer at St. Mary's, York, and helped negotiate the surrender of Scarborough Castle. He was minister at Berwick-on-Tweed when in October 1652 he was appointed a fellow of Eton College.

In 1653 he was made a commissioner with responsibility for the Bermudas. At Eton in 1658 he preached the funeral sermon of Francis Rous, the provost. In 1658, his first wife died. Andrew Marvell, who was their friend, wrote an epitaph Janae Oxenbrigiae Epitaphium for her tomb at Eton. It was defaced at the Restoration. Less than a year after his first wife's death, Oxenbridge married Frances Woodward, daughter of Hezekiah Woodward, ejected vicar of Bray. Frances died in childbed in the first year of their marriage.

In 1660 Oxenbridge was ejected from Eton. He returned to his preaching at Berwick-on-Tweed, but was expelled by the Act of Uniformity in 1662. He then spent some time in Surinam and Barbados. He married his third wife, Susanna, after November 1666, and probably at Barbados, where he had met her.

In 1670, he settled at Boston, Massachusetts. He and his wife were admitted members of the First Church in Boston, and shortly afterwards he was unanimously invited to become its pastor, succeeding John Davenport. Oxenbridge died in 1674 near the end of one of his sermons, and was buried in King's Chapel Burying Ground in Boston.

== Works ==
A Double Watch-Word or, The Duty of Watching, and Watching to Duty (1661). A Quickening Word (1670). New England Freemen Warned and Warmed (1673).

== Family ==
His sister Elizabeth married Oliver St John, as his second wife. His daughter Theodora married Peter Thacher (1651-1727).
