= Vicar of Bray (scientific hypothesis) =

Fisherian explanation of the evolution of sexual reproduction and recombination

This diagram illustrates how sexual reproduction (top) might create new genotypes faster than asexual reproduction (bottom). The advantageous alleles A and B occur randomly. In sexual reproduction, the two alleles are combined rapidly. But in asexual reproduction, the two alleles must independently arise through clonal interference.

The "Vicar of Bray" hypothesis (or Fisher-Muller Model) attempts to explain why sexual reproduction might have advantages over asexual reproduction. Reproduction is the process by which organisms give rise to offspring. Asexual reproduction involves a single parent and results in offspring that are genetically identical to each other and to the parent.

In contrast to asexual reproduction, sexual reproduction involves two parents. Both the parents produce gametes through meiosis, a special type of cell division that reduces the chromosome number by half. During an early stage of meiosis, before the chromosomes are separated in the two daughter cells, the chromosomes undergo genetic recombination. This allows them to exchange some of their genetic information. Therefore, the gametes from a single organism are all genetically different from each other. The process in which the two gametes from the two parents unite is called fertilization. Half of the genetic information from both parents is combined. This results in offspring that are genetically different from each other and from the parents.

In short, sexual reproduction allows a continuous rearrangement of genes. Therefore, the offspring of a population of sexually reproducing individuals will show a more varied selection of phenotypes. Due to faster attainment of favorable genetic combinations, sexually reproducing populations evolve more rapidly in response to environmental changes. Under the Vicar of Bray hypothesis, sex benefits a population as a whole, but not individuals within it, making it a case of group selection.

== Origin of the name 'Vicar of Bray' ==
The hypothesis is called after the Vicar of Bray, a semi-fictionalized cleric who retained his ecclesiastic office by quickly adapting to the prevailing religious winds in England, switching between various Protestant and Catholic rites as the ruling hierarchy changed. The figure described was Simon Aleyn between 1540 and 1588. The main work of Thomas Fuller (d. 1661), Worthies of England, describes this man:

The vivacious vicar [of Bray] living under King Henry VIII, King Edward VI, Queen Mary, and Queen Elizabeth, was first a Papist, then a Protestant, then a Papist, then a Protestant again. He had seen some martyrs burnt (two miles off) at Windsor and found this fire too hot for his tender temper. This vicar, being taxed [attacked] by one for being a turncoat and an inconstant changeling, said, "Not so, for I always kept my principle, which is this – to live and die the Vicar of Bray." – Worthies of England, published 1662

== Origin of the hypothesis ==
The hypothesis was first expressed in 1889 by August Weismann and later by Guenther (1906). Afterwards, the hypothesis was formulated in terms of population genetics by Fisher (1930) and Muller (1932) and with greater mathematical formalism, by Muller (1958, 1964) and Crow and Kimura (1965). The doubts about the validity of the Vicar of Bray hypothesis caused the upcoming of alternative hypotheses such as:

- Best-Man (Williams, 1966; Emlen, 1973; Treisman, 1976): The Best-Man hypothesis proposes that, on average, sexually produced offspring may be of somewhat lower fitness than the asexually produced offspring, but the much greater diversity of the sexually produced offspring implies that they will include a few individuals of extraordinary high fitness. If these individuals have a high chance on survival and reproducing, their offspring might also be of high fitness. If you consider this going on for multiple generations, the proportion of individuals with a high fitness might increase so rapidly that it will be more than sufficient to offset the cost of sex.
- Tangled Bank (Ghiselin, 1974; Burt and Bell, 1987; Ridley, 1993): The Tangled Bank hypothesis proposes that sexual reproduction is beneficial when there exists intense competition for space, food and resources. It argues that genetically diverse offspring from sexually reproducing individuals are able to extract more food from their environment than genetically identical offspring from asexually reproducing individuals.
- Red Queen (Van Valen, 1973; Hamilton, 1975; Levin, 1975; Charlesworth, 1976; Glesener and Tilman, 1978; Glesener, 1979; Bell, 1982; Bell and Maynard Smith, 1987; Ridley, 1993; Peters and Lively, 1999, 2007; Otto and Nuismer, 2004; Kouyos et al., 2007; Salathé et al., 2008): The Red Queen hypothesis proposes that organisms must constantly adapt and evolve in order to survive. If a species does not adapt to its evolving natural enemies and the changing environment, it will go extinct. This hypothesis also proposes that sexual reproduction is beneficial. But in contrast to the Vicar of Bray hypothesis, the Red Queen hypothesis states that sexual reproduction does not only benefit the population as a whole, but it benefits individual genes directly.

Mathematical models have been used in order to try to prove or disprove these hypotheses. However, for a mathematical model, assumptions must be made. Assumptions on the size of the population, the breeding process, the environment, natural enemies and so on. That is why there will always be populations for which the model does not apply. Some models are better in explaining the ‘average’ population, while others better explain the smaller populations or populations that live in a more extreme environment. A good way to decide which model is the best might be to compare the expected result from the model with data from natural observations.

People who criticize the Vicar of Bray hypothesis (and all other hypotheses that propose sexual reproduction has an advantage over asexual reproduction) say that sexual reproduction might be beneficial in some situations, but not always, which is why both ways of reproduction still exist. If either sexual reproduction or asexual reproduction would be much more beneficial, evolution should result in one of the two ways of reproduction to disappear and the other one to persist.
