= Haut Sex =

Mountain in Switzerland

- Pointe de Recon
- Location within Alps

Highest point
- Elevation: 1,961 m (6,434 ft)
- Prominence: 155 m (509 ft)
- Parent peak: Tour de Don
- Coordinates: 46°17′59.3″N 6°50′5″E

Geography
- Location: Valais, Switzerland; Haute-Savoie, France
- Parent range: Chablais Alps

The Haut Sex (also known as Pointe de Recon) (1,961 m) is a mountain of the Chablais Alps, located on the border between Switzerland and France. It lies north of the Tour de Don.
