= Hezekiah Woodward =

Hezekiah Woodward (1590–1675) was an English nonconformist minister and educator, who was involved in the pamphlet wars of the 1640s. He was a Comenian in educational theory, and an associate of Samuel Hartlib. He was one of those articulating the Puritan argument against the celebration of Christmas.

== Life ==
In the early 1640s he was a preacher at Aldermanbury in London. At this period he was linked with John Milton, as authors in "the frequent printing of scandalous Books by divers". He was officially examined about his writings at the end of December 1644, being released after two days, and having acknowledged authorship of some work or works, thought to have included the anonymous As You Were. Milton either was not pulled in, or was quickly allowed to go.

Then, at St Michael's Church, Bray, he was an Independent minister, but was ejected in 1662, after the English Restoration of 1660. Subsequently he was in Uxbridge, one of the founders of the Old Meeting Congregational Church there.

== Writings ==
He engaged Thomas Edwards, a major writer on the Presbyterian side. Woodward supported Katherine Chidley against Edwards.

As You Were: or a reducing (1644) was published anonymously, and in support of John Goodwin. It was a reply to Faces About, attributed to George Gillespie. Gillespie hit back in Wholesome Severity, from the Presbyterian side.

On education, he advanced the argument that the current grammar schools lacked provision for the most elementary schooling, to the detriment of the quality of the latter. His A Light to Grammar (1641) makes the case for education based on stimulation; A Gate to Science favoured realism and intelligibility in textbooks.

Parents, in his view, delegated too much of a child's upbringing to teachers. He wrote about his own schooling, in A Childes Patrimony (1640), and Portion (1649).

== Family ==
His daughter Frances married John Oxenbridge. His daughter Sarah married Daniel Henchman (c.1627-1685), a founder of Worcester, Massachusetts.
