= Lac d'Arvouin =

Lake in France

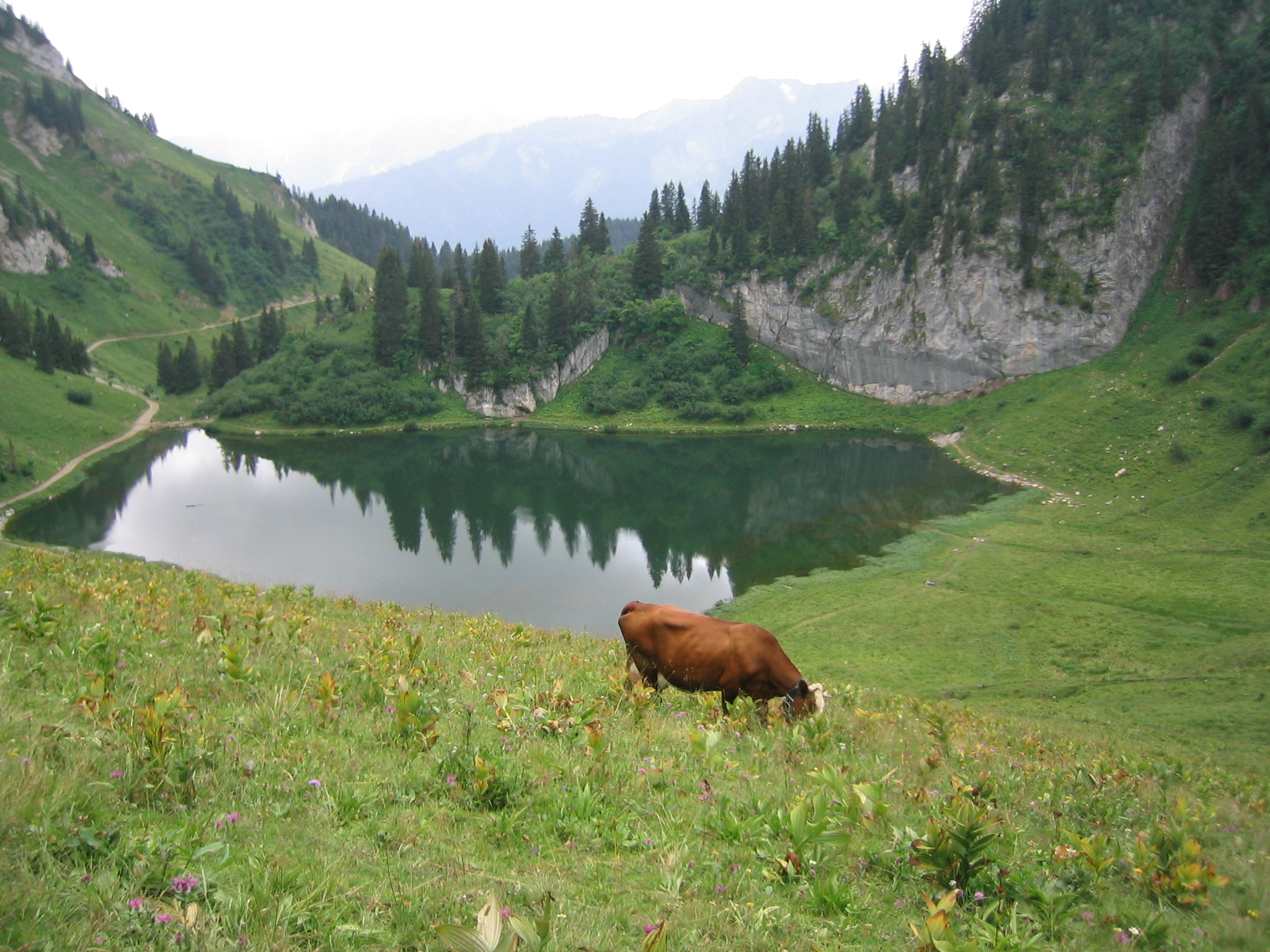

- Location within France
- Location: La Chapelle-d'Abondance, Haute-Savoie
- Coordinates: 46°18′51″N 6°48′35″E
- Basin countries: France
- Surface area: 1.6 ha (4.0 acres)
- Max. depth: 6.3 m (21 ft)
- Surface elevation: 1,663 m (5,456 ft)

Lac d'Arvouin is a lake south of Cornettes de Bise in the Haute-Savoie region of France. The lake is surrounded by several summits, including Pointe d'Arvouin (2,019 m) and Le Linleu (2,093 m). It covers an area of 1.8 hectares and its deepest point is 6.3 metres. It is located at an altitude of 1,663 metres.

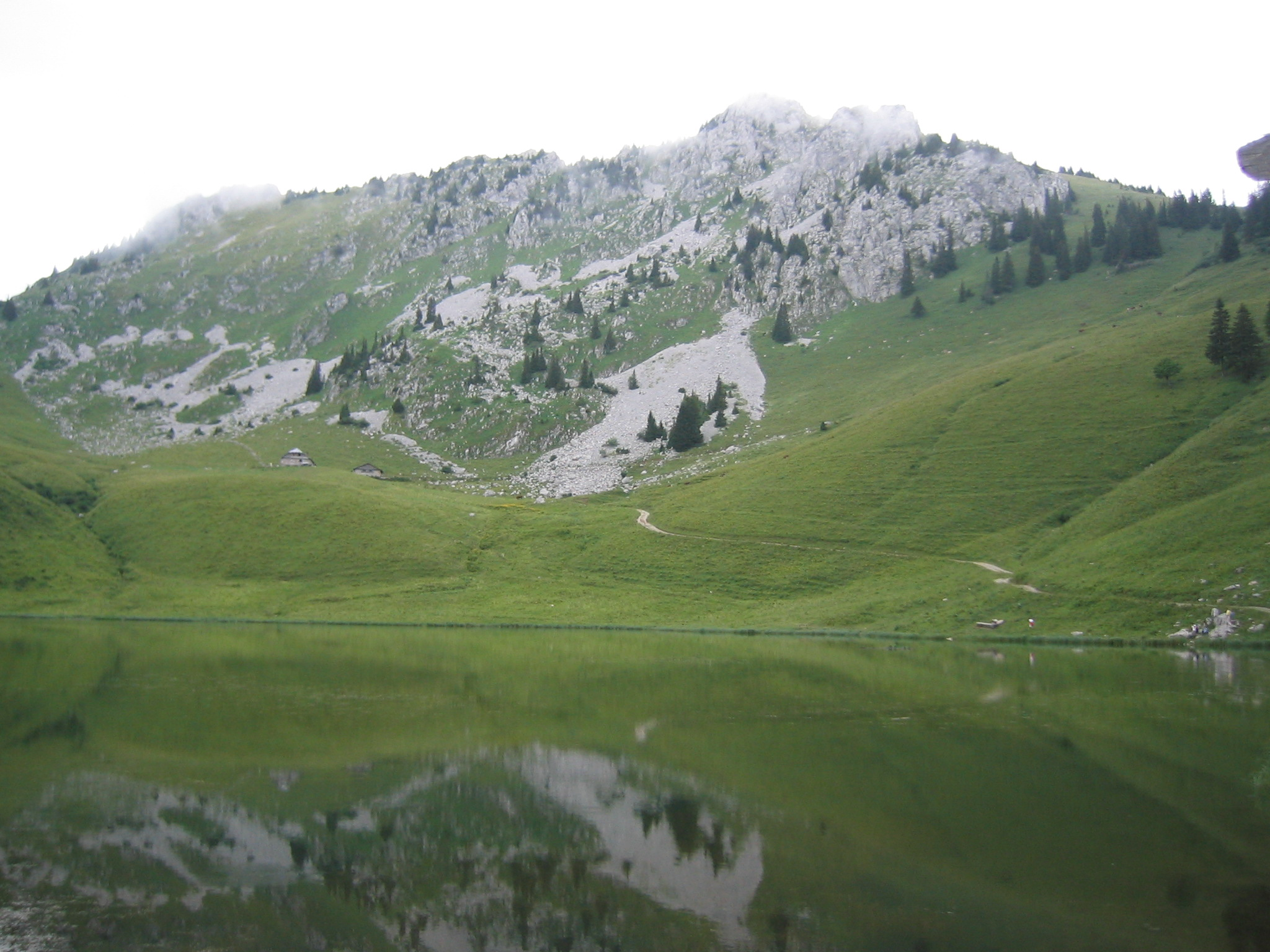
Pointe d'Arvouin and the lake
