= Vicar of Bray (term) =

Satirical term for church officials

The Vicar of Bray is a satirical description of an individual fundamentally changing his principles to remain in ecclesiastical office as external requirements change around him. The religious upheavals in England from 1533 to 1559 (and then from 1633 to 1715) made it impossible for any devout clergyman to comply with all the successive requirements of the established church. The original figure was the vicar Simon Aleyn, although clerics who faced vicissitudes resulted in revised versions of the story.

A satirical 18th-century song, "The Vicar of Bray", recounts the career of a vicar of Bray, Berkshire, towards the end of this period and his contortions of principle in order to retain his ecclesiastic office despite the changes through the course of several monarchs from Charles II to George I. A comic opera covers a later period in 18th-century history, while a film set in Bray, County Wicklow, in Ireland, covers Charles I, the English Civil War, the Commonwealth of England, The Protectorate, and restoration of Charles II.

The Vicar of Bray "personif(ies) the archetypically Anglican knack for tasteful ambiguity that precludes the vulgar dialectic of yes or no. "So, is it both/and or either/or, your Grace?" "Well, surely we must say it's both, mustn't we?" It's a talent developed to an art form in the Anglican tradition."

== Historical basis ==
The parish alluded to in most versions of the song is Bray, Berkshire, which at the time was almost wholly rural and agrarian. An early textual source for the legend of a long-standing, resilient and pliable incumbent of the parish of Bray was provided by Thomas Fuller (d. 1661) in his Worthies of England. Fuller's account of the story runs as follows:

The vivacious vicar [of Bray] living under King Henry VIII, King Edward VI, Queen Mary, and Queen Elizabeth, was first a Papist, then a Protestant, then a Papist, then a Protestant again. He had seen some martyrs burnt (two miles off) at Windsor and found this fire too hot for his tender temper.

This vicar, being taxed [attacked] by one for being a turncoat and an inconstant changeling, said, "Not so, for I always kept my principle, which is this – to live and die the Vicar of Bray."

— Worthies of England, published 1662

However, according to the facts of who held the benefice, the vicar alluded to by Fuller seems actually to have been two or more separate incumbents. Simon Symonds was vicar of Bray in 1522-51 during the reigns of Henry VIII and Edward VI. Simon Aleyn was vicar in 1557–1565 under Mary I and Elizabeth I.

It seems that Bray's Tudor clerics set a precedent, and the commonest version of the song today is based on events in the Stuart period. The incumbent during that period was Francis Carswell, vicar for 42 years, from 1667, who died in Bray in 1709. He was among very few clerics in England to minister to parishioners throughout such a long and fraught historical period, including the years after The Restoration and the Glorious Revolution.

Several other clerics inspired variants of the tradition and song, according to their location and date. They include:

- Andrew Perne (1519–89), sometime Dean of Ely whose initials were variously said to stand for "A Papist", "A Protestant" and "A Puritan", subject to the prevailing wind
- Thomas Barlow (1607–1691), Bishop of Lincoln
- Timothy Bray (1480–1539), Abbot of Heath, Derbyshire
- Edmund Waller (1606–1687), poet and politician.

== The song ==
In the song "The Vicar of Bray", the eponymous vicar was the clergyman of St Michael's Church, Bray. The most familiar version of the lyrics recount his adaptability (some would say amorality) over half a century, from the reigns of Charles II to George I. Over this period, he embraced whichever form of liturgy, Protestant or Catholic, was favoured by the monarch of the day in order to retain his position as vicar of Bray.

== Comic opera ==
The Vicar of Bray is an 1882 comic opera by Sydney Grundy and Edward Solomon. The opera is based on the character described in the 18th-century song, as well as on The History of Sandford and Merton, a series of 18th century moral tales.

== 1937 film version ==
A film version of the tale was released in 1937 starring Stanley Holloway as the vicar. In the film, the vicar (of Bray, County Wicklow, in Ireland) is given a more positive character and events are placed at a slightly earlier period, during the English Civil War. He successfully protects his parishioners by adopting a diplomatic approach during the turbulent events and secures forgiveness for moderate rebels from the restored Charles II.

== Cultural impact ==
The Tower of Bray is also referred to in the song Parlour Songs in the Stephen Sondheim musical Sweeney Todd, although the song has been removed from more recent performances of that musical.

George Orwell wrote an essay called A Good Word for the Vicar of Bray.

A scientific hypothesis is named after the Vicar of Bray that attempts to explain why sexual reproduction might be favoured over asexual reproduction.

Vicar of Bray is the name of the last-known surviving Whitehaven wooden-built ship. It was launched on 22 April 1841 by Robert Hardy.
