= George Hamilton (canon) =

Hon. George Hamilton MA (11 August 1718 – 26 November 1787) was a Canon of Windsor from 1783 to 1787.

== Family ==
He was the third surviving son on James Hamilton, 7th Earl of Abercorn and Anne Plumer.

He married Elizabeth Onslow, daughter of Lt.-Gen. Richard Onslow and Pooley Walton, and they had the following children

- George Hamilton (d. 11 October 1782)
- Anne Hamilton (6 October 1755 – 18 December 1795)
- Mary Hamilton (b. 26 November 1756)
- Harriot Hamilton (11 January 1760 – 15 March 1788)
- Catherine Hamilton (b. 7 Jun 1763)
- Elizabeth Hamilton (5 June 1765 – 1843), married Glynn Wynn on 13 November 1793, without issue
- Rachel Hamilton (b. 17 Oct 1766)
- Jane Hamilton (26 Feb 1768 – 1831), married firstly on 9 August 1791 William Plumer who died in 1822, secondly in 1825 Richard Lewin who died in 1827, thirdly on 16 July 1828 Robert Ward who died in 1846
- Lady Cecil Hamilton (15 Mar 1770 – 19 Jun 1819), married John Hamilton, 1st Marquess of Abercorn
- Isabella Hamilton (28 Sep 1772 – 19 December 1852), married Lord George Seymour

== Career ==
He matriculated at Exeter College, Oxford on 19 March 1735/6 and received a BA on 5 February 1739/40. He then entered Merton College, Oxford and graduated MA in 1742.

He was appointed:

- Prebendary of Woodford and Wilsford in Salisbury Cathedral 1756
- Vicar of St Michael's Church, Bray 1759 - 1787
- Rector of Taplow

He was appointed to the fifth stall in St George's Chapel, Windsor Castle in 1783, a position he held until he died in 1787.
