= De Bray =

de Bray may refer to:

== People ==
- de Bray (surname)

== Places ==
- Pays de Bray, area in northern France

== See also ==
- Bray (disambiguation)
- Bray (surname)
