= People v. Bray =

Californian court case

- Court: California Court of Appeals
- Full case name: The People of the State of California, Plaintiff and Respondent, v. James Eugene Bray, Defendant and Appellant.
- Decided: October 27, 1975
- Citation: 52 Cal. App. 3d 494; 124 Cal. Rptr. 913

Court membership
- Judges sitting: Gerald Brown, Richard D. Ault, Martin J. Coughlin (Note: Retired; sitting under appointment)

Case opinions
- Majority: Brown, joined by Ault, Coughlin

People v. Bray, 52 Cal. App. 3d 494 (1975), was a case decided by the California Court of Appeal that allowed ignorance of a grading element to be a defense to criminal prosecution.

== Factual background ==
Defendant Bray was convicted of being a felon in possession of firearms. Bray did possess two concealable firearms, but his status as a felon was unclear. Bray had been convicted in Kansas years earlier of being an accessory after the fact, but even at trial it was unclear if this offense was a felony under Kansas law. Subsequently, when Bray was required to disclose felon status on forms for things like voting, he explained the situation and was allowed to vote in California.

== Decision ==
The Court of Appeal reversed Bray's conviction, allowing his mistake about his felony status to act as a defense to criminal liability. Under the Model Penal Code, a mistake of criminal law, like one's felony status, is not normally allowed as a defense. Instead the court treated Bray's mistake about his felony status, a grading element in the statute under which he was charged, as a mistake of fact that was an appropriate defense.

== See also ==
- Gun law in the United States
