= St Michael's Church, Bray =

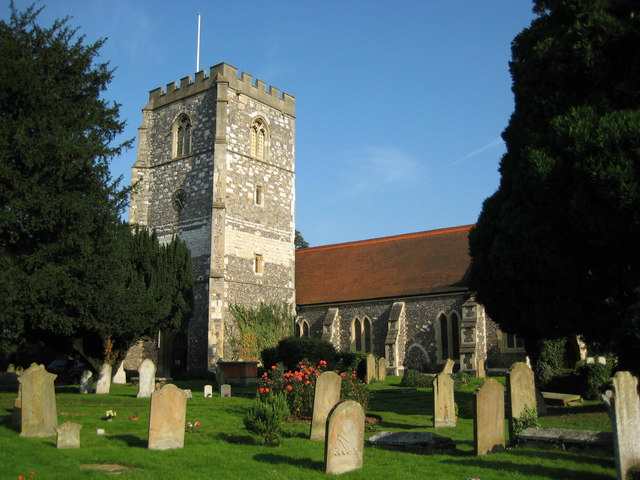
- St Michael's Church, Bray
- 51°30′32.56″N 0°42′07.07″W
- OS grid reference: SU 90169 79704
- Location: Bray, Berkshire
- Country: England
- Denomination: Church of England
- Website: braystmichael.co.uk

Administration
- Archdeaconry: Berkshire
- Deanery: Maidenhead and Windsor
- Parish: Bray and Braywood

St Michael's Church, Bray, is a Grade II* listed parish church in the Church of England in Bray, Berkshire.

== History ==
The church dates from 1293, supposedly to replace a Saxon church at Water Oakley.

It was partly rebuilt ca. 1500 and extensively restored 1857–82 by Thomas Henry Wyatt.

It has a number of sculptures which may have come from the earlier church, including a damaged Sheela na Gig.

The ecclesiastical parish shares the wider parish boundaries so is named Bray St Michael with Braywoodside.

In 1938, the royal funeral of George Mountbatten, 2nd Marquess of Milford Haven, was held at St Michael's, after which the marquess was buried in Bray Cemetery.

== Monuments ==
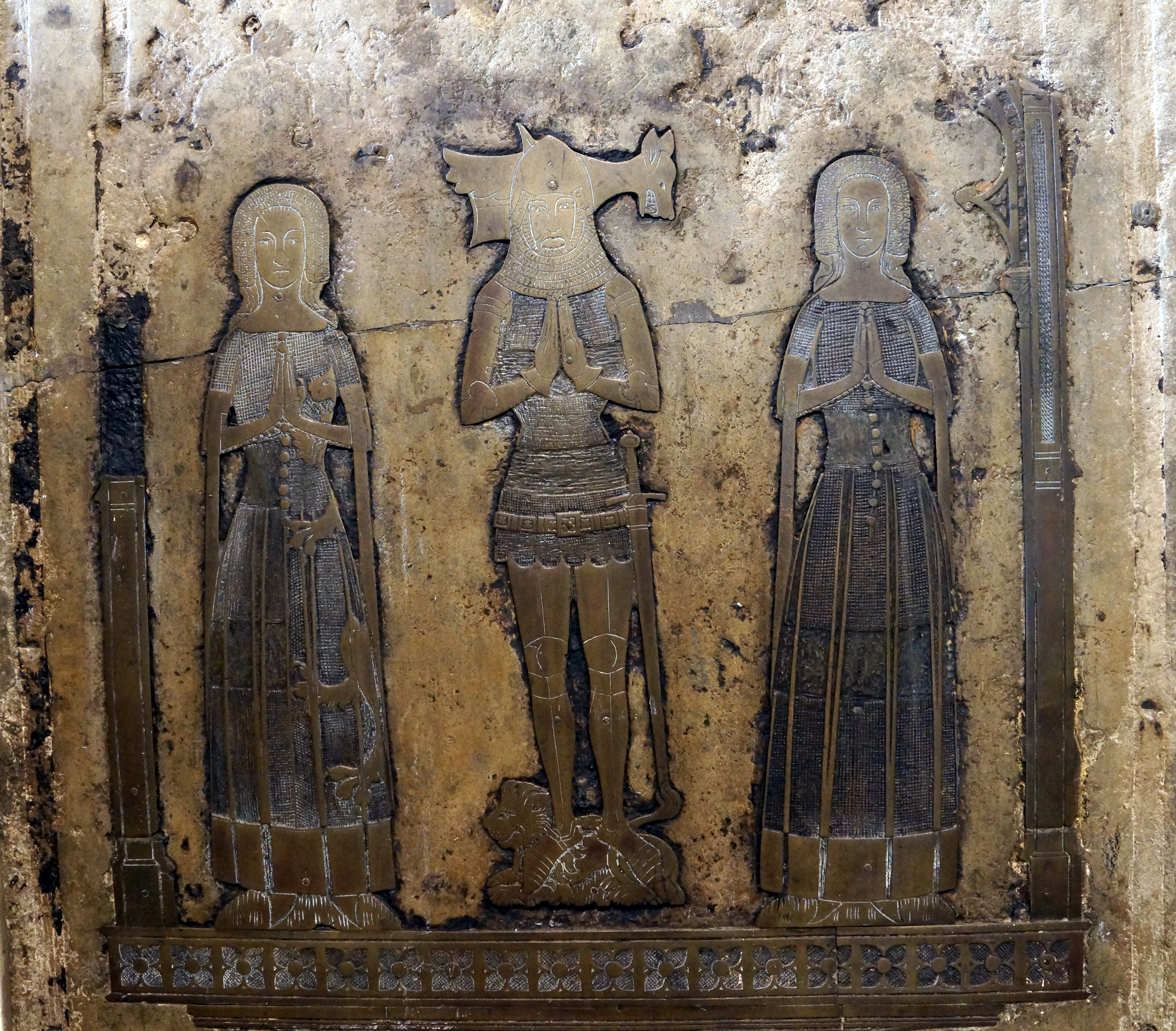
Monumental brass of Sir John Foxley and his two wives, 1378

The church contains several brasses from the fourteenth to sixteenth centuries, notably that of 1378 to Sir John Foxley, the Constable of Southampton Castle. Other monuments are:

- William Goddard of Philibert, d.1609, founder of Jesus Hospital, and Joyce Maunsell his wife, d.1622.
- Mary Hanger (d.1738) sculpted by Peter Scheemakers.

== Vicars of Bray ==
See The Vicar of Bray for the satirical description, or The Vicar of Bray (song) for the English folk song.

- Reinbald 1081
- Roger 1288
- Henry de Chilbalton 1301
- Roger de Crossby 1327
- William Scherreve 1368–75
- John Dray 1382
- Thomas Gernon 1382–96
- William Dyer 1396–1440
- Robert Manfelde 1440–43
- Thomas Pashe 1443–44
- Thomas Topclyf 1444
- Thomas Luyde 1444–54
- William Morris 1454–79
- Thomas Phillippis 1479–97
- John Perkwyn 1497
- John Halle 1504
- Richard Watts 1504–20
- John Mogeryge 1521–23
- Simon Symonds 1523–47
- William Stafferton 1548–55
- Alexander Barlo 1556
- Simon Aleyn 1557–65
- Henry Cranshawe 1565
- David Tuke 1589–99
- Edward Cranceshaw 1599
- Edward Boughton 1621–40
- Anthony Faringdon 1640–42
- Hezekiah Woodward 1649–60
- Edward Boughton 1660
- Edward Fulham 1660–62
- Francis Carswell 1665–1709
- Thomas Brown 1709–59
- George Berkeley 1759–69
- Hon George Hamilton 1769–87
- Edward Townshend 1787–1822
- Walter Levett 1822–25
- George Legge 1825–26
- Walter Levett 1826–53
- James Austen Leigh 1853–74
- William Brassey Hole 1874–87
- Charles Raymond 1887–1915
- William Riddelsdell 1915–31
- Arthur Jones 1931–45
- Edward Lowman 1945–58
- Sidney Doran 1958–77
- Neil Howells 1977–84
- George Repath 1985–2007
- Richard Cowles 2008
