= Brey =

Brey may refer to:

== People ==
- August Brey (1864–1937), German politician
- Betty Brey (1931–2015), American swimmer
- Carol A. Brey-Casiano, American librarian
- Carter Brey (born 1954), American cellist
- Claire Du Brey (1892–1993), American actress
- Leandro Brey (born 2002), Argentine footballer
- Mariano Rajoy Brey (born 1955), Spanish politician
- Mike Brey (born 1959), American college basketball coach
- Patrick Brey, Brazilian football player
- Ricardo Brey (born 1955), Cuban artist

== Places ==
- Brey, Rhineland-Palatinate, Germany
- Brey-et-Maison-du-Bois, France

== See also ==
- Bray (disambiguation)
