= Bray-lès-Mareuil =

- Commune
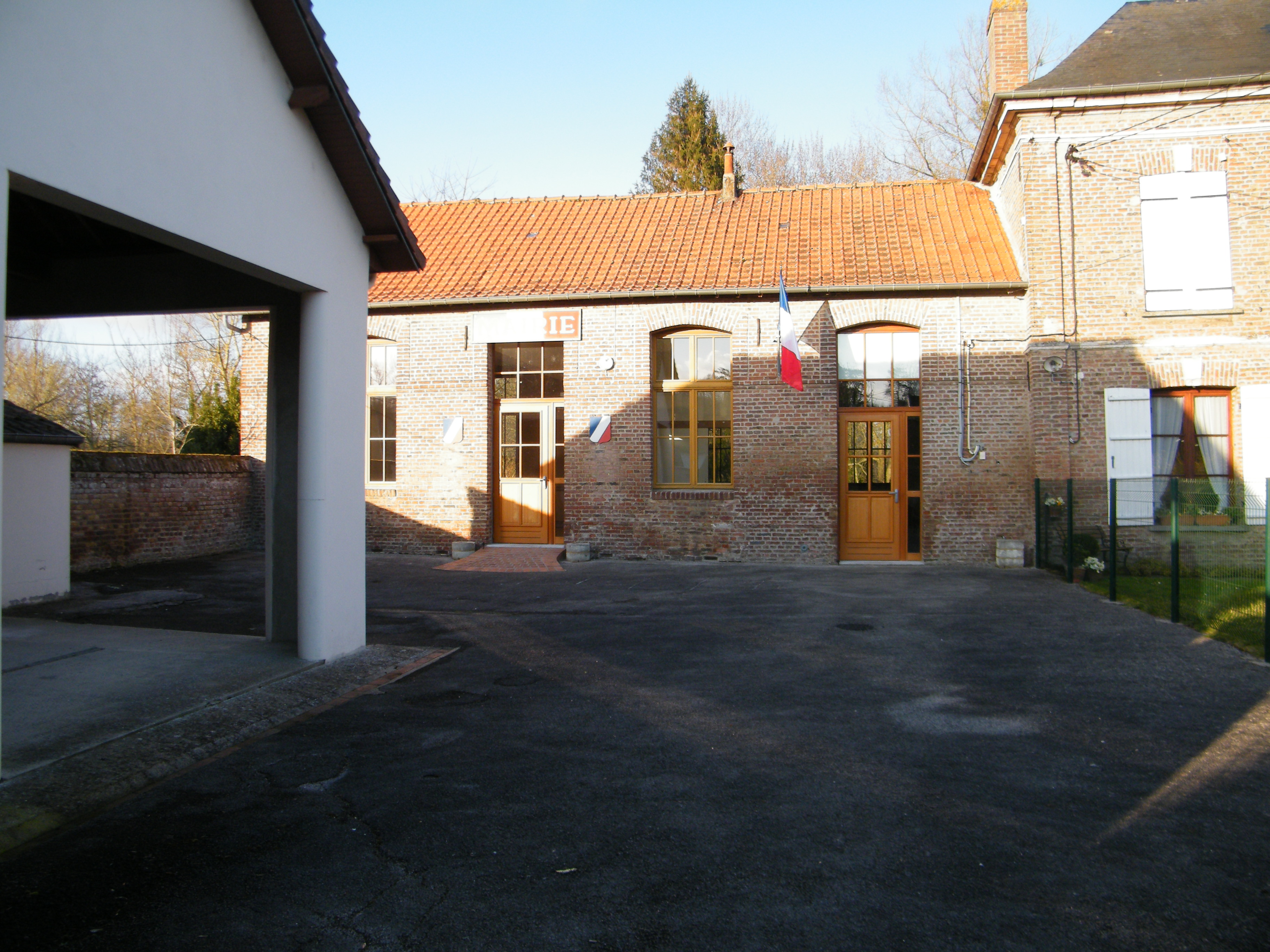
- The town hall and school in Bray

- Coat of arms
- Location of Bray-lès-Mareuil
- Location within France Location within Hauts-de-France
- Coordinates: 50°03′17″N 1°51′22″E
- Country: France
- Region: Hauts-de-France
- Department: Somme
- Arrondissement: Abbeville
- Canton: Abbeville-2
- Intercommunality: CA Baie de Somme

Government
  - Mayor (2020–2026): Maryse Dubos
- Area^{1}: 5.43 km^{2} (2.10 sq mi)
- Elevation: 42 m (138 ft)
- Highest elevation: 104 m (341 ft)
- Lowest elevation: 4 m (13 ft)
- Population (2023): 249
  - Density: 45.9/km^{2} (119/sq mi)
- Time zone: UTC+01:00 (CET)
  - Summer (DST): UTC+02:00 (CEST)
- INSEE/Postal code: 80135 /80580
- ^{1} French Land Register data, which excludes lakes, ponds, glaciers > 1 km^{2} (0.386 sq mi or 247 acres) and river estuaries.

Bray-lès-Mareuil (French pronunciation: [bʁɛ lɛ maʁœj], literally Bray near Mareuil; Picard: Bra-lès-Mareu) is a commune in the Somme department in Hauts-de-France in northern France.

== Geography ==
The commune is situated on the D3 road, some 6 kilometres (4 mi) south of Abbeville.

== Population ==
Historical population
Year	Pop.	±% p.a.
1968	273	—
1975	261	−0.64%
1982	234	−1.55%
1990	230	−0.22%
1999	221	−0.44%
2007	240	+1.04%
2012	251	+0.90%
2017	240	−0.89%
2023	249	+0.62%
Source: INSEE

== See also ==
- Communes of the Somme department
