= Simon Symonds =

English priest (died 1551)

Simon Symonds M.A. (d. 1551) was a Canon of Windsor from 1535 to 1551.

== Career ==
He was educated at Eton College and King's College, Cambridge and graduated B.A. in 1509 and M.A. in 1511.

He was appointed:

- Vicar of Elmdon, Essex 1518
- Vicar of St Michael's Church, Bray 1522–1551
- Vicar of South Petherton, Somerset, 1533–1548
- Prebendary of Lichfield 1534–1546
- Prebendary of Netheravon in Salisbury 1534
- Rector of Taplow, Buckinghamshire 1537–1551
- Prebendary of Lincoln 1544

He was appointed to the first stall in St George's Chapel, Windsor Castle in 1535, and held the stall until 1551.

Symonds was considered to be a prime candidate for the subject of the proverbial character, "The Vicar of Bray".
