= Bray Park =

Bray Park may refer to:

- Bray Park, New South Wales, town in Tweed Shire, Australia
- Bray Park, Queensland, suburb of Moreton Bay Region, Australia
- Bray Park railway station, railway station in Moreton Bay Region, Australia
