= Clonal interference =

Phenomenon in evolutionary biology

This diagram illustrates how sex might create novel genotypes more rapidly. Two advantageous alleles A and B occur at random. The two alleles are recombined rapidly in a sexual population (top), but in an asexual population (bottom) the two alleles often arise in separate lineages and compete with each other.

Clonal interference is a phenomenon in evolutionary biology, related to the population genetics of organisms with significant linkage disequilibrium, especially asexually reproducing organisms. The idea of clonal interference was introduced by American geneticist Hermann Joseph Muller in 1932. It explains why beneficial mutations can take a long time to get fixated or even disappear in asexually reproducing populations. As the name suggests, clonal interference occurs in an asexual lineage ("clone") with a beneficial mutation. This mutation would be likely to get fixed if it occurred alone, but it may fail to be fixed, or even be lost, if another beneficial-mutation lineage arises in the same population; the multiple clones interfere with each other.

== Mechanism of clonal interference ==
Whenever a beneficial mutation arises in a population, for example mutation A, the carrier of the mutation obtains a higher fitness compared to members of the population without mutation A by means of natural selection. In the absence of genetic recombination (i.e. in asexually reproducing organisms) this beneficial mutation is only present in the clones of the cell in which the mutation arose. Because of this, the relative frequency of mutation A only increases slowly over time. In large asexually reproducing populations, it can take a long time before the mutation is fixated. In this time, another beneficial mutation, for example mutation B, can arise independently in another individual of the population. Mutation B also increases the fitness of the carrier. In this context, mutation A is often referred to as the ‘original mutation’, whereas mutation B is referred to as the ‘alternative’ or ‘interfering’ mutation. Since, due to the absence of genetic recombination, beneficial mutations A and B cannot (easily) be combined into a single genotype AB, carriers of mutation A and carriers of mutation B will compete against each other. This typically leads to the loss of one of them, confirming that the fate of an advantageous mutation can be determined by other mutations present in the same population.

On the contrary, in sexually reproducing populations, both carriers of mutations A and B have a higher fitness and therefore a higher chance to survive and to produce offspring. When a carrier of mutation A produces offspring with a carrier of mutation B, the ultimately more advantageous genotype AB can arise. Individuals with genotype AB are then no less likely to reproduce than at least one of: carriers of just the A mutation or carriers of just the B mutation ─ assuming that there is no negative interaction between the two. Thus, the relative frequency of both mutations A and B can increase rapidly, and both can be fixated simultaneously in the population. This allows evolution to proceed more rapidly, a phenomenon known as the Hill-Robertson effect.

== Implications of clonal interference on adaptivity ==
When Muller introduced the phenomenon of clonal interference, he used it to explain why sexual reproduction evolved. He reasoned that the loss of beneficial mutations because of clonal interference inhibits the adaptivity of asexually reproducing species. Sex and other reproductive strategies involving recombination would therefore be evolutionary advantageous according to Muller. From the 1970s, however, biologists have demonstrated that asexually and sexually reproducing strategies yield the same rate of the evolutionary adaptivity. This has to do with the fact that clonal interference also influences another part of the reproductive strategy of a population, namely mutation rate.

Clonal interference does not only play a role in the fixation of mutations in chromosomal DNA, but it also influences the stability or persistence of extrachromosomal DNA in the form of plasmids. Plasmids often carry genes that code for traits like antibiotic resistance. Because of this, bacteria can become resistant to antibiotics in absence of genes coding for this trait in their chromosomal DNA. However, plasmids are not always adapted to their host cell, often resulting in the loss of the plasmid during cell division. Thus, the relative frequency of carriers of this plasmid in a population can decline. Nevertheless, the plasmids can also undergo mutations, resulting in competition between carriers of the plasmids. Because of this competition, the most stable plasmids will eventually get selected for and their frequency within the population will increase. This way, clonal interference influences the evolutionary dynamics of plasmid-host adaptation, resulting in faster stabilisation of plasmids in a population.

== Clinical implications and applications ==
The phenomenon of clonal interference also occurs in cancer and pre-cancer cell lineages within a patient. The heterogeneity found in cells of carcinogenic tumours implies competition between sub-populations of cells in the tumour, hence clonal interference. Population dynamics within cancer lineages are therefore becoming of increasing importance in the clinical research on cancer treatments. Furthermore, knowledge on the role of population dynamics and clonal interference, often resulting in antibiotic resistance, is being taken into account in the treatment of infectious diseases with antibiotics.

== See also ==
- Evolutionary biology
- Hill-Robertson effect
