= Thomas Bray Farm =

- U.S. National Register of Historic Places
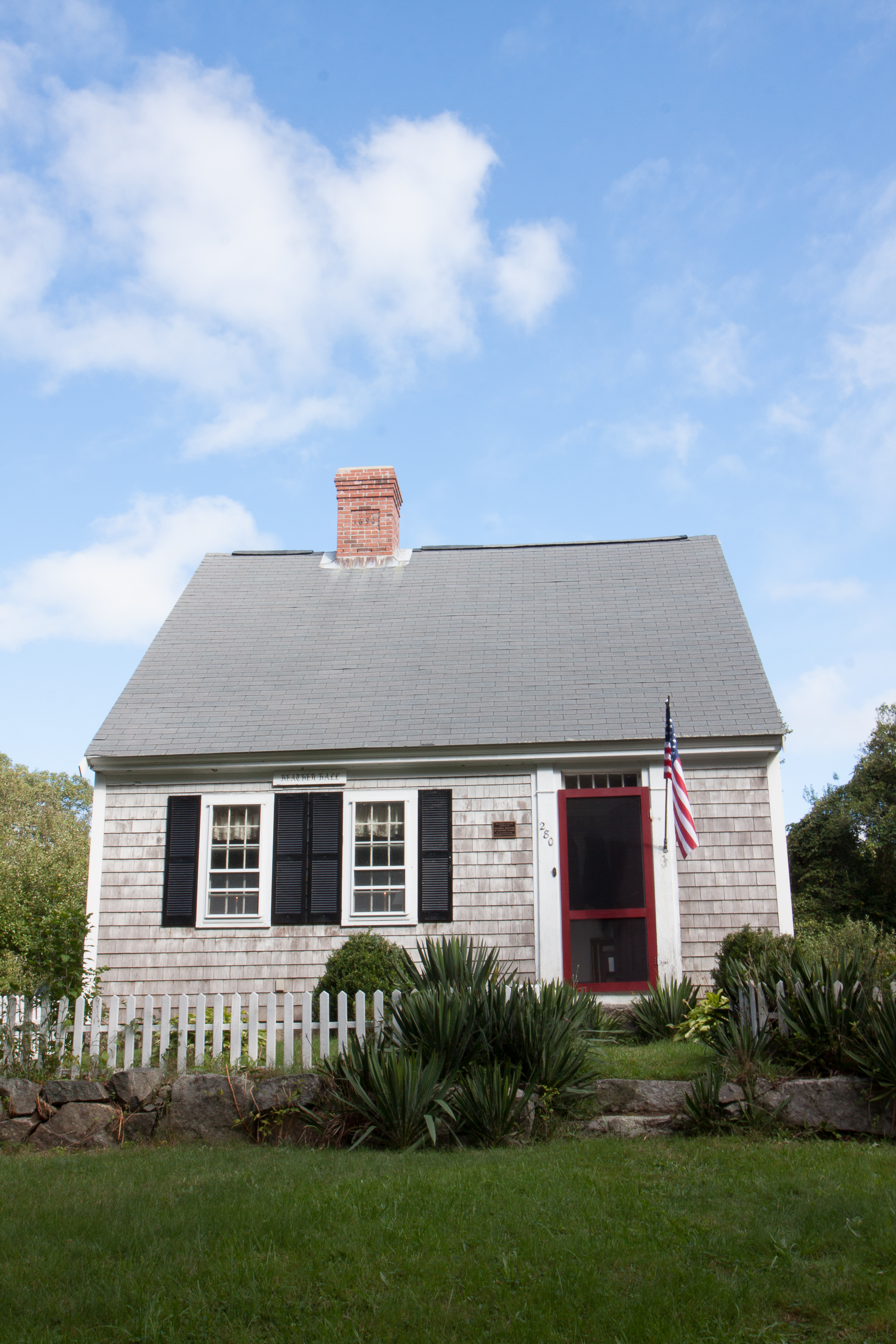

- Location within Cape Cod Location within Massachusetts Location within the United States
- Location: 280 Weir Road, Yarmouth, Massachusetts
- Coordinates: 41°42′4″N 70°12′29″W
- Built: 1720
- Architectural style: Colonial, Georgian
- NRHP reference No.: 88001455
- Added to NRHP: September 15, 1988

The Thomas Bray Farm is a historic farmstead in Yarmouth, Massachusetts. It includes a house that is one of the oldest houses in Yarmouth, as well as a number of early 20th century outbuildings, located on about 10 acres (4.0 ha) of land adjoining Mill Pond in central Yarmouth. The house construction date has been estimated to be c. 1720, but it is possibly even older. It is an early example of a "half cape", a single story house with one room behind the other, and a chimney between. In a departure from typical plans, the chimney in this house is closer to the center of the roofline, rather than being in the bay behind the front door, which is in the rightmost of three bays.

In addition to the original core of the house, there are two additions off the back which date to the early 20th century. The property also has a number of outbuildings built in the 1920s: a tractor shed, tool shed, and combination well house and root cellar are all located west of the house, and there is a duck blind near Mill Pond. They all appear to have been built from the remains of an old barn that was demolished at the time.

The property was listed on the National Register of Historic Places in 1988.

== See also ==
- National Register of Historic Places listings in Barnstable County, Massachusetts
