= Tour de Don =

Mountain in Switzerland

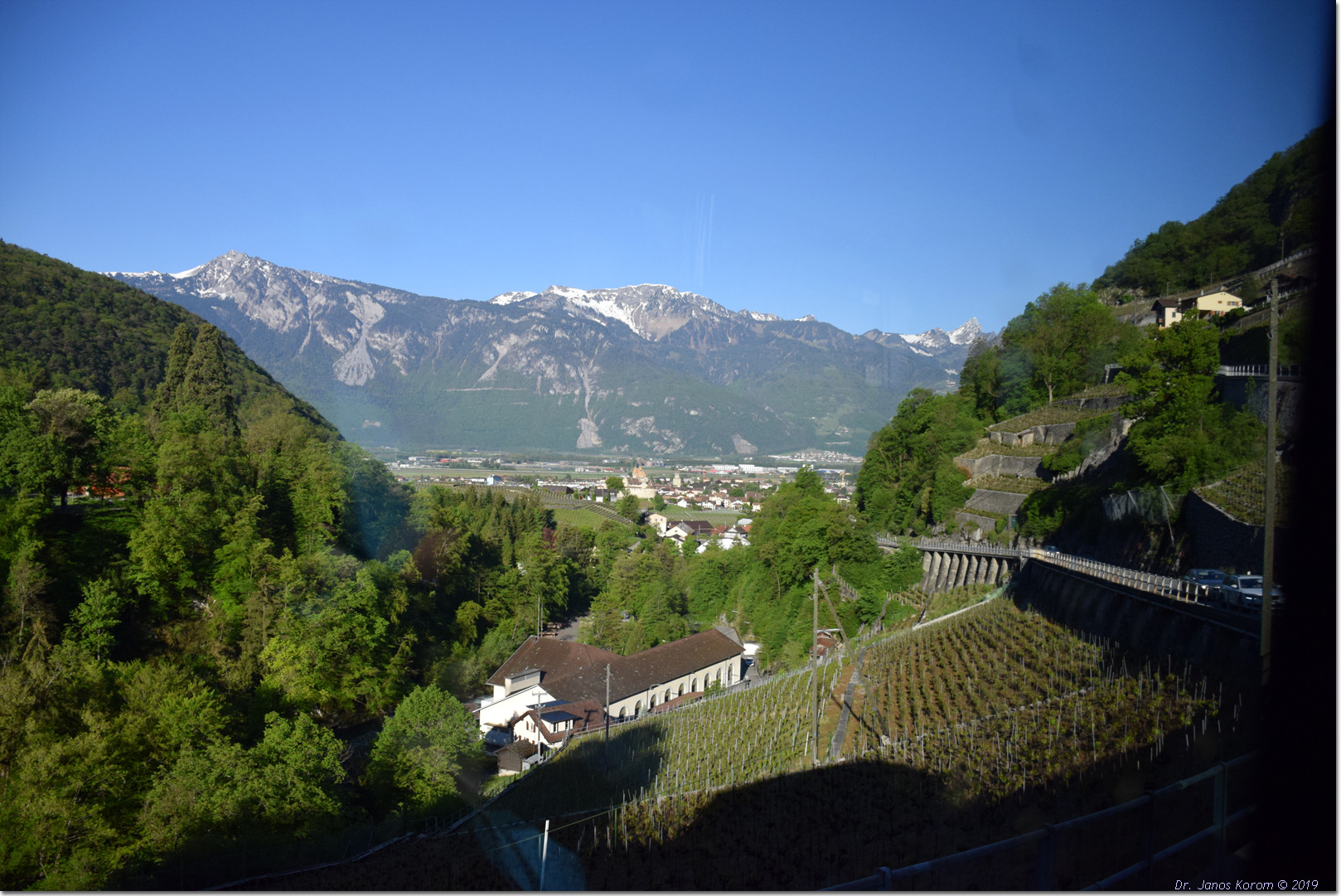
- 2019

Highest point
- Elevation: 1,998 m (6,555 ft)
- Prominence: 263 m (863 ft)
- Parent peak: Cornettes de Bise
- Coordinates: 46°17′22″N 6°51′44″E

Geography
- Location within Switzerland
- Location: Valais, Switzerland (mountain partially in France)
- Parent range: Chablais Alps

The Tour de Don (1,998 m) is a mountain of the Chablais Alps, located west of Vionnaz in the Swiss canton of Valais. The summit lies about 200 meters east of the border with France.

== See also ==
- List of mountains of Switzerland accessible by public transport
