= The Vicar of Bray (song) =

18th century British satirical song

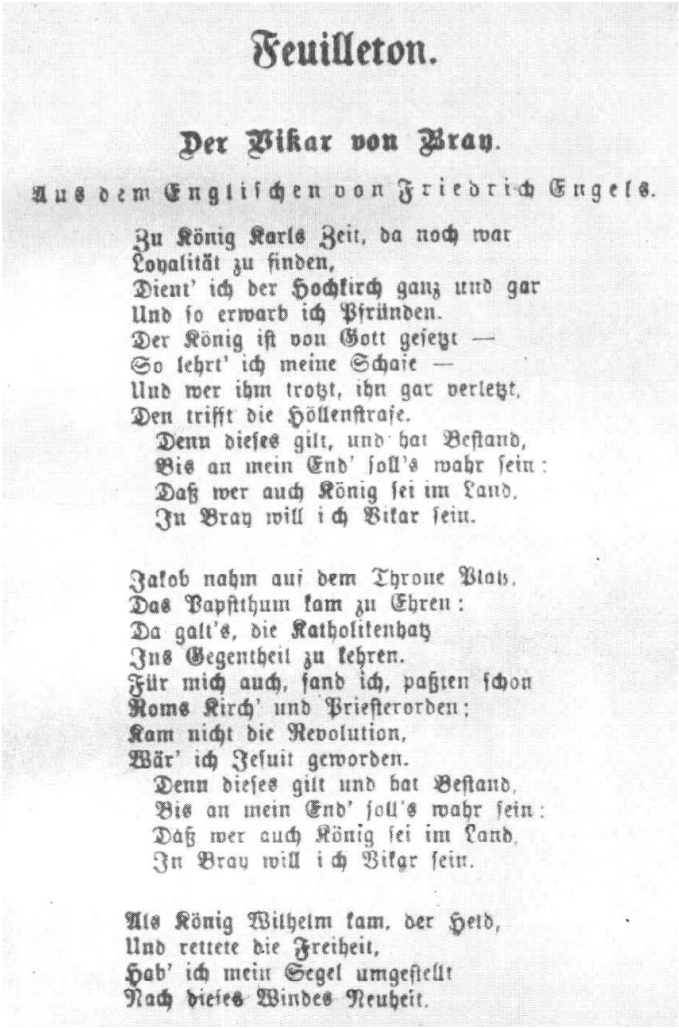
German translation by Friedrich Engels in Der Sozialdemokrat, 7 September 1882

"The Vicar of Bray" is an eighteenth century satirical song recounting the career of the Vicar of Bray and his contortions of principle to retain his ecclesiastic office despite the changes in the Established Church through the reigns of several English monarchs. The song makes many specific allusions to English religious and political doctrines and events.

== Origins and cultural influence ==
The generally known form of the song appears to have been based on an earlier version, "The Religious Turncoat; Or, the Trimming Parson". The text for "The Religious Turncoat" was published in 1706 in a book by the satirical writer Ned Ward. The expression "The Vicar of Bray, will be the Vicar of Bray still" was mentioned in 1662 by the English churchman Thomas Fuller in his book The History of the Worthies of England.

The melody is taken from the 17th-century folk melody "Country Gardens" which in turn was used in The Quaker's Opera, first printed in London in 1728, a three-act farce based on the story of Jack Sheppard which was performed at Bartholomew Fair.

A parody of this parody song, "The American Vicar of Bray", with the same chorus, was published in the 30 June 1779 edition of Rivington's Royal Gazette, mocking the shifting loyalties of some American colonists during the American Revolutionary War.

"The Vicar of Bray" is also referenced in the song "Parlour Songs" in the Stephen Sondheim musical, Sweeney Todd, although the song has been removed from more recent performances of that musical.

== Text and melody ==
In good King Charles's golden days,
When Loyalty no harm meant;
A Furious High-Church Man I was,^{1}
And so I gain'd Preferment.^{2}
Unto my Flock I daily Preach'd,
Kings are by God appointed,
And Damn'd are those who dare resist,^{3}
Or touch the Lord's Anointed.^{4}
And this is law,^{5} I will maintain
Unto my Dying Day, Sir.
That whatsoever King may reign,
I will be the Vicar of Bray, Sir!

When Royal James possest the crown,
And popery^{6} grew in fashion;
The Penal Law I shouted down,
And read the Declaration:^{7}
The Church of Rome I found would fit
Full well my Constitution,
And I had been a Jesuit,^{8}
But for the Revolution.^{9}
And this is law, &c.

When William our Deliverer came,
To heal the Nation's Grievance,
I turn'd the Cat in Pan^{10} again,
And swore to him Allegiance:^{11}
Old Principles I did revoke,
Set conscience at a distance,
Passive Obedience is a Joke,
A Jest is^{12} non-resistance.^{13}
And this is law, &c.

When Royal Anne became our Queen,
Then Church of England's Glory,
Another face of things was seen,
And I became a Tory:^{14}
Occasional Conformists base
I Damn'd, and Moderation,
And thought the Church in danger was,
From such Prevarication.
And this is law, &c.

When George in Pudding time came o'er,
And Moderate Men looked big, Sir,
My Principles I chang'd once more,
And so became a Whig, Sir.^{16}
And thus Preferment I procur'd,
From our Faith's great Defender^{17}
And almost every day abjur'd
The Pope, and the Pretender.
And this is law, &c.

The Illustrious House of Hanover,
And Protestant succession,
To these I lustily will swear,
Whilst they can keep possession:
For in my Faith, and Loyalty,
I never once will faulter,
But George, my lawful king shall be,
Except the Times shou'd alter.
And this is law, &c.

Source for the version of the song given here is The British Musical Miscellany, Volume I, 1734, as found in R. S. Crane, A Collection of English Poems 1660–1800, New York: Harper & Row, 1932.

== Notes ==
=== High Church ===
The division of the English church into "high" and "low" was significant at the time of the Restoration. The High Church resisted the Calvinistic levelling of church hierarchy that had been seen in the Commonwealth. The High Church party supported the divine right of kings, episcopal church government and establishment of the Church of England by the civil government. It was primarily Tory, and was more hierarchical than either the "low" (more Puritan/Presbyterian) or "broad" (latitudinarian or tolerant) churches. High Church in the late 17th century should not be confused with the liturgical changes sought by the Anglo-Catholic–Oxford Movement in the 19th century. Puritans, Presbyterians and Baptists favoured plainer, less sacramental, more scriptural liturgy in every era. Restoration of the Catholic style liturgy (often called 'High Church') in the Church of England is primarily a 19th-century phenomenon. In the 17th century, the High Church was devoted to the King's church, meaning that the King of England was not only the head of the church but that the church's holiness was imbued into the King's person. The King of England was not, in some sense, an ordinary mortal. The Vicar of Bray comically adapts his political and ecclesiastical beliefs to fit the successively ascendant government and church parties of his day.

=== Preferment ===
Appointment to an ecclesiastical office, or the position itself; in this case the benefice of Bray. A candidate for an ecclesiastical position was "preferred" over other applicants by those with the right of appointment, these could be church superiors or often nobles or institutions such as Oxbridge colleges (through their right to present a new incumbent to a benefice).

=== Those who dare resist ===
A reference to Oliver Cromwell and the regicides who tried and executed Charles I.

=== Lord's Anointed ===
In this case, the King, anointed (by God) in the ceremony of coronation as temporal and spiritual leader of England; it draws from the Judeo-Christian Bible, I Samuel 24. King Charles I, who had been beheaded during the English Civil War had attempted to introduce the doctrine of Divine Right of Kings to England. After the rule of Oliver Cromwell, Charles II (son of Charles I) was restored to the throne. Charles II was more moderate than his father but the leading political theorist of the absolutist side, Sir Robert Filmer (the target of John Locke's Two Treatises of Government), had argued that the king is appointed directly by God and is, by nature, inherently superior to those he ruled. Therefore, the king is anointed by God from birth (and not by the Archbishop at coronation). Charles II took no consistent position on divine right but those who restored him did and the High Church was ascending.

=== Law ===
The English Church is an Established Church, the state religion by Parliamentary law; at the time ecclesiastics could be removed for their religious and political opinions. This is the point of the song's satire, the Vicar of Bray accommodated his beliefs to conciliate the current ruler and keep his office. During this period, a difficult question was the degree to which Non-conformist and Non-juror clerics could participate in the Established Church. Non-conformists were those ministers who, though officially ordained and appointed, would not conform to the official liturgical practices. Though usually Puritans, they included many variations in religious practice.

Non-jurors were more threatening to the government, refusing to take the oath to the king as head of the church, as required by Parliament. Some Puritans felt that no man could lead a church, that divine law came from God directly to each believer. Others were of Roman Catholic leanings and did not recognise the English church's right to separate from the rest of the communion. In particular, it would be inconsistent to take the oath under Charles II (the Test Act 1673) and also under William III and Mary II, as these two oaths were contradictory. Refusing the new oaths incurred suspicion of disloyalty, while successively swearing them was derided as spineless. The Vicar of Bray is in the latter camp.

=== Popery ===
Derogatory term for Roman Catholicism, as personified in the Pope; King James II was the first Catholic monarch of England since Mary I. James's Catholic religion and attempts to revoke legal restrictions against his co-religionists caused an anti-Catholic Parliament to invite King James' daughter Mary and her husband William of Orange to rule England. William invaded England with a large army, while Parliament declared William III and Mary II to be joint King and Queen. After this Glorious Revolution, Parliament made Protestantism a condition for any monarch of Britain or Ireland. Even after the defeat of his armies in Ireland, King James and the House of Stuart still had a large following throughout the British Isles. The new regime never felt entirely safe from civil war seeking to restore the Stuart dynasty. James's son, living abroad, became known as The Old Pretender (see line 41) but his grandson, Charles ("Bonnie Prince Charlie"), The Young Pretender, proved a far more effective military commander and dangerous contender for the throne.

=== Penal Laws and Declaration of Indulgence ===
The Penal Laws were laws that upheld the establishment of the Church of England against Protestant nonconformists and Catholics. Civil penalties were imposed to those who did not conform. When James II of England and VII of Scotland issued two proclamations in 1687 (12 February in Scotland and 4 April in England), he granted broad religious freedom by suspending the penal laws. There was open resistance from Anglicans and few clergy read out the indulgence in Church. The Vicar of Bray was thus following the King rather than the Church.

=== Jesuits ===
A Roman Catholic religious order founded by Saint Ignatius of Loyola, the Jesuits were known for the excellence of their academic training, ability to argue against Protestantism using the Bible and personal vow of obedience to the Roman Pontiff. From the reign of Queen Elizabeth I the priests of the Society of Jesus were especially feared and hated by the Protestants of the British Isles. English, Scottish, Irish and Welsh Protestants viewed the Jesuits as terrorists, assassins and spies due to the Jesuit practice of sending missionaries incognito into Britain to minister to Catholics, spread the faith and bring back information. It was alleged (based on hearsay and the convictions of Jesuits for involvement in the Gunpowder Plot (1605) that the order incited revolt.

=== Glorious Revolution ===
The Glorious Revolution occurred soon after James II's ascension to the throne in 1685. James had only been king for a matter three years before he fled and the Vicar did not have long with his new faith. The Vicar was not alone in converting to open Roman Catholicism. John Dryden became Roman Catholic at this time (and was taunted by a version of the "Vicar of Bray" tale pre-dating this song) but he remained Roman Catholic to his death and defended his conversion publicly.

=== Turn'd the cat in pan ===
To change sides quickly and effortlessly. According to the Oxford English Dictionary, "to reverse the order of things so dexterously as to make them appear the very opposite of what they really are; to turn a thing right about. Obs.".

=== Allegiance ===
When William and Mary came to the throne, many Anglican clergy felt still bound by their oaths of allegiance to James II. They would accept William and Mary as regents but not as the rightful monarchs so could not swear an oath of allegiance to them. They became known as the nonjurors from the Latin iuro meaning to "swear an oath". The schism slowly declined through the 18th century.

=== "Jest is" ===
Some versions of the song give this as "a pish on" ("a piss on").

=== Passive obedience and non-resistance ===
Passive obedience is the doctrine espoused by Bishop Berkeley in 1712 that people have "a moral duty to observe the negative precepts (prohibitions) of the law, including the duty not to resist the execution of punishment". Although Berkeley made exceptions to this, the exceptions did not cover tyranny and therefore would not have excuse revoking "old principles" and changing allegiance. Bray clearly thinks this is "a joke". The term nonresistance was used to refer to the Established Church during the religious troubles in England following the English Civil War and Protestant Succession. It is "the practice or principle of not resisting authority, even when it is unjustly exercised". Bray wishes to be seen as embracing enthusiastically the new order regardless of previous oaths.

=== Tory ===
Queen Anne's first government was Whig but the Tories rose, soon to negotiate the Treaty of Utrecht to end the Whig War of the Spanish Succession. Several men of great force rose under the leadership of Robert Harley, 1st Earl of Oxford and Earl Mortimer and Henry St. John, the Viscount Bolingbroke. This is notable, because the voices of this Tory administration (including Alexander Pope and Jonathan Swift) were adept satirists and the "Vicar of Bray" was composed, most likely, by a sympathetic wit.

The idea that the Church was in danger (lines 32–33) was a common rallying cry of the Tory churchmen from 1701. The danger was from Puritans, for the most part. The Vicar's previous beliefs were of reforming, then alien sorts. (Alien meaning Catholic, a religion controlled not by Englishmen and ruled by an English monarch but by the foreign Pope, who might be under the control of foreign monarchs.) Now the Vicar worries that the Church is under threat, and he is alarmed, specifically, at the 'lies' of those who are occasional conformists (i.e. persons whose obedience is partial and likely nominal, "occasioned" not by true belief but to avoid the civil disabilities of the Penal Laws).

=== Pudding Time ===
wikt:Pudding time

OED says, "The time when pudding or puddings are to be had; (hence fig.) a time when a person is in luck; a favourable or useful time". The OED entry cites this song as an example of the phrase's use.

=== Whig ===
George I's first government was Whig. In particular, George I's rule was the zenith of Robert Walpole, the first British Prime Minister. Walpole dominated British politics and polarised the populace. Whigs monopolised power during the Walpole administration. The Whigs generally prevailed during the Hanoverian reigns, with notable exceptions. The Whigs were known for advocating religious tolerance and state sponsorship of trade. The Tories were the party of the aristocracy and the squires (squirarchy, the country estate holders). Tories accused the Whigs of taking Holland, which had become very wealthy with mercantilism and tolerance, as their model. The emergent foreign trade interests were favoured by George I, who came from modern Germany and tried to distance himself as much as possible from religious matters. His background was in a state with little monarchical control of religion and this meant that his court was disengaged. The Vicar embraces the occasional conformity that he previously thought a danger.

=== Faith's great Defender ===
The Latin title Fidei defensor was first granted by the Pope to King Henry VIII, who subsequently split the English Church from Rome; hence the double irony of the song applying it to Protestant King George. The line is even more ironic, since George I did not take stands on religious matters, preferring to practice salutary neglect of church matters. George II (king at the time of this song's setting) reduced the involvement of the Crown with the Church in general and diminished the role of Lords in church affairs; he seemed to contemporaries to be a more secular king than they had had before and certainly not a "defensor fidei".

== Historical basis of the character ==
The parish referred to in the song is Bray in Berkshire, which lies close to several sites of political and religious significance, including Hampton Court Palace and Windsor Castle. Several people have been proposed as the model for the song. Simon Symonds was vicar of Bray in 1522–1551, during the reigns of Henry VIII and Edward VI. The candidate favoured by church historian Thomas Fuller and dramatist Richard Brome was Simon Aleyn, vicar of Bray in 1557–1565, during the reigns of Mary I and Elizabeth I. Although the song alludes to events of the 17th and 18th centuries, it could be that Bray had already developed a tradition of clerical 'realpolitik' and religious pliability as defence against the turbulence of Tudor religious upheavals.

The candidate whose lifespan and career clearly correspond with the well-known lyrics is Francis Carswell, vicar of Bray for 42 years, 1667–1709, during the reigns of Charles II, James II, William III and Mary II and Anne. Carswell "was of like easy conscience" to his antecedents and remained vicar of Bray until his "dying day", through most of the events described, except the accession of the first Hanoverian king George I alluded to in the final verse. It would not be surprising if, as the song grew in popularity, an additional verse was appended to make it relevant during the mid-18th-century and beyond. Thomas Barlow has also been suggested as an inspiration for the song, but this may just be because he had a prominent clerical and academic career spanning the vicissitudes alluded to. His career did not extend into the reigns of Queen Anne or George I as implied by the lyrics.

== Sources ==
- "The Vicar of Bray" (Anonymous): Scores at the International Music Score Library Project
- A more thorough annotation, which partially informed this one.
- Another annotation
- Yet another annotation
- Historical background of the song
- Midi file of the song
