= Bray Place =

Historic house in Kentucky, United States

- U.S. National Register of Historic Places
- Location within Kentucky Location within the United States
- Location: 2227 Bashford Manor Lane, Louisville, Kentucky
- Coordinates: 38°12′17″N 85°39′39″W
- Area: 1.8 acres (0.73 ha)
- Built: c. 1800 (NRHP document); 1796 (owner claim)
- Architectural style: Federal
- NRHP reference No.: 80001595
- Added to NRHP: August 11, 1980

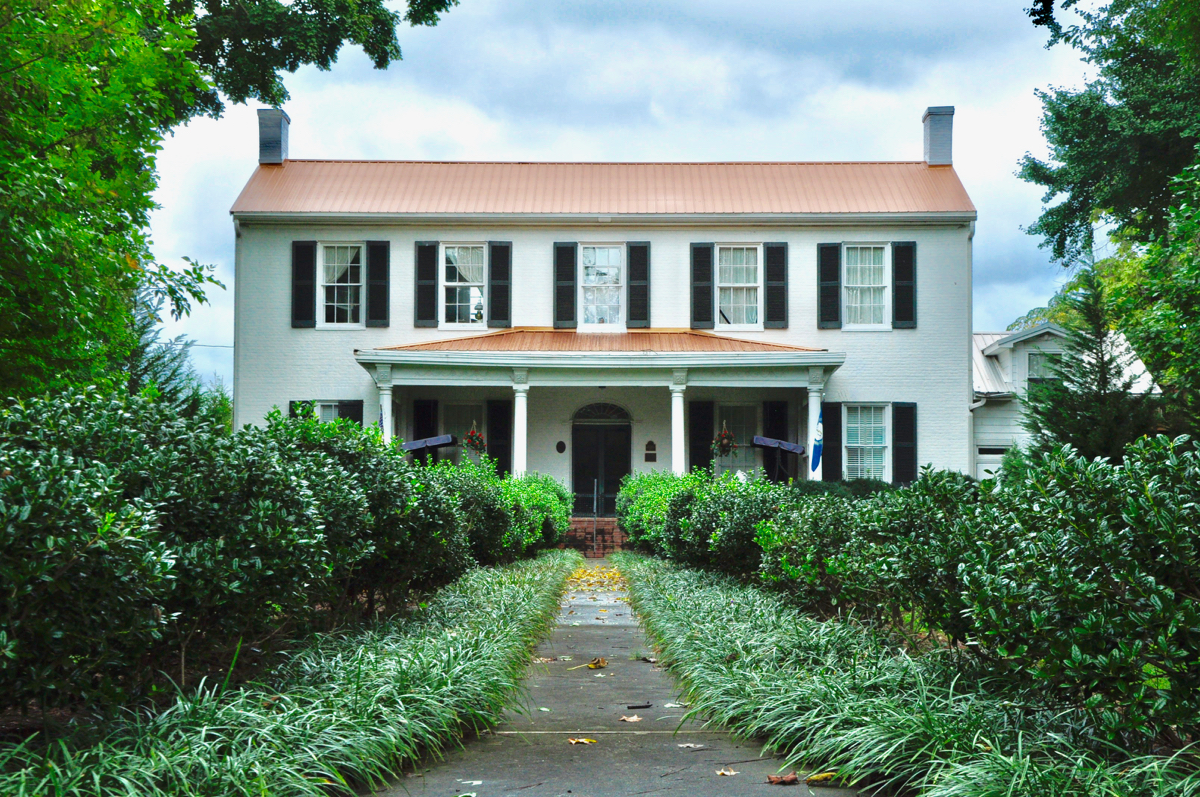
the front view of the Bray Place located on Bashford Manor Lane in Louisville, Kentucky

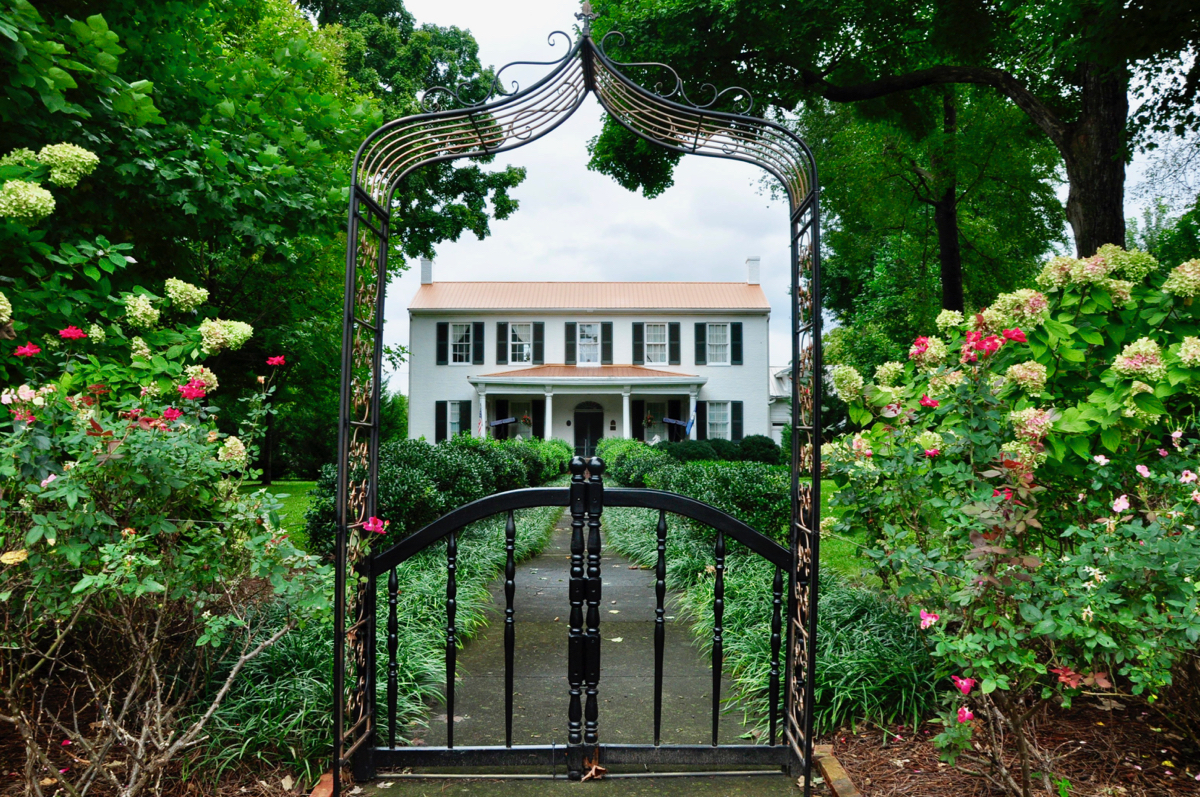
the gated entrance to the Bray Place located on Bashford Manor Lane in Louisville, Kentucky

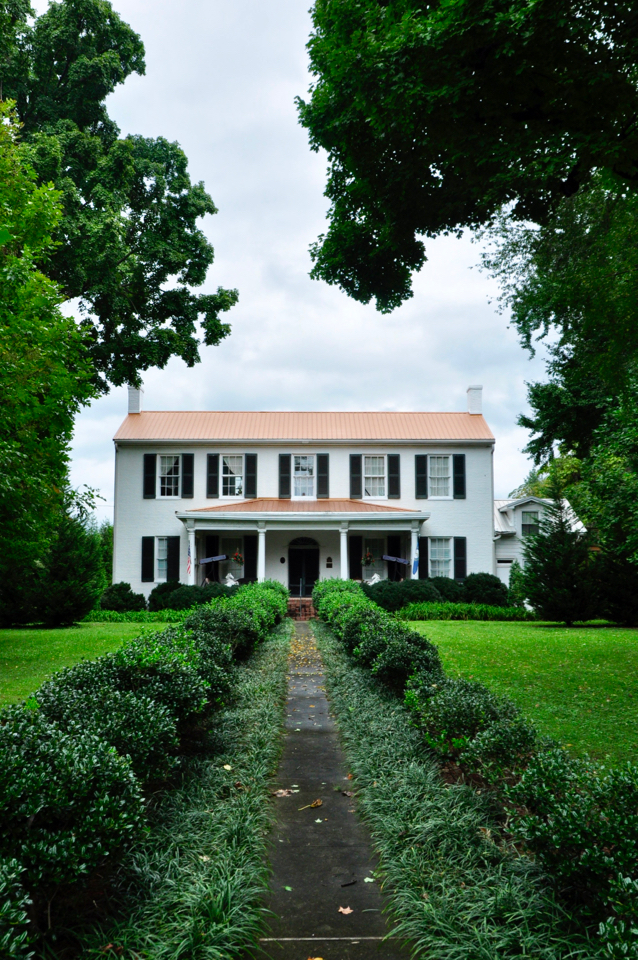
a vertical view of the Bray Place located on Bashford Manor Lane in Louisville, Kentucky

The Bray Place in Louisville, Kentucky refers to the early farmstead and home built in 1796 by Major Samuel E. Bray and his wife, Nancy Lyle Bray from Virginia. The 210 acres (85 ha) was granted by Thomas Jefferson (through William Fleming) to Bray as payment for serving in the Revolutionary War and surveying what was then Virginia. It was bordered by what is now Bardstown Road, Goldsmith Lane and Hikes Lane. The original neighbors were Edward Hikes, Andrew Hikes, and John & Lucy Speed who were parents of Joshua & James Speed. Abraham Lincoln visited the area in August, 1841 for 3 weeks after breaking his engagement with Mary Todd due to her parents’ disapproval of the match. The visit to Farmington and the neighboring Bray family restored his happiness and was known to be one of the happiest times of his life.

The property is listed on the National Register of Historic Places in 1980.

== Building details ==
The two-story home is of the same architectural style (Federal) as nearby Farmington Historic Home which was built a few years later in 1815 (and has the same setback from Bardstown Road).

The house and land have seen several changes over their lifetime. A front addition to reorient the house to face Bardstown Road was created in 1820. A front porch was added in 1890. A back porch conversion from a laundry room and servant's quarters into a structure to house the latest invention (an automobile) was made in 1914. The sun-room built off the original south-facing front door was added in 1920. Parts of the property were parceled off and sold due to pressure for suburban growth after World War II. Seneca High School and Goldsmith Elementary School were built on parcels from the farm in the 1950s. More land was sold off due to demand from the ever-growing suburbs and it was eventually reduced to roughly 2 and a half acres to create a remnant green space in its suburban context. A rain garden, extensive landscaping, along with structural improvements and cosmetic enhancements were made in 2007–2008.

Since Samuel Bray the house has also seen several changes in ownership: Milton Smith (President of L&N RR)and his wife Anna in 1885; George Scoggan (1888) who turned it into a horse farm which produced several Ky Derby contestants and a Derby winner ("Lookout" in 1893); the MODYS family (1977) who had connections to Farmington & placed the home on the National Register of Historic Places in 1980; the Sanders family (1996) who helped it become a Bellarmine Showcase Home; and Cynthia Cooke (2007) who made many improvements to the land and house and turned it into Bashford Manor Bed and Breakfast (www.bashfordmanor.com).

It is on the National Register of Historic Places.

This home is one of the oldest surviving residences within the Louisville City limits. The structure consists of 3 sections of various construction dates which combine to create a very unusual and aesthetic architectural work. It is a significant element of the community both architecturally and historically.

The original Bray dwelling was a two-story, 3 bay brick Federal structure with an asymmetric façade built c1796. The staircase in this section leads to the attic. The front door faced Beargrass Creek to the south, now leading into a 1920 sun-room addition. The main block of the house oriented to face Bardstown Road is a Federal I type structure. The construction date of this section is 1820, funded by the original Samuel Bray family. It is typical of the Federal farmhouse, with a five bay, symmetrical façade and a hall-parlor plan. The one story front porch was added c1890 by the George Scoggan family, who transformed the farm in 1888 to a horse farm/stable and thoroughbred training facility. The Victorian-style addition of c1890 is the back 1-story 3 room addition, connected on the east wall of the original structure. All parts of the house contain most of their original features, included presses that flank the fireplaces in the original section of the house.

== Ownership ==
Samuel Bray died c1845. He was a merchant and land investor, farmer and legislator, serving in 1820 on the Kentucky State Legislature.

The property went to his unmarried daughter, Nancy Chenoweth Bray, who held the farm until her death in the last months of the Civil War, February, 1865. The Farm was requisitioned as a Union encampment part of that time. Photos of civil war carvings on a huge old tree found on the property are featured in Mary Garry and Irma Raque's upcoming area history book.

Nancy Bray's sister, Evalina Bray, married Dr. Samuel Shipp, and inherited the property in 1865, to raise their family here until selling it to neighbor Milton Smith, President of the L&N Railroad, and wife, Annette in 1885.

In 1888, the Smiths sold the farm to George Scoggan in whose family it remained until 1977. George produced many Derby contenders including the famous first winner of the Futurity in 1888, Proctor Knott, the 2:1 Derby favorite of 1889... "the best bred horse in America".

A visit by Jesse James brother, Frank James, on Derby Eve 1889 to this home altered the race outcome to his advantage. Records indicate his influence on the jockey to throw the race in favor of 10:1 odds horse, Spokane. James bet $5000 to win on Spokane. The track also bet this method, while the populace bet on Proctor Knott. It was the largest attendance to date and the fastest track to date. Proctor Knott was false started twice to race an eighth mile down the track and back, then after the race began, was run against the outside rail when Spokane ran the inside rail to win by only a nose.

George Scoggan's daughter, Mary, married Alonzo Jones in 1893, a year before George died, and the couple raised five children at the house.

=== Modern times ===
Several neighboring historic homes were razed after World War II for commercial and residential development, particularly in the 1970s. Betty and Robert Modys bought it in 1977 and placed it on the National Register of Historic Places in August, 1980 (Betty was the Director of Farmington, historic home of the Speed Family, north-west neighbors of the Bray Family). The home was thus saved from post war developers who could have placed 14 homes around it. This property is the last of the area's horse farm manor houses and is protected and sustainable now as a fashionable Bed & Breakfast.

The Modys Family sold to the Sanders in 1996, who opened the home as the Bellarmine University Women's Council Show House that year. They recently sold the home (November 2007) to educator and preservationist, Cynthia Cooke.

The Bray Family history research is still underway. Letters written extensively in the 1830s are on file in the Filson Club and more information is sought, especially location of the horse and family grave yards, the surveys discovered in the attic and family photos and stories.

== See also ==
- List of attractions and events in the Louisville metropolitan area
- National Register of Historic Places listings in Jefferson County, Kentucky
