= Simon Aleyn =

Anglican Canon of Windsor, died 1565

Simon Aleyn (or Alleyn; died 17 October 1565) was a Canon of Windsor from 1559 to 1563

He was educated in Oxford and graduated BA 1539, MA 1542.

He was appointed:

- Vicar of Cookham 1553
- Vicar of Strathfieldsaye 1559

He was also Vicar of St Michael's Church, Bray, Berkshire and, according to Thomas Fuller and Richard Brome, is the likely subject of the famous ballad, "The Vicar of Bray". He was also thought to be the subject of a subsequent comic opera of the same name (written by Sydney Grundy, with music by Edward Solomon), but that opera makes no mention of Aleyn, and its text indicates that the character is actually vicar of Stanford-on-Avon and attached to the Lords of Bray whose family seat is at Stanford Hall. Mention of the Pychley and Quorn hunts places the opera solidly on the borders of Northamptonshire and Leicestershire.

In legend, Aleyn retained his benefice (c. 1540 to 1588) during the reigns of Henry VIII, Edward VI, Mary and Elizabeth, he is said to have been successively Catholic, Protestant, Catholic, and Protestant in order to fulfil his principle.

And this is law, I will maintain
Unto my Dying Day, Sir.
That whatsoever King may reign,
I will be the Vicar of Bray, Sir!

However, in reality Aleyn was only Vicar of Bray from 1557 to 1565, i.e. from the last years of the Catholic monarchs Mary and Philip into the early years of Elizabeth I.

His date of death is disputable since it appears to be 1563 in Fasti Wyndsorienses, but is given as 1565 in the online clergy database.
