= Le Linleu =

Mountain in Switzerland

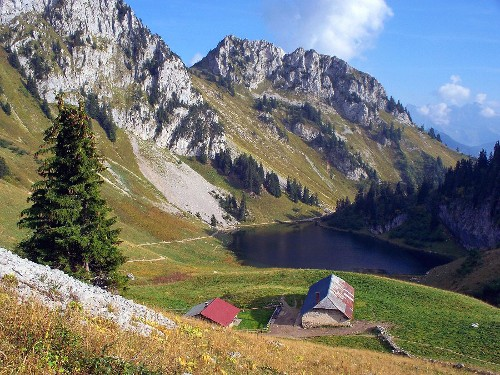
- Le Linleu (far left, summit not visible) from Lac d'Arvouin

Highest point
- Elevation: 2,093 m (6,867 ft)
- Prominence: 279 m (915 ft)
- Parent peak: Cornettes de Bise
- Coordinates: 46°18′57″N 6°49′02″E

Geography
- Location within Alps
- Location: Valais, Switzerland; Haute-Savoie, France
- Parent range: Chablais Alps

Le Linleu is a mountain in the Chablais Alps on the Swiss-French border. Towards the Swiss side, it displays a towering wall of several hundred meters, but it is easily accessible from the French side via a marked hiking path. It offers a beautiful circular panorama featuring the Diablerets, Dents du Midi and Cornettes de Bise.
