= John Bray (communications engineer) =

British engineer (1911–2004)

William John Bray CBE (10 September 1911 in Fratton, Portsmouth – 6 September 2004) was a communications engineer and director of research at the Post Office Research Station, between 1966 and 1975. In 1972 he presented the Bernard Price Memorial Lecture in South Africa. He was an early researcher of Earth–Moon–Earth communications.

== Early life ==
He was born in Portsmouth, the son of William James Bray, a naval artificer who served on HMS Achilles and his wife Emily Eliza Clothier. Brought up in Yeovil and Portsmouth, he attended Portsmouth Southern Grammar School. Then at around 16 apprenticed in Portsmouth Dockyard, he had ham radio as a hobby.

Bray as an apprentice won one of the Leonard Andrew Boyd Donaldson awards, and pursued his ambition to become an electrical engineer with a scholarship at the City and Guilds Engineering College from 1932. He graduated in 1934 and went on to an MSc(eng) degree in 1935. He went to work at the General Post Office (GPO). After induction he became a radio engineer at the GPO's Dollis Hill research facility.

== Radio engineer ==
Research carried out by Bray in these years was on single-sideband modulation, and on the rhombic antenna arrays introduced in 1937 by Harald T. Friis to create a multi-unit steerable antenna. Bray later visited Friis at the Holmdel Laboratory, and consulted him on the organisation of research.

In World War II Bray worked on radio direction finding and meaconing. He went on to sit on Consultative Committee on International Radio setting radio standards. He later wrote "The standards are a remarkable example of the ability of engineers from a wide variety of countries—including the USSR—to reach agreement". In the television field, Bray developed the TV detector van.

== Later life ==
Bray in 1954 was moved to the GPO Radio Planning and Provision branch, with headquarters in central London, as its head. His responsibilities included the design of the Post Office Tower, completed in 1965. In the field of communications satellites, he headed the GPO's effort from 1961, put in charge of the Goonhilly Satellite Earth Station project ahead of the Telstar launch in 1962. No radome was used. It became the world's leading satellite Earth station by traffic.

Brought back to Dollis Hill, Bray was moved into the direction of research, and in 1966 was appointed director there. He began work on the Martlesham Heath Post Office Laboratories. The GPO was abolished by the Post Office Act 1969, and eventually in 1981 British Telecom was spun out of the Post Office. By then the new Post Office Research Station at Martlesham had been opened, in 1975; it is now known as Adastral Park.

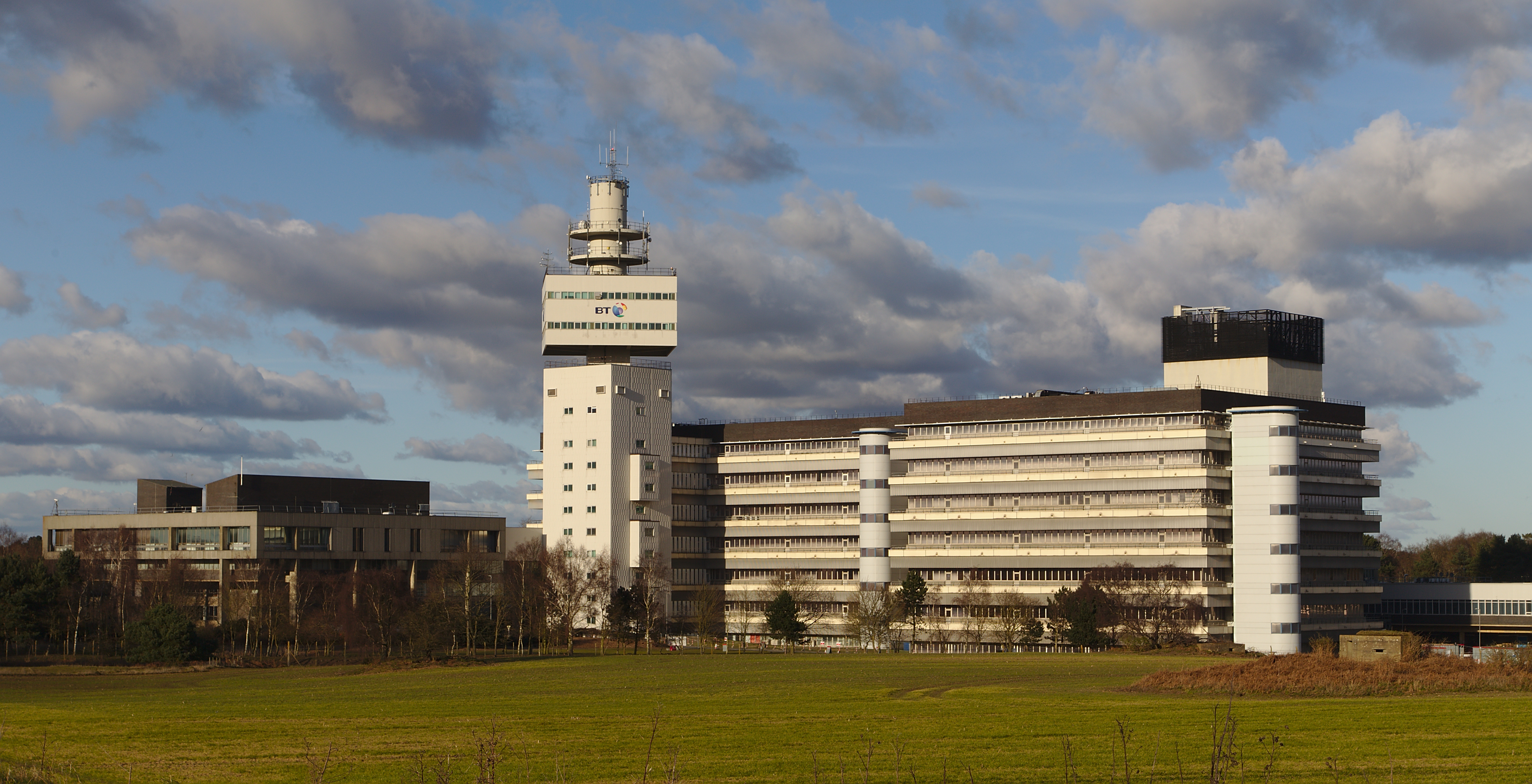
Adastral Park, main complex, 2016 photograph

Bray gave a Mildner Lecture, named for Raymond Charles Mildner (1907–1977), at the Martlesham Post Office Research Station, in which he announced "Viewdata" for videotex. This was the Prestel system invented by Samuel Fedida of the Research Centre. It was "an early version of the internet".

== Articles ==
- Bray, W.J. and Lowry, W.R.H. (1939). A New Short-wave Transatlantic Radio Receiver. POEEJ 32 (1): 24-31
- Bray, W.J. (1948). The Possibilities of Super-High-Frequency Radio and Waveguide Systems for Telecommunications, IPOEE Printed Paper No. 197, 1948.
- Booth, C.F. and Bray, W.J. (1949). A report on microwave radio relay and waveguide systems studied in USA. Report by Experimental and Development Branch of Post Office Engineering Department. (Copy held in UK National Archives WO 195/10701.)
- Bray, W.J. (1950). A Survey of Modern Radio Valves. Part 6(a). Valves for Use at Frequencies Above 3,000 Mc/s, POEEJ 43 (3): 148-153
- Bray, W.J. (1951). A Survey of Modern Radio Valves. Part 6(b). Valves for Use at Frequencies Above 3,000 Mc/s, POEEJ 43 (4): 187-191

== Books ==
- Bray, J. (1995). The Communications Miracle: Telecommunications Pioneers from Morse to the Information Superhighway, Perseus Books, ISBN 0-306-45042-9
- Bray, J. (1999). Then, Now and Tomorrow: The Autobiography of a Communications Engineer, The Book Guild Ltd, ISBN 1-85776-481-1
- Bray, J. (2002). Innovation and the Communications Revolution, Institution of Electrical Engineers, ISBN 0-85296-218-5
