= Ola Labib =

British comedian

- Born: 1988 or 1989 (age 37–38); Portsmouth, Hampshire, England
- Occupation: Comedian

Ola Labib (Arabic: علا لبيب) is a British comedian. Born in Portsmouth, she became a pharmacist after failing to get into medical school, and spent more than seven years working in the National Health Service (NHS). An incident in which she administered the wrong medication to a patient prompted her to reconsider her career, and she became a comedian after a chat with her brothers. She was a finalist during the 2019 Beat the Frog World Series and at the 2021 Funny Women awards, and performed at the UK's first socially distanced comedy show in July 2020. Her stand-up regularly discusses her experiences as a hijab-wearing Muslim of Sudanese descent. Labib has also presented the 2024 London Eid in the Square festival.

== Life and career ==
=== Early life and pharmacy ===
Labib was raised in Portsmouth, England, where she attended a strict Islamic primary school followed by Portsmouth's Priory School, where she was the only African Muslim in the school. Her mother worked twelve-hour shifts as a factory worker, while her father taught mathematics at a secondary school. She has brothers, including one who is a doctor; Ola attempted to get into medical school herself, but was unsuccessful, so became a pharmacist, and took up late shifts at an understaffed hospital. In 2021, she noted that she had been working in hospitals for "over seven years".

I had a consultant request a medication history for a patient and I couldn't say no to a consultant. So I put the mammoth pile of work aside, and found the patient's file which had a GP print-out of their medication. [...] This would save me having to contact the GP. So I quickly endorsed all the medication on the patient's drug chart and gave it to the junior doctor to sign off—only to realise the next day that that was the correct medication list ... for a completely different patient. I wanted to throw up. The error resulted in the patient getting seriously ill.

— Labib, talking to WePresent

While working in the NHS, she experienced numerous incidents of racism and bigotry, including one incident where a patient refused to understand her despite Labib talking more and more loudly, before requesting a translator on the incorrect grounds that Labib had an incomprehensible Indian accent. She decided to become a stand-up comedian after giving a patient the medication for a different patient, and said that blunder had made her not eat or sleep for days afterwards. After entering crisis talks with her brothers and telling them that her passions were beauty and comedy, one of them opined that the beauty industry did not suit her, causing her to subsequently fantasise about a career in comedy, particularly during her lowest points at work.

=== Comedy career ===
One January, with her birthday impending, Labib applied for every open spot in Manchester she could find; her first set was at an open mic at Comedy Balloon, a comedy club based at the Ape and Apple in Manchester. Her set comprised her first visit to a pub, and opened with the line "I bet you've never seen a hijabi in a pub before; I think the last time anyone saw hooded figures going into a pub was Frodo at the Prancing Pony"; the promoter was a Lord of the Rings fan and asked her to return, and the joke landed well enough to feature in subsequent sets. For a time, she was billed as "the UK's only Black, Muslim, Sudanese female comedian" and later "the UK's first", though later she tired of the phrase.

In 2019, Labib contested the Beat the Frog World Series Final, mounted at the Frog & Bucket in Manchester, using a set based on her experiences as a hijabi of Sudanese heritage which contained references to Shamima Begum and grooming gangs. She would return to the premises in July 2020 after that venue was selected to mount the UK's first socially distanced comedy show, performing alongside Kiri Pritchard-McLean, Shazia Mirza, Sian Davies, and Barbara Nice, though regional restrictions would cause the venue to close again shortly afterward. In 2021, Labib placed third in that year's Funny Women awards, using a set about the prejudices she faced as a Sudanese hijabi. Reviewing her set, Chortle's Steve Bennett opined that her set was "slick and well-polished[,] with the exception of the gear-crunching segue 'talking of Sex Bombs, I wasn't one when ... '".

In December 2021, Slim, Thanyia Moore, Labib, Babatunde Aléshé, Eddie Kadi, Nana Ntorinkansah, Stephen Asamoah-duah, David Ohene-Akrasi, and Charles Mensah Bonsu performed at The O2 as part of Mo Gilligan & Friends: The Black British Takeover, which aired on Channel 4 in October 2022, and in February 2022, Labib withdrew from medical work to focus on comedy full-time. In October 2022, she, Sophie Duker, Dane Baptiste, Thanyia Moore, Big Zuu, Jason Forbes, Kemah Bob, and Darren Harriott appeared on Dave's Just Jokes, a programme broadcast to mark Black History Month, in which they shared anecdotes on growing up and breaking into comedy. In early 2024, she appeared on an episode of World's Most Dangerous Roads with Mike Wozniak, another Portsmouth-based comedian, with whom she exchanged local slang, and in April 2024, she hosted that year's London Eid in the Square.

== Personal life and artistry ==
In 2014, Labib saw Ramey Dawoud performing in Faisal Goes West at Hackney Picturehouse. After following him on social media and finding that her direct messages were going unanswered, she visited him at a TED talk in Sudan on 12 July 2016, where she tried to pretend she did not know who he was – only for her younger brother to blurt out that she was a regular visitor to his Instagram account. The pair later married, and she moved to Manchester. Labib has family in Sudan, and took a month-long break from performing in April 2023 due to anxiety caused by war breaking out in that country. In a 2022 interview, she stated her "biggest hero and influence" is her father, on the grounds that the way he told stories could "keep people listening for hours and hours", and said in an interview the following year that Dave Chappelle, Ricky Gervais, and Slim were among her comedy heroes and that Gervais' comments about cancel culture had resonated with her, because there were "loads of jokes" she wanted to tell but could not.
