= Priory School, Portsmouth =

Priory School
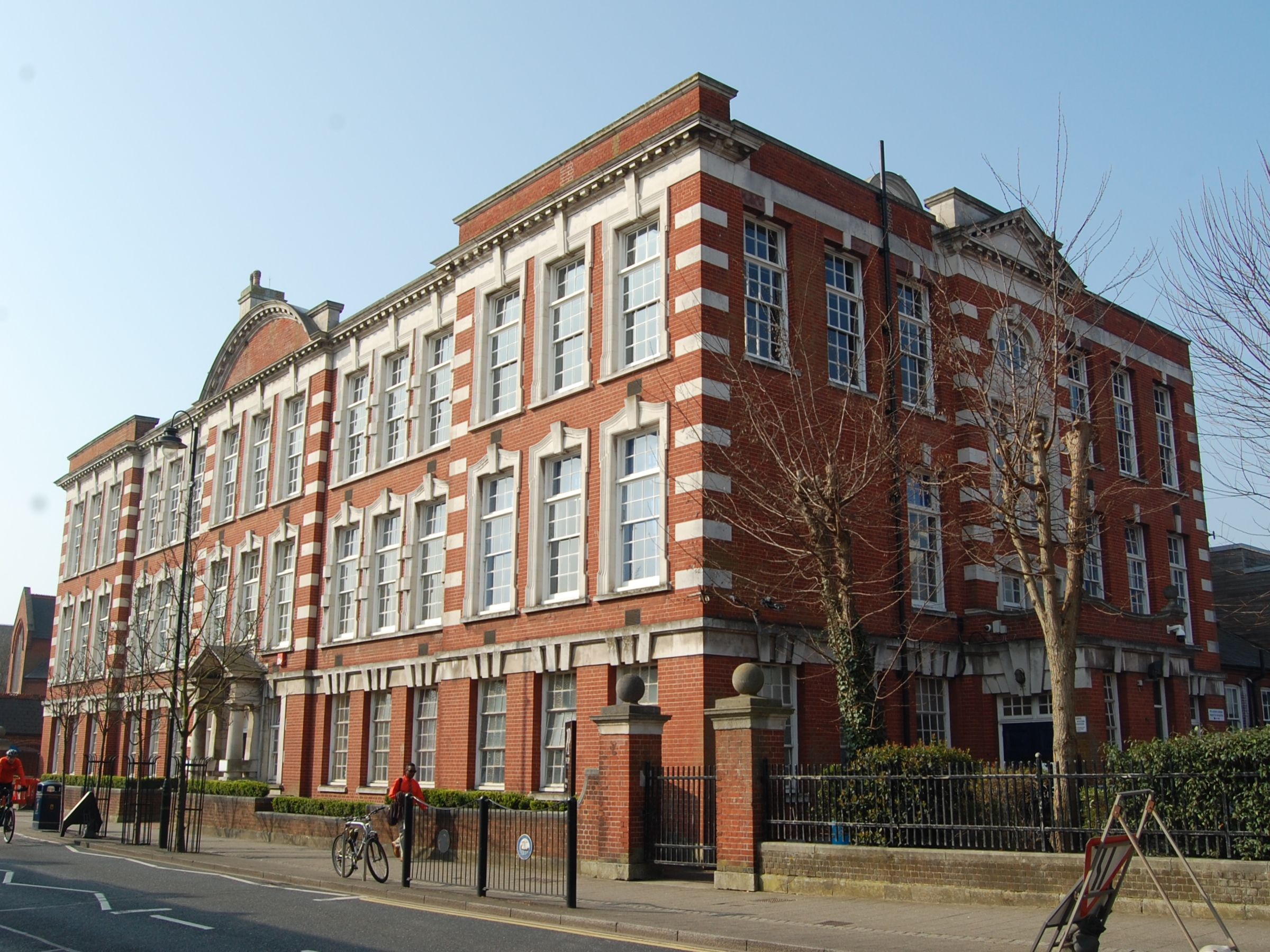
- The school in March 2019

Location
- Fawcett Road; Southsea, Hampshire, PO4 0DL; England

Information
- Type: Academy
- Motto: Enjoy Respect Achieve
- Religious affiliation: Non-Affiliated
- Established: 1974 (1888)
- Local authority: Portsmouth
- Department for Education URN: 141175 Tables
- Ofsted: Reports
- Head teacher: Stewart Vaughan
- Gender: Coeducational
- Age: 11 to 16
- Enrolment: 1218
- Houses: Tenacity, Equity and Affinity
- Colours: Black and White
- Former name: Portsmouth Southern Grammar School for Girls
- Website: http://priorysouthsea.org

Priory School is a secondary school in Southsea, Hampshire, England. It is situated in the northern area of Southsea bordering Fratton, and lies close to Fratton railway station on the A2047. Stewart Vaughan is the Headteacher at the school. Priory school is an academy and part of the Bohunt Education Trust.

== History ==
The current site was originally purchased by the Portsmouth School Board in May 1890 for £3000, at the time the area was known as "The Wilderness" due to the lack of development activity. On the site were several buildings in a heavy state of disrepair, among the buildings were Howard's Cottage reputedly the oldest building in Portsmouth and home to the ghost of Lady Temple.

The construction of the school cost £9,704 and took two years, the buildings were completed in May 1892. Later extensions of the school site led it to cover the site of an old priory and a farm called Priory Farm.

In 1905 it was decided that the Francis Avenue School for girls should move to a building next to the boys school. This school, which cost £25,000 to build, was opened on 4 November 1907.

During the First World War, the building was requisitioned by the War Office to create the 5th Southern General Hospital, a facility for the Royal Army Medical Corps to treat military casualties.

During the 1920s the school became heavily over-crowded and an extension to the girls school was completed in 1934. Portsmouth was considered a high-risk target during the Second World War and the girls school moved to Salisbury. On 10 January 1941, German bombing led to the destruction of the boys school and the extension at the girls school. The boys moved to the St Ronan's Road School, with the old boys school being left as a bombed out wreck for the next twenty years.

In 1946 the girls school became the Portsmouth Southern Grammar School for Girls. The Southern Grammar School for Boys was on Eastern Road and went on to be part of Portsmouth College.

In the late 1950s the boys school was demolished and replaced with a gymnasium for the girls school. A lecture theatre was completed in the 1960s.

In 1974 the boys school returned to the site, this time merging with the girls school to form Priory comprehensive school. The school became a specialist sports college with the opening of the Priory Tennis Centre in 2006 and it became an academy, sponsored by the Bohunt Education Trust, in September 2014.

== Notable former pupils ==
- Jim Al-Khalili, Professor of Theoretical Physics at the University of Surrey
- John Bray, director of research at the Post Office Research Station
- Ben Close, professional footballer who plays for Doncaster Rovers FC
- Ola Labib, comedian
- Tommy Leigh, professional footballer who plays for Accrington Stanley FC
- Stephen Morgan, MP For Portsmouth South
- Dan Nlundulu, professional footballer who plays for Southampton FC
- Jake Thomson, former professional footballer

=== Portsmouth Southern Grammar School for Girls ===
- Marilyn Cole, January 1972 Playmate of the Month, and Playmate of the Year 1973

=== Notable former teachers ===
- Mary James (educator), 1970-4 (at the girls' school)
