= TV detector van =

Van used to detect the presence of a television set

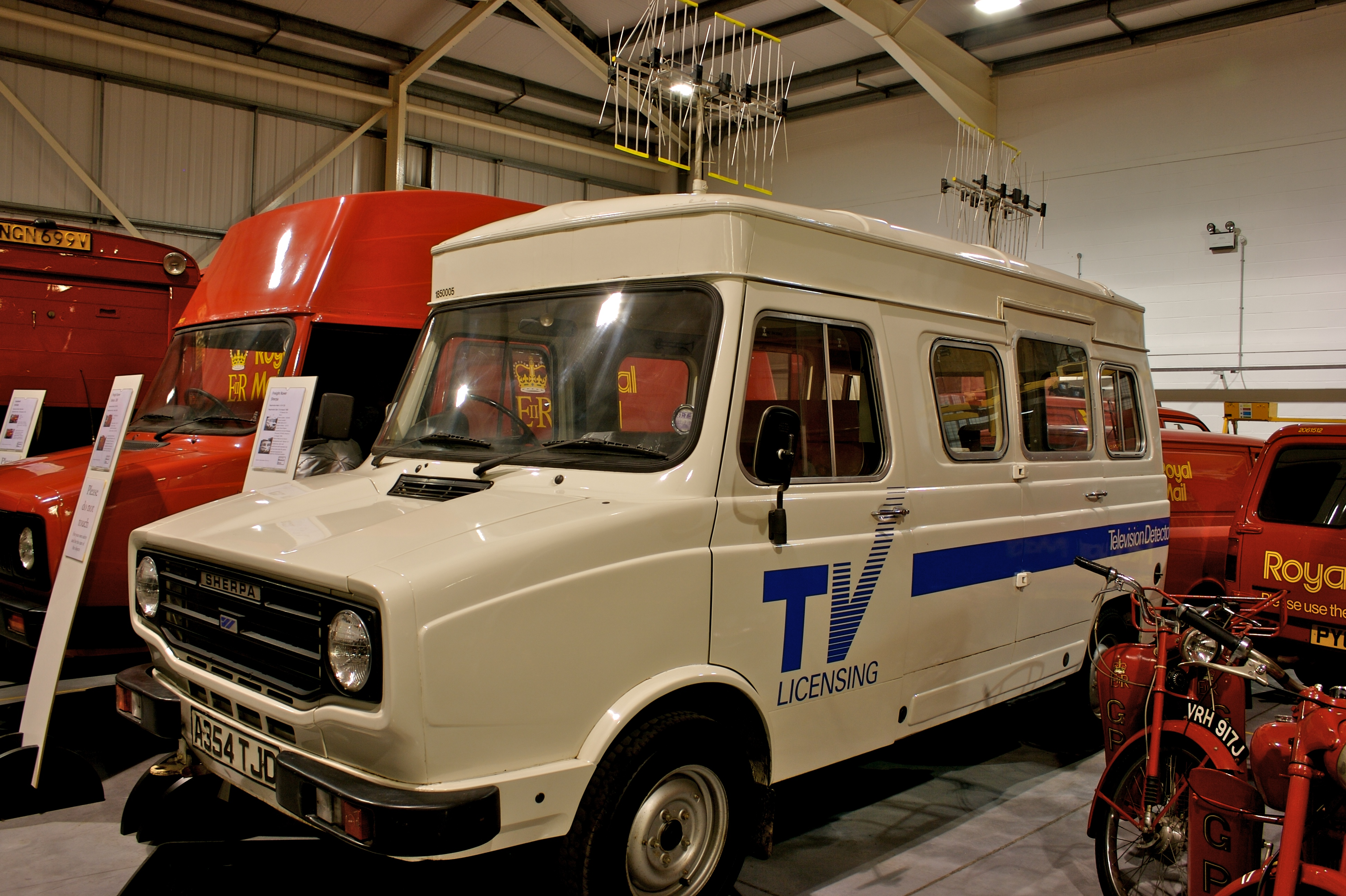
A 1983 Leyland Sherpa television detector van displayed at the Postal Museum, London

TV detector vans are claimed to be vehicles used by the General Post Office and later by contractors working for the BBC to enforce the television licensing system in the UK, the Channel Islands and on the Isle of Man. According to the BBC, they contain equipment that can detect television sets in use in private homes. While the presence of the vans was widely publicized in 20th century Britain, and the technology they allegedly use has been described in official documents, the media have often speculated that detector vans are a scare tactic and do not really contain any TV-detecting equipment.

== History ==
When television broadcasts in the UK were resumed after a break due to World War II, it was decided to introduce a television licence fee to finance the service. When first introduced on 1 June 1946, the licence covering the monochrome-only single-channel BBC television service cost £2 (equivalent to £72.42 as of 2025). The licence was originally issued by the General Post Office (GPO), which was then the regulator of public communications within the UK. Since it was not possible to stop people without a licence from buying and operating a TV, it was necessary to find ways of enforcing the TV licence system. One of the methods used to identify TV use without a licence was TV detection equipment mounted in a van.

The first TV detector van was unveiled on 1 February 1952. In the 1950s, the Post Office, which then administered the TV licensing system, ran converted Hillman Minx and Morris Oxford estate cars, which had large aerials attached to their roofs. Subsequently, Commers were introduced. In the 1980s, vans were supplied by Dodge and Leyland. In the 1990s, Ford Transits were introduced. In 2003, TVL launched its 10th model of detector vans. It was stated that these vans had removable branding so that they could operate covertly.

Although no operating principles for the TV detectors said to be used in these vans were revealed by the BBC, it was thought that they operated by detecting electromagnetic radiation given off by a TV, although "more usually, the authorities receive details of TV sales from the dealer". The most common suggested method was the detection of a signal from the TV's local oscillator.

In 2013, the Radio Times obtained a leaked internal document from the BBC giving a breakdown of prosecutions for TV licence evasion. The 18-page document gave a breakdown of the number of people evading the charge, as well as mentioning the number of people employed to catch those who do not pay their television licence. No mention was made of TV detector vans being used to catch such people, prompting media speculation over the truth of their existence. In response a BBC spokeswoman rejected claims that the vans are a hoax: "Detector vans are an important part of our enforcement of the licence fee. We don't go into detail about how many there are or how they work as this information might be useful to people trying to evade the fee."

== Detection techniques ==
Around ten generations of detector van technology were used. The first three were described in The Post Office Electrical Engineers' Journal.

=== Line-scan ===
The first detector was introduced in 1952. It operated by detecting the magnetic field, rather than any radio signal, of the horizontal line-scanning deflection within the cathode ray tube. Television tubes, unlike oscilloscopes, used magnetic deflection. The deflection current was a sawtooth with a frequency of 10.125 kHz.

As this was the horizontal deflection, the magnetic field lines were almost vertical. Three small horizontal loop antennae were thus used to detect it, mounted on the roof of the detector van. These were arranged in an L shape, manually switched in two pairs of either diagonally front-back and side-side. The coils, and their receiver, were tuned to a fixed frequency of 20.25 kHz, the second harmonic of the line-scan signal, with a bandwidth of 200 Hz. The line-scan frequency was generated within the TV as a multiple of the mains frequency and could vary slightly long-term. This bandwidth was chosen to allow reception of a varying frequency, yet also to exclude as much ignition noise from the van's engine as possible. This ignition interference was the source of the main limitation on the detector's performance. The second harmonic frequency was chosen as it allowed the use of commercially available radio receivers, whilst avoiding both excessive ignition interference at the fundamental frequency, or confusing long wave radio carriers with the higher harmonics. The received signal was mixed with a local beat frequency oscillator (BFO) to produce an audible 1 kHz beat frequency, just as is done for CW Morse radio reception. The operator detected signals by listening on headphones and a meter gave an indication of signal strength.

To operate the detector, it was driven along the road past target houses. As an operating TV was approached, the signal increased. The operator could switch between pairs of the antennae, giving a peak sensitivity either ahead of the van, or to the side. When the two combinations were of equal strength, the van was alongside the house. A similar comparison could tell if the TV was to the left or right of the street. As the TV tube was being detected directly, the location of the TV aerial made no difference.

=== VHF ===
By 1963 the second British TV network, ITV, had begun transmission. This made the original system of TV detection increasingly unworkable. The two networks did not have their line-scan signals accurately synchronised. If two nearby TVs were each tuned to different channels, (Note: The different TV signals were the issue, rather than receiver frequencies.) they then created a beat frequency effect which could swamp the TV detector. The original magnetic low-frequency detector system was also suffering because TV design had improved to radiate less of a magnetic field, and also the increasing number of cars made interference from their ignition circuits greater.

A new detection system was required and this would rely on detecting leakage signals from the local oscillator used in superheterodyne radio receiver circuits. Transmissions at this time were on the 405-line system and used the Band I (47 to 68 MHz), Band II (87.5 to 108.0, VHF / FM sound-only radio (Note: Radio licences were required in the UK until 1971, see Television licensing in the UK, and detection services could also search for unlicensed VHF radio receivers.)) and Band III (174 to 240 MHz) VHF bands. Because of the broadness of the TV transmission bands, and variations in the intermediate frequencies used, a detector receiver could have needed to be tunable between 29 and 240 MHz. By detecting either the fundamentals of Band III, or the harmonics of Bands I and II, the detector system managed to make do with only 110–250 MHz.

The antenna on the detector car was a rotatable, highly directional antenna. It was used by taking bearings on the TV set from multiple locations and triangulating them. Its detection range was several hundred yards, although usually only a few houses distance on a built-up street. (Note: In rural areas, the obvious approach of a detector car often caused the TV set to be switched off immediately and so long range was of little practical use.) As the polarisation of the leaked signal was unpredictable, the detector aerial had to be able to receive mixed or elliptical polarisation. This was achieved with a dipole antenna which was tilted diagonally, placed in front of a metal mesh corner reflector, the whole assembly of which could be rotated. The beam width was narrow enough to give an accuracy of around 5° in locating a source. The complete antenna was large, and permanently mounted on top of a Morris Oxford Traveller estate car, rather than the previous van, so that the overall height of 9 ft 9 in (3 m) was no more than a typical large van, avoiding height clearance problems. It was mounted on a 2" diameter aluminium tube mast, rotated manually by a handwheel. The receiver and display were built into a single box, mounted where the front passenger seat had been. The operator and a Postal And Telegraph Operator, (Note: The Postal And Telegraph Operator had a Home Office warrant card as a special constable, which permitted them to carry out searches.) who also acted as a map reader and who had a list of valid and recently-expired licences, sat on the rear passenger seat. An unusual feature of the vehicle was an optical periscope, synchronized with the rotation of the mast, which identified the house from which the signals were detected. At night, this could be used to project a spot of light instead. To avoid the operator needing to move their head with the periscope, (Note: As with a submarine periscope.) a pair of prisms were used to produce the rotation, with a fixed eyepiece.

The receiver electronics produced a frequency analyser panoramic display on a 5" CRT screen. This display was swept automatically across a range up to 8 MHz. The initial input stage was based on an existing TV 'turret tuner' design, (Note: A 'turret tuner' was a common design of the day for VHF TV tuning. A mechanical drum with a large handwheel rotated the 14 duplicated pre-tuned input filters and switched them into circuit, one-by-one.) with manual selection across 14 bands spanning 110–250 MHz. As the number of broadcast channels in use locally was very small, (Note: On the border between two network areas, a TV of this period might, at most, be receiving four channels.) only a couple of the mechanically-switched bands would be needed for each detection search. The receiver circuit was a triple superheterodyne, with the second IF frequency being swept between 60 and 70 MHz, in synchronism with the CRT horizontal scan. The IF oscillator was controlled by the sweep signal through a form of transductor circuit, where a control winding controlled the reluctance of the inductor controlling the oscillator frequency. This sweep range was controllable by the operator and could be reduced to zero, making the receiver a simple receiver with an output to headphones.

=== UHF ===
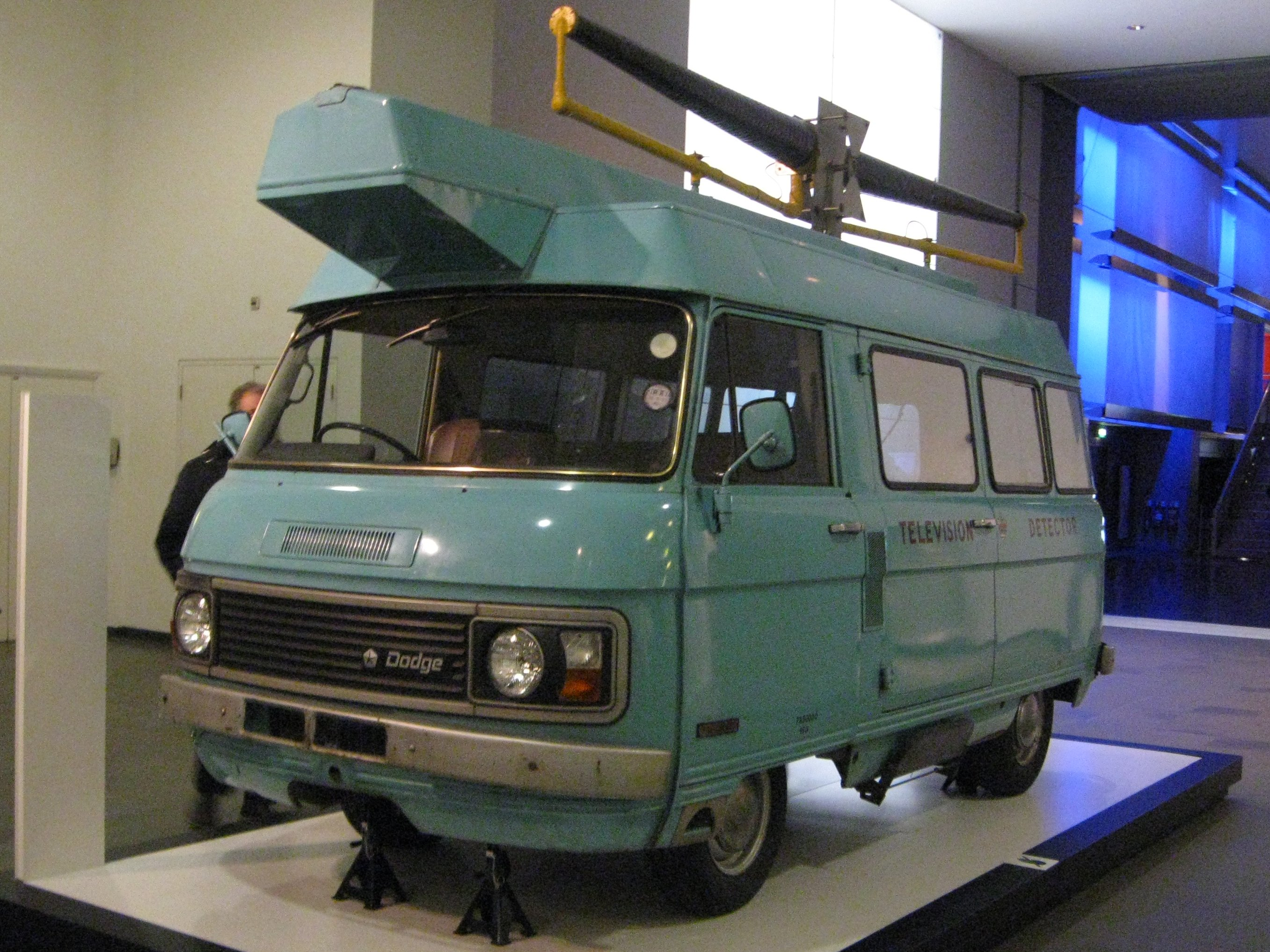
1982 Dodge SpaceVan equipped as UHF detector van. Displayed at Science Museum, London. (As of January 2015)

The introduction of UHF 625-line TV to the UK, and the possibility of colour TV, used Bands IV and V and required a new generation of detector vans. A new, more expensive, colour licence was also introduced and an increase in licence evasion was anticipated, as licences were not upgraded for new colour sets.

Once again, by detecting only the upper range of the frequency band, the upper fundamentals and the harmonics of the lower bands could both be detected with the same equipment, without requiring an impractically broad frequency range for the detector receiver. Two new problems needed to be addressed for detection of the new sets: firstly the emissions were both higher in frequency and lower in signal strength than before. Secondly, the propagation of signals at this wavelength and their tendency for confusing reflections from many nearby surfaces meant that the previous triangulation method from a couple of positions was no longer reliable. A method was needed which could replace triangulation by a more immediate form of location.

A suitable broadband aerial for the frequency range of 470–860 MHz was a log-periodic spiral, wound on a six-foot long conical former. This had a directionality of 40° for a beam width at half maximum power. (Note: This is a typical measure for the directionality of an aerial. At 20° off-axis, the power detected would be half that from the same source on-axis.) To give a narrower directionality, two of these aerials were mounted together in parallel, and spaced apart by 6λ, or six wavelengths at the detected frequency. The aerials pointed sideways in operation, and could be turned lengthwise for driving to the search site. As the necessary spacing varied with frequency, the forward aerial moved backwards and forwards automatically, with tuning. At low frequencies, the large spacing needed required an extension of the van's roof forwards in a prominent box. Waterproofing was provided by a greased neoprene flap, closed by a zipper when not in use. A common misunderstanding was that the aerials moved in a scanning pattern when searching, as the VHF detectors had, but in fact they remained static.

The receiver beam pattern of the two aerial system was still approximately 40° across, but this was now divided into seven sharply defined lobes, with a central lobe only about 4° across. The motion of the vehicle driving slowly was used as the scanning mechanism and a rotation sensor on the speedometer drive provided the X-axis scanning signal for the display. A manual pushbutton was pressed as each house boundary was passed. The ideal detection display was thus a series of seven peaks, centred on the position between the two house markers for the target house. Two CRTs were used for display, one by the operator and the other for providing a photographic record. A Polaroid 'instant' camera was used, so that the print could be produced at the time, before confronting the homeowner.

The initial search for the presence of a TV, rather than accurately locating its position, was done with a separate aerial pair. These were a simple pair of dipoles, one on either side of a shared reflector plate, and comparing signal strength from each side. Later detector vans, such as the Leyland illustrated, used a development of that technique with paired aerials, making a mechanically much simpler aerial system.

The completed system was the most visually well-recognised of all the TV detector vans, particularly as their success and the expanded enforcement campaign with the growth of colour TV made them the most numerous. The system was mounted in a Commer PB van, as was becoming the standard GPO Telephones van, although extensively modified to carry the aerials. They also had an automatic gearbox, to ease the task of driving slowly down urban streets.

=== Flat-screen TVs ===
A 2013 study was conducted on television emissions detection by Markus G. Kuhn. This found that emissions from modern sets were still detectable, but that it was increasingly difficult to relate these to the received signal, and thus to correlate a set's emissions with a particular licensed broadcast. The sets radiated from a number of sources, particularly the display controller and its low-voltage differential signaling link to the LCD panel.

Modern sets follow a consistent internal structure of a separate front-end video processor and a display controller, each highly integrated to a single IC. They are supplied by some form of analogue tuner, according to local broadcast standards. The video processor converts an analogue signal to a consistent digital signal standard, such as ITU-656. The display controller then maps this signal to the particular screen panel fitted, its pixel dimensions, such as the 1440×900 WXGA+ standard, which is entirely separate from the broadcast size standards, such as 720×576. The display controller also maps aspect ratios such as 4:3 and 16:9.

Difficulty in identifying emanations from a set is for a number of reasons. Firstly the emissions are simply lower, owing to modern standards for EMI and the increasingly enforced compliance with EMC standards. Signals within the video processor IC would be an obvious target for recognition, in a similar manner to older detectors, but these are far too low to be measurable outside. Secondly the available signals are now divorced from the broadcast signal. The LVDS link to the LCD panel provides receivable signals, but these are dependent on the configuration of the panel as much as on the broadcast being received, and are hard to reconstruct so as to be recognisable.

In the crudest manners, a discernible video signal can be recognised, but this would be hard to tie to a specific broadcast, or to an evidentiary standard. A simple optical detector may be able to achieve just as much, and from a simpler circuit. There is some suggestion that this method is now in use.

== Operation ==
Some information regarding TV detection technology was revealed as part of a freedom of information request made to the BBC in 2013, which included details of a search warrant. The warrant revealed that a BBC contractor had used an "optical detector" to reveal the possible presence of a TV. The warrant stated that: "the optical detector in the detector van uses a large lens to collect that light and focus it on to an especially sensitive device, which converts fluctuating light signals into electrical signals, which can be electronically analysed. If a receiver is being used to watch broadcast programmes then a positive reading is returned." The BBC stated that this was strong evidence that a set was "receiving a possible broadcast".

According to the Comptroller and Auditor General of the National Audit Office, "where the BBC still suspects that an occupier is watching live television but not paying for a licence, it can send a detection van to check whether this is the case. TVL detection vans can identify viewing on a non-TV device in the same way that they can detect viewing on a television set. BBC staff were able to demonstrate this to my staff in controlled conditions sufficient for us to be confident that they could detect viewing on a range of non-TV devices."

In July 2019, an article in the Oxford Mail recalled a two-week period from June 1960 when an olive-green TV detector van—one of a fleet of nine owned by the BBC—toured the city to investigate 500 addresses with no record of a television licence. The van contained a team of three people, "including a radio expert and a local Post Office official", and was equipped with a number of aerials that could be adjusted to pinpoint a signal being given off by a television at a specific address. The article quoted Ron Smith, who was in charge of the operation, and explained the process: "When a TV set is switched on it gives out a radio signal. The detector van then used its adapted radio receiver which is tuned to the wavelength of the signal and then converts it to a whistle transmitted through the technical officer's headphones." The team were authorised to ask residents to produce their TV licence and to note down their details if they couldn't.

== In popular culture ==
- The "Fish Licence" sketch on Monty Python's Flying Circus, aired in 1970, mentions a "cat detector van", a parody of the TV detector van.
- The 9 February 1976 episode of Coronation Street featured a TV detector van arriving in Weatherfield and a TV enforcement agent visiting multiple unlicenced characters' homes and fining Annie Walker for having an out of date TV licence.
- In The Young Ones episode 4, "Bomb", the boys are visited by a TV detector van worker, who questions Neil as to whether they have a TV. When Neil tries to evade the question, the representative shouts: "We know you've got one, we detected it".

== See also ==
- Television licensing in the United Kingdom
- Operation RAFTER, a MI5 counterintelligence programme to detect radios used by spies
- National Radio Quiet Zone, an area of the US where electromagnetic signals are restricted and authorities use similar detector vans to locate radios
