= Television licensing in the United Kingdom =

Annual licence to receive live television

In the United Kingdom and the rest of the British Islands, any household watching or recording television transmissions at the same time they are being broadcast is required to hold a television licence. This applies regardless of transmission method, including terrestrial, satellite, cable, and internet streaming. It is also required for the viewing of on demand content on BBC iPlayer. The television licence is the instrument used to raise revenue to fund the BBC and S4C.

Businesses, hospitals, schools and a range of other organisations are also required by law to hold television licences to watch and record live television broadcasts. The licence, originally a radio licence, was introduced in November 1923 using powers under the Wireless Telegraphy Act 1904, and cost 10 shillings per annum. The licence was extended to televisions at a cost of £2 in June 1946. The radio part was abolished in February 1971.

In May 2016, the government's white paper announced that the licence fee would rise with inflation for the first five years of the Charter period, from 1 April 2017.

The number of licences issued peaked at 26.2 million in 2018, and has declined every year since. In March 2024, there were 23.9 million licences, of which 3,600 (0.015%) were monochrome (black and white). In 2000, 212,000 homes in the UK had monochrome TV licences, but by 2019, this had declined significantly to 6,586 licences. In 2025, this figure had decreased further, to 3,600 black and white TV licences. In March 2026 there were 23.3 million licences.

Since 1 April 2026, the annual cost has been £180 for a colour licence and £60.50 for a black and white licence (with a 50% discount for legally blind people). Income from the licence is primarily used to fund the television, radio and online services of the BBC. The total income from licence fees was £3.83 billion in 2017–18, of which £655.3 million or 17.1% was provided by the UK Government through concessions for those over the age of 75 (this subsidy has now been phased out). Thus, the licence fee made up the bulk (75.7%) of the BBC's total income of £5.0627 billion in 2017–18.

== Operation of the licensing system ==
=== Licence fee collection and use ===
The television licence fee is collected by the BBC and primarily used to fund the radio, television and online services of the BBC itself. Licence fee collection is the responsibility of the BBC's Finance and Business division.

The BBC also operates as the TV Licensing Authority in the UK, as one of its trade names.

Although the money is raised for its own use and collected by the BBC itself, the BBC does not directly use the collected fees. The money received is first paid into the government's Consolidated Fund. It is subsequently included in the 'vote' for the Department for Culture, Media and Sport in that year's Appropriation Act, and passed back to the BBC for the running of the BBC's own services (free from commercial advertisements). The money also finances programming for S4C and the BBC World Service, and included the running costs of BBC Monitoring at Caversham until it was relocated to London and the property sold in May 2018.

=== Legal framework ===
In 1991, the BBC assumed the role of television licensing authority with responsibility for the collection and enforcement of the licence fee.

The BBC is authorised by the Communications Act 2003 to collect and enforce the television licence fee. Section 363 of the Act makes it against the law to install or use a television receiver to watch or record any television programmes as they are being broadcast without a television licence. Section 365 of the same Act requires the payment of the television licence fee to the BBC.

The licence fee is formally set by the Secretary of State for Culture, Media and Sport by the use of statutory instruments. The relevant statutory instruments are the Communications (Television Licensing) Regulations 2004 and amendments since that time such as the Communications (Television Licensing) (Amendment) Regulations 2010. As well as prescribing the fees, the regulations also define "television receiver" for the purposes of the law.

For people living in the Channel Islands and Isle of Man, the television licensing law is extended to their areas by Orders in Council made by agreement with their own governments.

As part of its enforcement regime, the BBC is authorised to carry out surveillance using powers defined by the Regulation of Investigatory Powers Act 2000 and the Regulation of Investigatory Powers (British Broadcasting Corporation) Order 2001. The BBC is permitted by the order to use surveillance equipment to detect unlicensed use of television receivers.

As the public body responsible for issuing television licences, licensing information held by the BBC (and held on the BBC's behalf by television licensing contractors) is subject to the Freedom of Information Act 2000. The BBC withholds some information on licence enforcement using exemptions under the Act; in particular, under section 31, which permits the withholding of information on crime prevention grounds and under section 43(2), which allows the BBC to retain information judged commercially sensitive.

=== Reclassification as a tax ===
In January 2006, the Office for National Statistics (ONS) changed the classification of the licence fee from a service charge to a tax. Explaining the change, the ONS said: "in line with the definition of a tax, the licence fee is a compulsory payment which is not paid solely for access to BBC services. A licence is required to receive ITV, Channel 4, Channel 5, satellite, or cable". A briefing paper from the House of Commons Library described the licence fee as a hypothecated tax (i.e. one raised for a particular defined purpose).

=== TV Licensing Management Team ===
The TV Licence Management Team, which is part of the Finance and Business division of the BBC, oversees the television licensing system. The TV Licence Management Team is based in the BBC buildings at White City Place in London. The majority of television licensing administration and enforcement activities are carried out under contract by private companies. The TV Licence Management Team oversees the performance of the contractors.

=== TV Licensing brand ===
The BBC pursues its licence fee collection and enforcement under the trading name TV Licensing, but contracts much of the task to commercial organisations. TV Licensing is a trademark of the BBC used under licence by companies contracted by the BBC that administer the television licensing system. Concerning the relationship of the BBC brand with the TV Licensing brand, the BBC's position is stated as: "The TV Licensing brand is separate from the BBC brand. No link between the two brands should be made in customer facing communications, in particular, use of the BBC name and logo". However, it also states that the rules for internal communications and communications with suppliers are different: "the name BBC TV Licensing may also be used within department names or job titles for BBC employees".

=== Television Licensing contractors and subcontractors ===
==== Capita ====
A major contractor is Capita. Capita is responsible for the administration and enforcement of the television licence fee.

It is expected that Capita will earn between £1.10bn and £1.55bn from its contract with the BBC if it runs its maximum 15 years from July 2012.

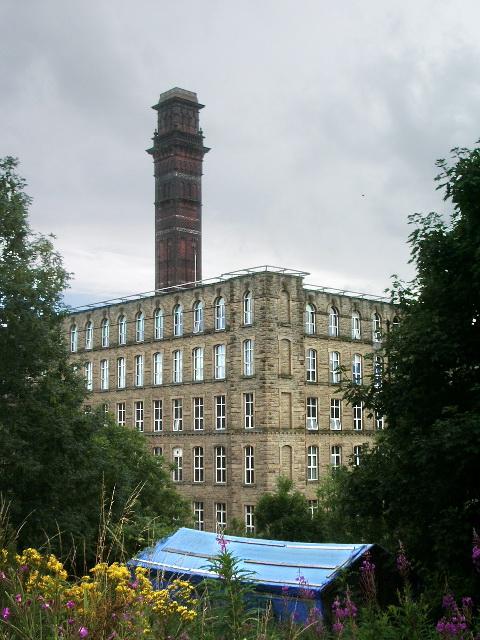
Capita's TV Licensing Headquarters is based at India Mill, Darwen, Lancashire.

The services carried out by Capita on behalf of the BBC include dealing with television licence queries, processing television licence applications and payments and the maintenance of the licence database. Enforcement tasks include visiting addresses, identifying people watching TV without a licence, taking statements and achieving prosecutions of television licence evaders. TV Licensing debt collection is carried out by Akinika, which is a debt collection agency owned by Capita.

Capita's TV Licensing headquarters is at India Mill, in Darwen, Lancashire. Capita employs a number of subcontractors for part of its TV Licensing operations – one important one being Computer Sciences Corporation which provides and modernises the required IT infrastructure. Since 2004, Capita has undertaken a proportion of television licensing administration at locations outside of the UK and "has progressively increased the amount of work processed overseas each year". However, as of 2013, Capita has not set up any overseas call centres to carry out television licensing work and it would need the BBC's permission to do so in the future. Some of Capita's television licensing work is carried out in Mumbai, India but after reportage in Panorama about scammers from India, the Indian office of Capita was closed permanently.

==== Proximity London Limited ====
Marketing and printing services, including reminder letters and licence distribution, are carried out by Proximity London Limited.

==== Havas Media ====
Media services are contracted to Havas Media.

==== Other contractors ====
Other contractors involved in television licensing include PayPoint which provides over-the-counter services in the UK, and the post offices which provide the same services in the Isle of Man and Channel Islands. Also involved are: AMV BBDO which provides advertising services, and Fishburn Communications which carries out public relations.

=== Duration of a television licence ===
A television licence, once issued, is normally valid for a maximum of 12 months. The period of its validity depends on the exact day of the month it is purchased; this is because television licences always expire at the end of a calendar month. If a licence were to be obtained in September 2014, for example, it would expire on 31 August 2015. Thus the period of validity would vary between 11 and 12 months depending on how early in the month it was bought. If an existing licence is renewed on time, the new licence will last the full 12 months.

The BBC sometimes issues 'short dated' licences in situations when a licence is renewed after the expiry date of the previous licence. The BBC does this as it assumes that television was being watched in the interim period between expiry and renewal. Short dated licences are set to expire 12 months after the previous expiry date.

If a television licence is no longer needed for an address, it is possible to cancel a licence and apply for a partial refund. The amount refunded will depend on the time left to the expiry date. Normally only full quarters (that is three consecutive calendar months) of unexpired licence period are refunded.

The BBC may also revoke a licence under certain circumstances.

=== Cost of a licence ===
The level of the fee is decided following periodic negotiations between the UK Government and the BBC. Before 1988, increases in the licence fee happened at irregular intervals, sometimes a few years passing between changes. From 1988 to 2010, the licence fee was increased annually each April. The licence fee remained constant at £145.50 per year between April 2010 and April 2017, when it subsequently rose to £147. The fee was due to increase in line with inflation for five years until 2021/22, however, it was kept at £159 from 2021 until 1 April 2024 when it rose to £169.50.

In June 2019, it was announced that free television licences for all over-75s that were funded by the Government as part of the 2017 agreement, would be abolished in June 2020. The TV Licensing website stated that "From 1 June 2020, there will be a new scheme. Under the new scheme, anyone aged 75 or over who receives Pension Credit will still be eligible for a free TV Licence which the BBC will pay for. Households where there is no one aged 75 or over that receives Pension Credit will need to buy a licence if one is needed." This was delayed to 1 August 2020, in part due to the COVID-19 pandemic.

During the 2019 general election campaign, then Prime Minister Boris Johnson said the government would consider decriminalising non-payment of the television licence, a move which the BBC warned could cost it £200 million a year.

As of 1 April 2026, it costs £180.00 for a colour licence and £60.50 for a black and white television licence.

=== Payment methods ===
The BBC allows the following forms of payment of the licence fee:

- Direct debit. Payments may be made annually, quarterly or monthly.
- Debit or credit card. Annual payment.
- PayPoint. Annual payments may be made at PayPoint outlets (usually situated in shops) by cash or debit card.
- TV Licensing payment card. Holders of this card will have a payment plan showing when and how much they need to pay. Payments may be made weekly or monthly at PayPoint outlets. Payments may also be made online, by phone or by text message (with credit or debit card).
- TV Licensing savings card. This is a way for a licence fee holder to save for a subsequent licence. If enough money for the new licence is saved up, a new licence is sent automatically. Otherwise the balance has to be paid for.
- Cheque and postal orders. Annual payments may be made by post by these methods.
- BACS electronic transfer. Annual payments for renewal licences only.

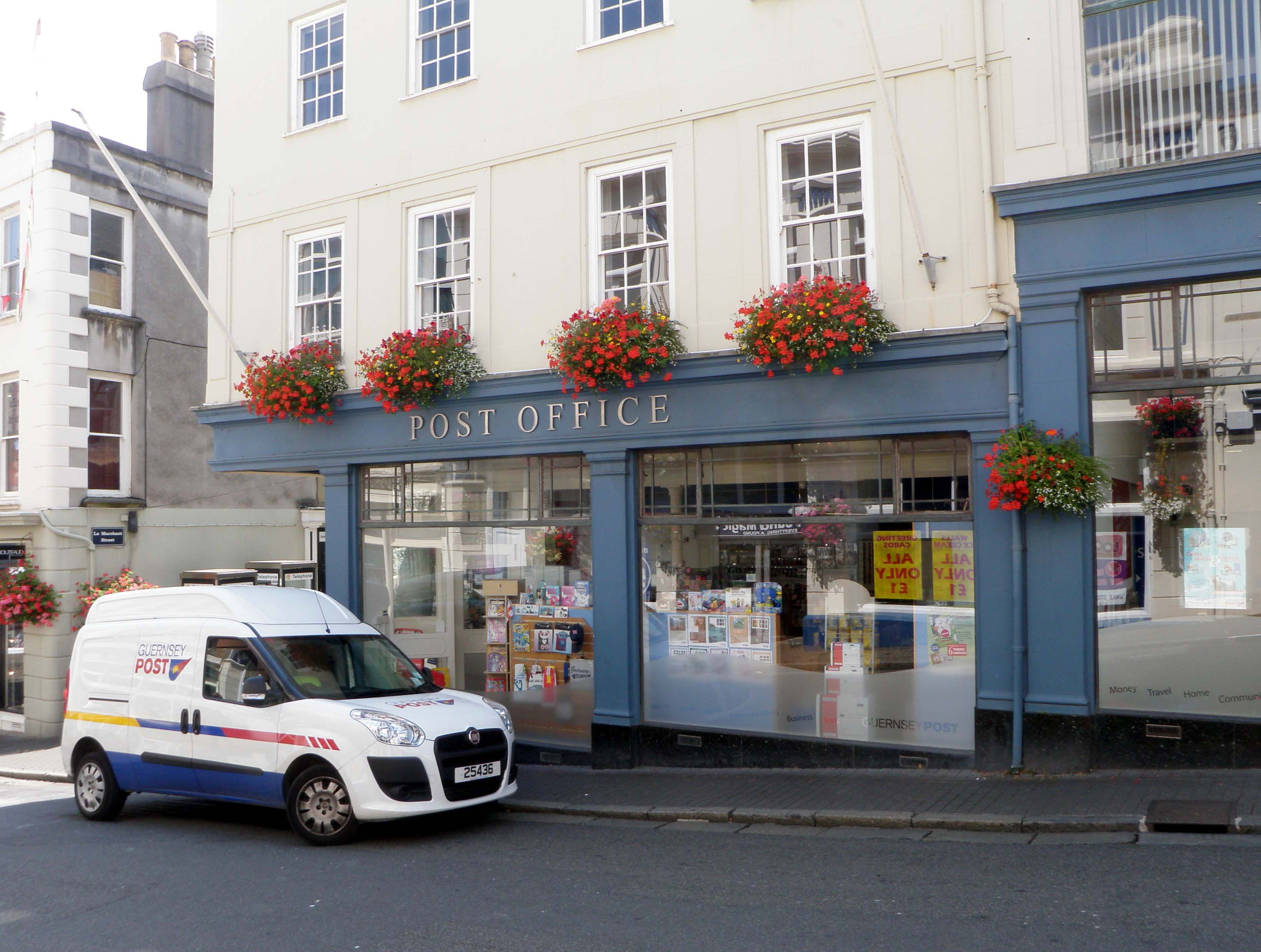
A post office in Guernsey. Unlike in the UK, television licences may still be purchased at post offices in Guernsey, Jersey and the Isle of Man.

The payment methods mean that the licence fee is paid for either completely or partially in advance. Annual payments require complete payment in advance. For monthly direct debit, a new licence is paid off in 6 monthly instalments of just over £24 a month. Renewal licences are paid for in 12 monthly instalments starting 6 months before expiry of the licence in force i.e. starting 6 months before the renewal date. Quarterly payments made using direct debit carry an additional cost of £5.00 per year, or £1.25 a quarter, which is included in the licence fee total. This addition is described as "a small charge" in the generic letter issued by TV Licensing to those paying by direct debit, and on the TV Licensing website it is justified with: "By paying quarterly the majority of your licence is paid for as you use it. This differs from our other instalment schemes, where at least half of the licence fee is collected in advance. As a result, quarterly payments incur a small premium of £1.25 per quarter which is included in your payment."

In the Channel Islands and the Isle of Man, over the counter services are provided by the Post Office rather than by PayPoint outlets.

=== Concessions ===
==== Over 75s ====
Between November 2000 and April 2018, TV licences were provided to people over the age of 75, through full funding by central government. This concession covered the whole household, so that even if just one member of the household was over 75, then a free television licence could be applied for to cover all the residents. Following a 2016 funding agreement between the Conservative government and the BBC, this funding was phased out between April 2018 and April 2020, after which time no further government funding was available for the scheme: Free television licences based solely on age ended in August 2020 (previously planned to be June 2020 but extended as of the Coronavirus pandemic). It has been estimated that if full funding had been maintained, it would have contributed £745m to the BBC's 2020–21 budget. The BBC held a public consultation in November 2018 to decide whether the concession to the over-75s should continue after 2020 and, if so, in what form. The response to the BBC's questionnaire, 48% were in favour of retaining the existing concessionary system, 37% preferred reforming the concession and 17% preferred the option of abolition of the concession.

The BBC discontinued the full concession, but continued to offer free licences on a means-tested basis; from August 2020, most over 75s were required to pay the full licence fee, but households where one person receives a pension credit benefit will continue to be eligible for a free licence.

==== Crown dependencies ====
On the Isle of Man, a free television licence scheme was funded by the Isle of Man Department of Social Care. The BBC maintained the free licence scheme for all over 75s until 31 December 2020. From 1 January 2021, this was replaced by a scheme whereby the BBC funds free television licences for the 500 over 75s in receipt of Income Support and the Isle of Man Government is funding free television licences for 2021 for the remaining 4,500 at a cost of around £800,000.

There are schemes for elderly residents of the Channel Islands, but they vary in detail and eligibility.

- Residents of Guernsey and Alderney who are over 75 and are in receipt of Income Support are entitled to a free television licence funded by the BBC, whereas those under 75 but over pensionable age have a free licence funded by the States of Guernsey. Residents of Sark who are over the age of 75 are entitled to a free TV licence if they are receiving financial support from the Procureur des Pauvres.
- In Jersey, concessionary licences continue to be available on a means-tested basis under the Social Security (Television Licence Benefit) (Jersey) Regulations 2011, but are now funded by the BBC rather than the Government of Jersey.

==== Blind or severely sight impaired concessions ====
Licences are half price for the legally blind. To qualify for the concession, a blind or severely sight-impaired person must apply to the TV Licensing Blind Concession Group with proof of impairment, either a copy of the document of blind registration or a certificate from an ophthalmologist. The concessionary television licence covers television use by the whole household.

==== Residential care homes ====
Those aged over 60 and in residential care homes (including nursing homes, public-sector sheltered housing and almshouses) qualify for Accommodation for Residential Care (ARC) licences for £7.50 a year.

=== Total licence sales ===
Television licence sales figures were quoted by the BBC to be 25.562 million in the year 2014–15, including 4.502 million concessionary licences for the over 75s, which were paid for by the UK government. The equivalent figures for the year 2013–14 were 25.478 million total licences including 4.328 million licences for the over 75s. In 2014–15, the BBC estimated that there were 26.916 million licensable properties in the UK (defined as premises where live television was being watched), indicating that if the BBC estimates are correct, around 95% of properties are correctly licensed. The total income generated from licence fees was £3.8302 billion in 2017–18.

The vast majority of television licences are for colour television. For example, there were 10,461 black and white television licences in force on 31 August 2014, compared to 25,460,801 colour television licences. The BBC has also stated that during the financial year 2013–14, a total of 41,483 blind concessionary (half-price) licences were issued in the UK of which 29 were blind concessionary black and white licences.

==== Channel Islands ====
In January 2012, there were 36,261 colour licences in force in Jersey as compared to 77,480 addresses (residential properties, businesses and other premises) on the TV Licensing database for the island (at the end of December 2011). This would suggest around 53% of Jersey addresses did not have a television licence at the beginning of 2012.

The comparable figures for Guernsey are 23,673 licences in force in January 2012 and 40,263 addresses on the database at the end of December 2011. Thus there were around 41% unlicensed properties in Guernsey at the beginning of 2012.

== History ==
TV Licence 1946–2016 at 2015 prices

When television broadcasts in the UK were resumed after a break due to the Second World War, it was decided to introduce a television licence fee to fund the service. When first introduced on 1 June 1946, the licence covering the monochrome-only single-channel BBC television service cost £2 (equivalent to £72.42 as of 2025). The licence was originally issued by the General Post Office (GPO), which was then the regulator of public communications within the UK. The GPO also issued licences for home radio receivers powered by mains electricity as well as non removable vehicle mounted radios and was mandated by laws beginning with the Wireless Telegraphy Act 1904, to administer the licensing system; however, the television licence also covered radio reception.

The BBC started regular colour television broadcasts in the summer of 1967. On 1 January 1968, a "colour supplement" of £5 was added to the existing £5 monochrome licence fee; the £10 colour fee was the equivalent of £152.94 in 2025. On 1 April 2019 it rose to £154.50 for colour television and £52 for monochrome television. The radio-only licence was abolished on 1 February 1971, when it was £1–5s–0d (£1.25 in decimal UK currency) or the equivalent of £19.12 at 2025 prices.

On 1 April 1991, the BBC took over the administration of television licensing in the UK, assuming the responsibility of licence fee collection and enforcement. Since this date, the BBC has been the statutory authority for issuing television licences (before April 1991, the statutory authority was the UK Home Office), although the UK Government retains certain powers and responsibilities with regards to television licences.

In July 2002, the BBC awarded Capita the contract to manage the television licensing system, replacing the Post Office (which had been renamed "Consignia" at this time).

In January 2006, the Office of National Statistics classified the licence fee as a tax; previously it had been classified as a service charge. This was reversed in the 2016 charter renewal.

From 2000-09, the number of licences rose from 22.8 million to 24.9 million.

== Licence fee expenditure ==
The BBC Trust gave the following information for expenditure of licence fee income during the year 2009–10 of £3.56 billion (expressed here in percentage terms):

- 66% – All television
- 17% – National and local radio
- 6% – Online e.g. BBC websites, iPlayer
- 11% – Other e.g. transmission and licence fee collection costs (Note: During 2007–2008, the BBC stated that 3.6% of the licence fee was spent on collection.)

Since April 2014, the BBC World Service on radio and BBC Arabic Television have been funded from the licence fee. Prior to this date they were funded by a grant from the government's Foreign and Commonwealth Office. The World Service cost the BBC £268 million in the 2017–18 financial year.

The BBC also paid in 2017–18 contributions to: broadband rollout (£80 million); partial funding of the Welsh channel (£74.8 million), S4C (which is also funded by the Department for Culture, Media and Sport); and a contribution towards the costs of local television (£4.7 million).

BBC World News and the BBC's other international television channels are operated commercially and will continue to not receive licence fee money. The revenues they generate supplement the licence fee in financing British services.

In addition, the BBC Alba Gaelic-language television service is predominantly funded by MG Alba, an organisation funded by the Scottish Government.

== Television licence legal requirements ==
=== When a licence is required ===
According to section 363 of the Communications Act 2003, a television licence must be obtained for any device that is "installed or used" for "receiving a television programme at the same time (or virtually the same time) as it is received by members of the public".

According to TV Licensing, "You need a TV Licence to use any television receiving equipment such as a TV set, digital box, DVD or video recorder, PC, laptop or mobile phone to watch or record television programmes as they're being shown on TV". Portable televisions and similar equipment such as laptops and mobile phones powered by internal batteries are covered for use anywhere under a licence held for their owner's residence.

On 1 September 2016 the conditions under which a television licence is required changed to include receiving video on demand programme services provided by the BBC, on the iPlayer catch-up service. This was made possible by The Communications (Television Licensing) (Amendment) Regulations 2016.

However, there are a few exceptional cases when live television may be watched without a licence.

=== When a licence is not required ===
It is not necessary to have a television licence for the purpose of:

- Operating a digital box used with a hi-fi system or another device that can only be used to produce sounds
- Installing and using a television set solely as a closed-circuit TV monitor
- Using a television to play pre-recorded DVDs or videos (although to record live programmes it is necessary to hold a licence)
- Using a television as a digital radio receiver
- Using a digital box to listen to radio through a TV
- Using a television as a monitor for a computer or games console
- Watching catch up TV services when the programme is not live except when using BBC iPlayer service to receive BBC channel catch-up programmes
- Watching S4C catch-up programmes on BBC iPlayer
- Listening to BBC radio programmes over the Internet via BBC Sounds

A (free) licence is required for non-exempt premises even when no fee is payable, e.g. premises with residents over 75.

A recorded programme watched on unlicensed equipment is outside the scope of the Communications (Television Licensing) Regulations 2004, because it is not "received at the same time (or virtually the same time) as it is received by members of the public," although such recordings may infringe copyright.

TV Licensing offers the following advice to those who have a television but 'who wish to make it clear that they do not need a licence':

- Remove the television from the aerial.
- Cover the aerial socket so that it can't be used.
- Ensure that when channels on the television are selected no television signal is received.

However, TV Licensing also says that it is not compulsory to follow this advice. To listen to digital radio on a television, for example, it would be necessary to attach the television to an aerial and tune the television to different channels. The BBC has made it clear that it is legal to listen to digital radio using a television without holding a television licence.

According to Ofcom, television transmissions over the Internet are a grey area which in future might make fees based on television possession redundant. In 2005, a Green Paper by the Department for Culture, Media and Sport included suggestions of "either a compulsory levy on all households or even on ownership of PCs as well as TVs". However, TV Licensing later stated that use of any device (including a computer or mobile phone) receiving transmissions at or about the same time as they appear on television requires a licence. The BBC is aware that new technology represents a threat to its revenue. A 2012 BBC report stated "there is a continued threat to the growth in television licence sales from the increasing number of people consuming television in a way that does not need to be licensed".

Televisions receiving a transmission from outside the British Islands (e.g. broadcast from Germany, Italy, Greece, Turkey and the Netherlands via the Astra satellite, on which many channels are free-to-air) did not need a licence until the Communications Act 2003, which required a television licence for the reception of television from any source.

In 2012, more than 400,000 households informed the BBC that they did not need a television licence. According to the BBC, the average number of addresses in the UK with a No Licence Needed (NLN) status in the 2013 calendar year was 1,879,877. In June 2013, 5,043 NLN declarations were made to the BBC on the grounds that the address was only watching catch up television.

Use of digital set-top boxes, video recorders and television licensing requirements according to the BBC
Equipment in use	Can television programmes be recorded?	What is it used with?	Licence required
Digital box	No	Colour television	Colour
Digital box	No	Black and White television	Mono
Digital box	All boxes	External sound receiver or radio only through television	No licence required
Digital box or personal video recorder (PVR)	Yes	Colour or black and white television	Colour
VCR – standalone, has an analogue tuner so cannot record contemporary digital television	No	Colour or black and white TV	No licence required

=== Exceptions to the television licensing regime ===
There are a few exceptions to the television licensing regime where live television may be watched without a television licence being held for that property. These cases are:

- Crown immunity. According to the BBC: "neither the Communications Act 2003 nor the Communications (Television Licensing) Regulations 2004 bind the Crown. Thus, the Crown is not subject to the TV Licensing regime." Prison authorities can assert Crown immunity to allow prisoners to watch TV without a TV licence. In 2012, the BBC recognised that the UK Parliament is exempt from the television licensing regime, and so the Parliamentary Estate stopped purchasing television licences from this date.
- Events of national importance. The BBC can grant a dispensation for the temporary use of television sets away from the licensed address in what it calls 'exceptional circumstances'. One example of this was the screening of the Queen's Diamond Jubilee celebrations in 2012. There are well defined criteria for when this exception is valid.
- Foreign ships. According to the BBC: 'Foreign Ships will not need a licence'

=== Number of licences required per address ===
A licence is required to watch live television transmissions anywhere, including residential and business premises.

For residential premises, only one licence is required per household per address, regardless of the number of licensed devices or the number of members of the household. However, the licence itself is always held in the name of an individual.

A rented property in multiple occupation by a joint tenancy agreement is considered by TV Licensing as one household and requires only one licence, but a rented property with multiple, separate tenancy agreements is not considered a single household and each tenant may require a separate licence. For example, a house in multiple occupation may have private bedrooms and shared communal areas: if five occupants share such a property with individual tenancy agreements then they may require up to five television licences if each private room contains a television receiver, while a similar property housing five occupants under a joint tenancy agreement may require only one television licence.

=== Television use away from home ===
Use of television in a static caravan is covered by the licence held for the user's main address, provided there is no simultaneous use of television at both places, and the use of television in a touring caravan is always covered by the user's main home licence. The use of a device to watch television (including a laptop or mobile phone), which is powered solely by its own internal batteries is covered for any address by the user's main home licence, but requires a separate licence if it is plugged into the mains or other external power source, such as a car battery.

Students during term-time may not need a separate television licence if one is held at their permanent home-address if they watch television on a device powered solely by its own internal batteries. Specifically:

- The out-of-term address must be covered by a television licence
- Any television receiving equipment used must be powered solely by its own internal batteries
- The television equipment must not be connected to an aerial or plugged into the mains.

People living exclusively in a mobile dwelling such as a touring caravan or a constantly cruising canal boat, who do not have a static address, are not legally able to watch a television as they cannot purchase a licence without one.

== Licence fee enforcement ==
=== Television licence evaders ===
A person who watches or records live television without being in possession of a television licence is referred to by the BBC as a 'TV licence evader'. Each year the BBC estimates the evasion rate (expressed as a percentage of total 'licensable properties') and publishes the value in its Annual Report and Accounts.

The basic formula for estimating the evasion rate is:

$$1-\frac{L}{{{(Ho)}{(PR)}+{NDL}}}$$

where:

L: number of television Licences in force

Ho: number of domestic households

PR: penetration rate of televisions into households

NDL: non-domestic licences required

The figure for the number of licences in force is taken from the BBC's database. The other variables used to calculate the evasion rates are estimates. The data for the number of domestic households is taken from the Department of Communities and Local Government figures. The Broadcasters' Audience Research Board survey is used to estimate the rate of penetration of television sets into domestic households. Non-domestic licences include licences required for students, military accommodation, hotels and businesses. Various sources are used to estimate this figure.

The most recent published figures for 2018–19 state that the evasion rate is between 6 and 7%. For the year 2005–6, TV Licensing reported that they "reduced estimated evasion to a record low of 4.7%". However, this figure rose during the following year to 5.1% and remained at 5.1% during 2007–8. For the year 2010–2011 the evasion rate is stated as 5.2%. According to the BBC "the published rate of evasion has increased marginally to 5.5% in 2012/13". The evasion rate is far from uniform across the UK, with Scotland having a far higher rate than the UK as a whole. One reason given by the BBC for evasion is lack of money in a household. For example, in the BBC Full Financial Statement 2012–13 the BBC says: 'as household budgets come under pressure, we are starting to see an increase in licence fee evasion rates over their prior year level'. However, this is not the only reason given for TV licence evasion, since according to a submission made by the BBC to the Information Commissioner's Office: 'the BBC said that it is also aware that a growing number of individuals deliberately evade the licence fee due to dissatisfaction with the BBC'.

According to a National Audit Office report from 2002: "Areas with high evasion rates are most likely to have, for example, a higher than average proportion of younger people, low income households, and students and single parent families, and a level of County Court judgments 50 per cent above the national average". However, according to the BBC, 'evasion is spread across all socioeconomic groups'. The BBC has also claimed that the 'TV Licensing evader profile' could be characterised by the distribution by social grade of 1.3m properties that were not licensed on 31 March 2007. The profile was given as follows: AB 20.1%, C1 29.1%, C2 13.6%, D 18.9%, E 18.3%.

The Broadcasters' Audience Research Board estimated that of June 2004, 2.3% of UK households do not have television, and in September 2008, the BBC reported that some one million people do not need a television licence. Alleged excuses given by householders for not having a licence include loss of mail, being "too busy" and suffering from polymorphous light eruption (sun allergy). The results of market research carried out on self-identified evaders concluded that roughly half were 'opportunistic delayers' who were playing the system to avoid immediate payment and that the others were 'deliberate evaders' who were trying to 'cheat the system'. Nearly one fifth of respondents claimed never to have bought a television licence. In compiling these figures however, no reference is made to the number of people who do not require a licence and who have not voluntarily replied to invitations to declare this. Instead, it is assumed they are also counted as 'evaders', despite lack of any evidence of wrongdoing on their part.

=== LASSY database ===
Since it is not possible to prevent a person buying and using television receiving equipment, the television licence system is enforced by first identifying television licence evaders and then attempting to sell them a licence and in some cases, prosecuting them. The critical method of detecting television licence evaders is through the use of a database system known as LASSY, which contains 29.5 million addresses. LASSY is an acronym of 'Licence Administration and Support System'. According to the National Audit Office: "The database holds records of potentially licensable properties and basic details (such as the name of the licence holder and the licence expiry date) of those for which valid licences are held". This database is routinely updated with licence holders' details. Until 25 June 2013, dealers in television receiving equipment were required by law to provide TV Licensing with identifying information about everyone who buys or rents such equipment. However this requirement has been lifted by the Enterprise and Regulatory Reform Act 2013. TV Licensing maintains permanent contact with every address in the database that is recorded as not having a TV licence until a licence is purchased for that address or until TV Licensing confirm that the household does not need a licence. If it is confirmed that a household does not watch or record live television, the address is put into the NLCC (No Licence Needed Claim Confirmed) category. Residential properties put into this category are not visited or contacted for a period of two years from the time that the claim was confirmed. Business properties on the other hand, are exempted from visits or mailings for three years after confirmation.

=== TV Licensing letters and telephone calls ===
TV Licensing may make initial contact by letter or by phone with occupants of addresses for which there is no current licence. During the financial year 2012–13, approximately 21.5 million letters were sent to unlicensed addresses. The average postage cost to post one standard TV Licensing letter in the financial year 2012–13 was stated to be £0.2059. The methods by which an occupant can reply are in writing, by telephone or by filling in an online form. If there is no reply to the first letter and a television licence is not bought by the occupant, then TV Licensing continues to write regularly to the address and "the tone of the letters progressively becomes stronger to encourage a reply". For example, one of its standard letters includes the phrase: "Official warning: We have opened an investigation". This warning was included in 940,615 letters sent in January/February 2013. Another standard letter states: 'Dear Sir/Madam, you have not responded to our previous letters. We want to ensure you have the information you may need before a hearing is set at your local court.' More than 3 million letters containing this phrase were sent in 2011.

Three basic tones of voice are used in TV Licensing letters: "Customer Service", "Collections" and "Enforcement". According to the BBC: "Customer service is the brand experience we create for customers who are currently licensed, unknowingly unlicensed or who don't need a licence", whereas "Collections is the brand experience we create for those customers whose television licence has expired and whom TV Licensing wants to motivate to renew." Finally, the enforcement tone is used for households who have been unlicensed for a longer period. This period is not specified in freely available documents but TV Licensing suggests it could be used, for example, for the third and fourth renewal reminder. Each of these 'tones' involves letters with a different colour palette. For example, green is used in 'Customer Service' letters and red may be used in 'Collections' and 'Enforcement' letters. In all cases, the vocabulary and format used in the letters is strictly defined.

If a business or household is not obliged to have a television licence then TV Licensing will request written confirmation of this, though no such information is required to be given in law.

According to the BBC, it is not possible to opt out of receiving TVL mailings since they 'are not advertising or marketing material'. Similarly, householders who do not have a licence cannot exclude themselves from unsolicited calls from TV Licensing by registering with the Telephone Preference Service.

In 2014, a householder invoiced TV Licensing £40 as a 'processing fee' for 'opening, reading and filing' a TV Licensing letter. Because TV Licensing did not pay the charge, the householder took the claim to the County Court, eventually obtaining a default judgment and receiving the fee plus other costs incurred.

In the lead up to Christmas 2024, TV Licensing sent out a letter stating that they would be sending out enforcement staff on Christmas Day.

=== Enquiry officer visits ===
If a colour television licence is not purchased for an address, TV Licensing agents—known as "visiting officers", "enquiry officers" or "enforcement officers"—make unannounced visits to the address. In August 2013, there were reported to be 334 enquiry officers, all employees of the BBC's main enforcement contractor, Capita. Enquiry officers make around four million visits a year to households in the UK and Crown dependencies. Each week an enquiry officer may upload a number of unlicensed addresses onto their "handheld device". The enquiry officer is only allowed to visit the addresses on this list, which are normally within a thirty-minute travelling distance from their home postcode. Enquiry officers do not visit addresses in their own postcode, however.

Although TV Licensing enforces the BBC's statutory obligation to ensure that every address where a television licence is required is correctly licensed, its agents have no special right of access and, like any other member of the public, rely on an implied right of access to reach the front door. A householder may withdraw the implied right of access to TV Licensing personnel by contacting the BBC and informing them that this right has been revoked; the BBC says they respect such requests (although could still seek a warrant to search the property), except in Scotland. As of March 2014, 7,299 households had withdrawn the implied right of access. This figure had increased to over 20,000 by December 2015.

Upon visiting a property, enquiry officers ask a set of predetermined questions to whoever answers the door when they visit. They first try to find out if the person who responds to the enquiry officer is an "appropriate person" to interview (i.e. an adult who lives at the property). They then try to find out if that person has been receiving television without a licence. If they suspect that this is the case, they issue an unofficial (Note: A regular member of the public cannot issue an official caution.) caution to the person that whatever they say may be used against them in court. They then take a prosecution statement and ask the interviewee to sign it. The enquiry officer may ask permission to enter the property and may examine any television receiving equipment found there. According to the visiting procedures: 'circumstantial evidence of use should be noted on the Record of Interview whenever visible (e.g. sky dish, aerial lead plugged into television, remote control on settee) as this provides supporting evidence for potential prosecution and may be vital if the confession should later be challenged.'. However, the occupant is well within his/her rights not to answer any questions (remaining silent) and is under no obligation to allow entry into the property.

If an agent has evidence that television is being watched or recorded illegally but is denied entry by the occupants so that they cannot verify the suspicion, then TV Licensing may apply to a magistrate for a search warrant. The BBC states that a search warrant would never be applied for solely on the basis of non-cooperation with TV Licensing and that in the event of being denied access to unlicensed property will use detection equipment rather than a search warrant.

=== Detection technology ===
==== TV detector vans ====
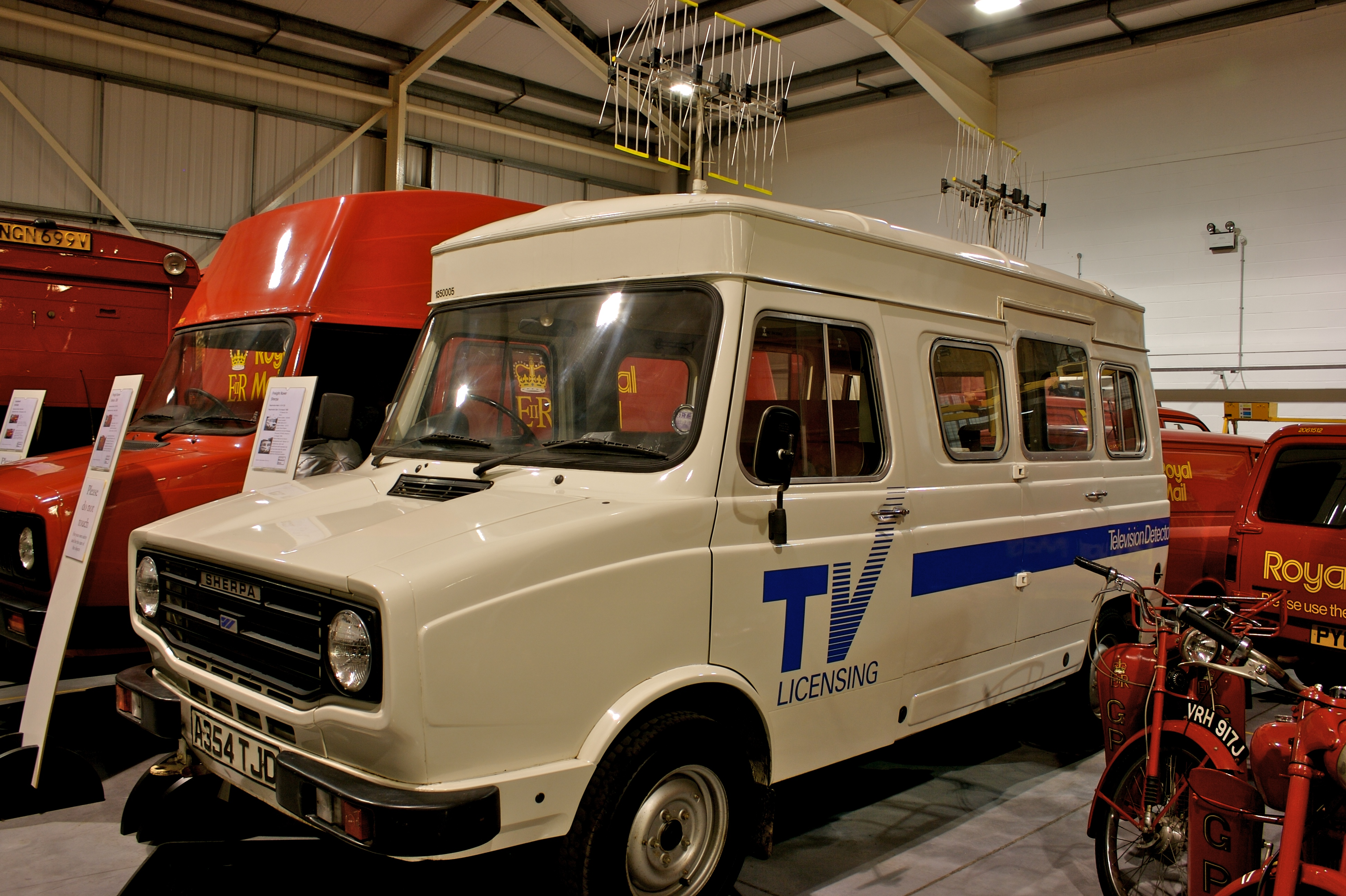
A Leyland Sherpa television detector van

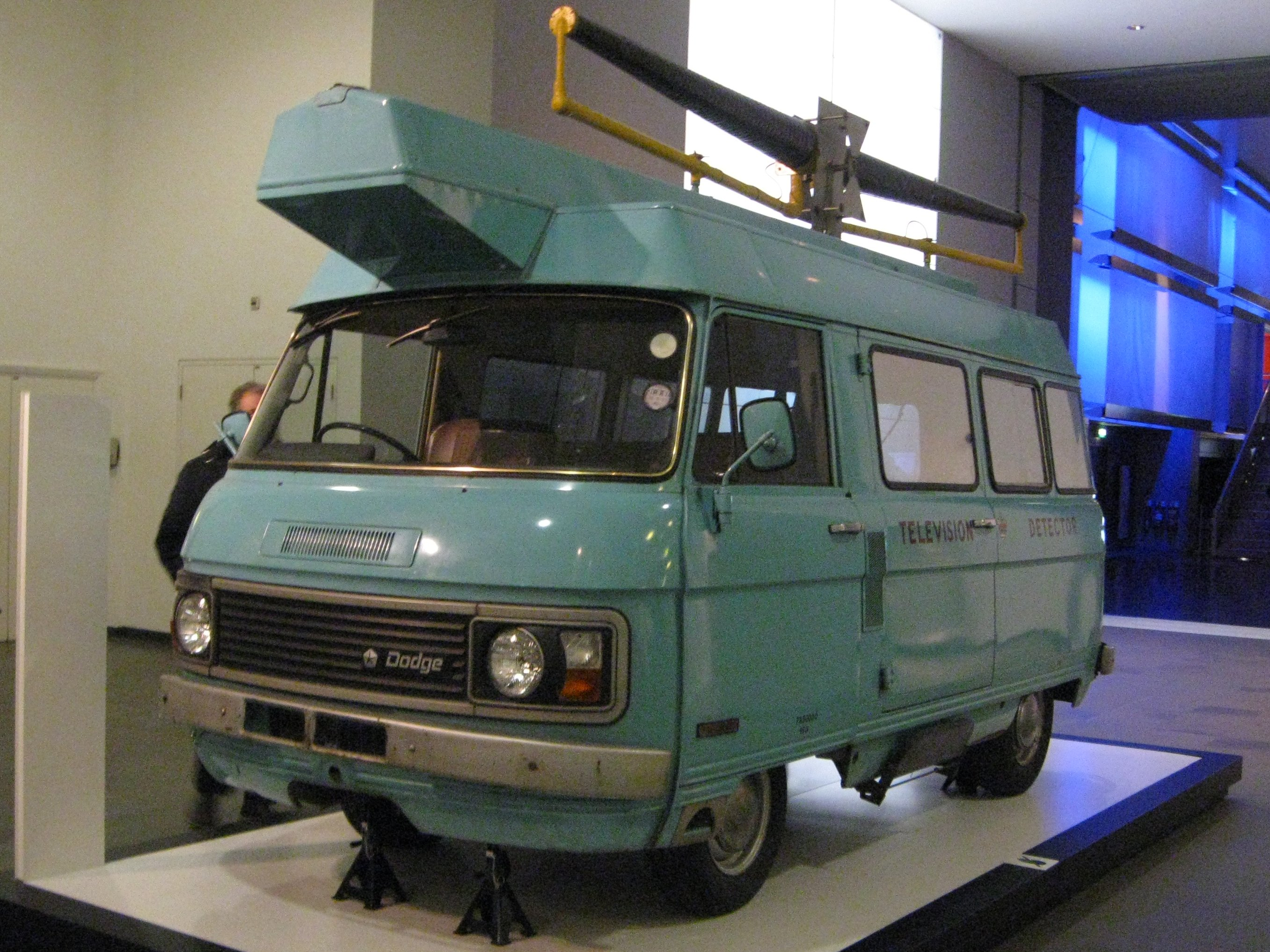
A Dodge television detector van

TV detector vans have in the past featured heavily in TV Licensing publicity, highlighting that technology capable of detecting signals from operating television sets could be employed. Detector vans date from the 1950s, when the Post Office converted Hillman Minx and Morris Oxford estate cars, which had large aerials attached to their roofs. Subsequently Commers were introduced. In the 1980s, vans were supplied by Dodge and Leyland. In the 1990s, Ford Transits were introduced. In 2003, TVL launched its tenth generation of detector vans. It was stated that these vans had removable branding so that they could operate covertly.

Few technical details of the detectors used have been released. In a press release from 2003, the BBC stated that: "the new vans are so powerful they can tell if a television is in use in as little as 20 seconds". It was also stated that the equipment has a range of up to 60 metres (200 ft) and "can pinpoint the actual room that the television set is in". However, on TV Licensing's own site in 2015, no information on range or accuracy of the equipment is given. It instead says that there are "a range of detection tools at our disposal in our vans". It is also stated that the available equipment has been developed in secrecy and that "engineers working on specific detection methods work in isolation – so not even they know how the other detection methods work."

Although no technical details of the television detectors used in these vans have been made public, it is thought that they operate by detecting electromagnetic radiation given off by a television. The most common suggested method is the detection of a signal from the TV's local oscillator.

It has been suggested in the media that television detector vans do not actually exist. A 2013 article in the Radio Times reported that a leaked BBC document on the collection of the licence fee "makes no mention of detector vans – but it does contain plenty of other facts and figures".

==== Hand-held detectors ====
Hand-held television detectors have also been developed by the BBC. In the Birmingham Mail in 2007 the detectors were described as 'little bigger than a torch', weighing 280 g (10 oz), which made a beeping noise when they detect a television.

The company Buckman Hardy Associates has made such equipment for the BBC in the past but the equipment shown in the publicity campaigns run in 2007 was all made by the BBC itself.

==== Optical detectors ====
In 2013, it was revealed that the BBC had used optical television detectors to apply for a search warrant. Although few technical details were given, it was stated in an application for a search warrant that: "the optical detector in the detector van uses a large lens to collect that light and focus it on to an especially sensitive device, which converts fluctuating light signals into electrical signals, which can be electronically analysed. If a receiver is being used to watch broadcast programmes then a positive reading is returned." The BBC stated that this was strong evidence that a set was "receiving a possible broadcast".

==== Legal use of detection technology ====
The BBC states that such technology used in conjunction with targeted advertising acts as a deterrent: its use may make it easier for TV Licensing agents to establish that an offence is likely to be taking place but they would still need to secure further evidence for successful prosecution. Furthermore, such technology is restricted in its use by the meaning of "surveillance and covert human intelligence sources" in the Regulation of Investigatory Powers Act 2000 and the Regulation of Investigatory Powers (British Broadcasting Corporation) Order 2001. Like other public bodies that undertake covert surveillance, the BBC is subject to the scrutiny of the Office of Surveillance Commissioners, which inspects the BBC every other year. A number of official inspection reports on the BBC's detection methods have been made available following freedom of information requests These reports give an outline of the process of authorisation of the use of detection equipment. Briefly, applications for authorisation are made in the name of the Detection Manager of Capita. Correspondence between TV Licensing and the affected householder may be attached to the completed application forms which pass via a quality control 'gatekeeper' to the authorising officers (AOs) at the BBC. In 2012 there were two designated AOs at the BBC. To be authorised, an application must be shown to be 'necessary and proportionate'. AOs sometimes reject applications. Once approved, the authorisation lasts for a duration of eight weeks.

TV Licensing states "detection equipment will only be used if other less intrusive and more cost effective routes have been exhausted", and the BBC has stated that "Detection technology is generally used to obtain search warrants".

In a reply to a FOI request in 2011, the BBC stated "I can confirm that TVL has not, to date, used detection evidence in Court". The BBC also wrote that such evidence "is unnecessary" because "TVL uses detection evidence when applying for search warrants. If, following service of the warrant an individual is found to be evading payment of the TV Licence, then the evidence obtained via the search warrant is used in court, not the detection evidence.

=== Search warrants ===
In some cases, TV Licensing may apply to a magistrate (or a sheriff in Scotland) for a search warrant as part of the enforcement process. According to TV Licensing, such an application may only be made "when there is good reason to believe that an offence has been committed, evidence of the commission of that offence is likely to be found, and conditions regarding access to the property warrant the granting of a search warrant". The same source also states that "The BBC contracts Capita Business Services Ltd to carry out television licensing enforcement activities, including applying for and executing search warrants." The BBC's contractor uses powers granted by Section 366 of the Communications Act 2003 to apply for and exercise search warrants. The Act specifies that the search warrant is valid for a month after being granted. According to the BBC, such warrants are usually executed in the presence of police officers. The TV Licensing Visiting Procedures state: 'To minimise the impact on normal operations Enforcement Managers accompanied by an EO should in normal circumstances execute search warrants. On no account must the warrant be executed without two officers being present. Normally the two officers must be accompanied by a Police Officer'. The warrant provides an authorisation to search a premises, and to examine and test any television receiver found. However, there is no power to seize any apparatus. According to the BBC Search Warrant Policy "force must not be used by TV Licensing to gain entry to a property".

Data on the number of search warrants executed per year in the whole of the UK are not collated or held centrally by the various judicial bodies of the state. However, the BBC, itself, holds the information some of which has become available due to FOI requests. For example, in the financial year 2014–15, TV Licensing applied for 256 warrants to serve in the UK. 167 warrants were granted by the courts of which 115 were executed. In the same year in Scotland no warrants were applied for or served, whilst in Northern Ireland 12 warrants were granted and 7 executed in that year.

Some idea of the frequency at which warrants are used may also be taken from the result of a November 2013 FOI request. It was revealed that Sheffield Magistrates granted TV Licensing a total of six search warrants in the years 2011, 2012 and 2013, whilst in Northampton (including Wellingborough and Kettering) only two were granted in this period.

Information provided by the Scottish Court Service suggests that TV Licensing search warrant applications in Scotland are virtually non-existent. In their response to a FOI request the Scottish Court Service confirmed that no search warrant applications were made to courts in Scotland's two largest cities, Glasgow and Edinburgh, in the three-and-a-half years between 1 January 2011 and 21 July 2014.

=== Prosecution and fiscal fines ===
In 2014, 204,018 people were prosecuted or fined for TV licence offences: 185,580 in England and Wales (173,044 in England and 12,536 in Wales), 4,905 people in Northern Ireland and 15 in the Isle of Man. In Scotland, there were 13,486 cases disposed of via an out of court fine and 32 prosecuted via the courts in 2013–2014. There have been no prosecutions for TV licence offences in Jersey since 2009, all cases having been resolved at Parish Hall Enquiry.

Around 70% of convicted TV licence evaders are female. This 30%–70% male/female ratio is pretty much constant across the whole of the UK and is at odds with statistics for other small crimes . This gender imbalance has not always been the case. In 1980, there were roughly similar numbers of men and women proceeded against for TV licence evasion. Since then the proportion of female to male defendants has risen steadily.

In 2014, 24,025 prosecutions that were commenced by the BBC did not result in conviction (over one-in-ten cases in England and Wales).

Licence evaders are liable for prosecution and a fine of up to £1,000 in the UK. However, because the licensing regime covers six different jurisdictions, the legal processes and penalties for the crime of TV licence evasion differ markedly across the British Islands. The average fine is £170 in England and Wales, £70 in Jersey, £80 in Northern Ireland, £75 in Scotland (out-of-court disposal) and £200 in the Isle of Man.

Television licence evasion is not punishable by a period of imprisonment per se, but if convicted evaders refuse to pay the fine they were ordered to pay, or are incapable of paying it, a period of imprisonment may be imposed as a "last resort". The length of stay is decided by the amount owed. In England and Wales, five people were given an average of 19 days in 2018 (compared to 20 days in 2014, 32 in 2013 and 51 in 2012). There were no custodial sentences imposed during the five-year period 2009–10 to 2013–14 in Scotland or in Jersey.

The British Government proposed decriminalising licence evasion, but the proposition was turned down by a House of Lords vote by 178 to 175 in February 2015. Behavioural research conducted for the BBC predicted that if television licence evasion was decriminalised and the £1,000 maximum fine was replaced by a civil penalty of over £300, evasion rates would increase. The same report recommended to the DCMS that the current system should remain while Baroness Morgan admitted decriminalisation "would have an impact on BBC funding."

==== Convictions ====
In 2023, TV Licensing prosecuted a 57-year-old disabled woman who has Down's Syndrome. When the case reached court, Greenwich Council entered a plea of Guilty on the woman's behalf due to her finances being managed by their Financial Protection and Appointee Team. The woman was convicted and given a six-month conditional discharge, and told to pay a £26 victim surcharge.

On 4 July 2024, The Standard published an article about a 50-year-old dying woman with terminal breast cancer who had been prosecuted and convicted. She received a three-month conditional discharge with an order to pay a £26 fee and court documents also showed that her benefits had been withdrawn.

==== England and Wales ====
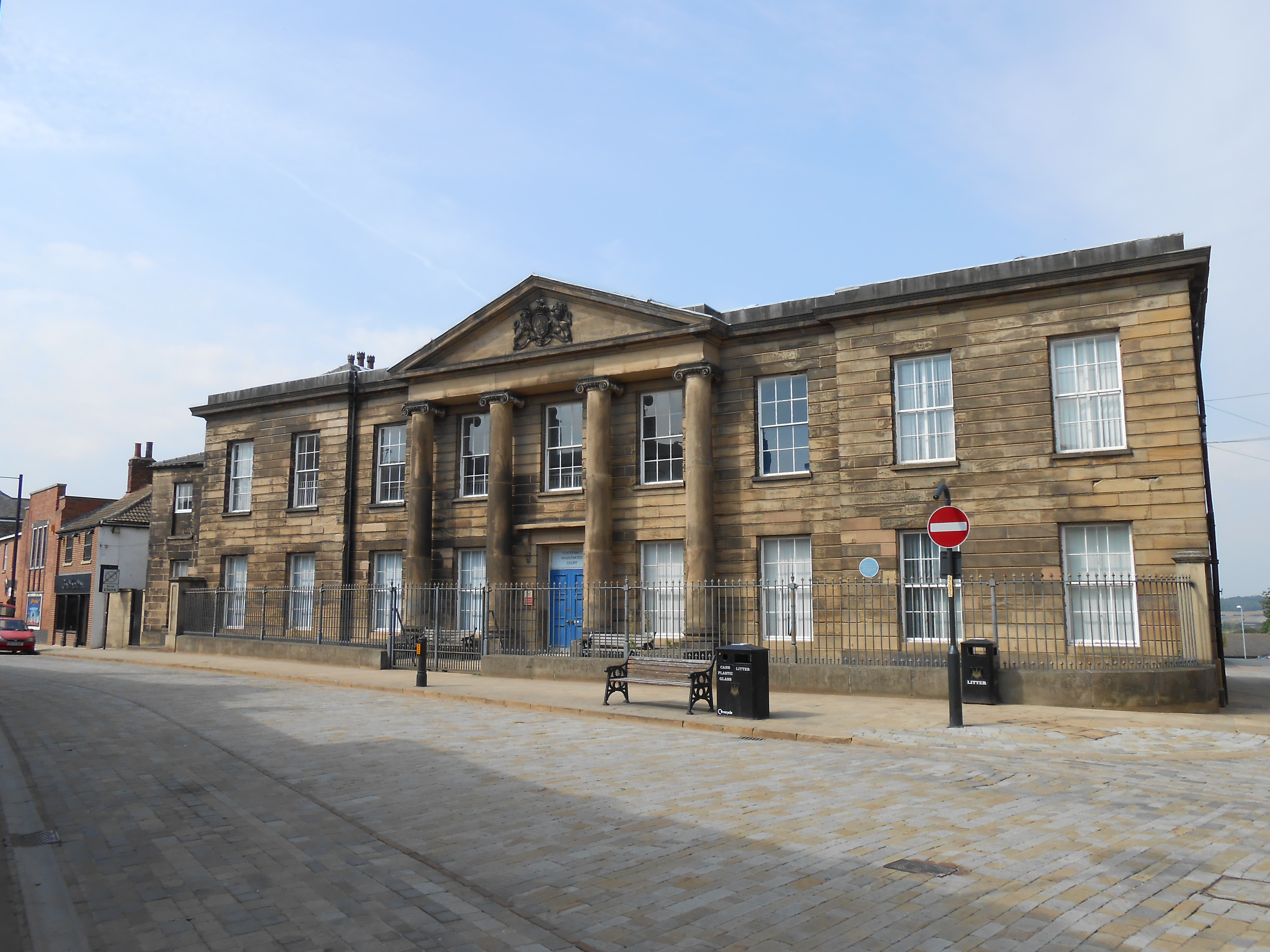
Pontefract Magistrates' Court. In England and Wales, cases involving TV licence evasion are held at magistrates' courts.

In England and Wales, prosecutions are the responsibility of the BBC and are carried out by its contractor, Capita, in magistrates' courts In England and Wales TV Licensing has a maximum of 26 weeks to lay information to court after receiving information regarding unlicensed use of a TV from its enquiry officers. During this period, and a maximum of 24 hours before a decision to prosecute a householder is taken, TV Licensing will check if a licence has been purchased. The decision to prosecute usually takes place 12–14 weeks from receiving the enquiry officer's report. TV Licensing serves documents on defendants four to six weeks prior to a court hearing. A final check to see if a TV licence has been purchased is made a maximum of two days before the hearing.

Licence fee evasion makes up around one-tenth of all cases prosecuted in magistrates' courts and 0.3% of court time. Proceedings for TV Licence evasion form a high percentage of all prosecutions carried out against women – over a third of all cases against women in England and Wales in 2013 were for this offence. By comparison, TV licence evasion made up around 5% of prosecutions against men in 2013 in England and Wales.

The maximum fine for this offence of up to £1,000 is frequently publicised by TV Licensing to maximise deterrence. In reality, magistrates rarely impose the maximum fines allowed to them by law. For example, during the year 2005–6, the average fine including costs was approximately £153 (slightly more than the cost of a licence). According to a 2013 TV Licensing briefing document, the level of fines and costs imposed by magistrates' courts vary considerably between different regions of England and Wales. In North Wales average fines and costs were stated to be £108.90 whilst offenders in the English Midlands area of "Black Country, Staffordshire & West Mercia" were required to pay £197.70.

Magistrates take into account the financial situation of the defendant when imposing fines. They also take into account: whether it is a first offence; if a television licence has been purchased and the length of time a defendant was unlicensed. The following are regarded as 'factors indicating lower culpability' which can result in mitigation of the sentence:

- Accidental oversight or belief licence held
- Confusion of responsibility
- Licence immediately obtained

A guilty plea may also result in a lower fine.

According to TV Licensing: "many evaders claim that an enquiry officer told them they would not be prosecuted if they bought a licence". However, it is also pointed out that "it is a disciplinary offence for an enquiry officer to say or suggest this". Nevertheless, the same TV Licensing briefing does say that: "first-time evaders may escape prosecution if they purchase a licence immediately".

The UK government has stated that: "Most TV licensing cases that are heard by magistrates courts are uncontested and the case is therefore often resolved in the defendant's absence."

The Magistrates' Association has been calling for the decriminalisation of television licence evasion for nearly twenty years, concerned that evaders are punished disproportionately. The Adam Smith Institute has published a report calling for the BBC to give up the licence fee. One of the reasons given is the licence fee criminalises poor people, in particular women with children living on welfare. The report claims that such people could be liable to be re-prosecuted almost immediately unless they dispose of their TVs. In fact, a National Audit Office report from 2002 stated that "significant numbers of offenders do not buy a licence following conviction".

TV Licensing is managed as a sales operation and its officers are motivated by commission payments. In 2005, a TV Licensing officer was found guilty of false accounting and perverting the course of justice after he deliberately forged the confessions of four people to obtain commission payments. In April 2012 an Essex man convicted of TV licence evasion had his conviction overturned when TV Licensing were unable to confirm the validity of video evidence they presented in the original trial.

According to TV Licensing, 30% of those prosecuted for television licence evasion in 2012 were found to have satellite or cable subscriptions.

In 2018, there were a total of 129,446 cases in England and Wales where television licence evasion was the principal offence. Of these, 121,203 people were convicted.

Number of offences under Wireless Telegraphy Acts in England and Wales (overwhelmingly made up of television licensing cases)
	2009	2010	2011	2012	2013
Number of proceedings	166,944	164,462	170,650	193,049	178,332
Found guilty	148,867	142,386	149,239	164,932	153,369
Average fine	£167	£171	£169	£169	£170

==== Northern Ireland ====
In Northern Ireland, prosecutions are the responsibility of the BBC and are carried out by its contractor, Capita, in magistrates' courts. The prosecution process is very similar to that of England and Wales.

In 2008, 5,272 people in Northern Ireland were prosecuted for non-payment of the television licence fee of which 4,118 were fined. The corresponding figures for 2007 were 5,901 people prosecuted and 4,464 fines imposed.

==== Scotland ====
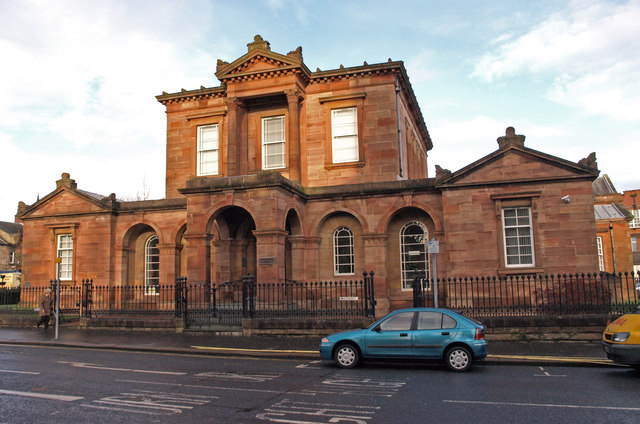
Procurator Fiscal's Office in Kilmarnock. In Scotland, the decision to prosecute television licensing cases is taken by the Crown Office and Procurator Fiscal Office. Very few cases come to court in Scotland.

In Scotland, the Crown Office and Procurator Fiscal Office undertakes prosecutions for TV licence evasion. Very few cases in Scotland come to court.

Instead of prosecution, in Scotland, television licence fee evaders are usually asked by the Procurator Fiscal to pay a fiscal fine and a small number are simply given a warning. For example, in 2013–2014, just ten cases reached the courts whereas 12,969 people were asked to pay a fiscal fine, no action was taken in 275 cases and 174 people were sent a warning. In addition, two people were asked to pay compensation and one person was offered the chance to pay a combination of fiscal fine and compensation. In 2013–14, almost all of the fiscal fines (12,603 out of 12,969) were at the level 2 rate of £75. In 2014–15, 13% of all fiscal fines in Scotland were issued for Communications Act offences, stated to be mainly television licensing offences. The total number of fiscal fines imposed for these offences was 4,874. In 2015–16, 7,962 fiscal fines were issued for Communications Act offences, of which 72% were issued to women. In 2016–17, there were a total of 4,799 fiscal fines imposed for Communications Act offences.

In the years 2016–17 and 2017–18, prosecutions against suspected licence fee evaders were reduced to single figures. In 2016–17, 5 people were prosecuted of which 4 were found guilty. In the following year there were 6 prosecutions resulting in 5 guilty verdicts.

Outcomes of TV Licensing charges reported to the Procurator Fiscal.
	2010–11	2011–12	2012–13	2013–14
No action	498	865	599	275
Warning	832	536	2219	174
Fiscal fine	9522	12665	16403	12969
Court proceedings	9	35	17	10

==== Isle of Man ====
On the Isle of Man, prosecutions are prepared by Capita on behalf of the BBC although they use Manx qualified lawyers in the Magistrates' Court. The maximum fine is £1,000.

In a submission to Tynwald (the Isle of Man Government) regarding prosecution for non-payment of the BBC licence fee in the Crown dependencies, the BBC stated 59 cases were laid to court in the Isle of Man between 2007 and 2009, although "these figures include cases where no further action may have been taken (e.g. because a writ was not served or the case was withdrawn)".

Number of offences prosecuted of "no television/radio licence" recorded by the Constabulary of the Isle of Man
	2011–12	2012–13	2013–14	2014–15	2015–16	2016–17	2017–18
Number of prosecutions	0	0	93	0	119	68	14

In its response to the UK Government's TV Licence Fee Enforcement Review, published in 2015, the Isle of Man Government 'agreed that it is supportive of the decriminalisation of non-payment of the TV licence fee'.

==== Guernsey ====
The maximum fine for licence fee evasion in Guernsey is £2,000. Initial investigations into licence fee evasion are carried out by Capita employees as in the UK. However, prosecutions are carried out by police and law officers. According to the States of Guernsey: "it appears the TV Licensing Inspectors visit the island once every three to four years, therefore offences are usually reported to us following these visits." In June 2013, Capita's television licensing enforcement officers visited Guernsey where according to the BBC, they found "130 people illegally watching TV without a licence". The Guernsey Police Annual Report 2014 states that no offences of "television receiver without a licence – install/use" were recorded in 2014 as opposed to two such cases in 2013.

Number of offences of "television receiver without a licence – install/use" recorded by the police in Guernsey
	2005	2006	2007	2008	2009	2010	2011	2012	2013	2014	2015
Number of offences	18	15	10	0	0	9	0	0	2	0	Offence not listed

==== Jersey ====
According to the States of Jersey government: "Enforcement in Jersey is initiated by the TV Licensing function of the BBC which passes information onto the Jersey Police who then conduct their own investigation. A fine for a television licensing offence can only be levied following successful prosecution at the Magistrate's Court: the Centenier does not have the power to summarily levy a fine for a television licensing offence at a Parish Hall Enquiry." The maximum fines for this offence in Jersey is £500. Prosecutions are carried out by the Centenier. According to the BBC: "in the case of Jersey we can say that between 2007 and 2009 41 cases were laid to court". In a response to a freedom of information request, the States of Jersey Police stated: "in 2014 there were fourteen prosecutions for having 'no TV licence'. All received cautions at the Parish Hall. Of the 14, eight were male and six were female. There were no prosecutions in 2015." There were no prosections in 2016.

==== Enforcement overview ====
Enforcement overview (note the BBC contracts most of its enforcement work to Capita)
	England & Wales	Scotland	Northern Ireland	Isle of Man	Guernsey	Jersey
Investigating authority	BBC	BBC but decision to prosecute taken by a procurator fiscal	BBC	BBC	BBC passes cases to an inspector in the Guernsey prosecution unit, with the evidence reviewed by law officers	BBC initially, information passed to police who conduct their own investigation
Prosecuting authority	BBC	Procurator fiscal	BBC	BBC (using Manx lawyers)	Police and law officers	Centenier
Legislation	Communications Act 2003; Police and Criminal Evidence Act 1984	Communications Act 2003; Criminal Procedure (Scotland) Act 1995	Communications Act 2003; Police and Criminal Evidence Order 1989	Communications (Isle of Man) Order 2003; Police Powers and Procedures Act 1998	Communications (Balliwick of Guernsey) Order 2004; Police Powers and Criminal Evidence (Balliwick of Guernsey) 2003	Broadcasting & Communications (Jersey) Order 2004; Police Powers and Criminal Evidence (Jersey) Law 2003
Maximum fine	£1,000	£1,000	£1,000	£1,000	£2,000	£500
Case heard by	Magistrates' court	Sheriff court	District judge	Magistrates' Court	Magistrates' court	Magistrates' court

== Opinions on the licence fee ==
=== Opinion polls ===
In 2004, the BBC reported that "Almost 70% of people in the UK want changes to the way the BBC is funded", following an ICM poll for their current affairs programme Panorama, which showed that 31% were in favour of the existing licence fee system, 36% said the BBC should be paid for by a subscription and 31% wanted advertising to pay for the programmes.

In August 2008, the Guardian newspaper reported that "The BBC is facing an uphill battle to maintain support for the licence fee", stating that according to an Ipsos MORI poll the newspaper had commissioned, 41% agreed and 37% disagreed that the licence fee is an "appropriate funding mechanism". When asked whether the licence fee is "good value for money", however, 47% disagreed, with more than half of them disagreeing strongly. The poll also showed that there is no longer a majority believing that the licence fee assured them of distinctive programming not available elsewhere — which, the newspaper said, had long been one of the arguments for its existence: 41% of the population disagreed with only 30% agreeing. The poll also showed that opinion was split by a growing north–south and socio-economic divide.

In September 2009, the Guardian reported an ICM poll showing an increase in support for the licence fee to 43%; "The fee is backed by 43%, against 24% who think advertising should foot the bill and 30% who think people should pay to subscribe if they want to see BBC programmes. In 2004, only 31% backed the licence fee, 12 points lower than today.".

In 2013, according to an ICM poll for the Sunday Telegraph, 70% stated that the BBC licence fee should be abolished or cut. 49% of those polled believed the fee should be scrapped altogether.

In December 2019, a Savanta ComRes poll indicated that 2 out of 3 want the BBC licence fee abolished or reformed. A few days later, a Public First poll conducted for BBC Radio 4's Today Programme found that 74% of respondents want the licence fee abolished.

In February 2020, a ComRes poll for the Sunday Express found that 61% of respondents want the BBC Licence Fee abolished. The same survey showed that 63% of people polled felt the BBC is an "important part of British culture" and the BBC questioned whether the results were skewed by not explaining what cuts would ensue.

In March 2020, Press Gazette magazine ran a poll showing that 53% of its readers backed the compulsory licence fee model, while 47% were in favour of scrapping it.

=== Views of official bodies and policy institutes ===
Previous inquiries, such as the parliamentary Peacock Committee in 1986 and the internal Davies committee in 2000, recommended continuing the licence fee, with conditions. In 2001, an Ofcom report found that the vast majority of those it interviewed, including owners of digital television equipment, supported the principle of a licence fee to fund public service television and radio. The advantages of such funding listed by those interviewed included diversity, high quality, education, innovation, entertainment, information, original productions, pluralism, accessibility, inclusion of minorities and free access. Another reason given in a response to Ofcom by the National Union of Journalists was that the licence fee allows the BBC to "retain independence" from both commercial and political pressures.

Nonetheless, having surveyed public opinion during December 2003, a finding of the Department for Culture, Media and Sport was that "the way the licence fee is set and collected raised issues about fairness". Further criticisms, embodied in a 2005 Green Paper, included cost, value for money, whether or not the BBC should be publicly funded, the high cost of collection and enforcement and the methods used.

Meanwhile, in 2004, the Institute for Public Policy Research criticised the television licence fee for its regressive impact, pointing out that it represents a much higher proportion of income for poor households, that evaders are most likely to be single parents, lone tenants, pensioners and the economically inactive and that the difficulties they have in paying the licence fee are compounded by the penalties enforced for non-payment.

Other technologies for receiving visual media, such as mobile phones and computers connected to the Internet, has led to questions over whether or not a licence fee based on television receiver ownership can continue to be justified when a television receiver is no longer the sole medium over which the BBC distributes its content; and these technological changes led the Department for Culture, Media and Sport to state in 2005 that the collection of a fixed charge based on television ownership may become difficult to sustain.

In 2006, the House of Lords select committee on BBC Charter Review criticised the reclassification of the licence fee as a tax, pointing out that the BBC was in consequence reclassified as a central government body, with "significant implications for the BBC's independence".

In a debate in the UK Parliament in October 2013, the licence fee was referred to as 'a flat-rate poll tax' and as 'probably the UK's most regressive tax'.

Some critics claim that the licensing system interferes with the freedom to receive information and contend that this is a contravention of Article 10 of the European Convention on Human Rights (the right to freedom of expression). In a case dealing with the German radio licence, the ECHR in Application No. 26907/95 stated "Such an undertaking cannot be successfully accomplished unless it is grounded in the principle of pluralism, of which the State is the ultimate guarantor." and "The interference complained of was, therefore, necessary in a democratic society. There is, accordingly, no appearance of a violation of the applicant's right under Article 10 (Art. 10)."

=== Media views ===
The television licence fee system has been variously criticised, commented upon and defended by the press. In 2010, the journalist Charles Moore was fined by a magistrates' court for watching TV without a licence. Moore had refused to pay in protest at the BBC's unwillingness to dismiss Jonathan Ross in the wake of his involvement in The Russell Brand Show prank telephone calls. Later, Moore was to describe the BBC licence fee as "the most regressive and most ruthlessly collected of all government imposts". In 2014, Nick Ross, a BBC presenter, stated that the licence fee was unfair and should be abolished.

=== Gender disparity ===
A review by the TV Licensing Agency published in 2017 considered the gender disparity in television licence prosecutions. 72% of prosecutions for television licence evasion in 2017 were against women. Television licence evasion is the most common offence for which women are prosecuted in the UK. Although the review found that "There is no evidence of any discriminatory enforcement practices on the part of TV Licensing" commentators have highlighted the ongoing factors of poverty, debt and working in the home which combine to make it more likely that women will be charged with this crime than men. Women in the UK are nearly ten times more likely to be convicted than men and this leads to suggestions that the BBC may be guilty of "indirect gender discrimination". In 2020, in the light of a threatened judicial review the BBC agreed to follow up on the 2017 report and consider the structural sex discrimination which might exist in the scheme leading to this skewed level of prosecutions.

=== Websites and blogs ===
There are a number of websites that campaign against the television licence. The BBC monitors the Internet for references to TV Licensing. According to the BBC "searches are carried out for the purpose of identifying external information relating to TV Licensing such that, where appropriate, we can respond and assist licence fee payers or correct inaccurate information as well as flag up customer complaints." Part of this monitoring 'flags up' critical comments about TV Licensing. An internal briefing note released by the BBC in response to a freedom of information request names the TV Licensing Blog as TV Licensing's "most prevalent activist" who has "built a significant following both for his blog and for his @TVLicensingblog Twitter feed (over 900 followers)". The BBC also monitors YouTube videos of enquiry officers and YouTube videos critical of TV Licensing as well as social media such as Facebook and Twitter.

In June 2020, a campaign called "Defund the BBC" was founded by James Yucel, a student at Glasgow University, supported by political commentator and activist Darren Grimes. The group was featured on Dan Wootton's Talkradio show and currently has over 100,000 Twitter followers.

=== Opinions on collection and enforcement methods ===
In September 2008, the BBC's governing body, the BBC Trust, launched a review of TV Licensing's methods, following complaints about "heavy-handed" and "intimidating" tactics and during December 2008, it was reported by the press that the chairman of the all-party Commons Culture, Media and Sport committee had accused TV Licensing of behaving "like the Gestapo", employing "tactics that are outrageous", saying: "The tactics used by TV Licensing in their letters are intimidatory and cause genuine distress. Their records are not always correct, but they write letters that assume members of the public are criminals".

In 2008, former BBC television personality Noel Edmonds stated that he had stopped paying his television licence in a protest at the tone of BBC adverts aimed at television licence evaders.

=== Isle of Man ===
The licensing system remains controversial in the Isle of Man due to the fact that the licence fee remains the same as in the UK and Channel Islands, even though the BBC provides neither a local television news service for the Isle of Man (similar to BBC Channel Islands) nor any BBC local radio or national radio opt-out station. The BBC has sought to redress the lack of coverage by improving its online news service for the Isle of Man, with permanent BBC staff based at the Manx Radio studios in Douglas. A select committee of Tynwald was established in 2009 to investigate the value for money of the licensing system for the Isle of Man and the feasibility of the Isle of Man withdrawing from it.

== Future of the licence fee ==
The current Royal Charter for the BBC expires on 31 December 2027. In recent times, there has been musings from bureaucrats and elected officials that the licence fee system will be reformed or completely abolished for the next Royal Charter. However, the government has stated that "while the current licence fee collection system is in operation, the current system of criminal deterrence and prosecution should be maintained".

In January 2022, the then Secretary of State for Digital, Culture, Media and Sport Nadine Dorries announced plans to terminate the licence after the current charter expires.

In March 2024, the Director General announced that the BBC would carry out a review of the licence fee, with a focus on reforms.

In April 2025, Culture Secretary Lisa Nandy stated the Licence Fee had become "unenforceable" and that the government was actively considering alternatives to the licence fee including making the BBC an optional paid subscription service similar to Sky and streaming service such as Disney+ and Netflix.

On 16 December 2025, the UK government considered a green paper of new ways to fund the BBC, such as replacing the television licence with either advertising or a subscription model.

On the 15 October 2026, it was reported the BBC are looking at ways to extend the licence fee with a ‘YouTube tax’ covering streaming services. A government white paper set to be published before Christmas is expected to include plans to extend the licence fee to cover YouTube, Netflix, Amazon and Disney Plus.

== Notes ==
The Communications (Television Licensing) Regulations 2004 gives the following definition:

- "Television receiver" means any apparatus installed or used for the purpose of receiving (whether by means of wireless telegraphy or otherwise) any television programme service, whether or not it is installed or used for any other purpose.
- Any reference to receiving a television programme service includes a reference to receiving by any means any programme included in that service, where that programme is received at the same time (or virtually the same time) as it is received by members of the public by virtue of its being broadcast or distributed as part of that service.
