= Eid in the Square =

Annual Muslim festival in London, England

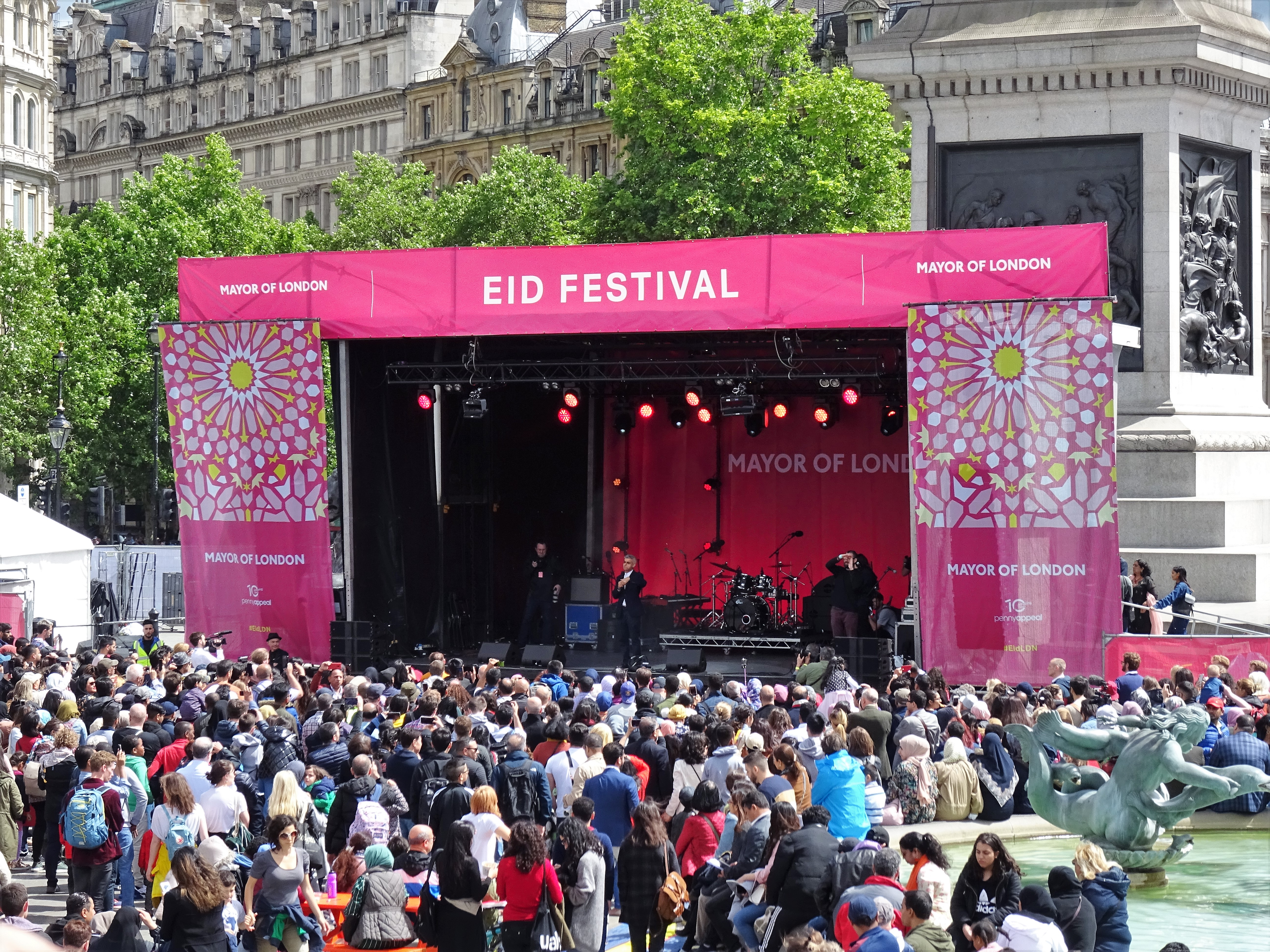
- London Mayor, Sadiq Khan, at Eid in the Square in June 2019
- Status: Active
- Genre: Festival
- Date: First Saturday after Eid al-Fitr
- Frequency: Annually
- Venue: Trafalgar Square
- Locations: Westminster, London, England
- Country: United Kingdom
- Years active: 2006–present
- Inaugurated: 2006
- Most recent: 2023
- Next event: 2024
- Attendance: 25,000
- Organiser: Mayor's Office and Eid Committee

Eid in the Square is an annual Muslim festival held the first Saturday after the Islamic religious holiday of Eid al-Fitr at Trafalgar Square in Westminster, London, England. The event has grown to become one of the key cultural highlights of London's events calendar and sees attendances of over 25,000.

== Premise ==
Eid in the Park is a free event/ festival for people of all faiths inaugurated in 2006 and hosted by the Mayor of London on the first Saturday after the Islamic religious holiday of Eid al-Fitr which marks and celebrates the end of the Islamic holy month of Ramadan at the Trafalgar Square in Westminster, London, England from 12 noon to 6 pm.

The first event took place on Saturday 28 October 2006 from 1 pm to 5 pm, and was organised by the Muslim Council of Britain and the Mayor of London Ken Livingstone. The event is now organised by the Mayor of London with the support of the Eid Committee (a voluntary organisation which represents various Muslim community groups and organisations in London), Lycamobile and the official media partner for the event is Zee TV. Partners of the festival have included the Muslim Council of Britain, Transport for London, Muslim Aid, Islamic Relief, Islam Channel and UNISON.

The event has grown to become one of the key cultural highlights of London's events calendar and sees crowds of over 25,000 attending.

In 2006, Ken Livingstone, the Mayor of London said: "Eid ul-fitr is the most auspicious day of the Muslim calendar. It is a day of great joy and serves as a reminder to people of all faiths of the importance of peace, compassion, unity and charity..." In 2007, Livingston insisted that "Eid celebrations in Trafalgar Square provide an opportunity for Muslims and non-Muslims to "unite and experience the cultural richness and diversity of Islam." In 2007, Muslim Council of Britain Secretary General Dr Muhammad Abdul Bari said, "Muslim Londoners are rightly proud of London's success story and long may it continue." In 2013, Mayor of London Boris Johnson said, "...I hope that Londoners from all communities will take the opportunity to join our festivities in Trafalgar Square." In 2014, he described the event as "a chance to join together and rejoice in the global diversity of the capital. Eid Mubarak!"

In 2013, Neeraj Dhingra, CEO of Zee Network Europe said: "Multiculturalism is what London stands for and at the heart of all our entertainment across Zee Network channels..." Lebara Mobile's UK managing director, Justin Cockerill, said: "We are delighted to be associated with the Mayor's Eid Festival taking place in Trafalgar Square, London..."

== Features ==
Eid in the Square has become an anticipated fixture in London's events calendar, attracting large crowds. The free event includes a variety of diverse performances that reflect the diversity, culture and languages of the varied Muslim communities in London. It is an open invitation to everyone in the city – Muslim and non-Muslim alike - to experience Islamic heritage.

It includes Qu'ran recitations, call to prayer, souks, bazaars, market stalls, poetry and music performances and celebrity guest appearances. The main stage features live folk music, rock bands, a children's choir, theatrical performances, speeches, interactive workshops and video shows.

The exhibition area organised by the Eid Committee includes theatre, live entertainment, live music, performances, exhibits, calligraphy, mosque architecture, Islamic art and food stalls. There is exhibitions of art and culture including, arts and crafts, exhibitions and displays about Islam, entertainers, storytellers calligraphy, henna, face painting, stalls selling souvenirs, plus a global food festival outlets serving cuisines from across the Islamic world including; Turkish, Egyptian, Indonesian, Lebanese and Moroccan, Malaysian, South Asian, Arabic and more. There are performances in different languages; French, Arabic, English, Urdu, Spanish and many more. Performers and artists come from various countries and backgrounds including Pakistan, London, North Africa, Somalia, Egypt, Venezuela and the Middle East.

Square event Eid Festival housed many stalls that's includes cultural stalls from different parts of the world, food stalls, face painting, clothes, jewellery, calligraphy and art stalls. Beside these many NGOs, British Heat Foundation and other social communities display their stalls too. Eid in the square event were attended by number of participants.

It also brings together musicians and performers, from UK and abroad, both traditional and modern, showcasing Nasheed artists singing in many languages, including Arabic, Turkish and English.

== See also ==
- Islam in the United Kingdom
