= The Post Office Electrical Engineers' Journal =

- Language: English

Publication details
- History: 1908-1982
- Publisher: Institution of Post Office Electrical Engineers (United Kingdom)
- Frequency: Quarterly

Standard abbreviations
- ISO 4: Post Off. Electr. Eng. J.

The Post Office Electrical Engineers' Journal (POEEJ) was a quarterly technical journal published by the Institution of Post Office Electrical Engineers between 1908 and 1982. 74 volumes were published in all.

When Post Office Telecommunications became British Telecom in 1981, shortly before the latter's privatisation, the Institution changed its name to the Institution of British Telecommunications Engineers. Publication of the POEEJ then ceased in favour of a new journal, British Telecommunications Engineering.

The POEEJ documented the development of Britain's telecommunications network throughout most of the 20th century. Special issues marked key events such as the end of World War II, the construction of TAT-1 and the introduction of Subscriber trunk dialling.

According to one source, in 1972 the journal had 38,000 readers, of which about 4,500 were not Post Office employees.

== See also ==
- Pochtovo-Telegrafnyi Zhurnal
- Telecommunications in the United Kingdom
