= Arthur Barrett =

Arthur Barrett may refer to:

- Sir Arthur Barrett (Indian Army officer) (1857–1926), British Indian Army field marshal
- Arthur Barrett (cricketer) (1944–2018), Jamaican legspinner
- Arthur Barrett (footballer) (1927–2011), English footballer for Tranmere Rovers
- Arthur Barrett (priest) (born 1960), Anglican priest

== See also ==
- Arthur Barratt (1891–1966), officer in the Royal Flying Corps, and the Royal Air Force
