= John Wellwood (priest) =

Priest

John Wellwood, D.D. (died 1670) was a 17th-century English Anglican priest in Ireland.

Wellwood was born in Raphoe and educated at Trinity College, Dublin. He was Dean of Raphoe from 1661 until his death.

Church of Ireland titles
Preceded by John Leslie	Dean of Raphoe; 1661–1670	Succeeded by Ezekiel Hopkins
