= George Bowen =

British colonial administrator (1821–1899)

The Right Honourable Sir George Bowen GCMG
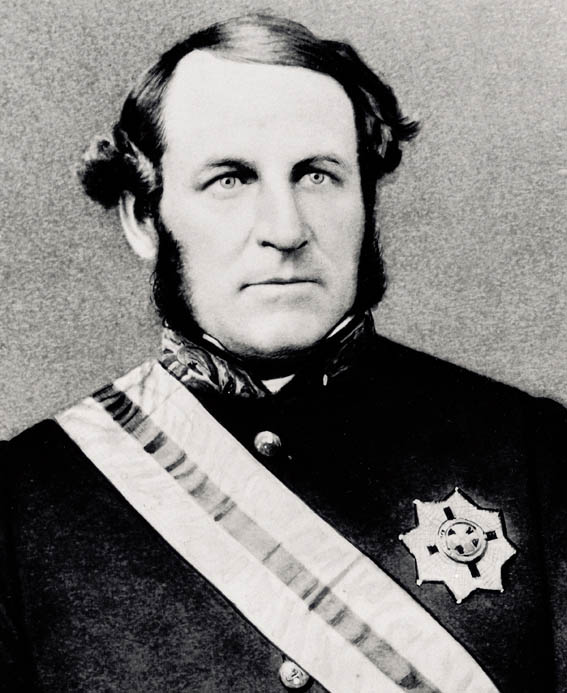

1st Governor of Queensland
- In office 10 December 1859 – 4 January 1868
- Monarch: Victoria
- Preceded by: Office Established
- Succeeded by: Samuel Blackall

5th Governor of New Zealand
- In office 5 February 1868 – 19 March 1873
- Monarch: Victoria
- Premier: Edward Stafford; William Fox; George Waterhouse
- Preceded by: Sir George Grey
- Succeeded by: Sir James Fergusson

5th Governor of Victoria
- In office 30 July 1873 – 22 February 1879
- Monarch: Victoria
- Preceded by: Sir John Manners-Sutton
- Succeeded by: The 2nd Marquess of Normanby

13th Governor of Mauritius
- In office 4 April 1879 – 9 December 1880
- Monarch: Victoria
- Preceded by: Arthur Purves Phayre
- Succeeded by: Frederick Broome

9th Governor of Hong Kong
- In office 30 March 1883 – 6 October 1887
- Monarch: Victoria
- Lieutenant Governor: LTG John Sargent; LTG Sir William Cameron
- Colonial Secretary: William Henry Marsh; Frederick Stewart
- Preceded by: Sir John Pope Hennessy
- Succeeded by: Sir George William Des Vœux

Personal details
- Born: George Ferguson Bowen; 2 November 1821 Taughboyne, County Donegal, Ireland
- Died: 21 February 1899 (aged 77) Brighton, England
- Resting place: Kensal Green Cemetery
- Spouses: Diamantina di Roma (m. 1856; died 1893) Letitia Florence White (m. 1896)
- Education: Trinity College, Oxford
- Profession: colonial administrator

Chinese name
- Traditional Chinese: 寶雲
- Simplified Chinese: 宝云
Transcriptions
Yue: Cantonese
- Yale Romanization: Bóu wàhn
- Jyutping: Bou^{2} wan^{4}

Sir George Ferguson Bowen GCMG PC (Chinese: 寶雲; 2 November 1821 – 21 February 1899) was an Anglo-Irish author and colonial administrator who served as a governor of Queensland, New Zealand, Victoria, Mauritius and Hong Kong and as chief secretary of Ionian Islands.

== Early life ==
Bowen was born the eldest son of the Rev. Edward Bowen (1779–1867), Church of Ireland Rector of Taughboyne, a parish in the Laggan district in the east of County Donegal in the north-west of Ulster. It is likely that Bowen was born and raised at Bogay House, just outside the village of Newtown Cunningham, at what was then the northern end of the Church of Ireland Parish of Taughboyne. Bogay (pronounced 'Bo-gay') House had been built c. 1730, possibly for The 6th Earl of Abercorn, and was later used as the Church of Ireland rectory for Taughboyne in the late eighteenth century and for most of the nineteenth century. One of Bowen's brothers was The V. Rev. Edward Bowen, Church of Ireland Dean of Raphoe from 1882 onwards.

Bowen was educated at Charterhouse School and Trinity College, Oxford. He matriculated at Oxford in 1840, and graduated with a first-class B.A. in classics in 1844 (promoted to M.A. in 1847). Bowen was twice President of the Oxford Union. He was elected a fellow of Brasenose College, Oxford, and entered Lincoln's Inn as a student, both in 1844. In 1846 Bowen had some naval training, serving for sixteen days on HMS Victory.

== Service in the Ionian Islands ==
In 1847, Bowen was appointed president of the Ionian Academy located in Corfu, a post he held until 1851.

Bowen became the chief secretary to the government of the Ionian Islands in 1854. While in that post, he married the Contessa Diamantina di Roma on 28 April 1856. Diamantina was the daughter of Conte Giorgio-Candiano Roma and his wife Contessa Orsola, née di Balsamo. The Roma family were local aristocracy; her father being the President of the Ionian Senate, titular head of the Islands, from 1850 to 1856. He was appointed a Companion of the Order of St Michael and St George (CMG) in 1855 and was advanced to Knight Commander (KCMG) in the following year.

== Governor of Queensland ==
In 1859, Bowen was appointed the first Governor of Queensland, a colony that had just been separated from New South Wales. Sworn in on 10 December 1859, Bowen served until 1868. Bowen's influence in Queensland was greater than that of the governors in other Australian colonies in a large part due to Robert Herbert, who accompanied Bowen from England, and later became colonial secretary and then first Premier of Queensland in 1860–66. Bowen was interested in the exploration of Queensland and in the establishment of a volunteer force, but incurred some unpopularity by refusing to sanction the issue of inconvertible paper money during the financial crisis of 1866. But overall, he was quite popular in Queensland, so that the citizens requested an extension of his five-year term as governor, resulting in his staying for further two years.

== Governor of New Zealand ==
The flag of New Zealand as designed by Markham in 1869, approved by Bowen.

In 1867 Bowen was made Governor of New Zealand, where he was successful in reconciling the Māori reaction to British rule and saw the end of the New Zealand Wars. Bowen also instituted the New Zealand Cross for colonial soldiers, one of the rarest bravery awards in the world and equivalent to the Victoria Cross (he was reprimanded for exceeding his authority, but it was upheld by Queen Victoria herself).

In 1869, Albert Hastings Markham, first lieutenant of HMS Blanche submitted a design to Bowen for a national ensign for New Zealand. His proposal, incorporating the Southern Cross, was approved and remains in use to this day. In 1871, he visited Milford Sound aboard HMS Clio and Bowen Falls was named after his wife to mark the occasion.

== Governor of Victoria ==
In March 1873, Bowen was transferred to the colony of Victoria as the Governor of Victoria, where he embarked on an endeavour to reduce the expenses of the colony. A political crisis occurred while Bowen took leave in England from January 1875 to January 1876, when the acting governor, Sir William Stawell, showed "too little flexibility in the exercise of his temporary powers". One of the main issues was the perennial conflict between the Victorian Legislative Council and the Victorian Legislative Assembly; the Council was blocking legislation for its reform and for payment of members.

In January 1878, backed by advice from the Colonial Office, Bowen consented to premier Graham Berry's plan to break the deadlock by the wholesale dismissal of public servants on so-called "Black Wednesday". In May that year, Bowen said that "my reluctant consent, purely on constitutional grounds, to these dismissals ... has damaged my further reputation and my career to a degree that I shall never recover. It will never be forgotten either in England or in the Colony". However several others, including Hugh Childers and William Ewart Gladstone, approved of Bowen's actions, and he was appointed to subsequent vice-regal posts.

== Governor of Mauritius ==
Bowen arrived on Mauritius on 4 April 1879, and served as 13th Governor of the colony until 9 December 1880.

== Governor of Hong Kong ==
On 30 March 1883, Bowen was made Governor of Hong Kong. During his tenure, his administration established the Hong Kong Observatory, which also served as the meteorological institute of the territory. He founded the first college in Hong Kong, and ordered the construction of the Typhoon Shelter in Causeway Bay, and a government hospital. He retired in 1887, due to ill health.

== Post-governorship ==
Bowen returned to England after his time in Hong Kong and was appointed chief of a Royal Commission sent to Malta in December 1887 to help to draft the new constitution for the island. All recommendations made by the commission were adopted. Afterwards, Bowen was sworn into the Privy Council.

== Personal life ==
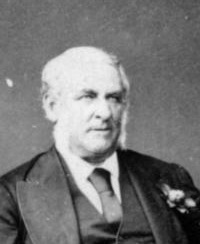
Sir George Bowen

Bowen was married twice.

His first wife was Contessa Diamantina di Roma, only daughter of Count Candiano di Roma. Their children were:

- first child, a son who died when twelve days old, born in the Ionian Islands
- Adelaide Diamantina (Nina) Bowen, born 17 August 1858 in the Ionian Islands
- Zoe Caroline Bowen, born 28 August 1860 at Adelaide House (the temporary Government House), Brisbane, Queensland
- Agnes Herbert Bowen, born 26 July 1862 at the first Government House in Brisbane
- George William Howard Bowen, born 9 April 1864 at the first Government House, in Brisbane
- Alfreda Ernestina Albertina Bowen, born 10 April 1869 at Old Government House, Auckland, New Zealand

Diamantina died in London in 1893 at about the age of 60.

He married his second wife, Letitia Florence White, in late 1896 at Chelsea, London. Florence was the daughter of Thomas Luby, a mathematician, and was the widow of Henry White, whom she had married in 1878.

Bowen died on 21 February 1899 in Brighton in Sussex, aged 77 years old. He died from bronchitis after a short illness of two days. He was buried on 25 February 1899 in Kensal Green cemetery in London.

== Legacy ==
The following were named after George Bowen:

- Bowen, a town in Queensland
- Bowen Hills, a suburb of Brisbane, Queensland
- Bowen Square, a pleasure garden, opposite the heritage building of AfrAsia Bank, right in the city centre of Port Louis, Mauritius
- Bowen Park, a pleasure garden in Bowen Hills
- Bowen Downs Station, a pastoral lease in outback Queensland
- Bowen Bridge and Bowen Bridge Road, a bridge and the road that crosses it, in Brisbane, Queensland
- Bowen Terrace (and Lower Bowen Terrace), a road in the Brisbane suburb of New Farm
- Bowen Road, Bowen Drive, and Bowen Aqueduct in Hong Kong.
- Bowen Street (now part of the RMIT campus) in Melbourne.
- Bowen Street in Wellington, New Zealand.

Queen Victoria issued the Letters Patent and the accompanying Order-in-Council that are Queensland's primary founding documents on 6 June 1859. The Letters Patent specifically appointed Sir George Ferguson Bowen as Captain-General and Governor-in-Chief of Queensland, endowing him with the legal authority to oversee the installation of self-government by and for the citizens of the colony. This document was #1 in the 'Top 150: Documenting Queensland' exhibition when it toured to venues around Queensland from February 2009 to April 2010. The exhibition was part of Queensland State Archives' events and exhibition program which contributed to the state's Q150 celebrations, marking the 150th anniversary of the separation of Queensland from New South Wales.

His wife Diamantina appears to have been more popular than George in Queensland, as there are many Queensland places named after her.

Several objects connected to Bowen are held in the collections of the State Library of Queensland, including his ceremonial sword, an 1865 sterling silver ceremonial spade presented to Bowen during turning of the first sod of the first section of the Queensland Northern Railway and an 1882 pastel portrait by artist Henry Gordon Fanner.

== Honours ==
- CMG, 1855
- KCMG, 1856
- GCMG, 1860
- Privy Counsellor, 1886
- Honorary DCL Degree, Oxford, 1875
- Honorary LLD Degree, Cambridge, 1886.

== Literary works ==
- Ithaca in 1850, (London, 1851 translated into Greek in 1859)
- Mount Athos, Thessaly and Epirus (London, 1852);
- Handbook for Travellers in Greece contributor (London, 1854).
- Thirty Years of Colonial Government (London, 1889, edited by s. Lane-Poole)

== See also ==
- Diamantina Bowen

== More References ==
- Dictionary of Australian Biography – Project Gutenberg
- The Arrival & Reception of His Excellency Sir G.F. Bowen, First Governor of Queensland, Moreton Bay Courier, Tuesday 13 December 1859, page 2
- Departure of Governor Sir G.F. Bowen, The Brisbane Courier, Monday 6 January 1868, page 2
- Reception of Sir G.F. Bowen in New Zealand, The Brisbane Courier, Tuesday 3 March 1868, page 3
- Farewell Ball to the Governor, Waikato Times, Volume III, Issue 135, 20 March 1873, Page 2
- Death of Sir George Bowen, Brisbane Courier, Thursday 23 February 1899
- The Late Sir George Bowen, Brisbane Courier, Monday 27 February 1899
- Death of Sir George Bowen, Wanganui Herald, Volume XXXIII, Issue 9676, 23 February 1899, Page 2
- Queensland's first Governor, John Oxley Library Blog, State Library of Queensland.
- Handbook for travellers in Greece at GoogleBooks.

Government offices
New office	Governor of Queensland; 1859–1867	Succeeded by Sir Samuel Blackall
Preceded by Sir George Grey	Governor of New Zealand; 1867–1872	Succeeded by Sir James Fergusson
Preceded by Sir John Manners-Sutton	Governor of Victoria; 1873–1879	Succeeded by The Marquess of Normanby
Preceded by Sir Arthur Purves Phayre	Governor of Mauritius; 1879–1880	Succeeded by Sir Frederick Napier Broome
Preceded by William H. Marsh (Administrator)	9th Governor of Hong Kong; 1883–1885	Succeeded by William H. Marsh (Administrator)
