= Buttolph =

Buttolph is a surname. Notable people with the surname include:

- David Buttolph (1902–1983), American film composer
- Frank E. Buttolph (born Frances Editha Buttles; c. 1844–1924), American menu collector
- Thomas Buttolph, Anglican priest in Ireland

== Other ==
- Buttolph–Williams House, museum in Wethersfield, Connecticut, US
