= HRC Culinary Academy =

Culinary school in Sofia, Bulgaria

Coordinates: 42°42′07″N 23°19′17″E

HRC Culinary Academy is an accredited culinary school in Sofia, Bulgaria. Founded in February 2008, the academy has trained more than 800 students from 18 nations. HRC Culinary Academy is the first culinary school in Eastern Europe.

== Curriculum ==
The Academy's Culinary Arts program is a two-year course that prepares students for careers in the international hotel and culinary industry. The course focuses on hands-on training. The HRC Culinary Academy program covers a curriculum from knife skills and sauce-making to budgeting and menu engineering. Classes are taught by international chef instructors and guest chefs from around the world. The instruction language at the HRC Culinary Academy is English.

Students at the academy have the opportunity to work in restaurant or hotel kitchens during their two paid industry placements in Europe and the United States.

== Campus ==
HRC Academy facilities include training kitchens, a fine dining restaurant, demonstration theatre, culinary library and a campus hotel.
