= Thomas Buttolph =

Anglican priest

Thomas Buttolph was an Anglican priest in Ireland.

He was educated at Corpus Christi College, Cambridge. Buttolph was ordained priest on 1 December 1623. He was Dean of Raphoe from 1671 until his death five years later. There is a monument to him in St Patrick's Cathedral, Dublin.

Preceded by Ezekiel Hopkins	Dean of Raphoe; 1671–1676	Succeeded by Capel Wiseman
