= Edward Bowen (priest) =

Irish Anglican priest

Edward Bowen (20 March 1828, near Newtowncunningham in the Parish of Taughboyne – 28 July 1897, in London) was an Anglican priest in Ireland during the nineteenth century.

Bowen was educated at University College, Oxford. He was ordained deacon in 1881 and priest in 1852. After a curacy at Taughboyne he held incumbencies at Baronscourt and Taughboyne. He was Dean of Raphoe from 1882 until his death. His brother was Sir George Bowen.

Preceded by John Gwynn	Dean of Raphoe; 1882–1897	Succeeded by Michael Bell Cox
