= Menu pricing =

Menu pricing may refer to:

- the pricing of menus
- product versioning, a form of price differentiation
