= Nathanael Wilson =

English Anglican priest

Nathanael Wilson (died 3 November 1695) was a 17th-century English Anglican priest in Ireland.

Wilson was educated at Magdalen Hall, Oxford. He was Chaplain to James Butler, 1st Duke of Ormonde, Lord Lieutenant of Ireland before being appointed Dean of Raphoe in 1684. He was Bishop of Limerick, Ardfert and Aghadoe from 1692 until his death on 3 November 1695.

Church of Ireland titles
Preceded by Capel Wiseman	Dean of Raphoe; 1684–1692	Succeeded by John Trench
Preceded by Simon Digby	Bishop of Limerick, Ardfert and Aghadoe; 1692–1695	Succeeded by Thomas Smyth
