= Albert Cunningham =

Anglo-Irish army officer

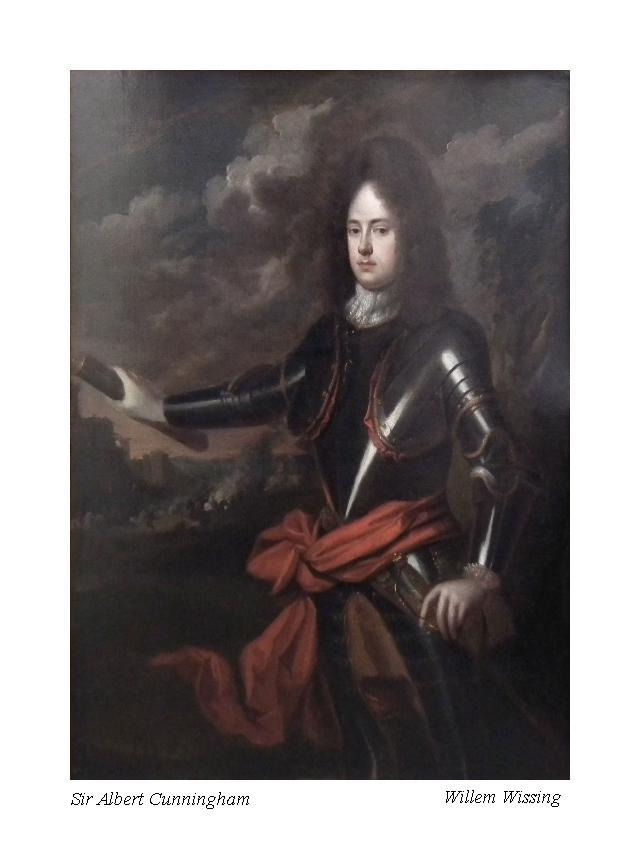
- A portrait of Cunningham by Willem Wissing
- Born: Ireland
- Died: 5 September 1691; County Sligo, Ireland
- Military career
- Allegiance: Williamites
- Rank: Colonel
- Commands: Cunningham's Dragoons
- Conflicts: Williamite War in Ireland

Colonel Sir Albert Cunningham (died 5 September 1691) was an Ulster Scots army officer who fought in the Williamite War in Ireland. He was one of the twenty-seven children of Alexander Cunningham, Dean of Raphoe, who emigrated to Ireland from Scotland, and Marian Murray, daughter of John Murray of Broughton, Edinburgh. He married Margaret Leslie, daughter of Henry Leslie, Bishop of Meath, and Jane Swinton, and had one son, Henry.

Cunningham became Lieutenant-General of the Ordnance in Ireland in 1660. He stood down from that role in 1687 and went on to raise Cunningham's Dragoons in 1689. He fought on the side of Prince William of Orange at the Battle of the Boyne in July 1690 and the Siege of Limerick in August 1691. He was murdered while being held as a prisoner of war near Collooney in County Sligo on 5 September 1691.

A portrait of Cunningham is at Springhill House.
