= John Albright =

Irish Anglican priest

John Albright was an Anglican priest in Ireland during the late 16th and early 17th centuries.

Albright was educated at Magdalene College, Cambridge. He became the Vicar choral of Christ Church Cathedral, Dublin in 1595; and a prebendary in 1600. He was Dean of Raphoe from 1603 until his death in 1609.
