= Stephen White (priest) =

Irish Anglican priest, theologian and author

Stephen Ross White (1958–2024) was a retired senior Anglican priest, theologian and author.

Dr White was educated at Queen's University Belfast, Hull University and Ripon College Cuddesdon. He was ordained in 1986 and began his ecclesiastical career as a curate in Redcar. He was the incumbent at Gweedore from 1988 until 1992; Dean of Raphoe from 1992 until 2002; and Dean of Killaloe from 2002 until 2012. Between 2011 and 2012 he was Chancellor of Saint Patrick's Cathedral, Dublin, the National Cathedral of the Church of Ireland.

From 2012 until his retirement in 2019 Dr White was Priest in charge of Dunsfold and Hascombe.

Dr White was married, with two adult sons.
