= Archibald Adair =

Irish Anglican bishop

Archibald Adair (died 1647) was a 17th-century Irish Anglican bishop.

Adair was Dean of Raphoe from 1622 to 1630, when he became Bishop of Killala and Achonry. He was nominated on 23 November 1629 and consecrated 9 May the following year. Deprived on 18 May 1640 (subsequently set aside), he was translated to Waterford and Lismore on 13 July 1641. He died in 1647.

Church of Ireland titles
Preceded by Phelim O'Doghertie	Dean of Raphoe; 1622–1630	Succeeded by Alexander Cunningham
Preceded by Archibald Hamilton	Bishop of Killala and Achonry; 1630–1640	Succeeded by John Maxwell
Preceded by John Atherton	Bishop of Waterford and Lismore; 1641–1647	Succeeded by See vacant
