= Menu hack =

Secret restaurant menu option

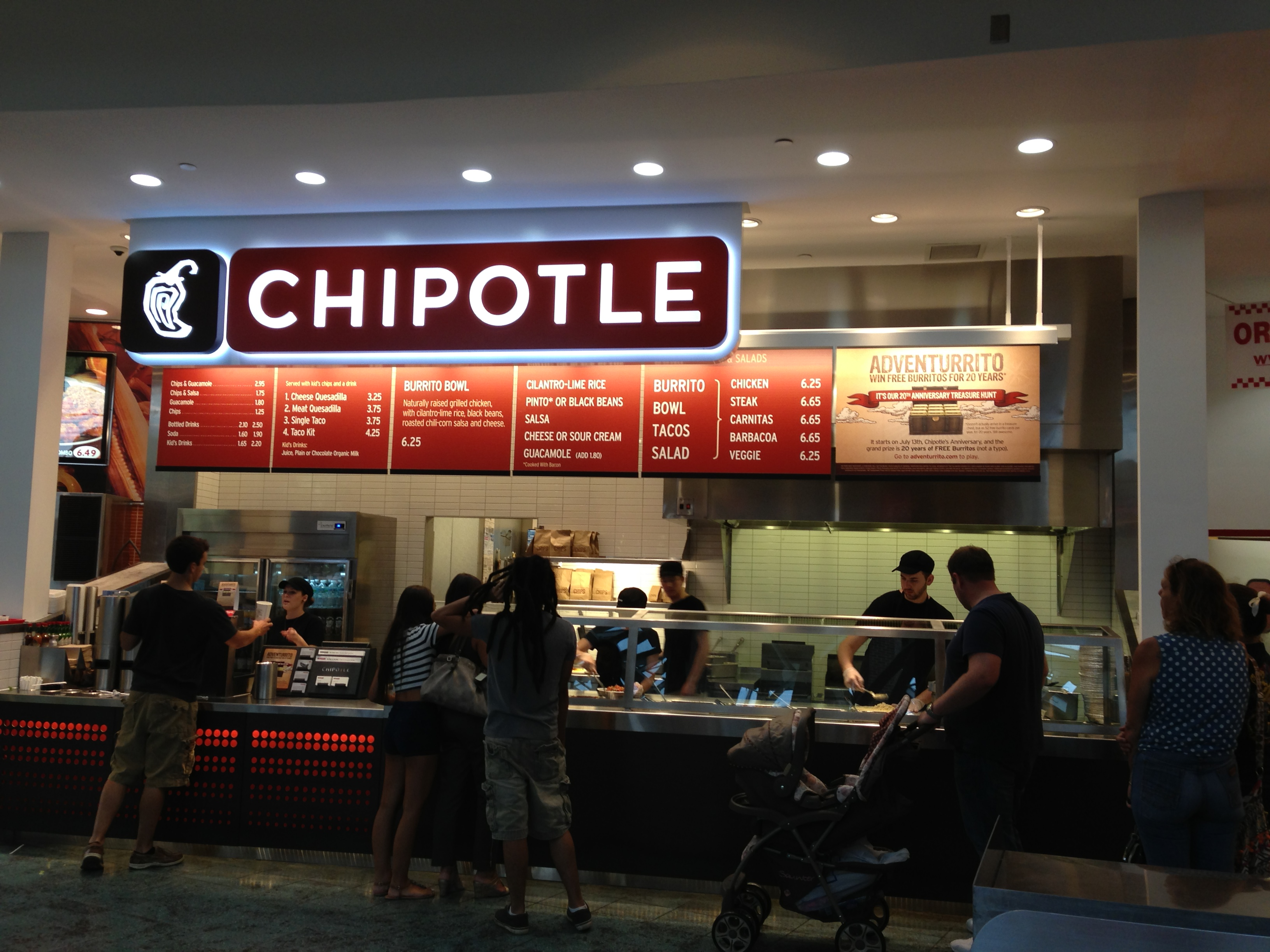
The menu of a Chipotle restaurant, a chain known for menu hacks

A menu hack is a non-standard method of ordering food, usually at fast-food or fast casual restaurants, that offers a different result than what is explicitly stated on a menu. Menu hacks may range from a simple alternate flavor to "gaming the system" in order to obtain more food than normal. They are often spread on social media platforms such as TikTok, and are more popular with Generation Z, which has been known to customize their orders more than previous generations. Hacks are sometimes officially added to the menu after their popularity grows. However, in some cases, they have been criticized for overburdening fast food employees with outlandish requests, sparking debate as to whether certain menu hacks are unethical.

The list of all possible menu hacks is called a secret menu.

== History ==
The term "menu hack" stems from hacker culture and its tradition of overcoming previously imposed limitations. However, the tradition of ordering from a secret menu dates back to the early days of fast food. "Animal style" fries, a word of mouth menu item ordered from In-N-Out since the 1960s, was rumored to have been created by local surfers. In the Information Age, the rise of social media gave influencers the ability to communicate unique food combinations to their followers, which proved to go viral easily. Design mistakes in food ordering apps also proved to be easily exploitable. In some cases, these hacks boosted the profile of brands on social media, while in others, they caused financial harm when the company was unprepared to handle the sudden influx of unusual orders.

One restaurant chain notable for the phenomenon is Chipotle Mexican Grill. A viral hack from Alexis Frost, suggesting a quesadilla with fajita vegetables inside, dipped in Chipotle vinaigrette mixed with sour cream, obtained 1.9 million views on TikTok, overloading the chain's workers, who had to work harder to prepare more vegetables and vinaigrette. Some restaurants began to deny the dish to customers, forcing them to only order meat and cheese on quesadillas. The company ultimately left the dish on the menu, but urged customers to stop ordering it via social media. When it later officially added the Fajita Quesadilla to the menu, digital sales nearly doubled. A method to order nachos, which are not officially on the menu, was also noted by customers.

Starbucks is also famous for menu hacks, including the Pink Drink, a "Barbiecore" beverage in which coconut milk replaced the water in the strawberry açaí refresher. After it went viral, the company made it a permanent menu item and distributed it bottled in grocery stores.

== Controversy ==
Menu hacks have been subject to a growing backlash, with employees stating that they "dread" younger customers due to the proliferation of unusual orders. Service industry workers, already overworked and underpaid, have called the rise of menu hacks and their difficulty to make an additional reason to unionize and demand higher wages.

== See also ==
- Fad diet
- Life hack
