= Thomas Bray (canon) =

British Anglican priest (1706–1785)

Thomas Bray DD (21 March 1706 – 28 March 1785) was a Canon of Windsor from 1776 to 1785.

== Family ==
He was the son of Nicholas Bray of Stratton, Cornwall.

== Career ==
Bray matriculated in 17726 at Exeter College, Oxford, graduating BA in 1729, MA in 1732, BD in 1743, and DD in 1758. He became a Fellow of the college in 1731.

In the 1754 British election, Bray took an active part in the Oxfordshire campaigh. It resulted in Lord Macclesfield appointing him to the Rectory of Bixband. He went on to be appointed

- Rector of Exeter College, Oxford 1771–1785
- Dean of Raphoe 1777
- Rector of Dunsfold 1776

He was appointed to the third stall in St George's Chapel, Windsor Castle in 1776, a position he held until 1785.
