= John Hay (priest) =

Northern Irish anglican priest

John Hay (b 1945) was Dean of Raphoe from 2003 to 2013.

Hay was educated at the Church of Ireland Theological Institute and ordained in 1980. He began his ecclesiastical career as a curate in Newtownards. He was the incumbent at Fintona from 1989 until his time as Dean.
