= Menu =

List of food and beverages offered by a restaurant

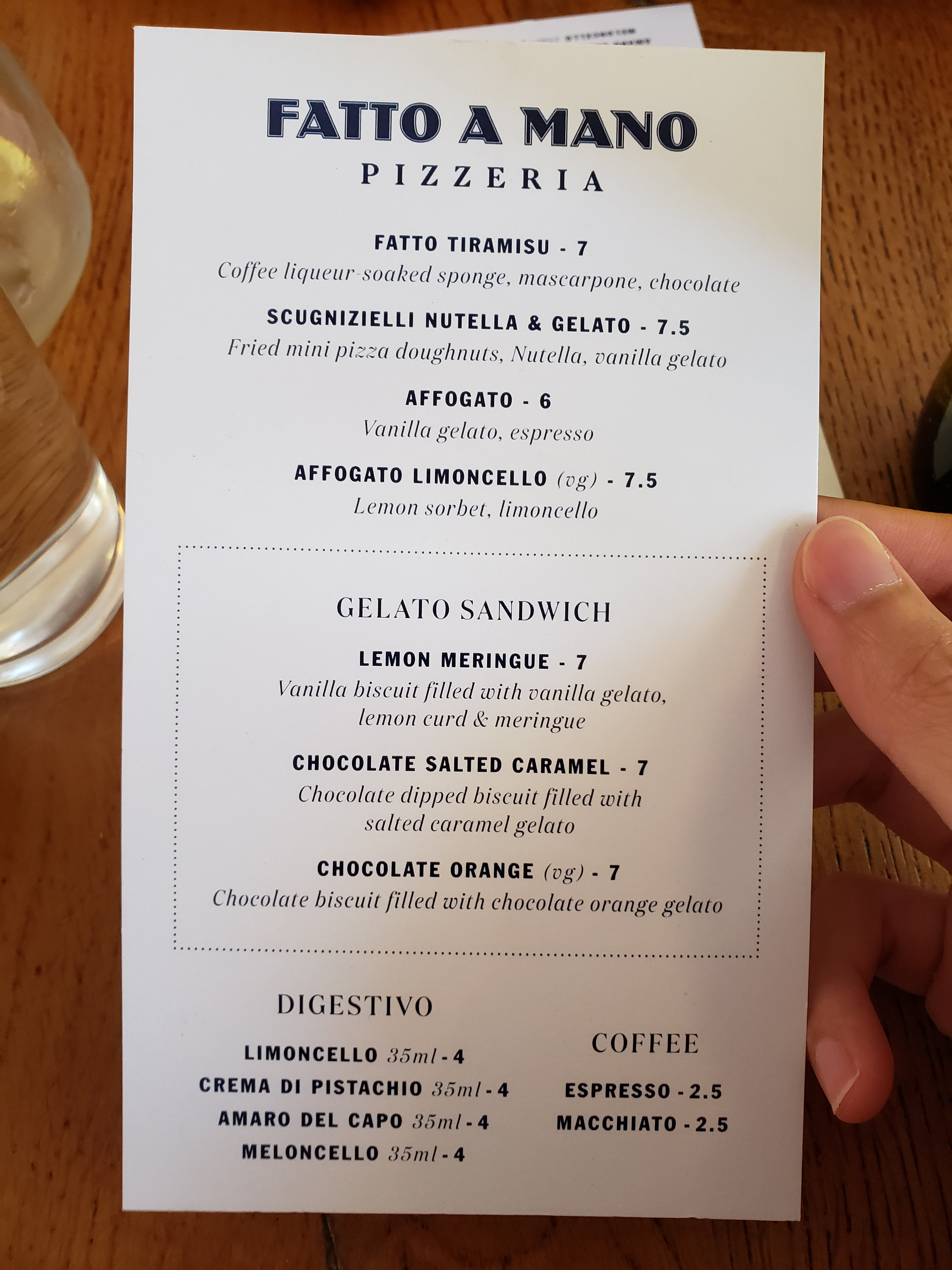
Menu showing a list of desserts in a pizzeria

In a restaurant, a menu is a list of food and beverage items available for customers to order. Menus may be presented à la carte, in which individual dishes are listed separately and priced individually, or as table d'hôte, where a fixed sequence of courses is offered for a set price.

Menus can be displayed in several formats. They are commonly printed on paper and provided to diners at the table, but may also appear on display boards inside the establishment, outside the restaurant to attract passersby, or on digital screens. Since the late 1990s, many restaurants have also made their menus available online.

Menus are also used at formal events outside restaurants, such as weddings, banquets, and ceremonial dinners. During the 19th and early 20th centuries, printed menus were frequently produced for private dinner parties and social gatherings in homes, which was one of the earliest uses of printed menus in Europe.

== History ==
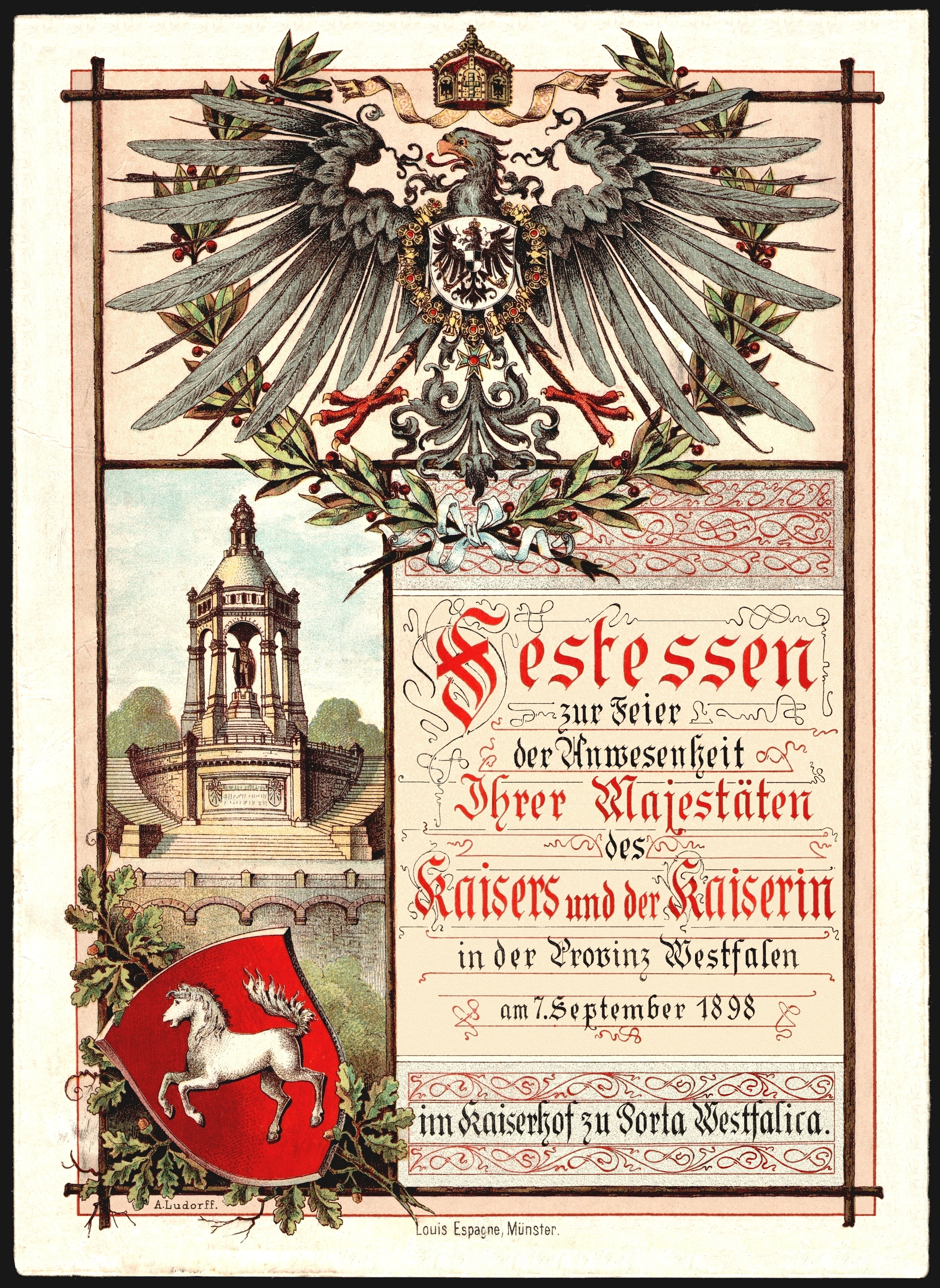
Historical menu card of the banquet for German Emperor Wilhelm II and Empress Auguste Viktoria on September 7, 1898, at the Hotel Kaiserhof, Porta Westfalica

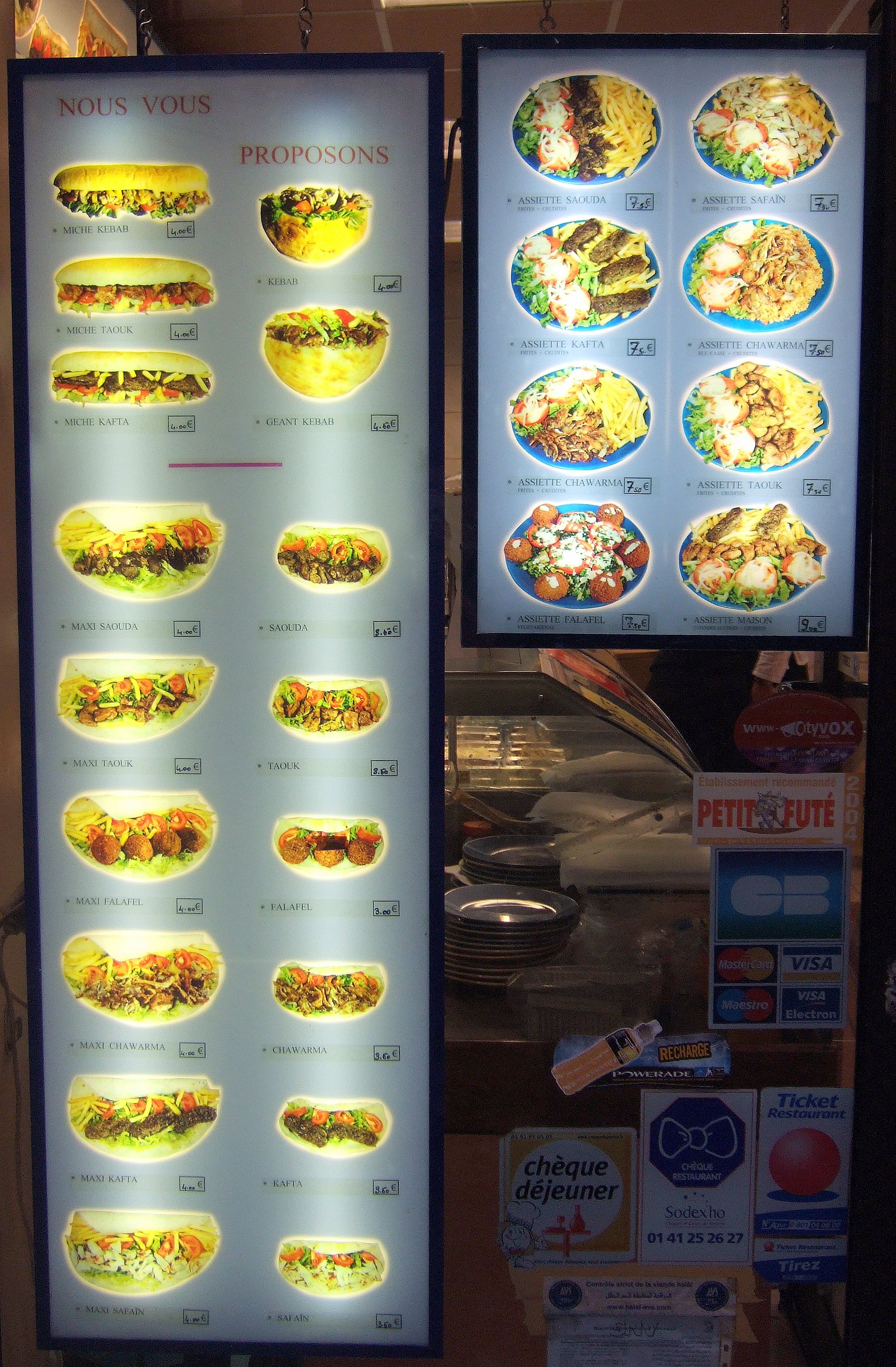
A lighted display board-style menu outside a French Kebab restaurant.

Menus, as lists of prepared foods, have been discovered dating back to the Song dynasty in China. In the larger cities of the time, merchants found a way to cater to busy customers who had little time or energy to prepare an evening meal. The variation in Chinese cuisine from different regions led caterers to create a list or menu for their patrons.

The word "menu", like much of the terminology of cuisine, is French in origin. It ultimately derives from Latin "minutus", something made small; in French, it came to be applied to a detailed list or résumé of any kind. The original menus that offered consumers choices were prepared on a small chalkboard, in French a carte; so foods chosen from a bill of fare are described as "à la carte", "according to the board".

The earliest European menus, several of which survive from 1751 onwards, appear to have been for the relatively intimate and informal soupers intimes ("intimate suppers") given by King Louis XV at the Château de Choisy for between 31 and 36 guests. Several seem to have been placed on the table, listing four courses, each with several dishes, plus dessert.

During the second half of the 18th century, and especially after the French Revolution in 1789, they spread to restaurants. Before then, eating establishments or tables d'hôte served dishes chosen by the chef or proprietors. Customers ate what the house was serving that day, as in contemporary banquets or buffets, and meals were served from a common table. The establishment of restaurants and restaurant menus allowed customers to choose from a list of unseen dishes, which were produced to order according to the customer's selection. A table d'hôte establishment charged its customers a fixed price; the menu allowed customers to spend as much or as little money as they chose.

The Culinary Institute of the Americas has been collecting menus from thousands of restaurants and making them accessible online. The menus range from 1855 to the present day. From these menus, the history of menu design, culinary choices, and pricing are able to be evaluated and show changes in restaurants and dining practices over the year. There are many noteworthy menus featured in the collection, such as the menu from John F. Kennedy's birthday dinner in 1962 and the celebratory dinner for the Apollo 11 astronauts. The New York Public Library's menu collection, The Buttolph Collection of Menus, features restaurant menus, with most of the collection dated between the years 1890 and 1910. The collection was started by Frank E. Buttolph, a collector "whose mission in life was to collect menus." She donated her collection to the New York Public Library in 1899 and continued contributing until her death in 1924. While the majority of the collection is from American restaurants, there are selections of menus from Europe, Asia, and South America.

=== Price-less ===
Menus for private functions, pre-paid meals and the like do not have prices. In normal restaurants, there are two types of menus without prices that were mostly used until the 1970s and 1980s: the "blind menu" and the "women's menu". These menus contained all of the same items as the regular menu, except that the prices were not listed. The "blind menu" was distributed to guests at business meals where the hosts did not want the diners to see the prices, or to any type of dinner where the host felt that having the prices not listed would make the guests feel more comfortable ordering.

Until the early 1980s, some high-end restaurants had two menus divided by gender: a regular menu with the prices listed for men and a second menu for women, which did not have the prices listed (it was called the "ladies' menu"), so that the female diner would not know the prices of the items. In 1980, Kathleen Bick took a male business partner out to dinner at L'Orangerie in West Hollywood; after Bick got a women's menu without prices and her guest got the menu with prices, Bick hired lawyer Gloria Allred to file a discrimination lawsuit, on the grounds that the women's menu went against the California Civil Rights Act. Bick stated that getting a women's menu without prices left her feeling "humiliated and incensed". The owners of the restaurant defended the practice, saying it was done as a courtesy, like the way men would stand up when a woman enters the room. Even though the lawsuit was dropped, the restaurant ended its gender-based menu policy. While price-less menus for women generally disappeared after the 1980s, in 2010, restaurant critic Tracey MacLeod reported that Le Gavroche in London, England, still had a price-less women's menu for women who ate at tables booked by men, with tables booked by women getting regular menus.

== Economics of menu production ==
As early as the mid-20th century, some restaurants have relied on "menu specialists" to design and print their menus. Prior to the emergence of digital printing, these niche printing companies printed full-color menus on offset presses. The economics of full-color offset made it impractical to print short press runs. The solution was to print a "menu shell" with everything but the prices. The prices would later be printed on a less costly black-only press. In a typical order, the printer might produce 600 menu shells, then finish and laminate 150 menus with prices. When the restaurant needed to reorder, the printer would add prices and laminate some of the remaining shells.

With the advent of digital presses, it became practical in the 1990s to print full-color menus affordably in short press runs, sometimes as few as 25 menus. Because of limits on sheet size, larger laminated menus were impractical for single-location independent restaurants to produce press runs of as few as 300 menus, but some restaurants may want to place far fewer menus into service. Some menu printers continue to use shells. The disadvantage for the restaurant is that it is unable to update anything but prices without creating a new shell.

During the economic crisis in the 1970s, many restaurants found it costly to reprint the menu as inflation caused prices to increase. Economists noted this, and it has become part of economic theory, under the term "menu costs". In general, such "menu costs" may be incurred by a range of businesses, not just restaurants; for example, during a period of inflation, any company that prints catalogs or product price lists will have to reprint these items with new price figures.

To avoid having to reprint the menus throughout the year as prices changed, some restaurants began to display their menus on chalkboards, with the menu items and prices written in chalk. This way, the restaurant could easily modify the prices without going to the expense of reprinting the paper menus. A similar tactic continued to be used in the 2000s with certain items that are sensitive to changing supply, fuel costs, and so on: the use of the term "market price" or "Please ask the server" instead of stating the price. This allows restaurants to modify the price of lobster, fresh fish and other foods subject to rapid changes in cost.

The latest trend in menus is to display them on handheld tablets; customers can browse through these and look at the photographs of the dishes.

== Writing style ==
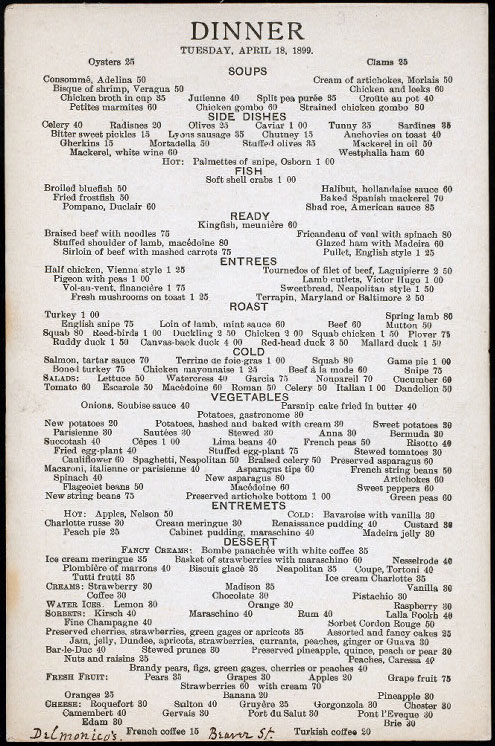
An 1899 menu from Delmonico's restaurant in New York City, which called some of its selections entremets, and contained barely English descriptions such as "plombière of marrons".

The main categories within a typical menu in the US are appetizers, "side orders and à la carte", entrées, desserts and beverages. Sides and à la carte may include such items as soups, salads, and dips. There may be special age-restricted sections for "seniors" or for children, presenting smaller portions at lower prices. Any of these sections may be pulled out as a separate menu, such as desserts and/or beverages, or a wine list. A children's menu (in Japan, "Okosama lunch") may also be presented as a placemat with games and puzzles, to help keep children entertained.

Menus can provide other useful information to diners. Some menus describe the chef's or proprietor's food philosophy, the chef's résumé (British: CV), or the mission statement of the restaurant. Menus often present a restaurant's policies about ID checks for alcohol, lost items, or gratuities for larger parties. In the United States, county health departments frequently require restaurants to include health warnings about raw or undercooked meat, poultry, eggs, and seafood.

=== Puffery ===
As a form of advertising, the prose found on printed menus is famous for the degree of its puffery. Menus frequently emphasize the processes used to prepare foods, call attention to exotic ingredients, and add French or other foreign language expressions to make the dishes appear sophisticated and exotic. Slate describes the use of foreign languages in menus as, "plopping in foreign words (80 percent of them French) like 'spring mushroom civet,' 'plin of rabbit,' 'orange-jaggery gastrique.' Part of the function of menu prose is to impress customers with the notion that the dishes are so complex that the diners could not prepare similar foods at home.

== Types ==
=== Paper ===
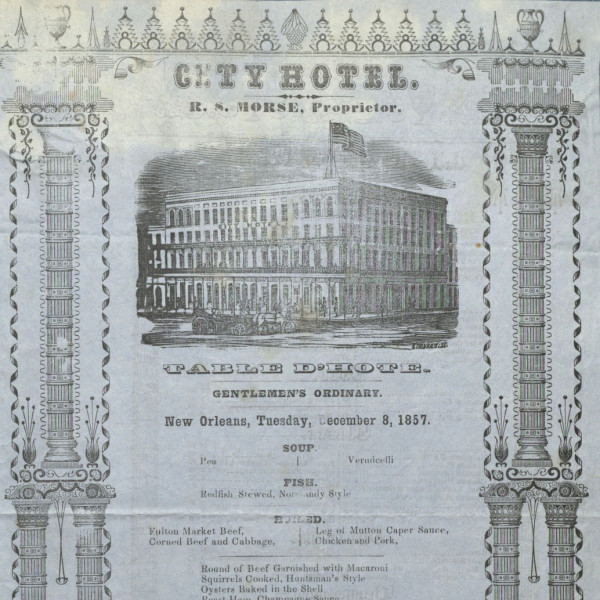
City Hotel, New Orleans restaurant menu (December 8, 1857)

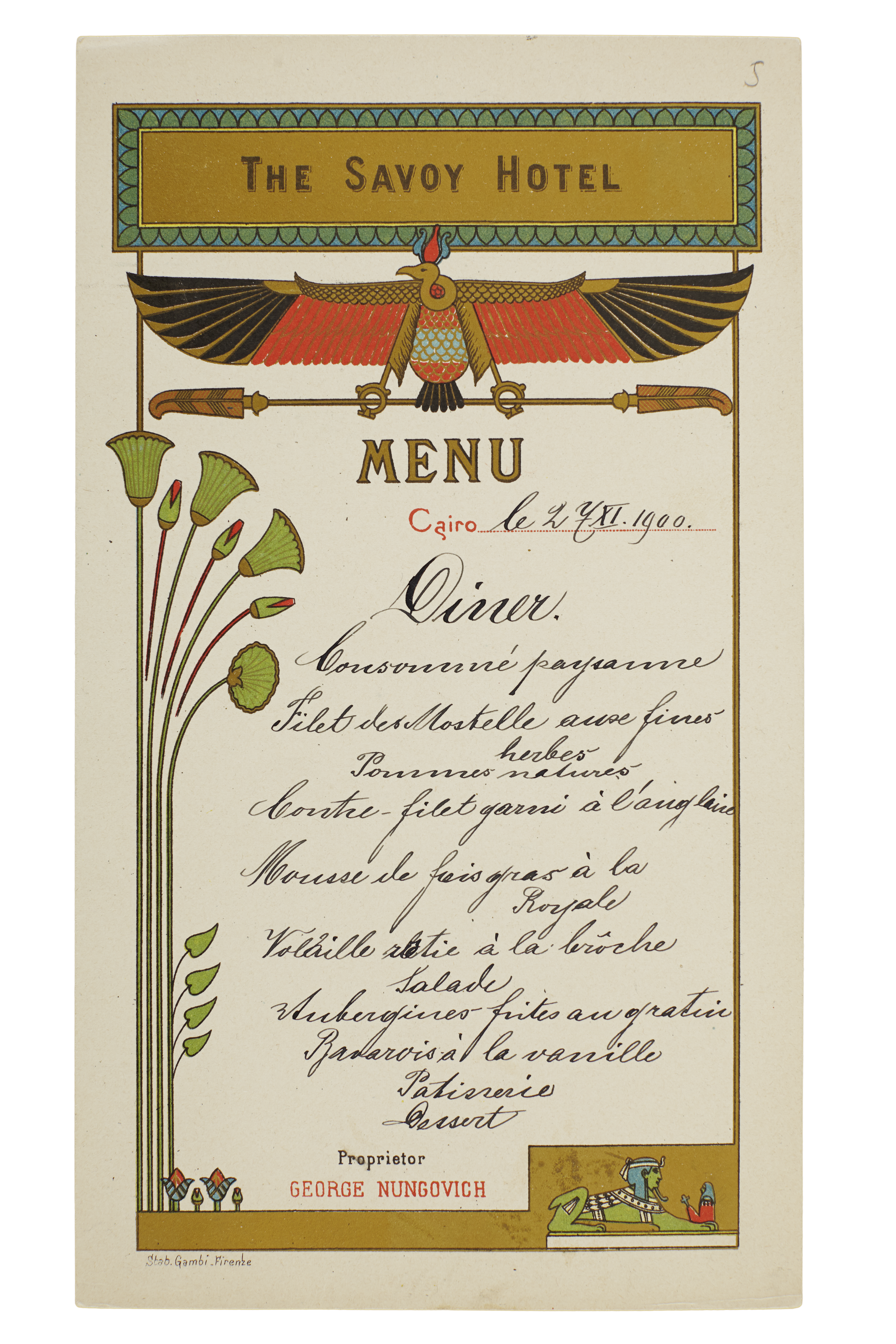
Savoy Hotel in Cairo, menu from 1900.

Menus vary in length and detail depending on the type of restaurant. The simplest hand-held menus are printed on a single sheet of paper, though menus with multiple pages or "views" are common. In some cafeteria-style restaurants and chain restaurants, a single-page menu may double as a disposable placemat. To protect a menu from spills and wear, it may be protected by heat-sealed vinyl page protectors, lamination or menu covers. Restaurants consider their positioning in the marketplace (e.g. fine dining, fast food, informal) in deciding which style of menu to use.

Some restaurants use a single menu as the sole source of information about the food for customers, but in other cases, the main menu is supplemented by ancillary menus, such as:

- An appetizer menu (nachos, chips and salsa, vegetables and dip, etc.)
- A wine list
- A liquor and mixed drinks menu
- A beer list
- A dessert menu (which may also include a list of tea and coffee options)

Some restaurants use only text in their menus. In other cases, restaurants include illustrations and photos, either of the dishes or of an element of the culture which is associated with the restaurant. For instance a Lebanese kebab restaurant might decorate its menu with photos of Lebanese mountains and beaches. Particularly with the ancillary menu types, the menu may be provided in alternative formats, because these menus (other than wine lists) tend to be much shorter than food menus. For example, an appetizer menu or a dessert menu may be displayed on a folded paper table tent, a hard plastic table stand, a flipchart style wooden "table stand", or even, in the case of a pizza restaurant with a limited wine selection, a wine list glued to an empty bottle.

Take-out restaurants often leave paper menus in the lobbies and doorsteps of nearby homes as advertisements. The first to do so may have been New York City's Empire Szechuan chain, founded in 1976. The chain and other restaurants' aggressive menu distribution on the Upper West Side of Manhattan caused the "Menu Wars" of the 1990s, including invasions of Empire Szechuan by the "Menu Vigilantes", the revoking of its cafe license, several lawsuits, and physical attacks on menu distributors.

=== Menu board ===
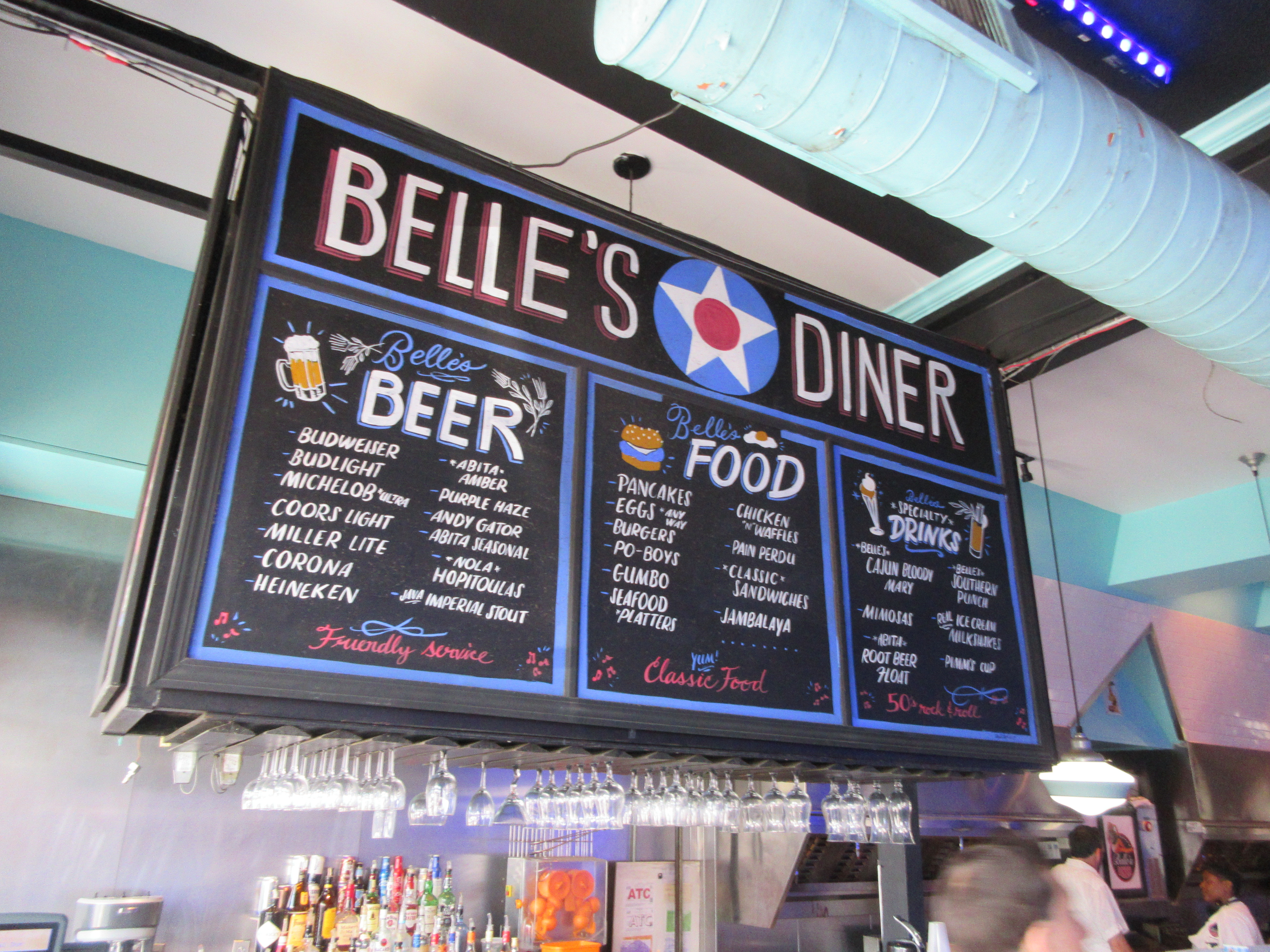
A menu board in a New Orleans diner

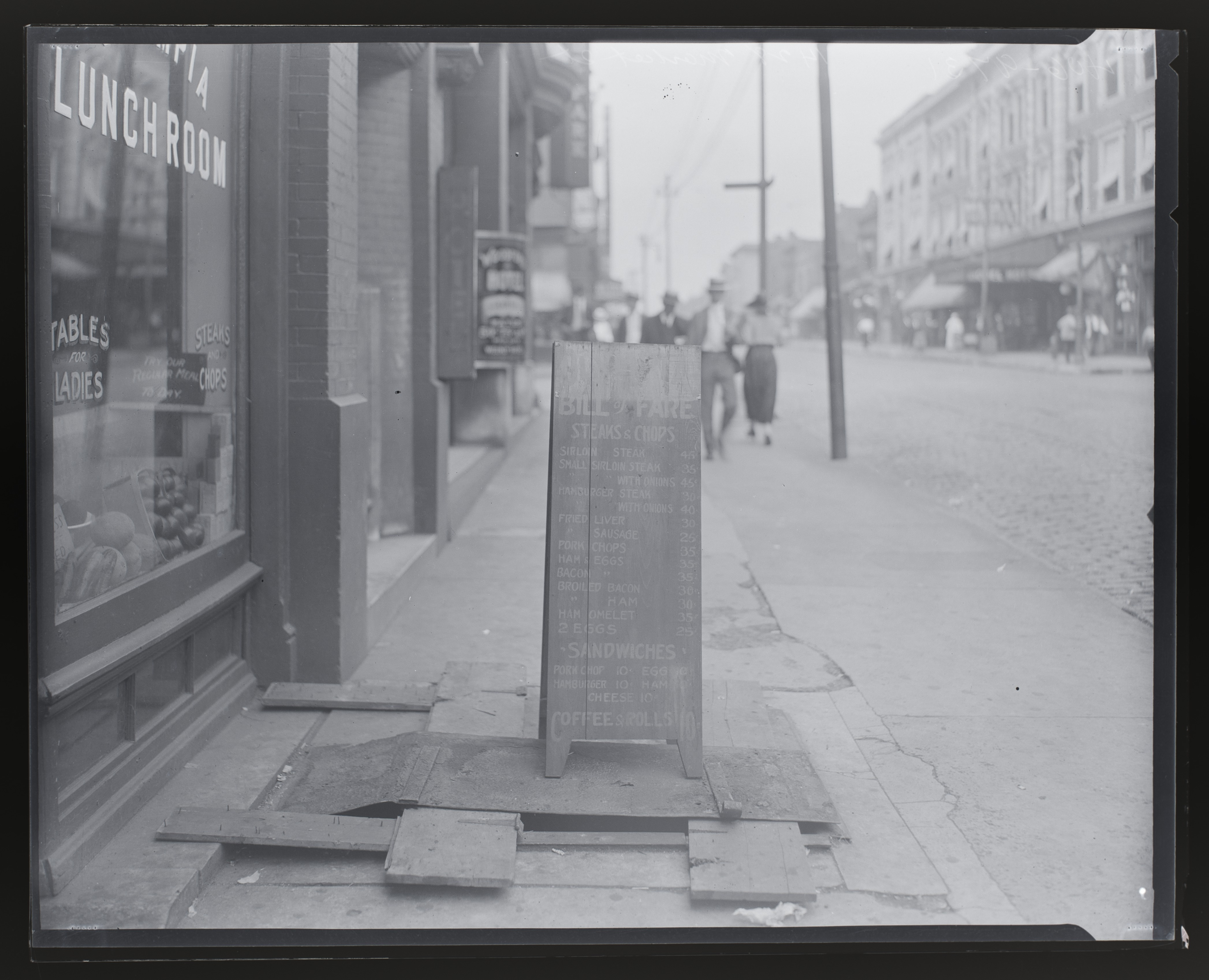
An old menu sign in front of a restaurant

Outdoor menu boards were first made in 1920s and 1930s. Back then, they were painted signs or chalkboards. In the 1960s and 1970s, there was development of backlit menu boards which were easier to use and could be seen better at night. They listed items and prices on plastic or paper in a lightbox. The signs were small and making changes required human work on the board.

In the 1980s, operators found that using photos boosted sales, but there was becoming limited space on the boards as restaurants' menus expanded. Later, during the 1990s, changing menus required manual adjustments or turning the panels around. When the 2000s came, digital menu boards were being used. Since they were digital, it expanded capabilities, increased shop revenues, and made the boards no longer have to be adjusted by hand.

Some restaurants – typically fast-food restaurants and cafeteria-style establishments – provide their menu in a large poster or display board format up high on the wall or above the service counter. This way, all of the patrons can see all of the choices, and the restaurant does not have to provide printed menus. This large format menu may also be set up outside (see the next section). The simplest large format menu boards have the menu printed or painted on a large flat board. More expensive large format menu boards include boards that have a metal housing, a translucent surface, and a backlight (which facilitates the reading of the menu in low light) and boards that have removable numbers for the prices. This enables the restaurant to change prices without having to have the board reprinted or repainted.

Some restaurants such as cafes and small eateries use a large chalkboard to display the entire menu. The advantage of using a chalkboard is that the menu items and prices can be changed; the downside is that the chalk may be hard to read in lower light or glare, and the restaurant has to have a staff member who has attractive, clear handwriting.

A high-tech successor to the chalkboard menu is the "write-on wipe-off" illuminated sign, using LED technology. The text appears in a vibrant color against a black background.

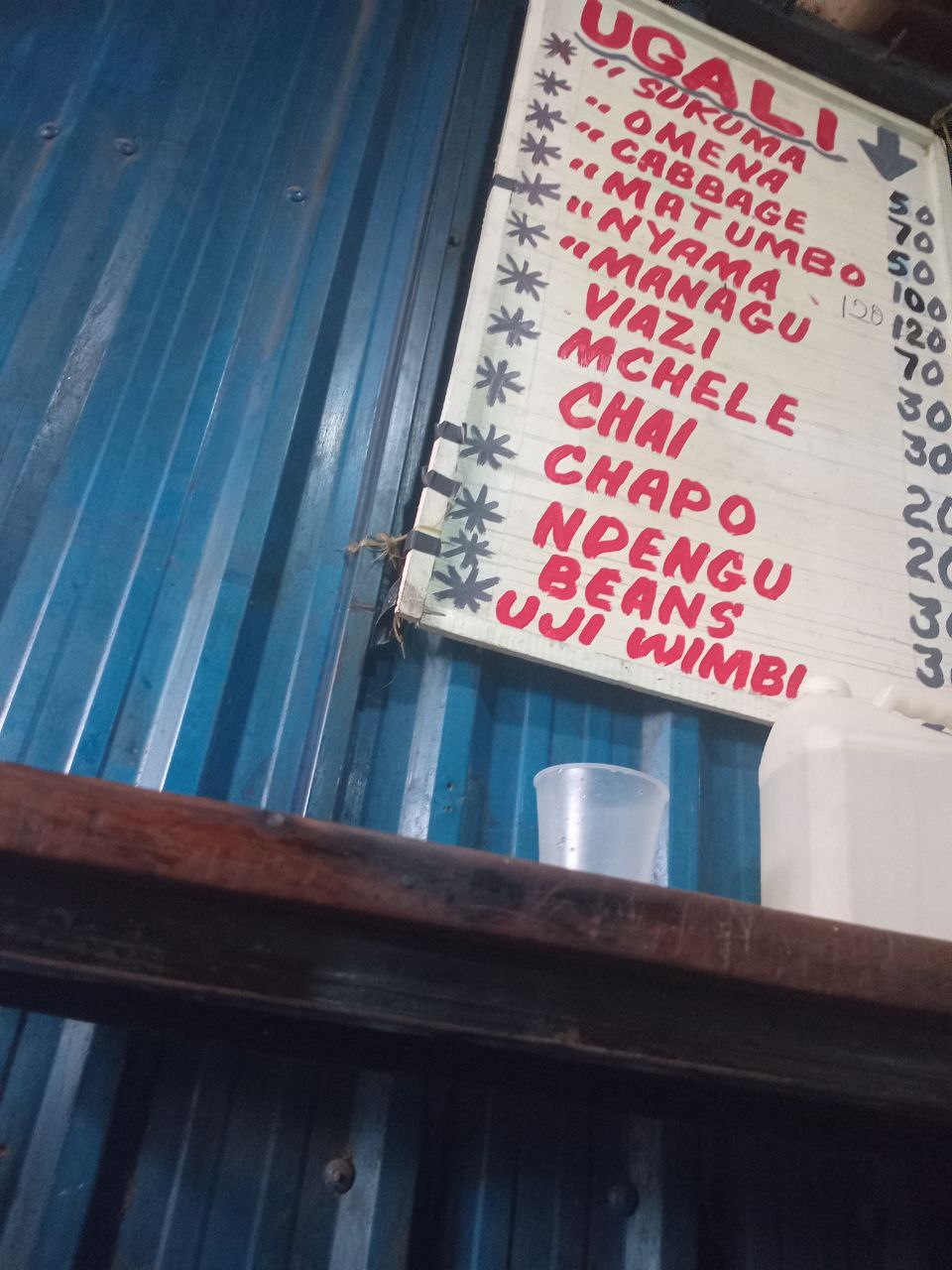
A board menu at a small inn in Kenya

=== Outdoor ===
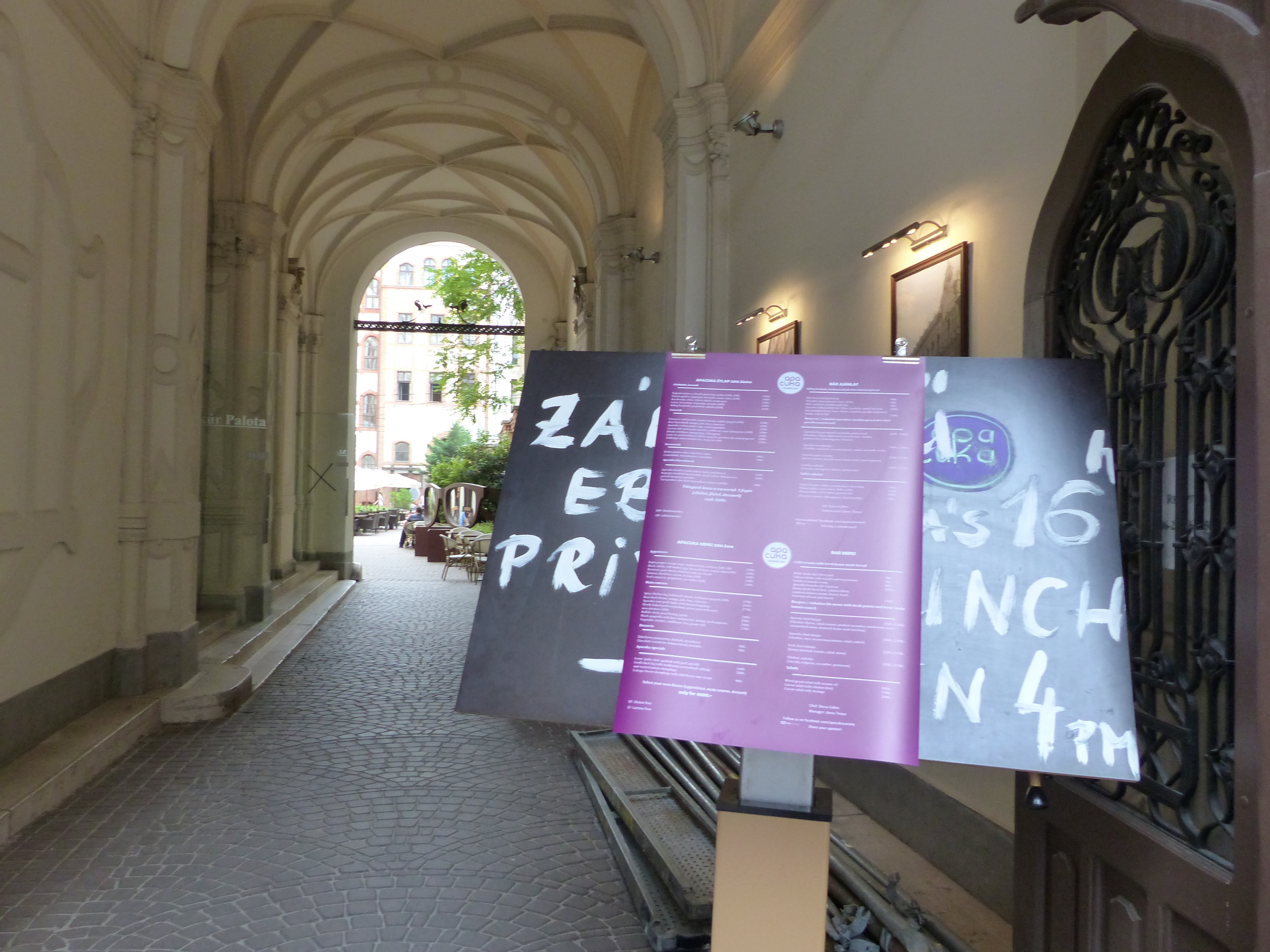
Menu cards at Apacuka, Budapest

Some restaurants provide a copy of their menu outside the restaurant. Fast-food restaurants that have a drive-through or walk-up window will often put the entire menu on a board, lit-up sign, or poster outside so that patrons can select their meal choices. High-end restaurants may also provide a copy of their menu outside the restaurant, with the pages of the menu placed in a lit-up glass display case; this way, prospective patrons can see if the menu choices are to their liking. Also, some mid-level and high-end restaurants may provide a partial indication of their menu listings–the "specials"–on a chalkboard displayed outside the restaurant. The chalkboard will typically provide a list of seasonal items or dishes that are the specialty of the chef which is only available for a few days.

==== Digital outdoor ====
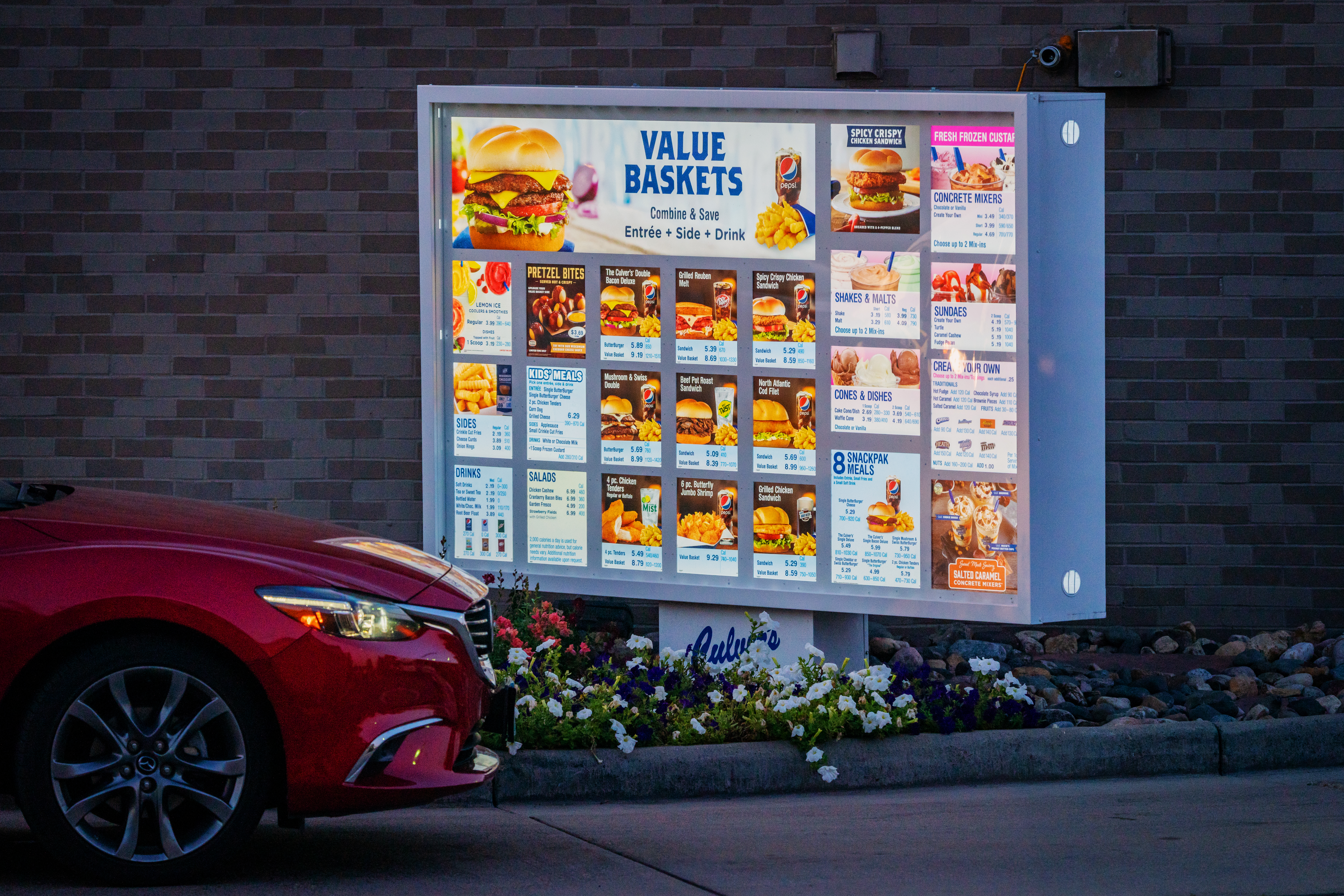
An outdoor menu board at a Culver's restaurant in Shakopee, Minnesota

A digital outdoor menu board (DOMB) is a digital menu that displays marketing information, and can be changed quickly. DOMBs present menus in ways that a static board cannot, through bright, high-resolution display. They are built to withstand diverse weather conditions. Some are protected from damage of rain, humidity, and dust.

Digital outdoor menu boards use LCD or LED screens, and have a Content Management System (CMS). They are built from materials like aluminum, steel, and High Molecular Weight Polyethylene (HMWP). They can be an average size of 43 – 55 inches. They generally have the aspect ratio of 4:3 or 16:9.

Digital outdoor menu boards can be used in drive-through pickups. Sometimes they are placed right in front of a restaurant's entrance. Passing customers can browse through the menu, learn more information about the products, and see pictures of the food. DOMBs also have become a large component to fast-food restaurants. They are used to display information for advertising menus in a high-resolution display. DOMBs are also bright, so customers can see them. DOMBs can cost US $1,500 to over $7,000 depending on their size and features. Some can be as expensive as $20,000.

The DOMB signs' displays can be changed quickly and remotely from a different location than the board. It can be done from a device that is connected to the internet. 70% of companies that use digital outdoor menu boards have been able to make back the money that the boards cost in less than 18 months from using them. The boards can help promote deals on items and support unplanned purchases from customers. Restaurants use digital outdoor drive-through menu boards to display dynamic content that can change based on factors like time of day, customer preferences, or weather conditions. They can rise the average order price by 30%, since customers are willing to buy more.

A study showed that using digital outdoor menu boards in drive-through lowered customer wait time by 15%. DOMBs also improve ordering accuracy by reducing the chance of errors and miscommunication with integrated voice recognition, even if there are ambient sounds that would normally make communication through a talking system difficult.

However, the boards can be a big investment for some companies and are expensive to repair and maintain. However, the cost of DOMBs has gone down in recent years. They can also consume large amounts of energy, while static signs don't. As technology advances, LED and LCD screens are becoming more power efficient. Ambient lights can cause the DOMBs to be harder to see. Increasing the brightness and using high-quality displays can counter these issues. Also, streaming delays can affect the way the boards look, making them appear to be lower quality. Because of this, using DOMBs sometimes requires good internet access.

=== Digital displays ===
With the invention of LCD and Plasma displays, some menus have moved from a static printed model to one which can change dynamically. By using a flat LCD screen and a computer server, menus can be digitally displayed allowing moving images, animated effects and the ability to edit details and prices.

For fast food restaurants, a benefit is the ability to update prices and menu items as frequently as needed, across an entire chain. Digital menu boards also allow restaurant owners to control the day parting of their menus, converting from a breakfast menu in the late morning. Some platforms support the ability allow local operators to control their own pricing while the design aesthetic is controlled by the corporate entity. Various software tools and hardware developments have been created for the specific purpose of managing a digital menu board system. Digital menu screens can also alternate between displaying the full menu and showing video commercials to promote specific dishes or menu items.

=== Online menu ===
Websites featuring online restaurant menus have been on the Internet for nearly a decade. In recent years, however, more and more restaurants outside of large metropolitan areas have been able to feature their menus online as a result of this trend.

Several restaurant-owned and startup online food ordering websites already included menus on their websites, yet due to the limitations of which restaurants could handle online orders, many restaurants were left invisible to the Internet aside from an address listing. Multiple companies came up with the idea of posting menus online simultaneously, and it is difficult to ascertain who was first. Menus and online food ordering have been available online since at least 1997. Since 1997, hundreds of online restaurant menu web sites have appeared on the Internet. Some sites are city-specific, some list by region, state or province.

=== Secret menu ===
Another phenomenon is the so-called secret menu where some fast food restaurants are known for having unofficial and unadvertised selections that customers learn by word of mouth, or by looking them up online. Fast food restaurants will often prepare variations on items already available, but to have them all on the menu would create clutter. This can also occur in high-end restaurants, which may be willing to prepare certain items which are not listed on the menu (e.g., dishes that have long been favorites of regular clientele). Sometimes restaurants may name foods often ordered by regular clientele after them, for either convenience or prestige. At some fast food restaurants, "secret menu" items exist which were once part of the regular menu but are no longer advertised. These items may still be rung up as a regular menu item, and are assembled from ingredients that are still in use in other menu items.

== See also ==
- Menu engineering

== Literature ==
- Jim Heimann (ed.): Menu Design in America: 1850-1985, English/German/French. Taschen, Köln, Germany 2011. ISBN 978-3-8365-2662-3
