= Alexander Cunningham (priest) =

Scottish Anglican priest in Ireland

Alexander Cunningham (died 3 September 1660) was a 17th-century Scottish Anglican priest in Ireland.

Cunningham was born in Scotland. He held livings at Inver and Killymard; and was Dean of Raphoe from 1630 to 1660.

He married Marion Murray, daughter of John Murray of Broughton, Wigtownshire, Scotland, and had an enormous family (twenty-seven by some accounts), many of whom died young. Nine children reached adulthood, including-

- General Sir Albert Cunningham (later generations spelt the name Conyngham)
- Alexander
- Margaret, who married the Reverend Alexander Montgomery, Prebendary of Doe, County Donegal: they were the grandparents of Colonel Alexander Montgomery
- Catherine, who married John Leslie, Bishop of Clogher, and had several children.

Church of Ireland titles
| Preceded by Archibald Adair | Dean of Raphoe; 1630–1660 | Succeeded by John Leslie |
