= John Trench =

English Anglican priest

John Trench was an eighteenth-century English Anglican priest in Ireland: he was educated at Magdalen Hall, Oxford and was Dean of Raphoe from the 21st of January 1692 until his death on the 24th of June 1725.

Church of Ireland titles
Preceded by Nathanael Wilson	Dean of Raphoe; 1692–1725	Succeeded by William Cotterell
