= John Hopkins (poet) =

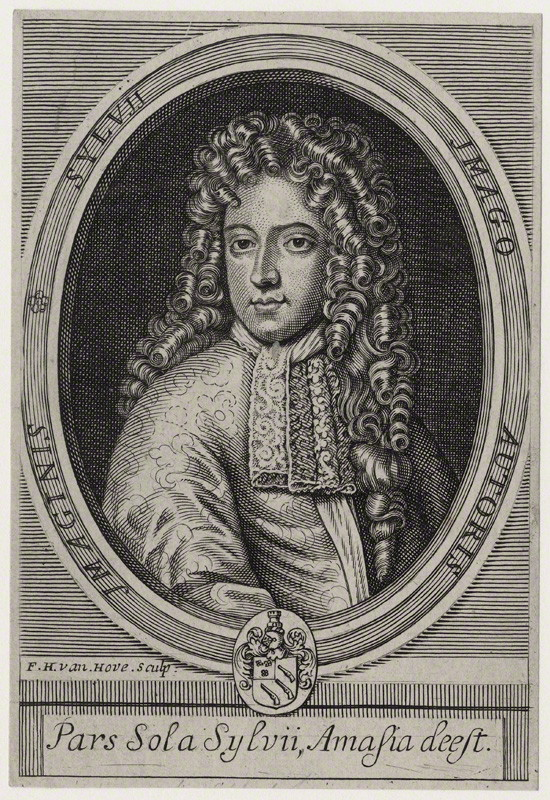
- John Hopkins, contemporary engraving by Frederick Hendrik van Hove. The inscription includes his pseudonym Sylvius.
- Born: 1675
- Died: Unknown
- Education: Jesus College, Cambridge
- Writing career
- Genre: Poetry

John Hopkins (born 1675) was an Anglo-Irish poet. He was the second son of Ezekiel Hopkins, bishop of Derry, and younger brother of Charles Hopkins.

== Life ==
He was born on 1 January 1675. John Hopkins graduated B.A. in 1693, and proceeded M.A. in 1698 from Jesus College, Cambridge.

== Works ==
Hopkins published in 1698 two Pindaric poems:

- The Triumphs of Peace, or the Glories of Nassau … written at the time of his Grace the Duke of Ormond's entrance into Dublin; and
- The Victory of Death; or the Fall of Beauty, on the death of Lady Cutts (Elizabeth, second wife of John Cutts, 1st Baron Cutts).

In the following year he issued Milton's Paradise Lost imitated in Rhyme. In the Fourth, Sixth, and Ninth Books: Containing the Primitive Loves. The Battel of the Angels. The Fall of Man. His final work was a collection of love-verses and translations from Ovid, Amasia, or the Works of the Muses … In three volumes, 1700, with a general dedication to Isabella FitzRoy, Duchess of Grafton, and dedications of particular sections to various persons of distinction.

There is a derisive notice on Hopkins in A Session of the Poets, 1704–5.
