= William Cotterell =

Irish priest

William Cotterell (c.1698–1744) was an eighteenth-century Church of Ireland priest. He was the third son of the courtier Charles Lodowick Cotterell and his second wife, Elizabeth Chute.

Cotterell was educated at Pembroke College, Cambridge, admitted in 1716 at age 18, and at Trinity College Dublin. He was ordained in 1724 by John Potter.

Cotterell was Dean of Raphoe from 1725 until 1743; and Bishop of Ferns and Leighlin from then until his death on 21 June 1744.

Church of Ireland titles
Preceded by John Trench	Dean of Raphoe; 1725–1743	Succeeded by Arthur Smyth
Preceded by George Stone	Bishop of Ferns and Leighlin; 1743–1744	Succeeded by Robert Downes
