= Richard Allott =

Anglo-Irish cleric, librarian, musician and academic

Rev. Richard Allott junior
- Precentor of Armagh Cathedral
- Church: Church of Ireland
- Diocese: Armagh
- In office: 1834–1858
- Predecessor: John Cleland
- Other posts: Librarian of Armagh Library (1814–1834); Senior Fellow of Trinity College, Cambridge (1830–1858); Rector of Killeavy (1834–1858)

Personal details
- Died: Armagh, Ireland
- Buried: Armagh Cathedral
- Denomination: Anglican (Church of Ireland)
- Occupation: Cleric, academic, librarian, music collector
- Education: Harrow School; Trinity College, Cambridge

Richard Allott junior (1782/3–1858) was an Anglo-Irish cleric and academic, known as a librarian and a musician at Armagh Cathedral, where he earned the nickname "Fiddling Dick", and as a music collector.

== Richard Allott senior ==
Richard Allott senior (1744/5–1832), his father, was the third son of Brian Allott (1693–1773), Rector of Kirkheaton; he was an Anglican priest in Ireland during the later 18th and early 19th centuries. Towards the end of his life he was in Switzerland, and he died at Beau-Rivage, Lausanne, aged 87.

=== Early life ===
Allott was educated Beverley Grammar School. He was admitted to Trinity College, Cambridge in 1762, graduating B.A. there in 1766, and M.A. in 1769. He took degrees of B.D. (1776) and D.D. (1783) at Trinity College, Dublin.

=== Cleric ===
Ordained deacon in 1767, Allott became rector of Annaduff in Ireland. From 1771 to 1774 he was a prebendary of St Mary's Cathedral, Tuam. From 1774 he was precentor in Armagh Cathedral, as his son more prominently would be, and a prebendary there. The position was taken over in 1802 by John Cleland (1755–1834). He was Dean of Raphoe from 1795 until his death in 1832.

Allott married an Irish wife, Anna Maria Weller. Their youngest daughter, Jane, was a watercolour artist.

In the Armagh disturbances, Allott in 1789 forwarded a prospectus of the Defenders to the 1st Marquess of Buckingham, as Lord-Lieutenant of Ireland. After the Battle of the Diamond of 1795, in north-west County Armagh, Allott as a magistrate signed the resolution of the county magistrates. In December of that year, Arthur Acheson, 2nd Viscount Gosford as governor of the county spoke on the fighting; he was a Whig, considered by some to be sympathetic to Catholic concerns, about the violent Peep o' Day Boys. Allott was taken to have "already proved his anxiety to repress outrage and maintain peace". In 1796 Thomas Pelham, who had visited Allott in Armagh to discuss a possible university there, wrote to John Hely Hutchinson including specifics on plans arising from Allott.

Horatio Nelson wrote to Allott in 1804, following the death in 1803 of Allott's brother the Rev. Bryan Allott, who had been Rector at Burnham Westgate in Norfolk, and a neighbour to the Nelson family. Richard Allott had met him there. He preached the fast sermon to the House of Commons on 26 February 1806. It contained a suggestion that God was using Napoleon as a scourge for sinful Britain.

=== Last years ===
In 1817 Allott was living in Orchard Street, near Portman Square in London. Lord John Beresford, Bishop of Raphoe in 1819, wrote for a parliamentary report on the Church of Ireland that Allott was absent with his leave, "on account of the embarrassed state of his circumstances, and his advanced period of life". His duties were being carried out by six curates. When Hugh M'Neile was ordained as curate of Stranorlar in 1820, where Robert Butt, father of Isaac Butt, was the incumbent, it was Allott who made the nomination, offered to M'Neile's uncle. The uncle was Lieutenant-general Daniel McNeile, and was a friend of Allott. At this point Allott was abroad in continental Europe.

Allott's daughter Jane died at Lausanne in 1821, by which time Allott had settled at Ouchy. He went on to officiate at the English Protestant church services there, and gained a residence permit. The Rev. Isaac Cheesbrough from Penrith was appointed that year to the church, and Allott gave services with him, which were held in the French Protestant church.

Allott confirmed the 1822 baptism, according to Church of Ireland rites, of Charles William George Bury, future 3rd Earl of Charleville (1822–1859), in Geneva. Allott's wife died on 13 July 1824. His wife and a daughter were buried in the Pierre de Plan cemetery at Ouchy, where he erected a memorial to them. A guidebook of 1829 mentions a monument at Lausanne, by the sculptor Gibson of Rome (but gives date 1823), to "Anna Maria Allott, nata Waller". Allott was again stated to be non-resident at Raphoe in a report of 1824, with the reason given as bad health.

In 1828 Allott bought from François Bonjour, a Parisian, a substantial property at Ouchy on Lake Geneva, comprising two houses and land.

=== Later developments ===
Allott's daughter Anna Maria lived at Ouchy, where Charles Bunbury dined with her in 1848. She attended a marriage in the Close family at Drumbanagher House, County Armagh, in 1850. She died at Lausanne on 12 December 1851. Louisa Beaufort, a cousin, was one of her executors; also a beneficiary, with Richard Allott junior.

The Société immobilière d'Ouchy was founded in 1857 to build the Beau-Rivage Hotel on the former Allott property to the east of village of Ouchy, keeping the name it had been given.

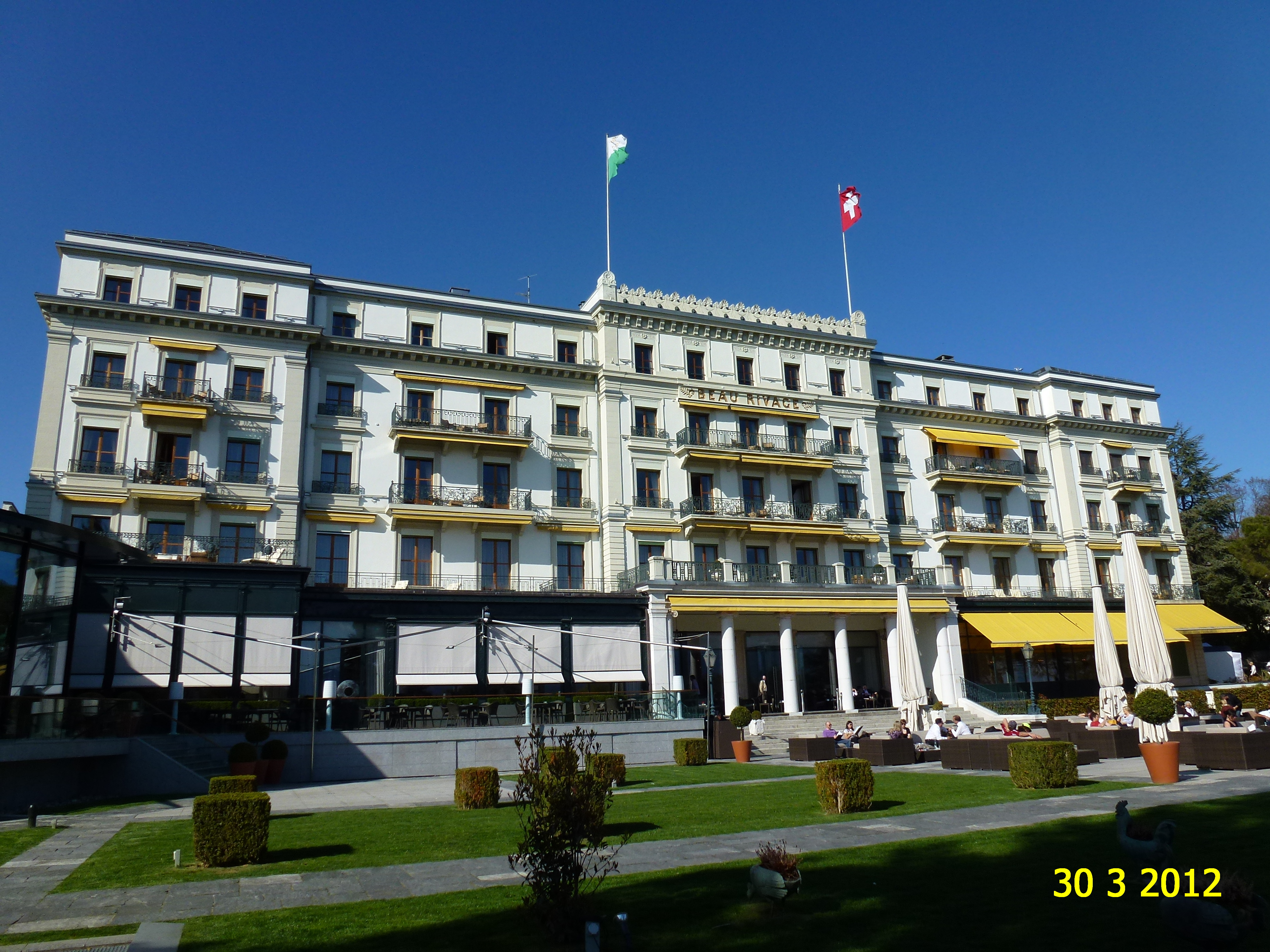
Beau-Rivage Palace Hotel, 2012 photograph

== Life ==
Allott junior was educated at Harrow School, and admitted as a pensioner to Trinity College, Cambridge in 1801. He graduated B.A. in 1805, M.A. in 1808, and became a Fellow there in 1807. He succeeded William Lodge DD (1742–1813) at the Armagh Library founded by Primate Richard Robinson, taking up the position on 3 September 1814. In 1815 he prepared the first significant catalogue of the library's manuscripts, nearly 5,000 in number.

In 1825 Allott, with Thomas Romney Robinson, was brought onto the committee attempting to set up a Mechanics' Institute in Armagh. The main proponent responsible for involving Anglican clerics in the venture was George Ensor, Allott being considered influential with them. Over the next year or two, clerical support was withdrawn, and the Institute failed.

In 1830 Allott was elected a Senior Fellow of Trinity College, Cambridge, replacing John Henry Renouard who had died. In 1834, on the death of John Cleland, he took over as precentor of Armagh Cathedral, and Rector of Killeavy, giving up at this point his post as librarian. He held these positions to the end of his life. In his capacity as a Senior Fellow of Trinity, he attended a dinner in Cambridge for the incognito Frederick Augustus II of Saxony in 1844.

== Death and legacy ==
Allott died at Armagh in 1858. He was buried in the south aisle of Armagh Cathedral, where a window was dedicated to his memory. He had been the senior fellow of Trinity College, Cambridge since 1853. At the time in 1860 when the donations for the window were being collected, the Newry Telegraph commented adversely, saying that from Allott's large estate nothing was left to Irish charitable causes. The window was installed in 1862; the lower part refers to the story of Saul and David in 1 Samuel 16.

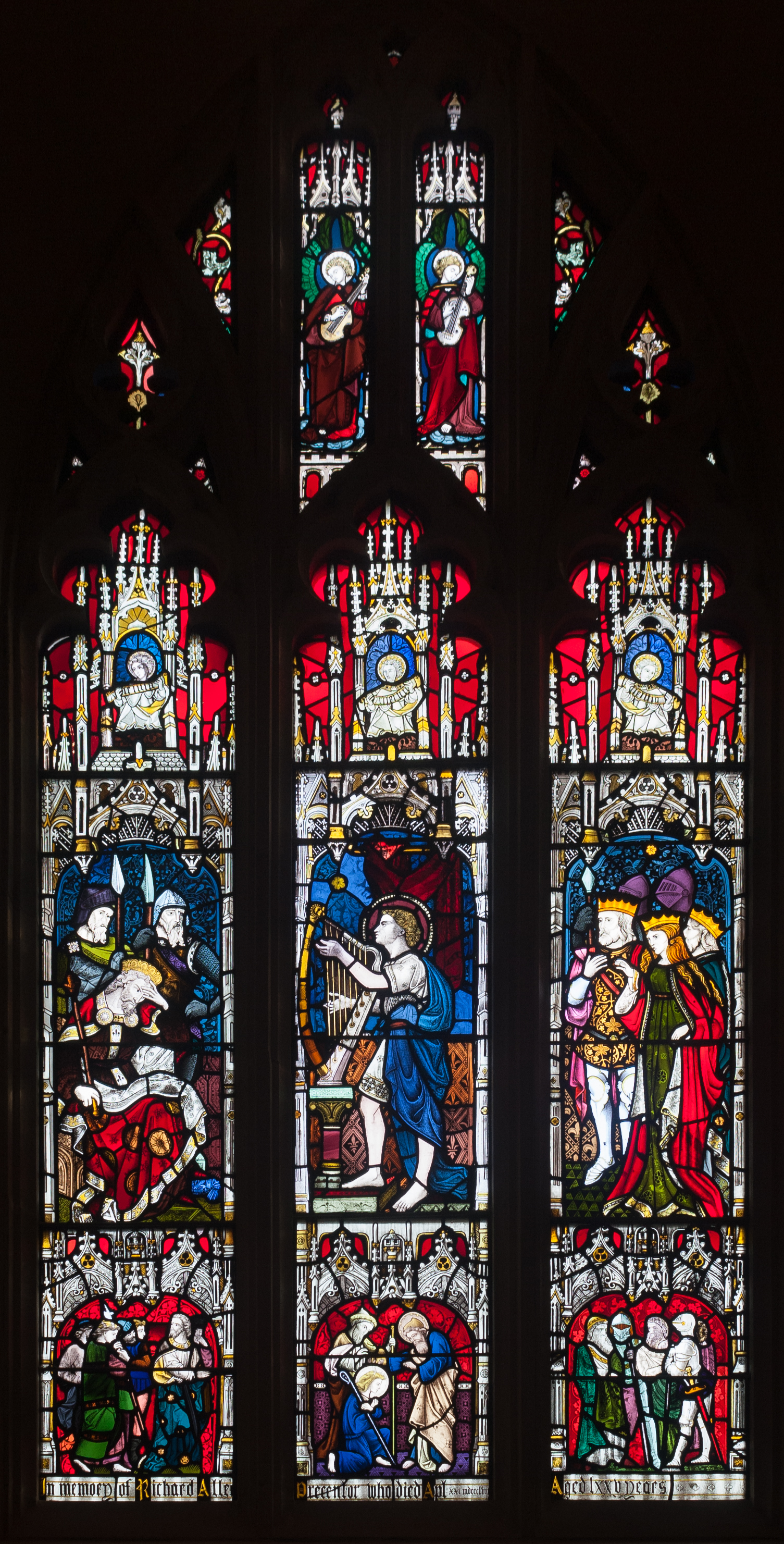
Memorial window in Armagh Cathedral to Richard Allott

== Musical interests ==
Leslie's Armagh Clergy and Parishes described Allott as "a most accomplished musician as well as scholar". On 17 December 1824 he directed a concert in the Music Hall, Vicar's Hill, Armagh with a programme of music by Emanuele d'Astorga, Corelli, Gluck, Handel, Benedetto Marcello, Mozart, Marcantonio Negri and Pergolesi, given to a distinguished audience.

John Jebb in A plea for what is left of the Cathedrals (1852) praised the Allotts, father and son, writing of Richard Allott junior at Armagh Cathedral that "he has made that choir perhaps the most efficient in the united Church." Edward Rogers wrote in 1881 of the music of the Armagh Cathedral Choir and its Music Hall:

For the convenience of the Rev. R. Allott, who always "played first fiddle", and made the programme of performance for the weekly concerts, much of the music was kept at his house.

Allott was the dedicatee of the two volumes of The Beauties of Purcell edited by John Clarke Whitfield. He, or his father, owned a first edition of Francesco Geminiani's Sonatas Op. 4, now a rare work. He is tentatively identified as the purchaser in Piacenza in 1821 of north Italian counterpoint manuscripts, now in the British Library. He was one of the early subscribers to the Bach Gesellschaft set up in 1850.

== Sale of library ==
Allott's musical library was announced as for sale on 26 July 1858, by Puttick & Simpson, in particular including editions of Handel. Murphy and Smaczny, however, write "It must also be noted that a large portion of the early nineteenth-century cathedral music was mistakenly sold with the possessions of Richard Allott [...]".

The musical library was sold on 2 August 1858, by Puttick; and the rest of Allott's library on 29 November by Leigh Sotheby.
