= Arthur Barrett (footballer) =

English footballer (1927–2011)

Personal information
- Full name: Arthur Henry Barrett
- Date of birth: 21 December 1927
- Place of birth: Liverpool, England
- Date of death: 10 January 2011 (aged 83)
- Place of death: Cheshire, England
- Position: Wing half

Senior career*
Years	Team	Apps	(Gls)
1946–1947	Tranmere Rovers	1	(0)
- * Club domestic league appearances and goals

Arthur Henry Barrett (21 December 1927 – 10 January 2011) was an English footballer, who played as a wing half in the Football League for Tranmere Rovers.
