= Menu engineering =

Design of a menu to maximize restaurant profits

Menu engineering or menu psychology is the design of a menu to maximize restaurant profits.

== History ==
The concept of menu engineering was first introduced in 1982 by Michael L. Kasavana and Donald I. Smith.

== Visual perception ==
Visual perception and attention are linked to how customers read a menu. Most menus are presented visually (though many restaurants verbally list daily specials). The majority of menu engineering recommendations focus on how to increase attention by strategically arranging menu categories within the pages of the menu, and item placement within a menu category. This strategic placement of categories and items is referred to as the theory of sweet spots.

The reasoning being sweet spots stem from the classical effect in psychology known as the serial position effect (also known as the rules of recency and primacy). The thought is, customers are most likely to remember the first and last things they see on a menu—hence, sweet spots on a menu should be where the customers look first and last. To date, there is no empirical evidence on the efficacy of the sweet spots on menus.

Customer perception of items offered on a menu can also be affected by subtle textual manipulations. For example, descriptive labeling of menu items may produce positive effects, leading to higher customer satisfaction, and higher perceived product value. Similarly, the presence of dollar signs or other potential monetary cues may cause guests to spend less. There are also studies on how different menu types trigger diners’ behavioral intentions in restaurants’ innovation diffusion from paper to digital menus

== Managerial accounting ==
Low food cost and high gross profit are not mutually exclusive attributes of a menu item. A second approach called cost-margin analysis identifies items that are both low in food cost and return a higher than average gross profit. These items referred to as primes.

== The menu engineering matrix ==
Kasavana and Smith's model classifies each item on a menu along two dimensions: its popularity, how often it is ordered relative to the other items, and its contribution margin, the selling price less the item's food or beverage cost. The model rests on margin in dollars rather than food cost percentage. Kasavana has called the belief that a lower food cost percentage makes an item more profitable "perhaps the oldest misconception in foodservice management". In his example, a chicken dish costing $1.00 and selling for $3.00 has a lower food cost percentage than a steak costing $2.50 and selling for $5.00, but the steak earns $2.50 per sale against the chicken's $2.00, making it the item to promote. In the original model, an item counts as popular if it sells at least 70 percent of an equal share of the menu mix, and as high-margin if its contribution margin is at or above the menu's sales-weighted average. Because both thresholds are calculated from the menu itself, an item's classification describes its performance relative to the other items on the same menu rather than against a fixed benchmark.

The two thresholds divide the menu into four categories, each associated with a recommended course of action:

- Stars (popular, high margin) are kept unchanged in recipe and portion and given prominent placement on the menu; small price increases may be possible.
- Plowhorses (popular, low margin) are kept, since guests order them often, and made more profitable through modest portion adjustments, ingredient substitutions, slight price increases, or pairing with higher-margin add-ons.
- Puzzles (unpopular, high margin) are given better descriptions, a more visible position on the menu, promotion, or recommendations from servers.
- Dogs (unpopular, low margin) are candidates for removal, which also simplifies kitchen operations and inventory.
