= Arthur Barrett (priest) =

Anglican priest

The Reverend Arthur Barrett
- Rector
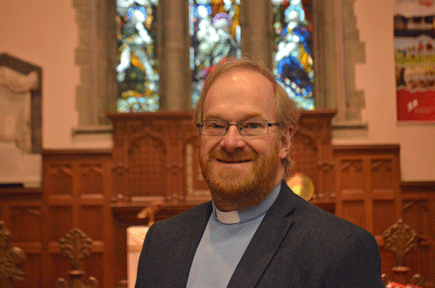
- Church: Church of Ireland
- Province: Dublin
- Diocese: Glendalough
- In office: January 2021 to present
- Previous post: Dean of Raphoe Diocese of Raphoe

Personal details
- Born: 17 March 1960 (age 66) Dublin, Ireland
- Denomination: Anglican
- Spouse: Brigid
- Children: 3
- Education: Trinity College, Dublin

The Reverend (Kenneth) Arthur (Lambart) Barrett, BTh (born 1960) is an Anglican priest and the current rector of the Arklow group of parishes, previously he was Dean of Raphoe in the Church of Ireland Diocese of Derry and Raphoe.

He studied at the Church of Ireland Theological College and was ordained deacon in 1997, and priest in 1998. After a curacy in Seagoe Parish he held incumbencies in Booterstown and Sligo. In his last incumbency before his elevation to the deanery,
