= Frank E. Buttolph =

Frances Editha Buttles (November 9, 1844–February 27, 1924), known as Frank E. Buttolph, was an American archivist who collected about 25,000 restaurant menus over a span of 23 years. In 1899, her archives were donated to the New York Public Library as the Miss Frank E. Buttolph American Menu Collection, 1851-1930.

== Early life ==
She was born in Mansfield, Pennsylvania, and was in the first graduating class from Mansfield State Normal School in 1866. According to a letter dated May 1913, she enjoyed botanical research in the area's hills, and later learned Italian language and translated "Gerusalemme Liberata" by the Italian poet Torquato Tasso to English. She wrote in the letter, "There is not a day when I hear English alone. Having but one language at command would seem to me like having but one dress for every occasion." She also called herself a "born collector".

In a letter dated February 14, 1900, Buttolph explained the recent origin of her hobby: "On New Year's Day I stopped in the Columbia Restaurant for lunch and thought it might be interesting to file a bill of fare at the library. A week later the thought occured, why not preserve others? As a result, 930 have passed through my fingers to the Astor Library." Buttolph began to run ads in restaurant trade journals requesting menus and received submissions from around the world.

"It is of the highest importance the cards should be well wrapped and then placed between stiff card-board of a larger size, else they are sure to be soiled and broken in the mail, which condition renders them worthless. One beauty of this collection is, nearly all of the 3,600 cards [in the collection] are perfect, but I have had had to fight harder then Gen. Otis did in the Philippines to keep my standard in position. When it has to be lowered I shall discontinue the work."

"It is of the highest importance the cards should be well wrapped and then placed between stiff card-board of a larger size, else they are sure to be soiled and broken in the mail, which condition renders them worthless. One beauty of this collection is, nearly all of the 3,600 cards [in the collection] are perfect, but I have had had to fight harder then Gen. Otis did in the Philippines to keep my standard in position. When it has to be lowered I shall discontinue the work."

— text from one of Buttolph's ads, appearing in Hotel Monthly (August, 1900)

— Buttolph's ad in Hotel Monthly (August, 1900)

By 1908, she had collected 15,000 menus, and newspaper reports said menu collecting was "becoming quite a fad" for women. In 1915, The New York Times described her as "unquestionably the greatest living authority on dinners".

== Miss Frank E. Buttolph American Menu Collection, 1851-1930 ==
In 1899, Buttolph offered to donate her private collection of American menus to the New York Public Library. The director of the library at the time, John Shaw Billings, agreed to house the collection. Buttolph remained a steadfast presence at the library, continuing to expand the collection until her death in 1924. By 1903, there were more than 10,000 menus in the collection.

Buttolph's collection is indexed and sorted, with separate classes for meals in restaurants, hotels, meals on steamships and dining cars, and in the homes of people. The second class contained menus of famous private and public dinners, including events by rulers, diplomats, highbrow weddings, and special meals served to distinguished men and women privately on ocean voyages. Among the collection is a dinner menu from a public café in Paris on Christmas Day, 1870, the ninety-ninth day of the siege. Included on that menu is soup titled "consomme d'Elephant" and one of the roasts "Le chat flanque de rats". Other menus include American-Indian dinners and even a menu for the two hundredth anniversary dinner of The Thirteen Club. Today, it is part of the New York Public Library Menu Collection, curated by culinary librarian, Rebecca Federman.

== Personal life and death ==
Buttolph was known for her remarkable diligence, persistently contacting restaurants to source menus as well as demanding they be in near-perfect condition. Newspapers have noted her "idiosyncrasies and negative behavior" and "colorful personality". Staff of the New York Public Library expressed that she was "constantly complaining about something and when she gets started, it is almost impossible to get rid of her." The New York Public Library eventually dismissed her in 1923 but she remained devoted to the collection, writing in one of her final letters, "For many years my library work has been the only thing I had to live for. It was my heart, my soul, my life."

Buttolph died of pneumonia at Bellevue Hospital on February 27, 1924.
