= Capel Wiseman =

English Anglican priest in Ireland

Capel Wiseman was an English Anglican priest in Ireland in the second half of the seventeenth century:

Wiseman was educated at New College, Oxford. He was Chaplain to the Lord Lieutenant of Ireland from 1772 until 1776 when he was appointed Dean of Raphoe. In 1783 he became Bishop of Dromore, a post he held until his death in September 1694.
