= Taughboyne =

Taughboyne Teach Baoithín
- Civil Parish
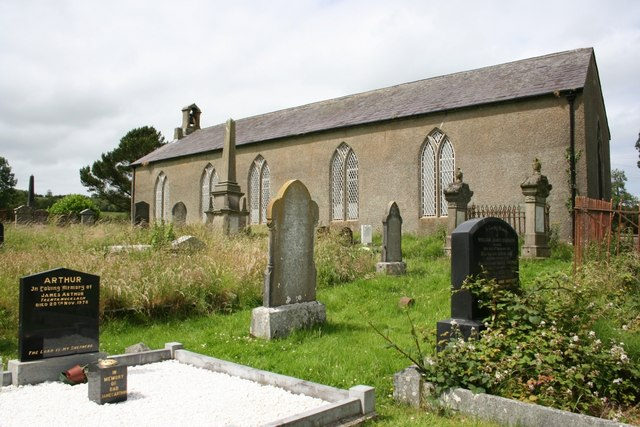
- Taughboyne Parish Church

- Location in Ireland
- Coordinates: 54°57′32″N 7°28′34″W
- Country: Ireland
- Province: Ulster
- County: County Donegal

Government
  - Dáil Éireann: Donegal
- Time zone: UTC+0 (WET)
  - Summer (DST): UTC-1 (IST (WEST))

Taughboyne (Irish: Teach Baoithín meaning "house of Baithen") is a civil parish, in County Donegal, Ireland.

Taughboyne is located 8 km (5.0 mi) West-South-West from Derry, on the road to Raphoe; containing, with the village and ancient disfranchised borough of St Johnston, 6335 inhabitants (in 1837). St. Baithen, son of Brendan, a disciple and kinsman of St Columba, and his successor in the abbey of Hy, founded Tegbaothin in Tyrconnell: he flourished towards the close of the sixth century. The parish, according to the Ordnance survey, comprises an area of 15,773 3/4 statute acres, including a large portion of bog: the land is chiefly arable, and of good quality. There are some extensive slate quarries, but the slates are small and of a coarse quality.

The River Foyle, which bounds the parish on the east, is navigable for small boats to St. Johnstown, where a fair is held on 25 Nov. The living is a rectory and vicarage, in the diocese of Raphoe, and in the patronage of the Marquess of Abercorn: the tithes amount to £1569. 4. 7 1/2.; and the glebe, comprising 317 acres (1.28 km^{2}), is valued at £260. 6. 5 1/2. per annum (in c.1837). The glebe-house was originally built in 1785, at a cost of £1313 British, and subsequently improved at an expense of £1399 by the then incumbent. The church was erected in 1626; the Ecclesiastical Commissioners have lately granted £268 for its repair. In the Roman Catholic divisions the parish forms part of the union or district of Lagan, or Raymochy; the chapel was built about 1787. In the parochial school partly supported by an endowment of Col. Robertson, a school under the London Hibernian Society, and two schools supported by subscription, about 200 children are educated; there are also nine private schools, in which are about the same number of children, and five Sunday schools: two school-houses were erected by the Marquess of Abercorn around 1830. There is a dispensary for the poor.
