= Ezekiel Hopkins =

- Bishop of Derry
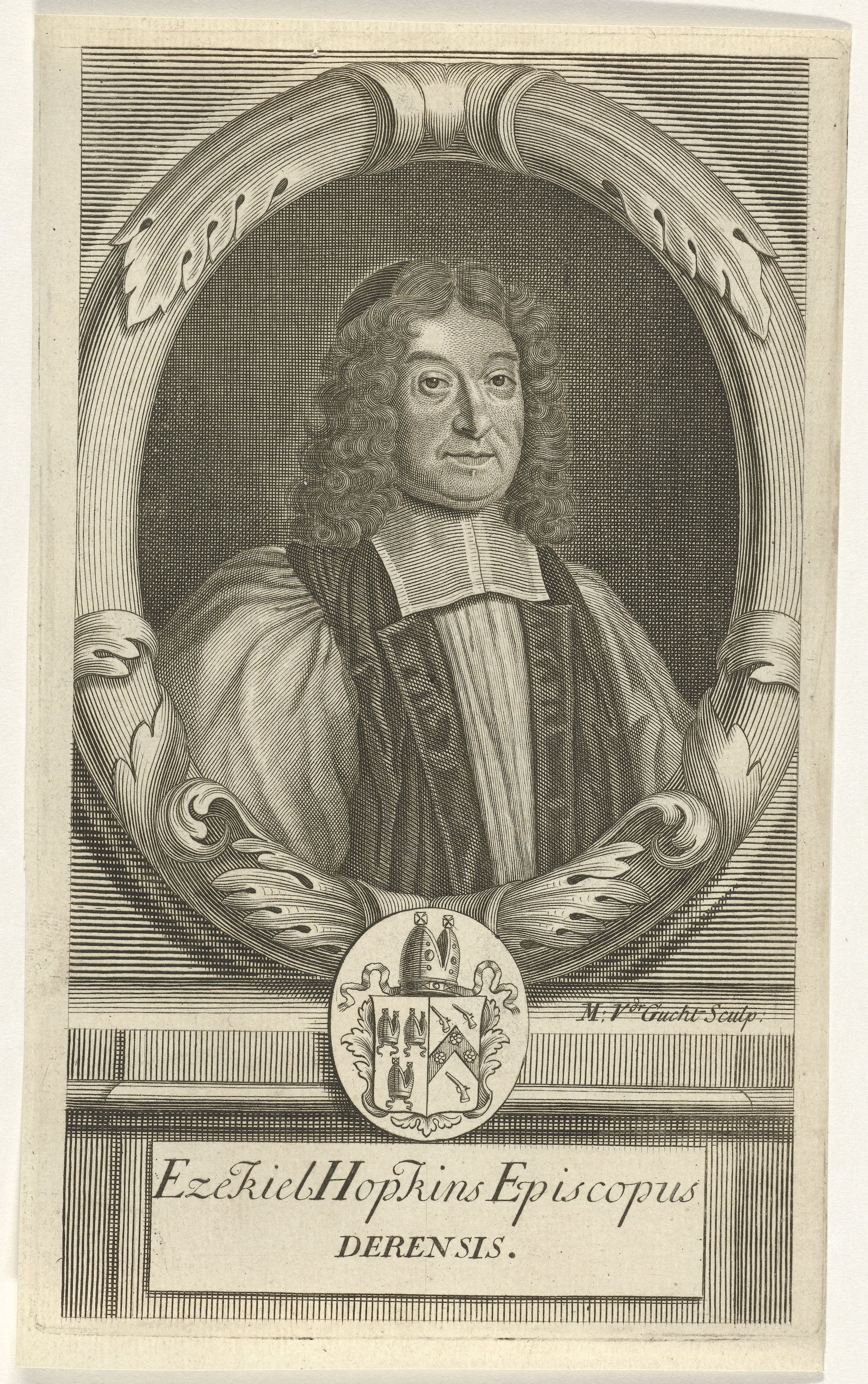
- Church: Church of Ireland
- See: Diocese of Derry
- In office: 1681 — 1690
- Predecessor: Robert Mossom
- Successor: William King

Orders
- Consecration: 29 October 1671 by James Margetson

Personal details
- Born: 1634 Crediton, Devon
- Died: 1690 (aged 55–56)

Ezekiel Hopkins (1634–1690) was an Anglican divine in the Church of Ireland, who was Bishop of Derry from 1681 to 1690. He was born in Crediton, England.

== Life ==
He was born in Devon and was educated at Merchant Taylors' School and Magdalen College, Oxford, where he was a chorister from 1648 to 1653 and graduated with a B.A. in 1655 and M.A. in 1656. After 1660, he was assistant to William Spurstow in Hackney, but he conformed after the Act of Uniformity 1662, becoming a lecturer in London. In 1666, he became minister of St. Mary Arches, Exeter.

Lord Robartes appointed Hopkins his chaplain upon becoming Lord Lieutenant of Ireland in 1669. Hopkins became Treasurer of Christ Church Cathedral, Waterford in 1669. In 1670, he became Dean of Raphoe, and the following year, Bishop of Raphoe. His translation to Derry was in 1681. Despite being summoned by James II of England to the short-lived Patriot Parliament in Dublin, in 1689 he returned to England, becoming a preacher at St. Mary Aldermanbury, and dying on 19 June 1690.

== Works ==
His written legacy includes his Expositions of the Ten Commandments, which remains in print in the modern era.

== Family ==
Hopkins married his first wife, Mary Triplett in 1661 at St Peter Cornhill in London. In 1665 he married again, to Alicia Moore (d.1681), a great-niece of Sir Thomas Vyner, sometime Lord Mayor of London, to whom he dedicated his Vanity of the World. They had two sons, Charles (c.1671–1700), poet and dramatist, and John (born 1675), the author of Amasia. In 1685, at Totteridge, Ezekiel Hopkins married his third wife, Lady Araminta Robartes, the eldest daughter of John Robartes, 1st Earl of Radnor, and his second wife, Isabella, daughter of Sir John Smith. He and his second wife were the parents of Francis, who was the grandfather of Sir Francis Hopkins M.P., 1st Baronet of Athboy, County Meath.

However, according to National Library of Ireland (Registered Pedigrees Vol. 17), the great grandfather of Sir Francis Hopkins, MP, 1st Baronet of Athboy, County Meath, was James Hopkins. The pedigree for James Hopkins is cancelled on page 217, and with it a reference to Ezekiel Hopkins. The tree proper (without the reference to Ezekiel) follows on page 220.
