= Dean of Raphoe =

Church of Ireland official

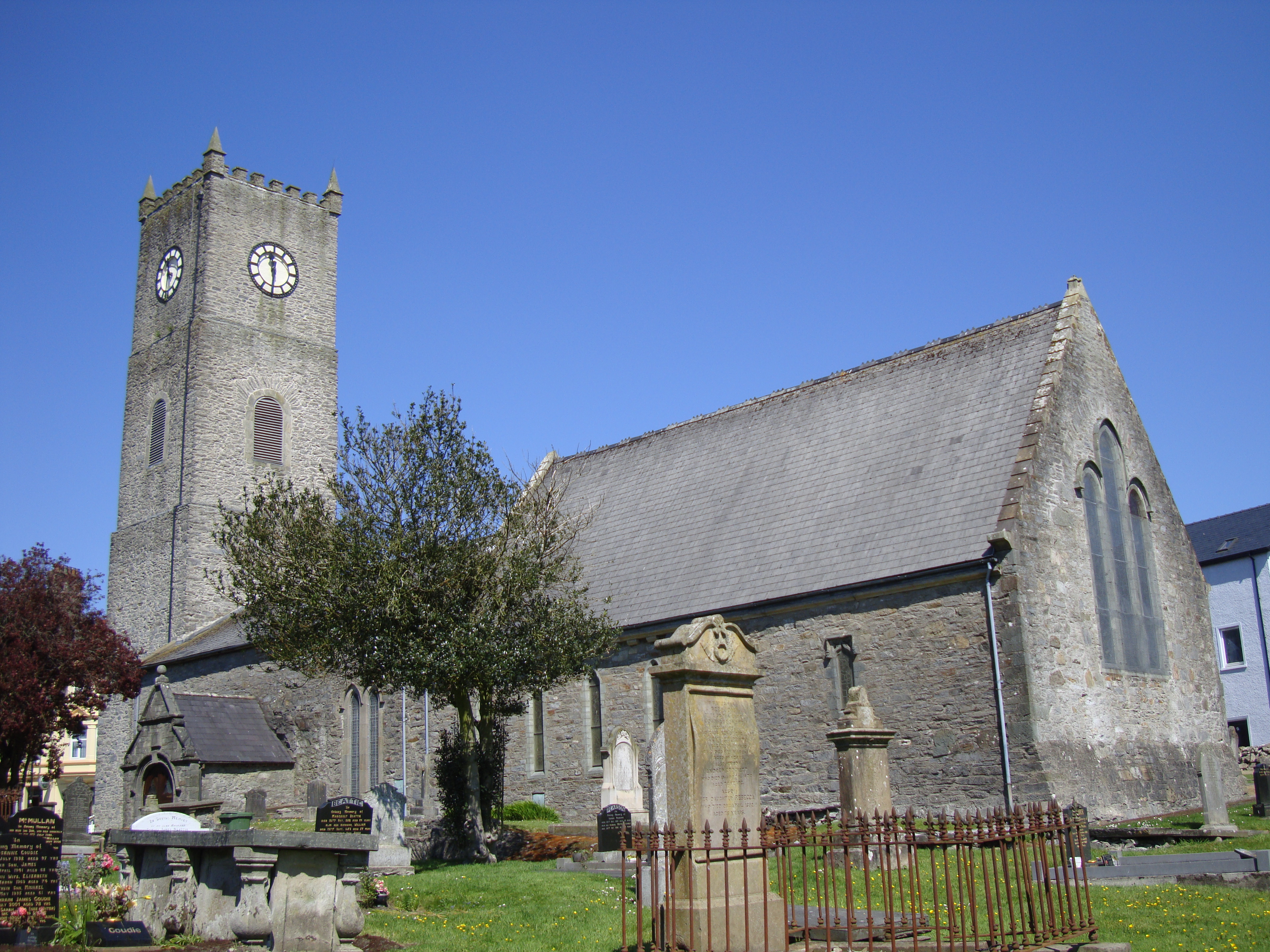
Cathedral church of St. Eunan, Raphoe

The Dean of Raphoe is based at the Cathedral Church of St Eunan in Raphoe, County Donegal, in Ulster. The Deanery is within the Diocese of Derry and Raphoe within the Church of Ireland. The Dean is the Rev. Elizabeth (Liz) Fitzgerald, the first female dean in the cathedral’s history.

== List of deans ==
- 1603 John Albright
- 1609 Phelim O'Doghertie
- 1622–1630 Archibald Adair (afterwards Bishop of Killala and Achonry, 1630)
- 1630–1660 Alexander Cunningham
- 1660/1–1661 John Leslie (afterwards Bishop of Clogher, 1661)
- 1661–1670 John Wellwood
- 1670–1671 Ezekiel Hopkins (afterwards Bishop of Raphoe, 1671)
- 1671 Thomas Buttolph
- 1676–1683 Capel Wiseman (afterwards Bishop of Dromore, 1683)
- 1683/4–1691/2 Nathanael Wilson (afterwards Bishop of Limerick, Ardfert and Aghadoe, 1691/2)
- 1691/2–1725 John Trench
- 1725–1742/3 William Cotterell (afterwards Bishop of Ferns and Leighlin, 1742/3)
- 1742/3–1744 Arthur Smyth (afterwards Dean of Derry, 1744)
- 1744–1756 Anthony Thompson
- 1757–1776 William Barker
- 1776–1776 Thomas Bray
- 1776–1795 James King
- 1795–1832 Richard Allott
- 1832–1873 Lord Edward Chichester
- 1873-1882 John Gwynn (afterwards Dean of Derry, 1882)
- 1882–1897 Edward Bowen (died 1897)
- 1897-1897 Michael Bell Cox (died within a few days of appointment; not installed)
- 1897–1900 Richard Bennett
- 1900–1903 Richard Aemilius Baillie
- 1903–1905 Joseph Potter
- 1905–1916 William George Kennedy (died December, successor appointed the following month)
- 1917–1940 John Pirrie Conerney
- 1940-1947 Thomas Henry Staunton
- 1947-1957 Joseph Kildare Beattie
- 1957-1959 Cyril James Homan
- 1960-1962 John Ernest Doyle
- 1962–1967 George Good (afterwards Dean of Derry, 1967)
- 1967–1972 Stephen Arthur Cave
- 1972-1976 John Watson
- 1976-1980 Edward Alexander Moore
- 1980–1992 Samuel William Reede
- 1992–2002 Stephen White (afterwards Dean of Killaloe, 2002)
- 2003-2013 John Hay
- 2014–2021 Arthur Barrett
- 2023- Elizabeth Fitzgerald
