= Cuthbert Buckle =

Lord Mayor of London

Sir Cuthbert Buckle

Lord Mayor of London
- In office October 1593 – 1 July 1594
- Preceded by: William Rowe
- Succeeded by: Richard Martin

Sheriff of the City of London
- In office 1582–1583 Serving with William Rowe

Personal details
- Born: c. 1533 Stainmore, Westmorland, England
- Died: 1 July 1594 (aged c. 61) London, England
- Spouse(s): Joan Davye (m. 1564; d. 1577); Elizabeth Marston (d. 1594)
- Occupation: Merchant (Vintner)

Sir Cuthbert Buckle (also Buckell or Buckley) (?c. 1533; died 1594) was a 16th-century English merchant and Lord Mayor of London of Westmorland origins.

== Life ==
=== Young life and marriages ===
Born in Stainmore near Brough-under-Stainmore, Westmorland, he was the son of Christopher Buckle.

He became a freeman of the Vintners Company of London. In January 1563/64 he married Joan (or sometimes spelled Johane or Joane) Davye at St Mary Woolnoth, London; he was churchwarden in that church in 1568-1569. In the year of his marriage, 1564, Buckle petitioned to have his house "at the Bisshoppeshead" (in Pope's Head Alley, in that parish) included among the forty "permitted taverns" fully licensed to operate in the city of London. The Bishop's Head, formerly called The Pope's Head, had been demised by indenture by Thomas Hancoke and his wife Marie, on 23 August 1 & 2 Philip and Mary, to Robert Golding, citizen and Vintner, whose wife Joan afterwards became the wife of Ralph Davye, citizen and Vintner. Ralph held the Bishop's Head in the right of his wife, and in his will written 12 May 1563 restored it to her. Four deaths in the household of Rauff Davye, Vintner, in September 1563, culminated in Rauff's death on 8 October. The proving of his will by the oath of his widow and executrix Joan on 8 November 1563 shortly preceded the marriage of Johane Davye to Cuthbert Buckle on 24 January 1563/64.

In 1570 he was a witness to the will of Alderman Sir William Harper. Although resident in London, Buckle maintained his Westmorland connections, for in 1576 he presented to Brough-under-Stainmore "a handsome reading desk", which was inscribed as his gift and was at some time kept in St Michael's church. The record transcribed from the St Mary Woolnoth register as the burial of "Joane, wief of Gilbert Buckle, Vintner' on 3 June 1577 refers to the death of Cuthbert Buckle's first wife. They had one son, John Buckle, who was baptized on 14 March 1567 at St Mary Woolnoth.

He re-married to Elizabeth daughter of Thomas Maston or Marston of London, gent, and sister of Nicholas Marston, Archdeacon of Cornwall, and his brethren. Elizabeth's will shows that she was the niece of Alice Bradbridge (died 1604), the silk merchant who was married to the London Alderman, Sheriff and Master Draper, Francis Barnham (died 1576), a relationship confirmed in Alice's will of 1604: in the pedigree of Robinson of Cheshunt shown by Sir Henry Chauncy it is shown that Sybil the wife of Thomas Marston (and mother of Elizabeth) was indeed the sister of William Bradbridge, bishop of Exeter. Elizabeth was the widow of George Utley, Draper (died July 1579), by whom she had two sons of her own. Buckle was Treasurer of St Thomas's Hospital from 1579 to 1581. In June 1581 his son John Buckle died, and was buried at St Mary-at-Hill (Billingsgate ward), the church associated with the later part of Cuthbert Buckle's life.

=== Alderman and sheriff ===
Having refused election as one of the Sheriffs of London in 1580 (by payment of a £200 fine), he was elected alderman of Farringdon Without in 1582, and served almost a full term in that year as sheriff (with William Rowe), to complete the term of John Haydon, who died in office on 24 November. In August 1584, he as alderman was allocated persons and places in St Mary's Overy Place, London Bridge and elsewhere, to investigate with the assistance of Serjeant Mylles and Messrs Cure and Bates, in the general search for evidences of Papistry (Roman Catholic sympathies): Buckle certificated their findings. Among others he detained Edward Hartley, a servant of Cecily Stonor, who had hosted Edmund Campion's press at Henley-on-Thames.

In August 1585 he dined with Aldermen Rowe, Woodcock and Sir Rowland Hayward, and others, as they conducted their inspection of the decayed pipes at the conduit-heads. On 14 December following, he and Henry Billingsley were deputed by the Court of Aldermen to hear the complaints of the Basketmakers against Christopher Johnson: their Report gave much satisfaction and was entered in the Repertory. On 25 March 1586, he was attached to a small delegation with Aldermen Ralph Woodcock and Henry Billingsley as from the Court of Aldermen to the Stationers' Hall, to hear and to certificate the Stationers' complaints concerning standards in bookbinding, and the conduct of their craft. In particular, the number of leaves or sections to be sewn in folio, decimo and octavo volumes (respectively) was specified, and that they were to be sewn on a sewing press and never stitched or pricked through (the Statutes of Parliament excepted): that only apprentices and immediate members of the family (stipulated) should be put to work in binding, folding or sewing of books for a bookbinder, with penalties to be approved: and that booksellers and retailers should never put out any unbound books to be bound by any foreigner or Stranger, or indeed to anyone who was not a freeman of the city, as was already laid down in an Act.

From 1586 to 1594 he was alderman for the Bridge ward. He successfully obtained judgement on behalf of the City in a debt of 2000 Marks against three Derbyshire manorial landowners in March 1588. In April 1589 Buckle took a 21-year lease of the smeltmill, lead mines and extensive areas of land in Marske, Swaledale, for £1,000, from Arthur and Francis Phillip, sons of James Phillip of Brignall, who had died in 1582 leaving his estates encumbered. The mill, with two furnaces, was then occupied by Richard Willance, and in June 1589 Buckle leased the premises to Willance and two other merchants of Richmond by means of two separate leases, detaching the mill and lands (at £100 per annum) from the mines. In the following August the merchants leased the mines back to the Phillips for the residue of the term of Buckle's lease.

During 1589 Buckle was an assessor for the London Subsidy, together with Aldermen Hugh Offley, Stephen Soame, William Rowe, William Whitmore and others, including Henry Prannell, who in the same year named him an overseer in the execution of his will, and soon afterwards died. Buckle and Prannell, senior Vintners, each stood for loans of £500 heading the Company's required contribution to national defence at the time of the Spanish Armada, 1588. In 1591 Mr Alderman Buckle presented a copy of the King's Bible to Queen's College, Oxford, though membership of the college is not thereby inferred.

A letter was addressed in April 1593 by the Privy Council to Sir Richard Martin, Anthony Ashley, Alderman Cuthbert Buckle and others, as commissioners appointed by the then Lord Mayor (William Rowe), concerning the Dutch Church Libel. They were to take extraordinary pains to discover the author and publisher of various malicious libels which had been set up in the city:

"Theis shalbe therefore to require and aucthorize you to make search and aprehend everie person so to be suspected, and for that purpoze to enter into al houses and places where anie such maie be remayning, and uppon their apprehencion to make search in anie the chambers, studies, chestes and other like places for al manner of writings or papers that may geve you light for the discoverie of the libellers. And after you shal have examined the persons, if you shal finde them dulie to be suspected and they shal refuze to confesse the truth, you shal by aucthoritie hereof put them to the torture in Bridewel, and by th'extremitie thereof, to be used at such times and as often as you shal thincke fit, draw them to discover their knowledge of the said libells." (etc.)

=== Mayoralty ===
Cuthbert Buckle was elected Lord Mayor of London in 1593 and received knighthood in mid-1594, and in 1593-1594 he was also President of St Thomas' Hospital. The speech of the Recorder of the City of London (Edward Drew), made before Queen Elizabeth at the time of Buckle's oath-taking, is preserved in full. The oath was taken at the Tower, as in the previous year, because the plague increased at that time "very extreamly". Buckle's term, which commenced on the morrow of St Simon and St Jude (28/29 October), 1593, was marked by a virulent epidemic of plague: John Stow reckoned that in the 12 months leading up to 20 December 1593, soon after the start of Buckle's mayoralty, 10,675 people had died of the Plague within the City and Liberties. In consequence, on 3 February 1593/94, the Privy Council instructed him to order all of the theatres of London closed. It has been conjectured that Buckle came to an agreement with two Councillors, Lord Howard and Henry Carey, for a permanent ban on the use of city inns for plays.

An outstanding affair in Buckle's mayoralty was the discovery of a conspiracy to assassinate Queen Elizabeth. Her physician-in-chief, Dr Roderigo Lopes, a learned Portuguese man of Jewish heredity who lived as a Christian in England, had served her for many years and had established himself successfully. Through 1593 he became implicated in a web of conspiracy in which he appeared to have plotted to poison the queen in expectation of a large reward from foreign powers. His associates being brought to confession, and various letters being discovered, Lopes, with two others, faced his indictment for High Treason at the London Guildhall on 27 February 1593/1594 and was condemned on 28 February. There, among the commissioners headed by Sir Cuthbert Buckle, Lord Mayor in his domain, to hear Sir Edward Coke's prosecution, we see his name in company with the most powerful of his age, Sir John Puckering, Lord Burghley, the Earl of Essex, Admiral Lord Howard, Lord Buckhurst, Lord Rich, Sir Thomas Heneage, Sir John Popham, Sir Robert Cecil and Sir John Fortescue, and (among various others), Sir Richard Martin, who four months later succeeded Buckle in his office. Lopes and his colleagues were hanged, drawn and quartered at Tyburn on 7 June 1594.

A letter to the Privy Council of 2 May 1594 expresses Buckle's unhappy relations with his Sheriffs (Paul Banning and Peter Houghton), who took it upon themselves to have the choice and disposition of various city offices which were not in their gift, and to expel and replace a candidate for the office of Secondary who had been chosen at the Queen's commendation. He concluded:

"Wherein they have dealt in more violent sort, and with greater disturbance of the quiet estate and peace of this city, than ever did any that carried that office, both of them, but especially Mr. Bannyng, denying unto me the ordinary attendance due to my place, to the great offence of the better sort, and evil example of the whole city, by open contempt not so much of myself, as of order and magistracy. I have opposed myself by all lawful ways against their proceedings, wherein I hope you will vouchsafe me your lawful and honourable assistance."

Richard Robinson, a citizen of London, and a "large writer in prose and verse", in 1587 produced an English translation of a religious work - an exposition of Psalm 87 - written originally in Latin by Urbanus Rhegius, the Lutheran pastor of Celle ("Zella") in Lower Saxony, in 1536; this was dedicated to Sir George Barne as Lord Mayor. It was reprinted in 1590, and again by Richard Jones of London in 1594. The work advocated the preaching of the Gospel universally. The 1594 edition directed its dedication to Sir Cuthbert Buckle as Lord Mayor. It appears that Robinson was urgently seeking the approval of patrons, having been unjustly accused of theft.

=== Death and burial ===
Buckle died on 1 July 1594, shortly after having transferred as alderman to the Bassishaw ward, but before completing his term of office as mayor. He was probably a victim of the plague, as in his will he wrote that he was "deseased in body". He was buried on 29 July in a heraldic funeral, as a Baron, at St Mary-at-Hill church in Billingsgate ward, under the supervision of Richard Lee, Clarenceux King of Arms, assisted by the Lancaster and Somerset Heralds. His civic funeral was a costly display, and the order for the mourners shows Sir Richard Martin as chief mourner: his procession has been described as "a model of the order of society, expressing very clearly a view of the hierarchy of wealth, rank and office." His term as mayor was completed by Richard Martin, who in 1589 had served his first term as mayor in completing that of Sir Martin Calthorpe, under similar circumstances.

=== Heraldry ===
Sir Cuthbert Buckle bore arms, "Sable, a chevron between three chaplets argent", with crest "Out of a coronet a demi-ounce argent". The record of this in the College of Arms has a note, "The Armes and Creast were ratified and confirmed to be auncient armes and Crest appertayning to the Buckles as appeareth by a Pattent given to Sr Cuthbert Buckle Kt. Lord Mayor of London by Robert Cooke Clarenceaux King of Armes under his hand and seale 29 January a^{o} 1579", which was written retrospectively, for Buckle was not yet Lord Mayor in 1579. Robert Cooke was Clarenceux King of Arms from 1567 to 1594.

== Legacy ==
Buckle was a generous benefactor to the poor of various London parishes, and to the prison inmates, and also to the town of Brough, Westmorland, both in life and in his will.

=== South Stainmore chapel and school ===
By his will, Sir Cuthbert Buckle left a rent charge of £8 out of the Spittle estate near Bowes, and lands thereto belonging, to support a schoolmaster at Stainmore, to teach children "to read, write, cypher and cast account." This outlying part of Brough was too far from the town for its children to attend the school at Brough, or for the population to attend the parish church there. Accordingly a schoolhouse was built at South Stainmore which was also used by the local residents for divine service. Sir Cuthbert's will was contested on behalf of his heir, Christopher Buckle (1586-1660/1661), then still a minor, but the bequest was confirmed. A bill to establish the charity was presented in Chancery between Henry Blenkinsopp and Roger Salkeld, clerk, as plaintiffs and John Alderson, Christopher Buckle and George Utley as defendants. By 1608 Bishop Robinson consecrated the building as a chapel dedicated to St Stephen, in which the schoolmaster's classes could be held. In the Commonwealth Survey of 1657 it was reported that the endowment of Stainmore chapel belonged to the school, but there was no maintenance for a minister. Lands were settled in trust to maintain a schoolmaster clergyman in 1699.

=== Gift to the Vintners ===
Buckle's will included a gift to the master and wardens of the Vintners' Company of all his lands, hereditaments and tenements in the parishes of St Mary-at-Hill and St Dunstan-in-the-East, to remain to them after the deaths of his widow their son. Out of the rents arising, the Company was to pay forever £40 per annum to John and Anne Bennett and their heirs, £4 yearly to the needy parishioners of St Sepulchre and of St Mary-at-Hill, and 50 shillings a year to the needy parishioners of St Leonard, Eastcheap. Buckle's son, Sir Christopher, lived down to 1660 or 1661. The Vintners kept a record of the will, but seem never to have held property in St Mary at Hill or in St Dunstan's-in-the-East, and there is no record of any such payments. It has been inferred that the Company declined the bequest.

=== Children and descendants ===
Sir Cuthbert Buckle married first, in January 1563/64, to Johan (Joan) Davye, at St Mary Woolnoth's in London. Their son was

- John Buckle, who died in the lifetime of his father.

He married secondly Elizabeth Marston, the widow of George Utley (died 1579) by whom she had two sons,

- George Utley, citizen and Draper of London, and
- John Utley, gent., who was buried at Mitcham, Surrey, in 1617.

The son of Sir Cuthbert and Dame Elizabeth was:

- (Sir) Christopher Buckle, who died c. 1661, was baptized in August 1586 and had not reached majority in 1594. He married Catherine daughter of Sir Martin Barnham (and sister of Sir Francis Barnham) of Hollingbourne in Kent. He established his family at Banstead in Surrey, where manorial premises were conveyed to him by William Morland in 1614. These remained to his descendants into the 19th century.

=== Dame Elizabeth ===
He was survived, very briefly, by his wife Dame Elizabeth (nee Marston), whose will came to probate in October 1594. She was buried near her husband on 4 November. Dame Elizabeth being the sole executrix of her husband's will, and the son Christopher being in minority, various issues over his inheritance soon arose. In February 1594/1595 this was a matter under consideration by the Lord Mayor John Spencer and Aldermen, in correspondence with Sir Robert Cecil.

Some account of his descendants is to be found in the catalogue description of the "Buckle Papers", an extensive family archive held in the West Sussex Record Office. Among their descendants was Sarah Crowe, wife of John Carpenter, 4th Earl of Tyrconnell.

=== The Russian embassy of 1600-1601 ===
In his will, Buckle refers to his mansion house in Mark Lane, in the parish of St Mary-at-Hill, which is believed to have been his principal city residence. After his death the house is mentioned in 1600 when it was used as the temporary residence of the Russian embassy from the court of Boris Godunov, Tsar of Russia, led by Grigory Ivanovich Mikulin. The company, who presented an exotic appearance, arrived in September 1600 and had their first public audience at Richmond Palace in October following. On 20 September 1600, Rowland Whyte reported to Sir Robert Sydney, Governor of Flushing,

"Here arrived Yesterday, an Embassador from the Emperor of Russia; Sir William Russell was sent to Gravesend to greet hym, and my Lord Harbert of Cardiffe, was sent by the Queene, to receve hym at Towre Hill. He lodges at Alderman Buckleys Howse, and here is a speciall Care taken, to make hym see he is welcome; he continues here all this winter."

Civic offices
Preceded by William Rowe	Lord Mayor of London; 1593–1594	Succeeded by Richard Martin
