= Nicholas Marston =

English priest

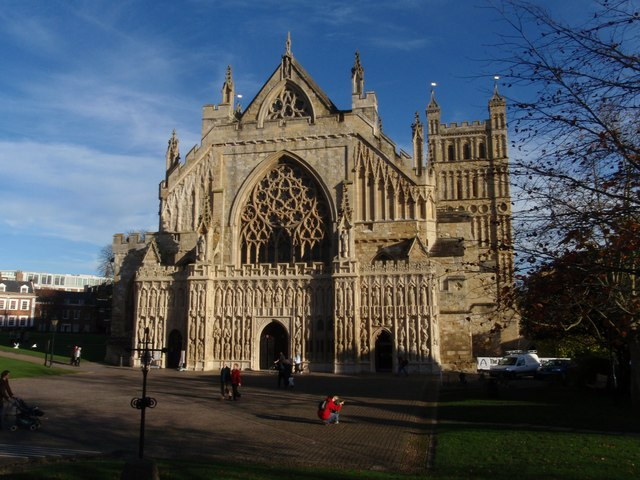
Exeter Cathedral, headquarters of the Marston brothers

Nicholas Marston (died 14 May 1624) was a 16th century English priest. It is uncertain whether his appointment as Archdeacon of Cornwall in 1574 took effect. He was one of three brothers (at least two of whom attended the University of Oxford), who had ecclesiastical careers in the Cathedral church of Exeter, and in that diocese within Cornwall and Devon. Their father was a wealthy citizen Haberdasher in the city of London who gave financial support to the early career of his wife's brother William Bradbridge, later bishop of Exeter. Thomas's daughters made advantageous City marriages, and the network of their mercantile patronage and relations with the bishops, deans and chapters of Exeter and of Bath and Wells, and with the University of Oxford, spanned several decades of the Tudor and early Stuart period.

== Life ==
=== Background and Education ===
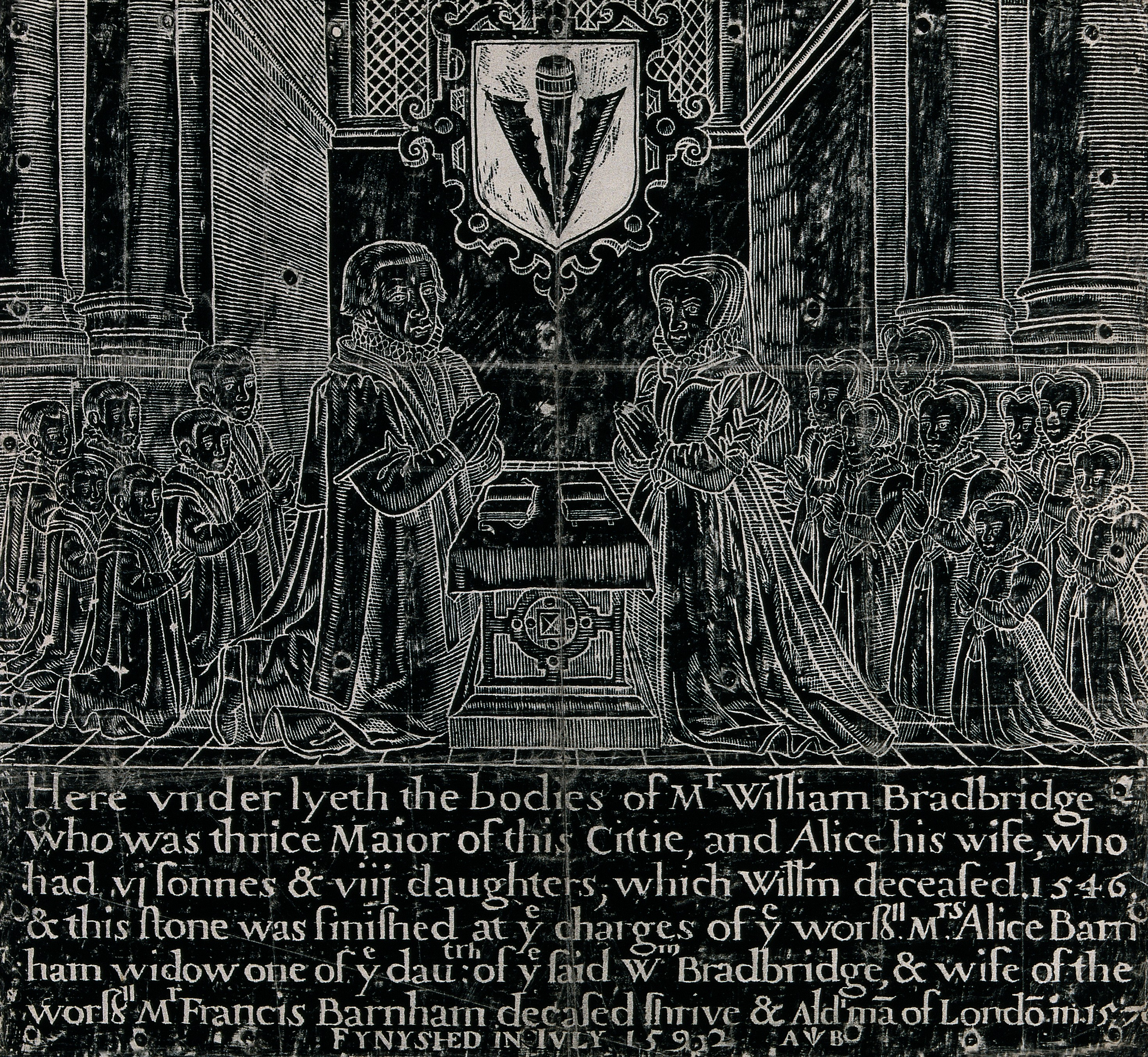
Brass memorial (rubbing) to William Bradbridge of Chichester (died 1546) and family, erected by his daughter Alice Barnham in 1592 (Wellcome Images)

Nicholas Marston was the second son of Thomas Marston, citizen and Haberdasher and Merchant Adventurer of London, probably by his wife Sybill (since that name was given to at least three granddaughters): his elder brother William was born c. 1544. Sybill was certainly the wife of Thomas in 1557, when Robert Austyn, Grocer, received licence to grant his messuage and lands in St Mary Colechurch to them and their heirs. Sybill was a sister of William Bradbridge of Chichester, the future bishop of Exeter (as shown by Henry Chauncy), and is claimed as "my sister Marston" in the will of Alice Barnham, née Bradbridge. Thomas Marston acquired his property at The Bell in St Stephen Coleman Street in 1545.

The Composition Books of the Office of First Fruits and Tenths show that Thomas Marston, Haberdasher, of St Mary Colechurch, London, with William Bradbridge, mercer (thrice mayor of Chichester, died 1546), stood surety for compositions on behalf of William Bradbridge (future bishop) for the vicarage of East Dean, West Sussex, in 1541; for the chantry of Northiam, Sussex, also 1541; and, with Francis Barnham, Draper, for West Thorney in Sussex in 1547. Francis Barnham married Alice Bradbridge (daughter of mercer William), at about this time. In the 2nd and 3rd years of Edward VI, Marston was churchwarden of St Mary Colechurch, and was of St Mildred, Poultry, for a composition for Bradbridge for St Mary's Hospital, Chichester, in August 1554. In December 1558 Thomas Marston and Frances Barnham were two of the group of six Guildsmen commoners deputed by the Court of Aldermen to prepare the section of Queen Elizabeth's coronation route around the Great Conduit in Cheap.

These connections go some way to explain the advances of Marston's sons in the diocese of Exeter under Bradbridge's jurisdiction over the following decades. Nicholas was educated at Christ Church, Oxford, graduating BA on 1 February 1564/65 and MA 9 July 1567.

=== William, Nicholas and Vincent Marston ===
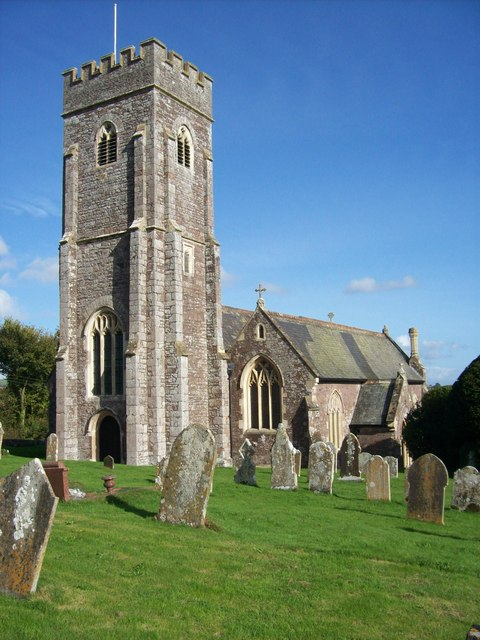
St Swithin's church, Shobrooke

The elder brother of Nicholas, William Marston, after some study at the University of Cambridge, was presented in April 1560 (aged 16) to the rectory of Shobrooke, Devon, by his father Thomas Marston of the city of London (to whom in 1549 Bishop John Vesey had assigned the next presentation). This institution was performed with John Incent as Marston's proxy, under the jurisdiction of Matthew Parker, during the vacancy in the see of Exeter created by the deposition of Bishop Turberville, who had refused the oath of supremacy. (Thomas Marston had attempted to present Richard Prestwood in 1555, but a caveat was entered.) At William Bradbridge's succession to that bishopric (1571–1578), William Marston (the elder brother) was collated a prebendary of St Peter's Cathedral church of Exeter in May 1571, received the rectory of Bridestowe with Sourton in June 1571, and his appointment as precentor of Exeter Cathedral on 19 December of that year, at which time he held the degree of Bachelor of Laws (LL.B.).

Nicholas, then, the second brother, was collated under Bradbridge in June 1571 to the perpetual vicarage of St Gluvias with the free chapel of Budock, and in February 1571/72 as prebendary of Exeter Cathedral, being installed in the rectory of Clayhidon one month later. In May 1572 he supplicated at Oxford for the degree of Bachelor of Divinity, but was not admitted. The Crown added the rectory of Exbourne in July 1572, and as residentiary canon of Exeter he therefore vacated St Gluvias in December 1572. On 10 June 1574 he was installed Archdeacon of Cornwall, at the presentation of his father Thomas Marston of London. However this appointment may have been provisional or adjuvant, for Thomas Somaster had been presented to that office by the Crown in 1570, and it was by the death of Somaster in 1603 that it next became vacant. Nicholas Marston supplicated for B.D. again on 19 March 1574/75, and again Christ Church did not admit him, nor several other applicants (including John Woolton), to the degree.

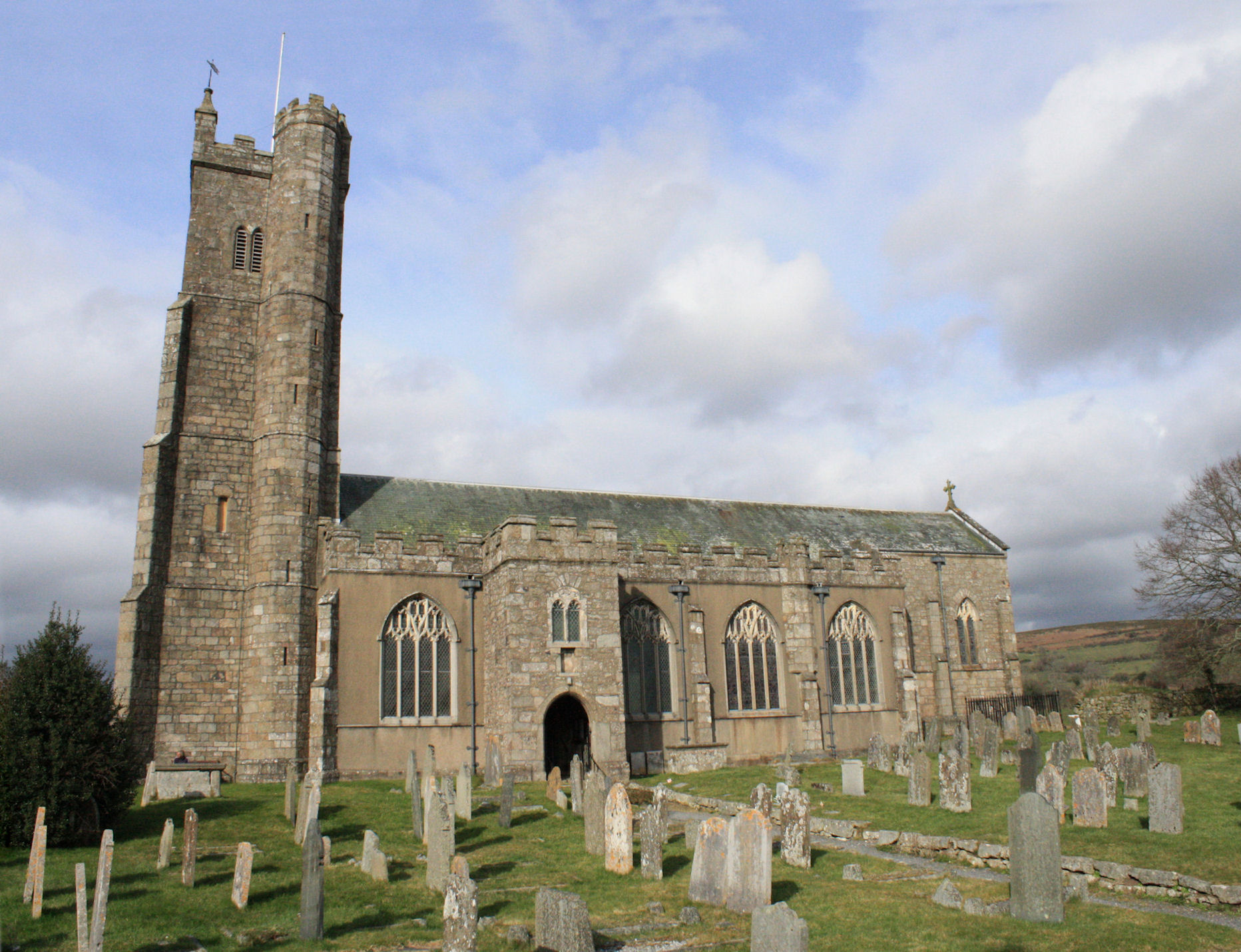
St Andrew, Moretonhampstead, of which Nicholas Marston was rector for 43 years (1581–1624)

The third brother, Vincent Marston, was an exhibitioner at Oriel College, Oxford in November 1567, but he had left his place there by March 1568/69, and took his BA from St Alban's Hall (Merton College, Oxford) on 16 February 1570/71. Vincent's ordination as deacon on 27 September 1572, and as priest on 29 September, took place in his brother William's parish church of Shobrooke. He became chaplain of Exeter College, Oxford on 12 October 1572 and graduated MA on 1 July 1573. In July 1576 Sir Gavin Carew presented him to the living of Clare, one of the four portions of the church of Tiverton, and on 12 December 1576, in pleno jure, William Bradbridge collated him to the rectory of Lezant, Cornwall (which the bishop held in commendam). Appointed a canon of Exeter Cathedral, Marston resigned the chaplaincy of Exeter College, and held Lezant until 1581.

Their father Thomas Marston, the haberdasher Edmond Calthorp and grocer John Wanton, were in 1576 deemed to be "men well acquainted with the manner of exchanges and rechanges, to and from the City of London, and to and from foreign parts"; they were formally appointed to issue warrants to all persons for any such exchange and rechange of coin, under their own signatures or handwriting. Marston died in 1581 naming his three sons his successive heirs subject to lifetime tenures by his widow Sybill, the escheator finding William Marston, aged 30 and above (37, if 16 in 1560), to be principal heir.

In 1581 Nicholas gave up Clayhidon and, under patronage of Sir William Courtney, became rector of Moretonhampstead, Devon, and held it until his death 43 years later. In the same year, Vincent Marston was presented to the rectory of Lanreath, Cornwall, by his brother William the precentor of Exeter, to whom the advowson had been granted by Sibilla Trevanian of St Michael Caerhays. A vacancy is reported in the rectory of Lanreath in October 1583, after which Vincent's name appears only (as of Lezant) in a burial record for Lanrethon, pointing to his death late in 1583. In 1584 William Marston was installed as Rector of Caerhays Stephens (St Stephen-in-Brannel) with the chapelry of St Dennis, in Cornwall, Bishop John Woolton and the Crown being patrons.

=== Merchant kinsfolk and bishop Godwin ===
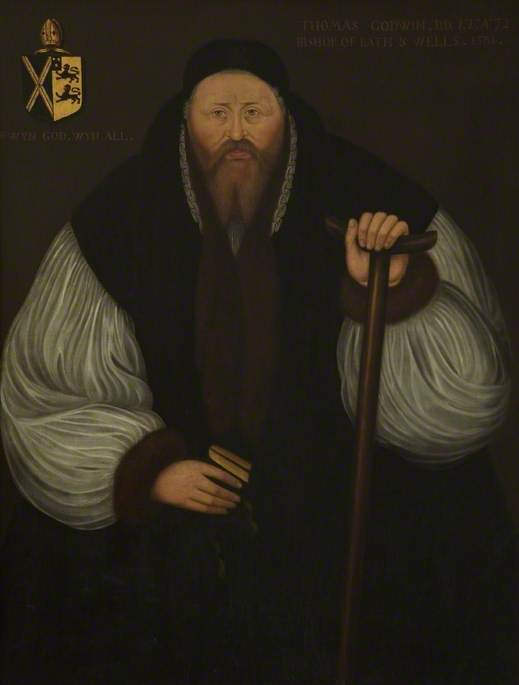
Bishop Godwin of Bath and Wells

In 1584 Thomas Godwin (of Wokingham, Berkshire), who had been Dean of Christ Church in Oxford in 1565–67, was appointed Bishop of Bath and Wells. His son Francis Godwin, the historian, also studied at Christ Church and became subdean of Exeter in 1587: his brother Matthew Godwin became Master of Music at Canterbury and Exeter but died aged 17 in 1588 and has his monument at Exeter. In July 1587 Sir George Carew sought the release of some lands from the Dean and Chapter of Exeter, to which William and Nicholas Marston and four others, for the Chapter, sent a favourable response to Lord Burghley.

In mid-1589, at Godwin's mandate, William Marston the precentor was admitted and installed to the prebend of Combe I, as a prebendary of Wells Cathedral. William Marston's last Exonian preferment was to Silverton, Devon, in June 1592. He died in 1599, and in his will is styled "Dr", "LL.D", making his brother Nicholas his executor. His office of precentor, with his canonicate, were granted to bishop William Cotton: they passed to the bishop's son William in 1607. Bishop Cotton also accepted the rectories of Silverton and Shobrooke, which later passed to his sons William and Edward Cotton respectively.

Bishop Godwin, a widower at his succession to Bath and Wells in 1584, had soon married a second wife, a widow of London named Sibyll, who died late in 1587 and was buried at Banwell in North Somerset. Godwin made the centre of his operations at Banwell and built a grand mansion there, named Ockingham House. The parish register records:

"1587. Sibyll, the wife of the Right Reverent Father in God Thomas Godwin by God's providence [died] 23 of ([? November]), buried the first of December."

This brief alliance had earned him the disapproval of Queen Elizabeth, upon rumours that she was much younger than him (though she had a son aged over 40), and that the "intempestive mariadge" was had for reasons of wealth. At his death in 1590 many of Godwin's possessions were dispersed informally to certain London merchants, including (notably) Peter Robinson, Salter, and John Johnson of Watling Street, Merchant Taylor. These men were immediate kinsmen, actually brothers-in-law, of Nicholas and William Marston. Robinson, who married Anne Marston, had been a witness in Thomas Marston's will of 1581. Johnson, Alice Marston's second husband, was an eminent Guildsman, being elected Master of the Merchant Taylors, and then presiding, at the company's feast attended ceremonially by King James I in 1607. Their involvement in Godwin's funeral, the dispersal of his estate, and their careful inventories of goods received, might be explained if Sybil Godwin was the former Sybil Marston, née Bradbridge.

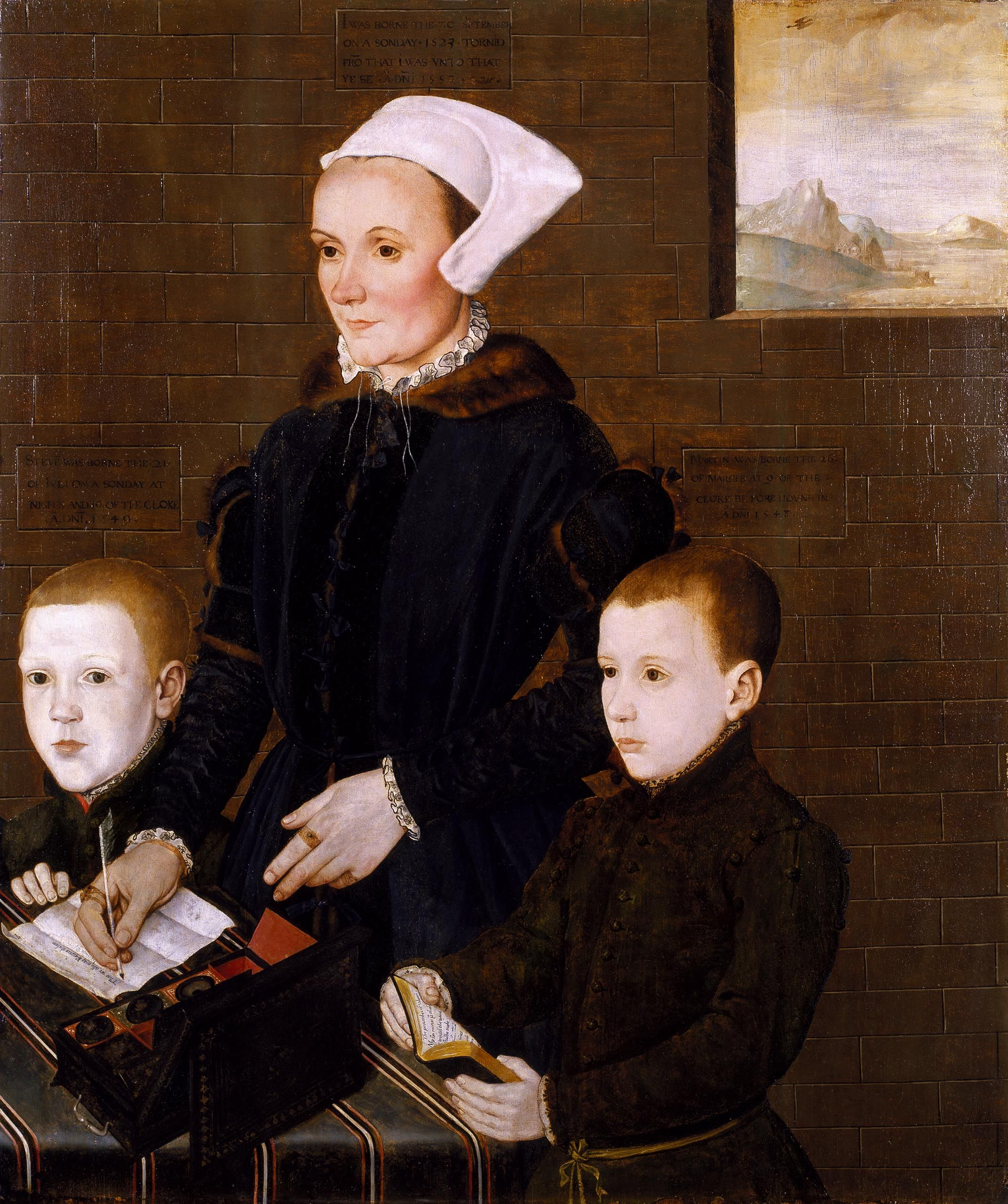
Alice Barnham and her sons Martin and Stephen, 1557

Another sister, Elizabeth Marston, first married George Utley, Draper of London (an associate of Robert Offley's), who died in 1579 leaving her with two sons. In around 1582 Elizabeth became the second wife of Sir Cuthbert Buckle, Lord Mayor of London in 1593-94: both died in 1594. In her will, Elizabeth referred (among many others) to her brothers and sisters, her aunt Alice Barnham, and to her cousins (Alice's sons) Stephen, Martin and Benedict Barnham. Francis Barnham, a prominent, wealthy Alderman and Sheriff, and Master Draper in 1568-69 and 1571–72, by his will of 1576 had remembered Thomas Marston, his wife and children, and among the trustees of a legacy to Christ's Hospital he had also named George Utley, Elizabeth Buckle's then husband. Christopher, the orphaned son of Cuthbert and Elizabeth Buckle, in his minority became the ward of Martin Barnham, and afterwards married Martin's daughter Catherina.

The tie of kinship underlying Bradbridge patronage towards the Marstons is reiterated by Benedict Barnham, Alderman and Sheriff in 1591, in his will of 1597, and by Alice Barnham herself:

"I give to Anne Robinson, Alice Johnson and Susan Levynge, the daughters of my late sister Marstone, to every of them the some of ten pounds... [and] ...unto George Utley and John Utley, unto either of them a black gowne."

=== Later life, and death ===
Nicholas Marston married a wife named Susan and had a daughter Sibilla, whose married name was Hyde. In December 1597 he was granted a dispensation by the Faculty Office to be a "preacher of God's word", as vicar of St Marychurch, Exeter. The Archdeaconry of Cornwall was awarded to William Hutchinson on 5 September 1603: but Marston held the rectory of Exbourne until 1619, and was holding the rectory of Moretonhampstead and the vicarage of St Marychurch as canon and prebendary of Exeter at his death on 14 May 1624. By his brief will, dated 1 October 1611, he gave to Sibilla the lands he had lately purchased lying outside the East Gate of Exeter in the parish of St Sidwell: Allan Hyde, probably his son-in-law, was one of the witnesses. The will was proved in June 1624 by his widow Susan Marston.
