= Anthony Sparrow =

English bishop and academic (1612–1685)

Rt Rev Dr Anthony Sparrow DD
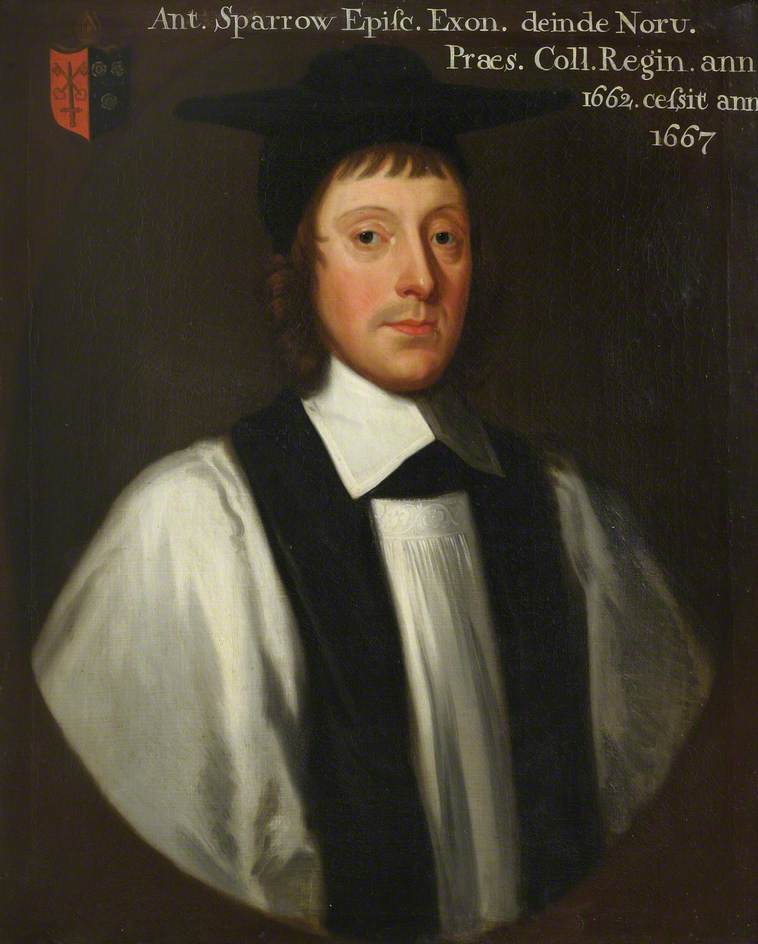

Bishop of Norwich
- In office 1676–1685
- Preceded by: Edward Reynolds
- Succeeded by: William Lloyd

Bishop of Exeter
- In office 1667–1676
- Preceded by: Seth Ward
- Succeeded by: Thomas Lamplugh

Vice-Chancellor of the University of Cambridge
- In office 1664–1665
- Preceded by: James Fleetwood
- Succeeded by: Francis Wilford

President of Queens' College, Cambridge
- In office 1662–1667
- Preceded by: Thomas Horton
- Succeeded by: William Wells

Personal details
- Born: May 1612 Depden, Suffolk, England
- Died: 19 May 1685 (aged 72–73) Norwich
- Resting place: Norwich Cathedral
- Spouse: Susanna Orell
- Children: 9
- Education: Queens' College, Cambridge
- Occupation: Bishop

Anthony Sparrow (May 1612 – 19 May 1685) was prominent as both a theologian and academic at the University of Cambridge and as a cleric in the Church of England. He was President of Queens' College, Cambridge, Vice-Chancellor of the University of Cambridge and Bishop of both Exeter and Norwich. He is known for his resistance to the imposition of Presbyterianism by Oliver Cromwell, his involvement in the conflict between Simon Patrick and King Charles II regarding academic freedom and the right of colleges to elect their heads, and for his theological treatises, in particular A Rationale upon the Book of Common Prayer.

== Early life ==
Born at Depden Hall, Depden, Suffolk, in 1612, he was the son of Samuel Sparrow, a wealthy farmer.

== Academic career ==
He graduated with a BA degree (1628/9), followed by an MA (1632), a BD (1639) and DD (1661), all from Queens' College, Cambridge. In 1633 he was appointed a fellow of the college and over the next decade served as both Dean and Bursar and taught Hebrew and Greek.

On 18 April 1644 he and around 60 other fellows were ejected from their colleges by Edward Montagu, 2nd Earl of Manchester after Parliament passed a law reforming the University. Among other things, it required fellows to be resident at their colleges, which Sparrow was not. The reforms were contentious given the political climate of the English Civil War and the Royalist loyalties of the University. The issue of residency appears to have been an excuse to rid the University of those who refused to adopt the Covenant which was part of the Parliamentarians' efforts to enforce Presbyterianism in England. Sparrow suffered substantial economic hardship as a result of the removal of his right to work as an academic.

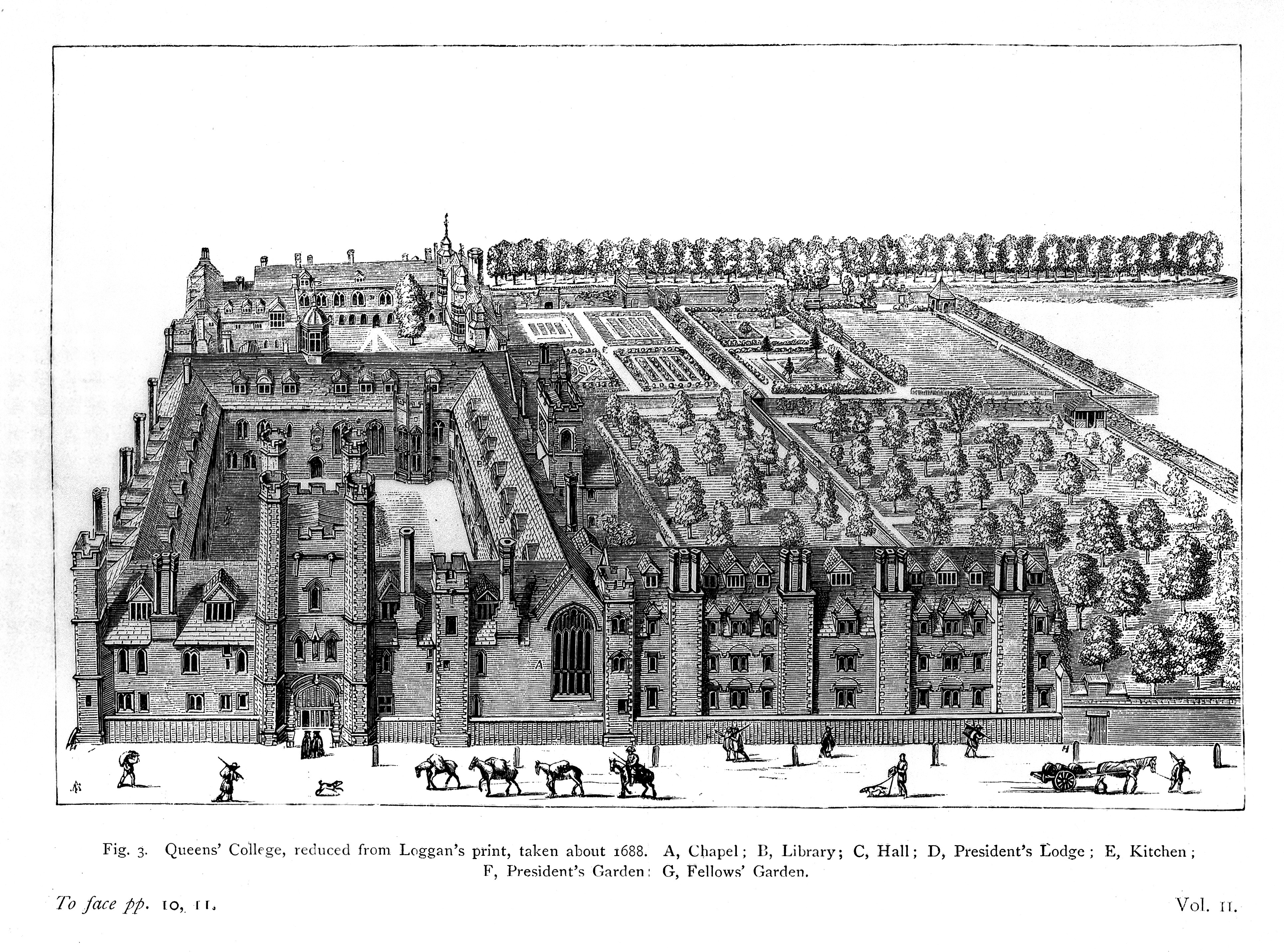
Queens' College, Cambridge, c1688

Following The Restoration, in 1662 he was proposed for the position of President (master) of Queens' College, but the process of appointment became embroiled in controversy around the academic freedom of the college to elect its president. The election of the president was arranged for 6 May 1662, Anthony Sparrow being one of two candidates. He was supported by the senior fellows, while his opponent, Simon Patrick, his junior in the college, was nominated by junior fellows. The College Statutes stated that the fellows should elect the president, but midway through the election procedure a mandamus from the King was read out advising that Sparrow was appointed. He accepted, but Patrick objected leading to a controversy that endured for two years. The King appointed a Commission to investigate the matter, but Patrick alleged that his supporters were not given proper opportunity to present arguments in his favour. He challenged the process in court, but after two years of litigation the court remained evenly divided on the matter and Patrick dropped the case.

Anthony Sparrow served as President of the College until 1667 and was Vice-Chancellor of the University in 1664-5.

== Clerical career ==
He was ordained as a priest at Ely on 22 February 1634/1635, but did not take up a parish as he was already a fellow of Queens' College. He was an adherent to Laudianism.

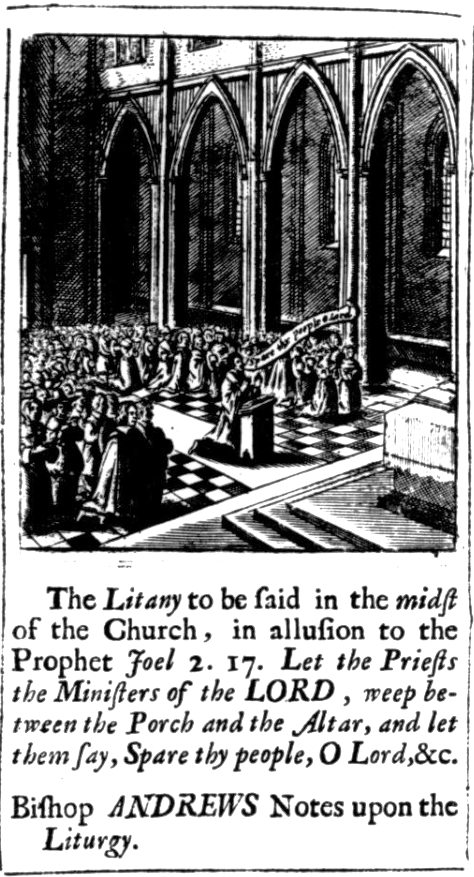
Frontispiece to the 1668 edition of Antony Sparrow's A Rationale upon the Book of Common Prayer

In 1647, following his expulsion from Cambridge, Joseph Hall, the Bishop of Norwich, appointed him as Rector of Hawkedon, Suffolk. However, after only five weeks he was ejected for using the Book of Common Prayer, a practice which had been banned following the reforms resulting from the Civil War.

From 1644 to 1660 he was effectively prevented from working as either a priest or academic. According to J. H. Gray, author of a history of Queens' College, "during this period...he skulk'd from one place to another". However, Augustus Jessop, in his history of the Diocese of Norwich, claims that that he lived on his family estate at Depden.

During this time, in 1655, he published a collection of his articles on the subject of Anglican doctrine and orders of service under the title A Rationale upon the Book of Common Prayer which remained banned throughout the period of Oliver Cromwell's rule in England. It subsequently became an influential work that is still in print to this day.

Following The Restoration he began his rise through the ranks of the clergy commencing in 1660 with his reinstatement as Rector of Hawkendon, a position he retained until 1667. On 7 August 1660 he was appointed Archdeacon of Sudbury in Suffolk and on 15 April 1663, Canon and 2nd Prebend of Ely in Cambridgeshire, serving there until he was raised to Bishop in 1667. He participated in the Savoy Conference of 1661. In the 1660s he also served as Chaplain to King Charles II and held a preachership at Bury St Edmunds.

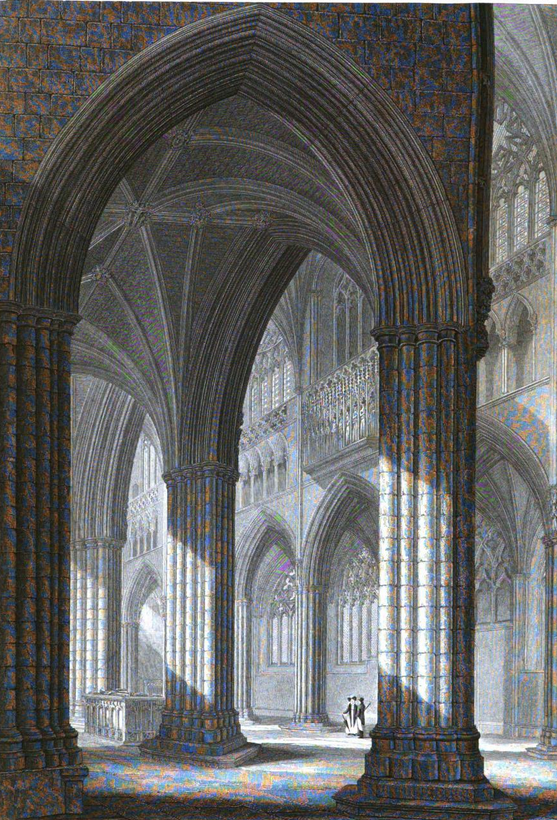
View across the nave of Exeter Cathedral

On 3 November 1667 he was consecrated Bishop of Exeter where he served until 1676 when he was translated to Bishop of Norwich. He retained that position until his death in Norwich on 19 May 1685.

== Personal life ==
In 1645 Anthony Sparrow married Susanna Orell. They had nine children. He left several daughters as his co-heiresses, one of whom was Joan Sparrow (d. 1703), wife of Edward Drew (d. 1714) of The Grange, Broadhembury, Devon, a Canon of Exeter Cathedral.

Sparrow died in Norwich on 29 May 1685 and is buried in Norwich Cathedral.

== Publications ==
- A Sermon Concerning Confession of Sins, and the Power of Absolution (1637)
- A Rationale on the Book of Common Prayer of the Church of England (1655)
- "A Collection of Articles, Injunctions, Canons, Orders, Ordinances, and Constitutions Ecclesiastical, with other Publik Records of The Church of England, Chiefly in the Times of K. Edward. VIth. Q. Elizabeth. and K. James." ...Published to Vindicate The Church of England and to promote Uniformity and peace in the same. (1661; London, Printed by R. Norton for Timothy Garthwait at the Little North-doore of St. Paul's Church 1661)

Church of England titles
Preceded by Seth Ward	Bishop of Exeter; 1667–1676	Succeeded by Thomas Lamplugh
Preceded by Edward Reynolds	Bishop of Norwich; 1676–1685	Succeeded by William Lloyd
