= Chris Hardwick (disambiguation) =

Chris Hardwick (born 1971) is an American comedian.

Chris Hardwick may also refer to:

- Chris Hardwick (speedcuber) (born 1983), American competitive speedcuber
- Chris Hardwick (priest) (born 1957), British religious leader

== See also ==
- Hardwick
