= All Saints' Church, Falmouth =

Church in Cornwall, England

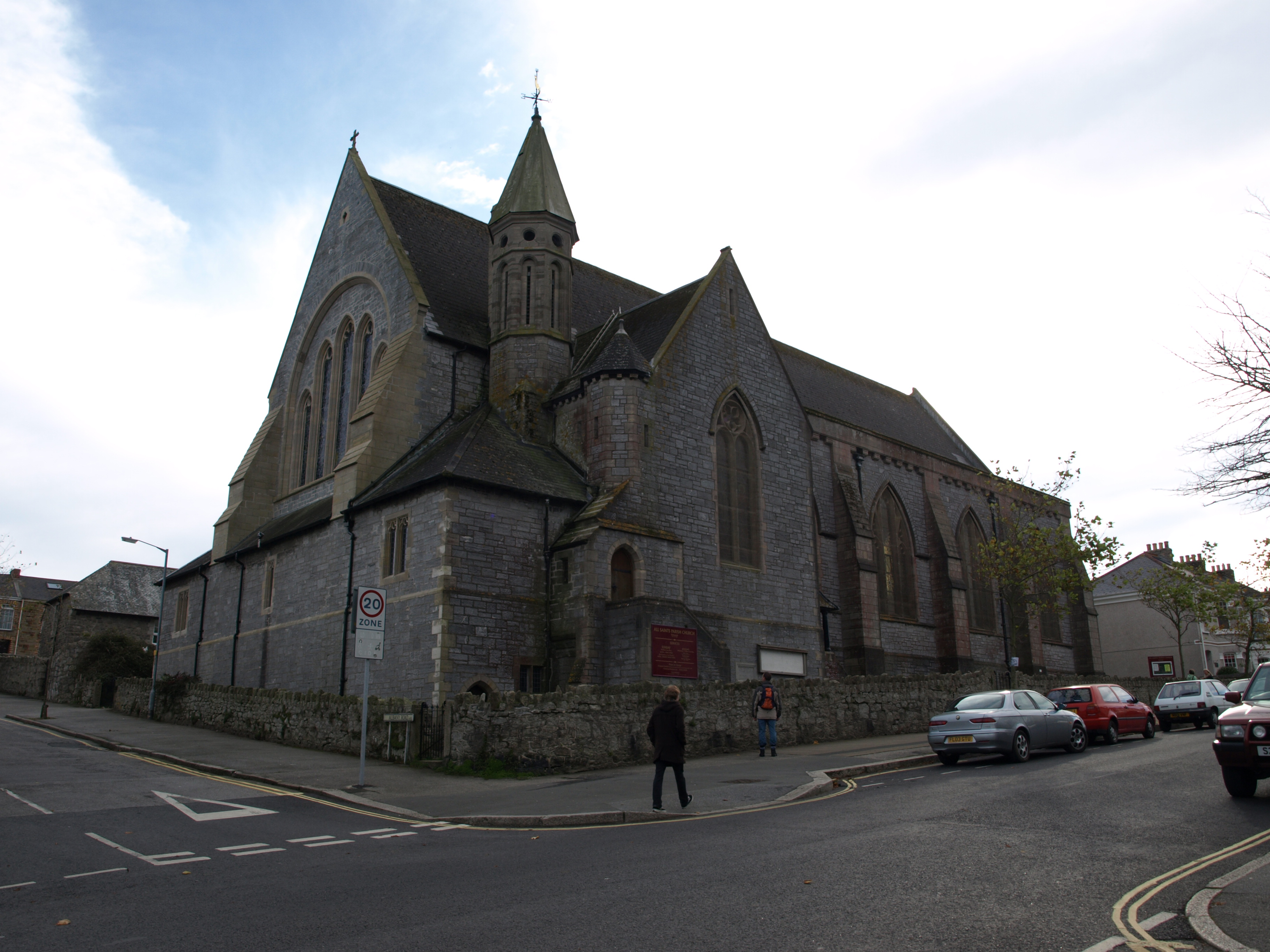
- All Saints' Church, Falmouth
- All Saints' Church, Falmouth
- 50°09′04″N 05°04′35″W
- OS grid reference: SW 802 325
- Denomination: Church of England
- Churchmanship: High Church
- Website: http://www.allsaintschurchfalmouth.co.uk/

History
- Dedication: All Saints

Administration
- Province: Canterbury
- Diocese: Truro
- Archdeaconry: Cornwall
- Deanery: Carnmarth South
- Parish: Falmouth, Cornwall

Clergy
- Vicar: Parish in Transition

Listed Building – Grade II*
- Official name: Church of All Saints
- Designated: 23 January 1973
- Reference no.: 1270048

All Saints' Church, Falmouth is a parish church in the Church of England Diocese of Truro located in Falmouth, Cornwall, United Kingdom.

== History ==
The foundation stone was laid by Albert, Prince of Wales and Duke of Cornwall (later Edward VII) in 1887. The church was designed by the architect J. D. Sedding in the Gothic Revival style. The aisles are narrow and there is a large east window of five lancets.

The church was consecrated on 17 April 1890 by Herbert Bree, Bishop of Barbados, in place of George Wilkinson, Bishop of Truro, who was ill.

The church of All Saints was built 1887–90 to the designs of John Dando Sedding, uncle of Edmund Harold Sedding. Fittings designed by him include the oak choir stalls, carved by Trask & Co. and the Devon marble font. As was often the case, the nephew was called upon to take over after his uncle died. In 1895, Edmund H. Sedding was the obvious choice to design the magnificent alabaster and marble pulpit executed by J. & E. Goad of the Plymouth Phoenix Steam Marble Works (RCG, 1895). In 1908 he also designed the elaborate reredos for All Saints. This was one of the instances where the Pinwill workshop did not carry out the work and Harry Hems of Exeter was chosen instead (CRO P257/2/53-58) but there are many fine examples of Pinwill woodcarving at All Saints.

More can be read about the carvings here: http://www.pinwillwoodcarving.org.uk/catalogue.htm#_Toc462143494

== List of vicars ==
- Thomas Taylor 1890–92. First Vicar of the newly created parish.
- Montague Williamson, 1918–24. Subsequently Archdeacon of Bodmin, 1924–39.
- Canon Clifford William George Wood, 1924–63
- Raymond Lockwood Ravenscroft, 1964–68. Subsequently Archdeacon of Cornwall, 1988–96.
- Donald Young OBE, 1969–70
- Peter Eustice, 1971–76
- Prebendary Edwin George John Stark, 1977–80
- Albert Edmund Angus Murray-Stone, 1981–83
- Peter Watts, 1984–94
- James Stanley Scantlebury, 1994–98
- Stephen Drakeley, 1999-2016
- Bill Stuart-White, May 2018 – present

== Organ ==
A plan of the organ case at County Records Office is dated 1893 and illustrates the north side, facing into the chancel, and the west elevation, although the design is slightly different from what was produced.

The elaborate case encloses an organ by Hele & Co of Plymouth, built in 1894, said at the time to be second only to the one in Truro Cathedral (RCG, 1894). An article in the Royal Cornwall Gazette records a service of dedication for the new organ, and remarks that the case of oak is 'enhanced by fine carving, adding much to the beauty of the chancel'.

Most of the instrument is the one originally constructed for this church by Hele & Co of Plymouth in 1894 at a cost of £750. At that time, the Choir and some slides on the Great and Swell were only "prepared for".

In 1926 it was given a clean and overhaul by Henry Speechly & Sons of London, who also added the Choir stops and soundboard, the reed stops at 16' and 4' on the Swell, 8' on the Great, and 16' on the Pedal. They also installed the electric blower to replace the hand blowing apparatus previously used.

In 1950, Roger Yates of Michaelstow cleaned all the pipe work, and added the Swell Tremolo, the Pedal 4' Nachthorn, and the pneumatic relay to enable the Pedal Quint to be derived from the Bourdon/Bass Flute rank.

The work carried out by Yates is regarded as some of the finest work in Cornwall. Yates was trained by Henry Willis III (of Henry Willis & Sons), he was a master of his craft, both through his work with Henry Willis and Sons and also in his own name. Yates was also responsible for the fine organ in Newquay Parish Church, lost in a fire in 1993. Another example of his work is that of the organ in Kilkhampton Parish Church.

When voicing the organ at All Saints' he made full use of the resonance of the building, he voiced the organ to the acoustic of the building rather than voicing it to his preferred choice.

Roger opened up the Great Diapason Chorus, pushing the pipework to its limit, (as was and is the Willis technique) thus creating a very bright and powerful chorus. The bright fifteenth (a Willis trademark) compensates for the lack of Great Mixture. The Twelfth and Fifteenth drawn together are a force not to be reckoned with, therefore making the chorus speak as if there were a Mixture in place.

Roger also blended and voiced the reeds, particularly the swell reeds. It is believed that his idea was to match the swell of the superb Father Willis organ of Truro Cathedral.

The organ has always been regarded as one of the finest in the county (and perhaps further afield) as it was stated to be second only to the one in Truro Cathedral (RCG, 1894), many notable organists have also made this statement.

In 2015 the organ was placed in the care of Henry Willis and Sons. When they took over the tuning contract they were almost certain that when Yates left the organ, he would most certainly have tuned it to the mysterious "Willis Scale".

=== List of organists ===
- 1890 W J Shoosmith
- 1903 Claire Cooper
- 1919 Francis Basset Rogers MA
- 1941 Ade Knocker ARCO
- 1946 Frederick J Herbert
- 1957 Leslie Millington
- c1962 Alan Hall B Mus FRCO
- c1970 Andrew Scrope-Shrapnel
- 1974 Michael Maine
- 1976 Alan Hall BMus FRCO
- 1980 John Clark
- 1990 Andrew Jenkins
- 1995 John Sherriff
- 2004 Roger King
- 2012 Matthew Seaton
- 2014 Daniel Shermon
