= Bill Stuart-White =

British Anglican priest

William Robert Stuart-White (born 1959) is a British Anglican priest. He was Archdeacon of Cornwall from 2012 until 15 May 2018, when he was installed rector of All Saints', Falmouth.

Stuart-White was educated at Merton College, Oxford. He was ordained deacon in 1986 and priest in 1987. After a curacy in Armley he was priest in charge at Austrey. He then served at Camborne, Linkinhorne, St Breock and Egloshayle before his appointment as archdeacon.

In 2022 he was involved in the discussion following objections being raised as regards the memorial to Thomas Corker a seventeenth century slave trader born in Falmouth, who had died whilst visiting Falmouth in 1700.

Church of England titles
Preceded by Roger Bush	Archdeacon of Cornwall; 2012–2018	Succeeded by TBA
