= Dean of Truro =

Head and chair of ruling body of Truro Cathedral

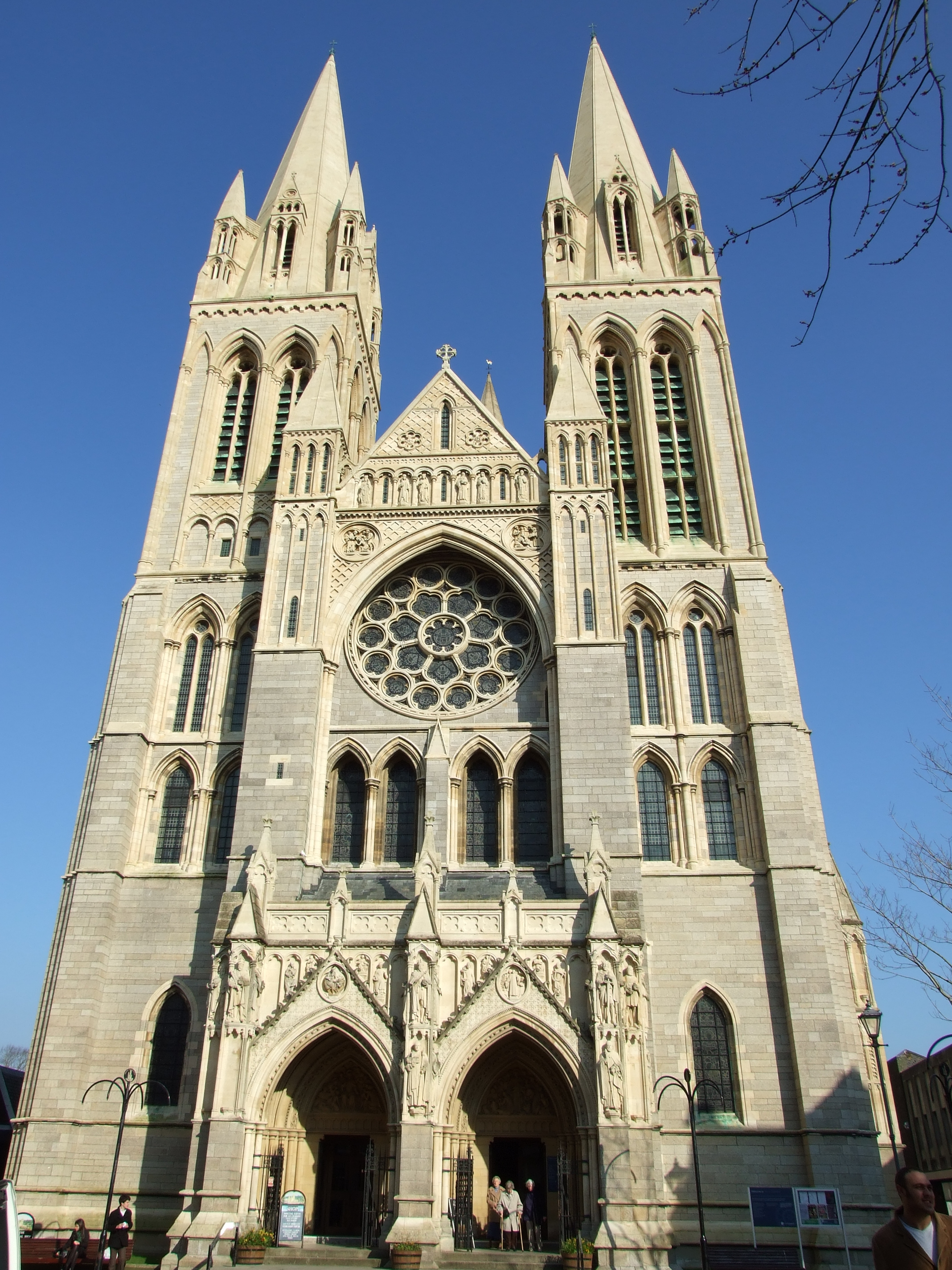
Truro Cathedral

The Dean of Truro is the head (primus inter pares – first among equals) and chair of the chapter of canons, the ruling body of Truro Cathedral. The dean and chapter are based at the Cathedral Church of the Blessed Virgin Mary in Truro. The cathedral is the mother church of the Diocese of Truro and seat of the Bishop of Truro.

== History of the Chapter ==
Upon the foundation of Truro Cathedral the bishop was authorised to establish honorary canonries which Dr, Benson did; these numbered 24. In 1878 a new act of Parliament authorised the bishop to establish residentiary canonries; in 1882 an existing canonry was transferred to Truro from Exeter whose income enabled the provision of two canonries at Truro. In 1906 the office of sub-dean was endowed; the bishop was also the dean (at least until 1925). This was the position until it became possible to fund the office of Dean.

== List of deans ==
- 1895-1910: Cecil Bourke
- 1952-1959: Joseph Fison
- 1960–1981: Henry Lloyd
- 1982–1997: David Shearlock
- 1998–2005: Michael Moxon
- 2005–2011: Chris Hardwick
- 2011–2012: Perran Gay (acting)
- 2012–2022: Roger Bush
- 2024–2026: Simon Robinson (Interim Dean 2022-2024)

2026-present: Alison Hogger Gadsby ("Interim Dean")
