= Edward Drew =

Edward Drew may refer to:

- Edward Drew (serjeant-at-law) (c. 1542–1598), English serjeant-at-law
- Edward Drew (priest) (died 1714), English Anglican priest
- Ed Drew (1865–1911), American rancher and lawman

== See also ==
- The Mystery of Edwin Drood, a novel by Charles Dickens
