= Robert Hall (priest) =

Anglican priest

Robert Hall, D.D. was an Anglican priest in England during the 17th century.

The son of Bishop Joseph Hall, he was educated at Emmanuel College, Cambridge and Exeter College, Oxford. Hall held livings at Stokeinteignhead and Clyst Hydon. He became a Canon Residentiary and Treasurer of Exeter Cathedral in 1629,. He was Archdeacon of Cornwall from 1633 to 1667. He died on 29 May 1667.

His brother George became Bishop of Chester.
