= Simon Robinson (bishop) =

British Anglican priest

The Right Reverend Simon Robinson SMMS
- Bishop of Warrington
- Church: Church of England
- Diocese: Diocese of Liverpool
- In office: 2026 to present
- Predecessor: Roger Bush
- Other post: Dean of Truro (2024–2026)

Orders
- Ordination: 2012 (deacon); 2013 (priest)
- Consecration: 30 April 2026 by Stephen Cottrell

Personal details
- Born: Simon Joseph Robinson; 17 August 1967 (age 59) Rugby
- Denomination: Anglicanism
- Education: University of Warwick; Southern Theological Education and Training Scheme

Simon Joseph Robinson (born 17 August 1967) is a British Anglican bishop. Since 2026, he has been Bishop of Warrington, a suffragan bishop in the Church of England's Diocese of Liverpool. He had served as Dean of Truro from 2024 until his appointment to the episcopate.

== Early life and education ==
Robinson was born on 17 August 1967 in Rugby and attended Lawrence Sheriff School. He studied education and music at the University of Warwick between 1985 and 1989, graduating with a Bachelor of Arts (BA) degree. He then worked as a teacher and headteacher of state schools in London and Bristol for 24 years, most recently serving as headteacher of Wendell Park Primary School, London, from 2001 and 2006 and as headteacher of Barton Hill Primary School, Bristol, from 2006 to 2013.

== Ordained ministry ==
He trained for ordained ministry through the Southern Theological Education and Training Scheme. He was ordained in the Church of England as a deacon in 2012 and as a priest in 2013. He served as a curate in the parish of Freshford, Limpley Stoke and Hinton Charterhouse in the Diocese of Bath and Wells, and was ordained as a priest in 2013. In 2015, he was appointed Vicar of Minehead.

In October 2022, he was appointed Canon Missioner at Truro Cathedral and interim Dean of Truro. His substantive appointment as Dean was announced on 17 August 2023. He was installed as Dean on 21 January 2024 by Hugh Nelson, the Bishop of St Germans.

He is a member of the Sodality of Mary, Mother of Priests, an Anglo-Catholic society.

On 27 March 2026, it was announced that he had been appointed the next Bishop of Warrington, a suffragan bishop in the Diocese of Liverpool. He was formally nominated on 13 April 2026. He was consecrated as a bishop by Stephen Cottrell, Archbishop of York, during a service in York Minster on 30 April 2026. He was then welcomed into his new diocese on 23 May 2026.

== Personal life ==
Robinson is an openly gay man.

Church of England titles
Preceded by Roger Bush	Dean of Truro; 2024 to 2026	Succeeded by TBC
Preceded by Bev Mason	Bishop of Warrington; 2026 to present	Incumbent
