= Fakenham Academy =

Fakenham Academy Norfolk and Fakenham Sixth Form

Location
- Fakenham, Norfolk; England; 52°50′27″N 0°50′39″E

Information
- Type: Academy
- Established: 1959
- Trust: Sapentia Education Trust
- Department for Education URN: 139572 Tables
- Ofsted: Reports
- Head Teacher: Gavin Green
- Gender: Coeducational
- Age: 11 to 19
- Enrollment: 781
- Capacity: 750
- Website: fakenhamacademynorfolk.org

The Fakenham Academy (formerly Fakenham Grammar School and Fakenham High School and College) is a coeducational secondary school and sixth form located at Field Lane Fakenham, Norfolk, England. The school offers GCSEs and BTECs as programmes of study. Pupils in the sixth form can choose to study from a range of A Levels and BTECs.

== History ==
The school gained academy status in 2013 after previously receiving an 'inadequate' rating in an Ofsted report. In the most recent Ofsted inspection (2019), Fakenham Academy was rated as a "Good" school. The original multi academy trust was the TEN group, but it moved to the Sapientia Education Trust in June 2020.

=== Wells Road ===
The sixth form used to occupy the detached Wells Road site. The college was set in the grade II-listed Highfield House, a Georgian building set in spacious grounds. It was built in 1823 as a private villa. one hundred years later, in September 1923, it was converted into an all-boys secondary school which in 1946, after the introduction of the Education Act 1944, became Fakenham Grammar School.

In 2003, part of the building was destroyed in a fire. In 2017, the Wells Road site was relealesed to housing. Matthew Parr-Burman, principal said, “As much as we are all very fond of the historic Wells Road building, it sadly no longer provides a suitable environment in which to learn and costs a huge amount to maintain,”

== Academics ==
A limiting fact is the temporary reduced number of students in the current cohorts.

=== Curriculum ===
Virtually all maintained schools and academies follow the National Curriculum, and are inspected by Ofsted on how well they succeed in delivering a 'broad and balanced curriculum'. The school has to decide whether Key Stage 3 contains years 7, 8 and 9- or whether year 9 should be in Key Stage 4 and the students just study subjects that will be examined by the GCSE exams at 16. Fakenham has chosen the former approach. In Key Stage 3, students are taught in mixed ability bands in all subjects and within ability groups in Mathematics. Support groups exist in English, Mathematics, Science and Humanities. In Key Stage 4, students are taught in ability groups in Mathematics, banded ability groups within English and Science and in mixed ability classes in option subjects.

Key Stage 3

From Year 7 to Year 9, students study art, Design and Technology, Drama, English, French, Geography, History, Learning for Life, Mathematics, Music, Physical Education, Science and Spanish.

Key Stage 4

All students study the core subjects of English Language GCSE, English Literature GCSE, Mathematics GCSE, Learning for Life, PE and Science GCSE Triple Science comprising Biology GCSE, Chemistry GCSE and Physics GCSE or Combined Science. Students have four options choices that include GCSE languages, Art GCSE, Music, Geography and History. This makes it possible to obtain an English Baccalaureate.

Other BTECs and GCSEs are offered subject to demand and staffing: Business GCSE, Computer Science GCSE, Design and Technology (Product Design or Textiles) GCSE, Drama GCSE, Philosophy and Ethics GCSE, Film Studies GCSE, Health and Social Care BTEC Tech Award Level 1, BTEC Level 1/Level 2 Tech Award in Digital Information, Catering Level 1/Level 2 Award and BTEC Level 1/Level 2 First Award in Sport.

== Notable former pupils ==
- Roger Bush, Anglican priest
- Matt Gill, former Norwich City footballer
- Ryan Jarvis, footballer
- Rossi Jarvis, footballer
- Adam Tann played professionally for Cambridge United and Leyton Orient
- Sam Riviere, award-winning poet
