= Arnold Wood =

The Venerable Arnold Wood, M.A. (24 October 1918 – 27 April 2007) was Archdeacon of Cornwall from 1981 to 1988.

Wood was educated at Trinity Academy, Halifax and was a Commissioned Officer in the RASC from 1939 to 1949. He worked in engineering at CMI from 1949 to 1963. He studied for ordination at Trinity College, Bristol; and was ordained in 1966. After a curacy at Kirkheaton he held incumbencies at Mount Pellon, Lanreath, and Pelynt. He was Rural Dean of West Wivelshire from 1976 to 1981; and a member of the General Synod of the Church of England from 1985 to 1988. He was also a General Commissioner of Income Tax from 1977 to 1993.

== Notes ==
Church of England titles
Preceded by Peter Young	Archdeacon of Cornwall; 1981–1988	Succeeded by Raymond Ravenscroft
