= Sam Toy =

British industrialist

OBE Sam Toy
- Born: 21 August 1923; Mabe, Cornwall, England
- Died: 24 March 2008 (aged 84)
- Occupation: Industrialist

Sam Toy OBE (21 August 1923 – 24 March 2008) was a British industrialist who was chair of Ford Motor Company UK from 1980 until 1986. He presided over Ford at a time it faced competition from British Leyland, and saw Ford make their last Cortina. Toy also led Ford UK through the difficult introduction of the Sierra in 1982, the MK3 Granada and the Orion.

After schooling at Falmouth Grammar School, he went to Selwyn College, Cambridge, on an RAF scholarship to do a one-year short course in Engineering. He then served for the rest of the War. On demobilisation he returned to Cambridge, transferring to Fitzwilliam College, and completed his degree through studying Geography. After his retirement, he lived in Hampshire.
