= Stamford Raffles-Flint =

Stamford Raffles-Flint (6 February 1847 – 15 August 1925) was Archdeacon of Cornwall from 1916 until his death.

He was the son of William Charles Raffles Flint and his wife Jenny Rosdew Mudge, daughter of Richard Zachariah Mudge, educated at Eton and University College, Oxford and ordained in 1871. After a curacy at Alverstoke he was Rector of Ladock from 1885 until 1920 when he became Canon Residentiary and Treasurer of Truro Cathedral. In 1884 he married Ethel Maud Quentin, sister of George Quentin.

Church of England titles
Preceded by John Rundle Cornish	Archdeacon of Cornwall; 1916–1925	Succeeded by Guy Hockley
