= Joseph Hall (bishop) =

British bishop and writer (1574–1656)

- Bishop of Norwich
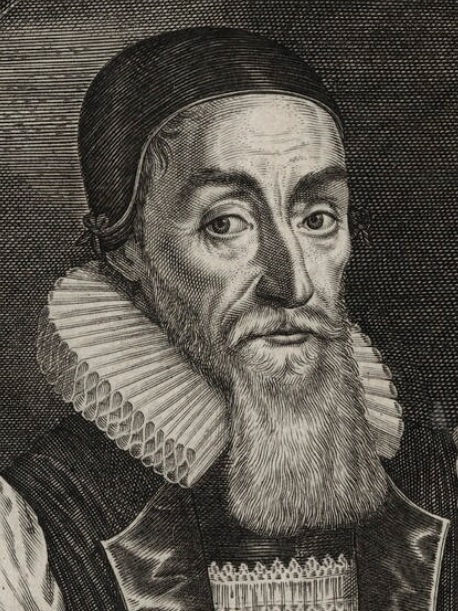
- Detail of an engraving by John Payne (1628)
- Diocese: Diocese of Norwich
- Appointed: 1641
- Term ended: 1646
- Predecessor: Richard Montagu
- Successor: Episcopacy abolished
- Previous post: Bishop of Exeter (1627–1641)

Personal details
- Born: 1 July 1574 Prestop Park, Leicestershire, England
- Died: 8 September 1656 (aged 82) Heigham, near Norwich
- Buried: Norwich Cathedral
- Spouse: Elizabeth Bambridge
- Children: Six
- Education: Emmanuel College, Cambridge

Joseph Hall (1 July 1574 – 8 September 1656) was an English bishop, satirist and moralist. His contemporaries knew him as a devotional writer, and a high-profile controversialist of the early 1640s. In church politics, he tended in fact to a middle way.

Thomas Fuller wrote:

He was commonly called our English Seneca, for the purenesse, plainnesse, and fulnesse of his style. Not unhappy at Controversies, more happy at Comments, very good in his Characters, better in his Sermons, best of all in his Meditations.

Hall's relationship to the stoicism of the classical age, exemplified by Seneca the Younger, is still debated, with the importance of neo-stoicism and the influence of the Flemish philosopher Justus Lipsius to his work being contested, in contrast to Christian morality.

== Early life ==
Joseph Hall was born at Bristow Park, Ashby-de-la-Zouch, on 1 July 1574. His father John Hall was employed under Henry Hastings, 3rd Earl of Huntingdon, president of the north, and was his deputy at Ashby. His mother was Winifred Bambridge, a strict puritan (Perry 1890, p. 75), (Note: Hall has left among his works two tracts ("Observations of some Specialties of Divine Providence in the Life of Joseph Hall, Bishop of Norwich", and "Hard Measure"), which together form a useful and interesting autobiography (Perry 1890, p. 75).) whom her son compared to St. Monica.

Hall attended Ashby Grammar School. When he was 15, Mr. Pelset, lecturer at Leicester, a divine of puritan views, offered to take him "under indentures" and educate him for the ministry. Just before this arrangement was completed, it came to the knowledge of Nathaniel Gilby, son of Anthony Gilby and a fellow of Emmanuel College, Cambridge, who was a friend of the family. Gilby induced Hall's father to send his son to Emmanuel College in 1589. The expense of his education at the university was partly borne by his uncle, Edmund Sleigh. He was elected scholar and afterwards fellow of Emmanuel College (1595), graduating B.A. in 1592 and M.A. in 1596 (B.D. 1603 and D.D. 1612).(Perry 1890, p. 75) Fuller, nearly a contemporary, says that Hall "passed all his degrees with great applause".(Perry 1890, p. 75) He obtained a high reputation in the university for scholarship, and read the public rhetoric lecture in the schools for two years with much credit.

== Priesthood ==
Having taken holy orders, Hall was offered the mastership of Blundell's School, Tiverton, but he refused it in favour of the living of Hawstead, Suffolk, to which he was presented (1601) by Sir Robert Drury. The appointment was not wholly satisfactory: in his parish Hall had an opponent in a Mr Lilly, whom he describes as a "witty and bold atheist", he had to find money to make his house habitable, and he felt that his patron Sir Robert underpaid him. Nevertheless, in 1603, he married Elizabeth Wynniff of Brettenham, Suffolk (see "Family" below).

In 1605, Hall travelled abroad for the first time when he accompanied Sir Edmund Bacon on an embassy to Spa, with the special aim, he says, of acquainting himself with the state and practice of the Roman Catholic Church. At Brussels, he disputed at the Jesuit college on the authenticity of modern miracles, until his patron at length asked him to stop.

Hall's devotional writings had attracted the notice of Henry, Prince of Wales, who made him one of his chaplains (1608). Hall preached officially on the tenth anniversary of King James's accession in 1613, with an assessment in An Holy Panegyrick of the Church of England flattering to the king.

In 1612, Edward Denny gave Hall the curacy of Waltham Holy Cross, Essex, and, in the same year, he received the degree of D.D. Later he received the prebend of Willenhall in St Peter's, the collegiate church of Wolverhampton, and, in 1616, he accompanied James Hay, Lord Doncaster to France, where he was sent to congratulate Louis XIII on his marriage, but Hall was compelled by illness to return. In his absence, the king nominated him Dean of Worcester, and, in 1617, he accompanied James to Scotland, where he defended the Five Articles of Perth, five points of ceremonial which the king desired to impose upon the Scots.

In the next year Hall was chosen as one of the English deputies at the Synod of Dort. However he fell ill, and was replaced by Thomas Goad. At the time (1621–1622) when Marco Antonio de Dominis announced his intention to return to Rome, after a stay in England, Hall wrote to try to dissuade him, without success. In a long-unpublished reply (printed 1666) De Dominis justified himself in a comprehensive statement of his mission against schism and its limited results, hampered by Dort and a lack of freedom under James I.

== Career at Exeter and Norwich ==
In a sermon Columba Noæ of February 1624 (1623 Old Style) to Convocation, Hall gave a list or personal panorama of leading theologians of the Church of England. In the same year he also refused the see of Gloucester: at the time English delegates to Dort were receiving preferment, since King James approved of the outcome. Hall was then involved as a mediator, taking an active part in the Arminian and Calvinist controversy in the English church, and trying to get other clergy to accept Dort. In 1627, he became Bishop of Exeter.

In spite of his Calvinistic opinions, Hall maintained that to acknowledge the errors which had arisen in the Catholic Church did not necessarily imply disbelief in her catholicity, and that the Church of England having repudiated these errors should not deny the claims of the Roman Catholic Church on that account. This view commended itself to Charles I and his episcopal advisers; even if Hall, with John Davenant and Thomas Morton, was considered a likely die-hard by Richard Montagu if it ever came to reunification with the Catholic Church. At the same time, Archbishop Laud sent spies into Hall's diocese to report on the Calvinistic tendencies of the bishop and his lenience to the Puritan and low church clergy. Hall gradually took up an anti-Laudian, but also anti-Presbyterian position, while remaining a Protestant eirenicist in co-operation with John Dury and concerned with continental Europe.

In 1641 Hall was translated to the See of Norwich, and in the same year sat on the Lords' Committee on religion. On 30 December, he was, with other bishops, brought before the bar of the House of Lords to answer a charge of high treason of which the Commons had voted them guilty. They were finally convicted of an offence against the Statute of Praemunire, and condemned to forfeit their estates, receiving a small maintenance from the parliament. They were immured in the Tower of London from New Year to Whitsuntide, when they were released on finding bail.

== Retirement ==
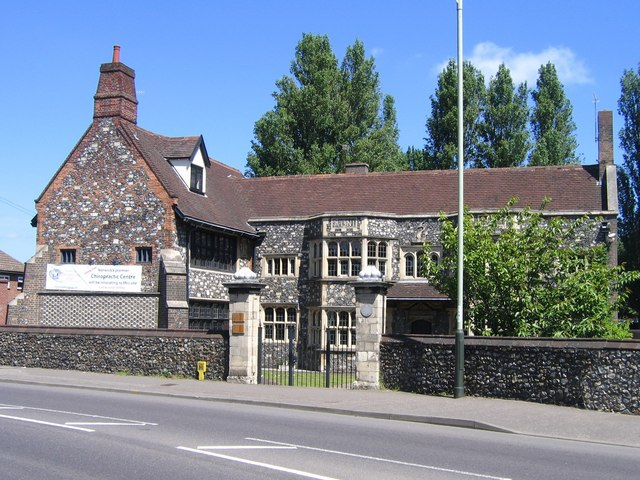
The Dolphin Inn, Norwich, in the building where Hall had his palace from 1643 to 1647

On his release, Hall proceeded to his new diocese at Norwich, the revenues of which he seems for a time to have received, but in 1643, when the property of the "malignants" was sequestrated, Hall was mentioned by name. He was deprived of his See by Parliament on 9 October 1646, as episcopacy was abolished for the duration of the Commonwealth and the Protectorate. Mrs Hall had difficulty in securing a fifth of the maintenance (£400) assigned to the bishop by the parliament; they were eventually ejected from the palace, and the cathedral was dismantled. Hall describes its desecration in Hard Measure:

Lord, what work was here! what clattering of glasses and beating down of walls! what tearing up of monuments! what pulling down of seats! what wrestling down of irons and brass from the windows and walls...

Hall described the triumphal procession of the Puritan iconoclasts as they carried vestments, service books and singing books to be burned in the nearby market place, while soldiers lounged in the despoiled cathedral drinking and smoking their pipes.

Hall retired to the hamlet of Heigham, now a suburb of Norwich, where he spent his last thirteen years preaching and writing until "he was first forbidden by man, and at last disabled by God". In 1655 Gibson Lucas, the former presbyterian Commissioner and Justice of the Peace in Suffolk, regretted his previous rejection of episcopal polity. He was one of 63 priests Hall ordained in contravention of the 9 October 1646 Ordinance for the abolishing of Archbishops and Bishops. However Hall regarded Lucas as a "notable precedent for the rest of our learned, & religious Gentry to follow".

He bore his many troubles and the additional burden of much bodily suffering with sweetness and patience, dying on 8 September 1656. In his old age, Hall was attended upon by the doctor Thomas Browne, who wrote of him:

A person of singular humility, patience and piety: his own works are the best monument, and character of himself, which was also very lively drawn in his excellent funeral sermon preached by my learned and faithful friend Mr. John Whitefoot, Rector of Heigham.

Hall was buried at St Bartholomew, Heigham, but the church was bombed in 1942, and in 1975 his remains were moved to the cathedral cloisters. The location of the re-burial was then 'forgotten' only to be re-discovered in 2012 by David Berwick using photographs of the ceremony taken for the Eastern Daily Press.

== Works ==
Hall contributed to several distinct literary areas: satirical verse as a young man; polemical writing, particularly in defending episcopacy; and devotional writings, including contemplations carrying a political slant. He was influenced by Lipsian neostoicism. The anonymous Mundus alter et idem is a satirical utopian fantasy, not denied by him in strong terms at any point.

=== Satire and poetry ===
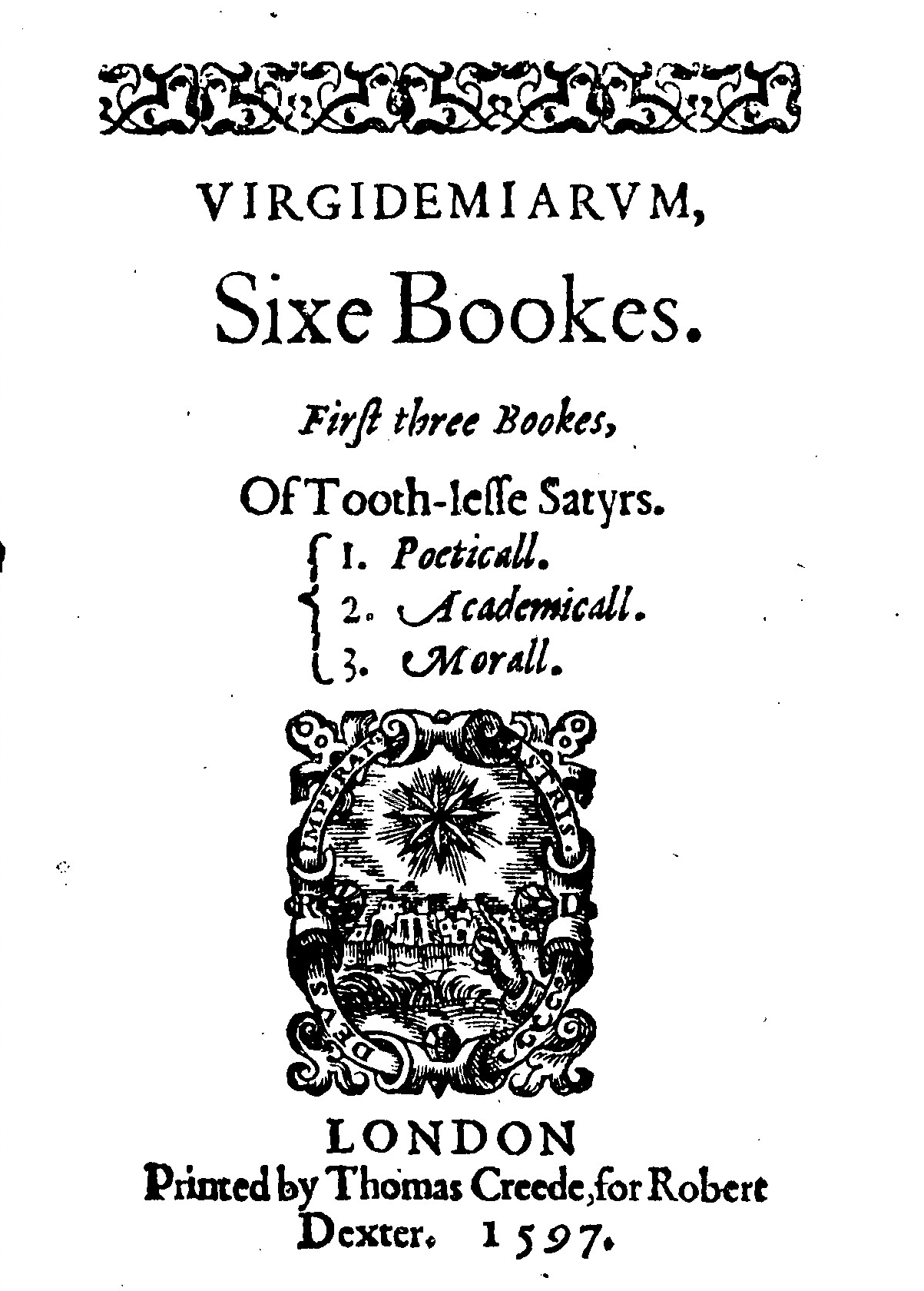
Title page of Joseph Hall's Virgidemiarum, 1597.

During his residence at Cambridge, Hall wrote his Virgidemiarum (1597), (Note: "Virgidemiarum. Sixe Bookes. First three Bookes. Of Toothlesse Satyrs. (1) Poeticall, (2) Academicall, (3) Morall" (London: Thomas Creede, 1597), 12mo.) satires in English written after Latin models. The claim he put forward in the prologue to be the earliest English satirist:

I first adventure, follow me who list
And be the second English satirist.

offended John Marston, who attacked him in satires published in 1598. In the declining years of the reign of Elizabeth I there was much satirical literature, and it was felt to be an attack on established institutions. John Whitgift, the archbishop of Canterbury, ordered that Hall's satires, along with works of Thomas Nashe, John Marston, Christopher Marlowe, Sir John Davies and others should be burnt, on the ground of licentiousness; but shortly afterwards Hall's book was ordered to be "staied at the press," which may be interpreted as reprieved.

Virgidemiarum was followed by an amended edition in 1598, and in the same year by Virgidemiarum. The three last bookes. Of byting Satyres (reprinted 1599). Not in fact the earliest English satirist, Hall wrote in smooth heroic couplets. In the first book of his satires (Poeticall), he attacks the writers whose verses were devoted to licentious subjects, the bombast of Tamburlaine and tragedies built on similar lines, the laments of the ghosts of the Mirror for Magistrates, the metrical eccentricities of Gabriel Harvey and Richard Stanyhurst, the extravagances of the sonneteers, and the sacred poets (Southwell is aimed at in "Now good St Peter weeps pure Helicon, And both the Mary's make a music moan"). In Book II Satire 6 occurs a description of the trencher-chaplain, who is tutor and hanger-on in a country manor. Among his other satirical portraits is that of the famished gallant, the guest of "Duke Humfray." Book VI consists of one long satire on vices and follies dealt with in the earlier books.

Hall's earliest published verse appeared in a collection of elegies on the death of William Whitaker, to which he contributed the only English poem (1596). A line in Marston's Pigmalion's Image (1598) indicates that Hall wrote pastoral poems, but none of these have survived, although his poem 'A Defiance to Envy' has some pastoral elements. He also wrote:

- The King's Prophecie; or Weeping Joy (1603), a gratulatory poem on the accession of James I
- Epistles, both the first and second volumes of which appeared in 1608 and a third in 1611
- Characters of Virtues and Vices (1608), versified by Nahum Tate (1691)
- Solomon's Divine Arts (1609)

Hall gave up verse satires and lighter forms of literature when he was ordained a minister in the Church of England.

=== Mundus alter et idem ===
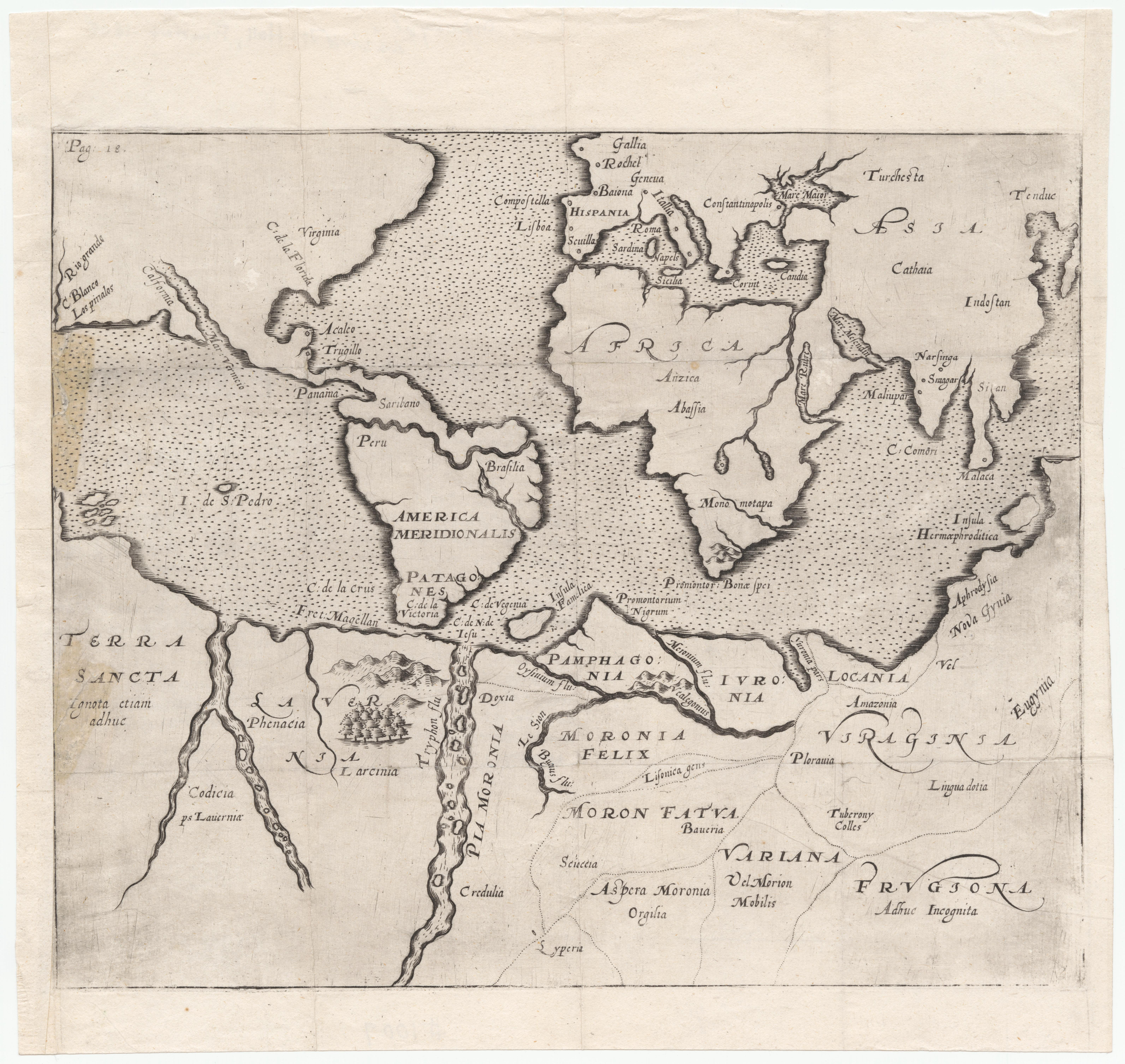
Map from Mundus alter et idem.

Hall is credited with writing the dystopian novel Mundus alter et idem sive Terra Australis antehac semper incognita; Longis itineribus peregrini Academici nuperrime illustrata (1605? and 1607), a satirical description of London, with some criticism of the Roman Catholic Church.

=== Controversy ===
Hall's initial work of religious controversy was against Protestant separatists. In 1608 he had written a letter of remonstrance to John Robinson and John Smyth. Robinson, who had been a beneficed clergyman near Yarmouth, had replied in An Answer to a Censorious Epistle; and Hall published (1610) A Common Apology against the Brownists, a lengthy treatise answering Robinson paragraph by paragraph. It set a style, tight but rich using animadversion, for Hall's theological writings. Hall criticised Robinson, the future pastor of the Mayflower congregation, alongside Richard Bernard and John Murton.

In Hall's Via media, The Way of Peace (1619), he did his best to persuade the two parties (Calvinist and Arminian) to accept a compromise. His later defence of the English Church, and episcopacy as Biblical, entitled Episcopacy by Divine Right (1640), was twice revised at Laud's dictation.

This was followed by An Humble Remonstrance to the High Court of Parliament (1640 and 1641), an eloquent and forceful defence of Hall's order, which produced a retort from the syndicate of Puritan divines, who wrote under the name of Smectymnuus. This was followed by a long controversy to which John Milton contributed five pamphlets, virulently attacking Hall and his early satires.

Other controversial writings by Hall include:

- The Olde Religion: A treatise, wherein is laid downe the true state of the difference betwixt the Reformed and the Romane Church; and the blame of this schisme is cast upon the true Authors (1628)
- Columba Noae olivam adferens, a sermon preached at St Paul's in 1623
- A Short Answer to the Vindication of Smectymnuus (1641)
- A Modest Confutation of (Milton's) Animadversions (1642).

=== Devotional ===
Hall's devotional works include:

- Holy Observations Lib. I (1607)
- Some few of David's Psalmes Metaphrased (1609)
- Three Centuries of Meditations and Vowes, Divine and Morall (1606, 1607, 1609), edited by Charles Sayle
- The Arte of Divine Meditation (1607)
- Contemplations on the Historical Passages of the Old and New Testaments (1614)
- Heaven upon Earth, or of True Peace and Tranquillitie of Mind (1606), reprinted with some of his letters in John Wesley's Christian Library, vol. iv. (1819)
- Occasional Meditations (1630), edited by his son Robert Hall
- Henochisme; or a Treatise showing how to walk with God (1639), translated from Bishop Hall's Latin by Moses Wall
- The Devout Soul; or Rules of Heavenly Devotion (1644), often since reprinted
- The Balm of Gilead (1646, 1752)
- Christ Mysticall; or the blessed union of Christ and his Members (1647), of which General Gordon was a student (reprinted from Gordon's copy, 1893)
- Susurrium cum Deo (1659)
- The Great Mysterie of Godliness (1650)
- Resolutions and Decisions of Divers Practicall cases of Conscience (1649, 1650, 1654).

=== Autobiographical ===
Hall's autobiographical tracts are Observations of some Specialities of Divine Providence in the Life of Joseph Hall, Bishop of Norwich, Written with his own hand, and his Hard Measure, reprinted in Christopher Wordsworth's Ecclesiastical Biography.

=== Editions ===
In 1615 Hall published A Recollection of such treatises as have been published (1615, 1617, 1621); in 1625 appeared his Works (reprinted 1627, 1628, 1634, 1662).

The first complete Works appeared in 1808, edited by Josiah Pratt. Other editions are by Peter Hall (1837) and by Philip Wynter (1863). See also Bishop Hall, his Life and Times (1826), by Rev. John Jones; Life of Joseph Hall, by Rev. George Lewis (1886); Alexander Balloch Grosart, The Complete Poems of Joseph Hall with introductions, etc. (1879); Satires, etc. (Early English Poets, ed. Samuel Weller Singer, 1824). Many of Hall's works were translated into French, and some into Dutch, and there have been numerous selections from his devotional works.

== Family ==
In 1603, Hall married Elizabeth (died 27 August 1652), daughter of George Winiffe of Brettenham, Suffolk. They had six sons and two daughters. The eldest son, Robert, D.D. (1605–1667), became Canon of Exeter in 1629, and Archdeacon of Cornwall in 1633. Joseph, the second son (1607–1669), was registrar of Exeter Cathedral. George, the third son (1612–1668), became bishop of Chester. Samuel, the fourth son (1616–1674), was sub-dean of Exeter. It is claimed that his son Richard Hall (1635–1688), emigrated to America in 1670, and patented a large tract of land on each side of the Susquehanna River, about a mile above the mouth of the Ocheraro, just within the limits of Maryland.

== Arms ==
Coat of arms of Joseph Hall
Escutcheon Sable, three talbots' heads erased argent, langued gules.

== Authorities ==
In 1826 John Jones published Bishop Hall, His Life and Times. A recent biography of Joseph Hall is Bishop Joseph Hall: 1574–1656: A biographical and critical study by Frank Livingstone Huntley, D.S.Brewer Ltd, Cambridge, 1979.

Criticism of his satires is to be found in Thomas Warton's History of English Poetry, vol. iv. pp. 363–409 (ed. Hazlitt, 1871), where a comparison is instituted between Marston and Hall.

== Sources ==
- Bremer, Francis J.; Webster, Tom (2006). "Hall, Joseph (1574-1656)". Puritans and Puritanism in Europe and America: A Comprehensive Encyclopedia. p. 117.
- Bryant, Barry E. (2000). Mattei, Michael (ed.). "Molina, Arminois, Plaifere, Goad, and Wesley on human free-will, divine omniscience, and middle knowledge". Wesley Center for Applied Theology at Northwest Nazarene University. Archived from the original on 12 May 2008.
- Chew, Audrey (December 1950). "Joseph Hall and Neo-Stoicism". PMLA. 65 (6): 1130–1145.
- Chisholm, Hugh, ed. (1911). "Hall, Joseph" . Encyclopædia Britannica. Vol. 12 (11th ed.). Cambridge University Press.
- "Hall, Joseph (HL588J)". A Cambridge Alumni Database. University of Cambridge.
- "Gilbey, Nathaniel (GLBY582N)". A Cambridge Alumni Database. University of Cambridge.
- Milton, Anthony (2002). Catholic and Reformed: The Roman and Protestant Churches in English Protestant Thought, 1600–1640. p. 398.
- Norwich, Joseph Hall, Bishop of (1808). The works of ... Joseph Hall, with some account of his life and sufferings, written by himself, arranged and revised by J. Pratt. p. 145.
- Papy, Jan (23 August 2004). "Justus Lipsius". Stanford Encyclopedia of Philosophy.
- Parry, Graham (1981). The Golden Age Restor'd. St. Martin's Press. pp. 232–235. ISBN 9780312331948.
- Patterson, W.B. (1997). King James VI and I and the Reunion of Christendom. pp. 252–253.
- Perry, George Gresley (1890). "Hall, Joseph". Dictionary of National Biography. London: Smith, Elder & Co.
- Salzman, Paul (2002). "Narrative Contexts for Bacon's New Atlantis". In Price, Bronwen (ed.). Francis Bacon's New Atlantis: New interdisciplinary essays. p. 39.
- Sharpe, Kevin (1992). The Personal Rule of Charles I. Yale University Press. p. 307. ISBN 9780300056884.
- Trevor-Roper, Hugh (1967). Religion, the Reformation and Social Change. p. 256.
- Trevor-Roper, Hugh (2000). Archbishop Laud. Phoenix Press. pp. 264, 266. ISBN 9781842122020.

Church of England titles
Preceded by Valentine Carey	Bishop of Exeter; 1627–1641	Succeeded by Ralph Brownrigg
Preceded by Richard Montagu	Bishop of Norwich; 1641–1646	Succeeded by English Commonwealth (episcopacy abolished), then Edward Reynolds
