= Falmouth Grammar School =

Defunct grammar school in Falmouth, Cornwall

Coordinates: 50°9′13″N 5°5′3″W

Falmouth Grammar School was a grammar school in Falmouth, Cornwall, United Kingdom, from 1824 to 1971.

== History ==
The school was first established in 1824 or 1825, originally as the Classical and Mathematical School. The buildings date from 1868. The school was closed in 1971, and part of the building was used by Falmouth School. The building is listed and is used for Adult Education.

There is a painting from 1951 by Wallace Martin, Falmouth Grammar School Swimming Sports at Sunny Cove, near Swanpool, Falmouth.

== Notable students and staff ==
=== Students ===
- John Sydney Hicks, physician and surgeon
- Roger Hosen, rugby union player and cricketer
- Paul Martin, antiques dealer and television presenter
- Trevor McCabe, former Archdeacon of Cornwall
- Victor Roberts (rugby player) played as a wing forward for England rugby XV and Cornwall XV
- Harold Tarraway, middle-distance runner, competed in the men's 800 metres at the 1948 Summer Olympics
- Sam Toy, industrialist
- Richard M. Trevethan, First World War flying ace

=== Staff ===
- Norman Pounds, geographer and historian
