= John Rixman =

English priest

John Rixman was a 16th century English priest.

Rixman was educated at Oriel College, Oxford. He was Principal of St Mary Hall, Oxford from 1532 to 1537. held livings at St Petroc, Trevalga, St Clement Danes, London; St Mary's Church, Berry Pomeroy and St Mary, Churston Ferrers. He was Archdeacon of Cornwall from 1554 until 1557.
