= William Webbe (mayor) =

16th-century English merchant and Lord Mayor of London

William Webbe (died 1599) was a 16th-century English merchant and Lord Mayor of London. He was the son of John Webbe, a clothier of Reading in Berkshire. Webbe moved to London and joined the Salters' Company, one of the livery companies of the city. He was elected alderman in 1581, then as one of the Sheriffs of London later the same year. He was elected mayor in 1591, succeeding Rowland Heyward. While serving as mayor, he was the subject of a dedication of one of the works of the author Richard Johnson, his "Nine Worthies of London." After his term, he served as the president of the Bridewell and Bethlehem Hospitals, from 1594 until his death. He died in 1599.

Webbe was related by blood or marriage to several other important figures of the time. He was the maternal uncle of William Laud, the Archbishop of Canterbury. Webbe married Bennet (or Benedicta) Draper, daughter of an earlier Lord Mayor of London, Sir Christopher Draper. Two of his sisters-in-law married other Lord Mayors of London, respectively, Sir Wolstan Dixie and Sir Henry Billingsley.

Civic offices
Preceded by Rowland Hayward	Lord Mayor of London; 1591–1592	Succeeded by William Rowe
