= Trevor McCabe =

Anglican clergy (1933–2022)

The Ven. John Trevor McCabe (26 January 1933 – 23 December 2022) was Archdeacon of Cornwall from 1996 to 1999.

== Biography ==
McCabe was born on 26 January 1933. He was educated at Falmouth Grammar School; the University of Nottingham; St Catherine's College, Oxford; and Wycliffe Hall, Oxford. He was ordained in 1959. After curacies in Compton Gifford and Exeter he held incumbencies in Capel, Surrey and the Scilly Isles. He was also a Chaplain in the RNR from 1963 to 1983 and a Canon Residentiary at Bristol Cathedral from 1981 to 1983. After that he was at Manaccan with Helston until his appointment as Archdeacon. McCabe died on 23 December 2022, at the age of 89.

Church of England titles
Preceded by Raymond Ravenscroft	Archdeacon of Cornwall; 1996–1999	Succeeded by Rodney Whiteman
