= Gibson Lucas =

English puritan theologian

Gibson Lucas (15 March 1615 – 26 May 1698) was an English puritan theologian active politically during the English Revolution.

Lucas was born in Horringer, the son of William Lucas and his wife, Christian, daughter of Thomas Gibson, and alderman of Norwich. After attending Bury Grammar School, he continued his education at Caius College, Cambridge. He was a parliamentarian during the English Civil War. He participated in the Bury Conference (1645). He was later listed as one of the Committeeman for the 11th Division of Suffolk, drawn up by the presbyterian principals of the Westminster Assembly.

Lucas was a prominent Justice of the Peace in Suffolk. Joseph Hall, whose role as Bishop of Norwich had been abolished by the 9 October 1646 Ordinance for the abolishing of Archbishops and Bishops was approached by Lucas who regretted his previous rejection of episcopal polity. Lucas was one of 63 priests Hall ordained in contravention of this Ordnance. However Hall stated that he regarded Lucas as providing "a notable precedent for the rest of our learned, & religious Gentry to follow".
