= William Rowe (Lord Mayor of London) =

English merchant and politician

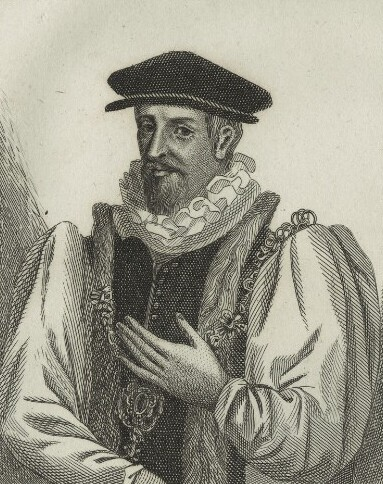
1796 engraving of Rowe

Sir William Rowe was an English merchant and politician who served as the Sheriff of London in 1583 and Lord Mayor of London in 1592. He was Master of the Worshipful Company of Ironmongers and was knighted (between 24 April and 23 May) 1593. He died on 23 October 1593. Sir William's cousin Sir Thomas Rowe was also Lord Mayor of London, in 1568, as was Sir Thomas's son Henry Rowe in 1607.

== Marriage and issue ==
William Rowe was married to Jane Lucar (daughter of Emanuel Lucar, Merchant Taylor of London, by his first wife Elizabeth, daughter of Paul Withypoll).

- Nicholas Rowe of Muswell Hill, Middlesex (born c. 1568, died 17 August 1616) married Elizabeth Rivers, daughter of Sir George Rivers of Chafford.
- William Rowe (born c. 1573, died 1634) married Cicely Rowe, daughter of William Rowe of Higham Hill, Walthamstow.
- Julia(n) Rowe married Francis Babington.
- Suzan Rowe who apparently married (1) to Richard Welby (baptized 1563, died 1634); (2) to Julian Muffett (Moffytt); widow of James Haes (James Huyshe) of London).

Civic offices
Preceded by William Webbe	Lord Mayor of London; 1592–1593	Succeeded by Cuthbert Buckell
