= Guy Hockley =

Guy Wittenoom Hockley (16 February 1869 - 16 September 1946) was Archdeacon of Cornwall from 1925 until his death.

He was born in Malden, Surrey, to Julius Joseph Hockley and Emma Annie Mary Darby. He was educated at Balliol College, Oxford and ordained in 1893. After curacies at Hawarden and Westminster he was Domestic Chaplain to the Bishop of Worcester from 1903 until 1905; and the Bishop of Birmingham from 1905 until 1906. He was Vicar of St Saviour, Hoxton from 1906 until 1908 and then of St Matthew's, Westminster from 1908 until 1914. He was Rector of Heathfield, Somerset from 1914 to 1916. He was Rural Dean of North Liverpool from 1916 to 1925.

He died in Truro unmarried, aged 77.

Church of England titles
Preceded by Stamford Raffles-Flint	Archdeacon of Cornwall; 1925–1946	Succeeded by John Holden
