= Raymond Ravenscroft =

Archdeacon of Cornwall (1931–2020)

The Venerable Raymond Lockwood Ravenscroft (15 September 1931 - 18 May 2020) was an Anglican priest who was Archdeacon of Cornwall from 1988 to 1996.

Ravenscroft was educated at Sea Point Boys' High School, the University of Leeds and the College of the Resurrection, Mirfield. He was ordained deacon in 1955 and priest in 1956. After curacies at St Alban, Goodwood, Cape Town in South Africa (1955–57) and St John's Cathedral, Bulawayo in what was then Southern Rhodesia (1957–59) he was Rector of Francistown in what was then Bechuanaland (1959–62). He then returned to England and served at St Ives, Cornwall (1962–64); All Saints' Church, Falmouth, Cornwall (1964–68), Launceston, Cornwall (1968-74) and Grampound (1974–88).

He married Ann Stockwell; she predeceased him, in 2008. He died in 2020, aged 88.

== Notes ==
Church of England titles
Preceded by Arnold Wood	Archdeacon of Cornwall; 1988-1996	Succeeded by Trevor McCabe
