= Norman Pounds =

English geographer and historian

- Born: 23 February 1912; Bath, England
- Died: 24 March 2006 (aged 94)

Academic background
- Education: Fitzwilliam College, Cambridge; University of London

Academic work
- Discipline: Geography and history
- Institutions: University of Cambridge; Indiana University

Norman John Greville Pounds (23 February 1912 – 24 March 2006) was an English geographer and historian. He wrote over 30 books, primarily on the history and geography of Europe from several different time periods.

== Early life and career ==
Pounds grew up in Bath, England, where he was born on 23 February 1912. He went to three schools in the area. The first two were Church of England schools which began his opposition to organised religion. He attended King Edward's School on a scholarship between 1923 and 1931. He then studied at Fitzwilliam House at University of Cambridge where he received a diploma in education.

He became a geography and history teacher at Falmouth Grammar School in Cornwall between 1935 and 1944. When the Second World War broke out in 1939, he was declared medically unfit for active service and instead worked as a firewatcher. He also spent this time writing his PhD on the historical geography of Cornwall and received a first-class geography and history BA degree from the University of London. Pounds began teaching geography at The University of Cambridge in 1945 before moving onto Indiana University in the 1950s where he was a geography professor until 1968. He continued to teach at various institutions for several decades, finally stopping in 2004 at the age of 92.

== Personal life ==
Pounds' father, John Greville Pounds (1883–1935), was a compositor and his mother, Camilla Martha Minnie née Fisher (1884–1963) was a teacher. He married Dorothy Josephine Mitchell (1910–1989) in 1938. He died on 24 March 2006 of Leukaemia which he was diagnosed with at age 87.
