= George Allanson =

George Allanson was Archdeacon of Cornwall from 14 September 1737 until his death in 1741 .

Allanson was born in the City of London, educated at Christ Church, Oxford and admitted to the Middle Temple in 1713. He held livings at St Tudy and St Gluvias; and was made a prebendary of Exeter Cathedral in 1730.
