= William Parker (priest, died c. 1631) =

William Parker (died c. 1631) was an Anglican priest. and archdeacon of Cornwall.

Parker was educated at Lincoln College, Oxford. He was Archdeacon of Totnes; from 1613 to 1616: and Archdeacon of Cornwall from 1616 until 1628.
