= Frederick Boreham =

British clergyman (1888–1966)

- Archdeacon of Cornwall
- Church: Church of England
- Diocese: Truro
- Installed: 1949
- Term ended: 1965
- Predecessor: John Holden
- Successor: Peter Young
- Other post: Archdeacon of Western Szechwan (1928–1935)

Personal details
- Born: 7 June 1888 Tunbridge Wells, Kent, England
- Died: 1 February 1966 (aged 77) Falmouth, Cornwall
- Denomination: Anglican
- Spouse: Caroline Mildred Slater
- Children: John Boreham
- Education: St Aidan's College, Birkenhead; St John's Hall, Durham

Frederick Boreham (7 June 1888 – 1 February 1966) was Archdeacon of Cornwall and Chaplain to Her Majesty Queen Elizabeth II.

== Career ==
Boreham was born in Tunbridge Wells, Kent, and educated at St Aidan's College, Birkenhead and St John's Hall, Durham. He served as a missionary in Mianyang (formerly spelt Mien Yong), Sichuan (formerly Szechwan), west China under the Church Missionary Society from 1917 to 1924 and again from 1928 to 1934, and married a fellow missionary Caroline Mildred Slater in 1918. He succeeded Lewis Frederick Havermale as editor of The West China Missionary News in 1931, a position he held until 1934. He was listed in the 1933–1934 directory of the West China Union University as a teacher of History. He was vicar of Holy Trinity Hull from 1937 to 1947. He also served as Archdeacon of Western Szechwan prior to his appointment as Archdeacon of Cornwall. He became a chaplain to Queen Elizabeth II on the occasion of her coronation on 5 August 1952, and remained in that post until his death in 1966. There is a memorial to him at Truro Cathedral.

== Personal life ==
Boreham married Caroline Mildred Slater and had four children, three of whom survived into adulthood: Peter, Cicely and John.

== See also ==
- Anglicanism in Mianyang
- Anglicanism in Sichuan
- Diocese of Truro
- Vyvyan Donnithorne
- Gospel Church, Mianyang

== Notes ==
Church of England titles
Preceded by John Holden	Archdeacon of Cornwall; 1949-1965	Succeeded by Peter Young
