= Archdeacon of Cornwall =

Senior cleric in the Church of England

The Archdeacon of Cornwall is a senior cleric in the Church of England Diocese of Truro and one of two archdeacons in the diocese.

== History and composition ==
The archdeaconry of Cornwall was created in the Diocese of Exeter in the late 11th century. The area and the archdeacon remained part of that diocese until 15 December 1876 when the Diocese of Truro was established. The archdeaconry was then divided on 21 May 1878 to create the new Archdeaconry of Bodmin.

Today, the archdeaconry of Cornwall consists of the deaneries of Carnmarth North, Carnmarth South, Kerrier, Penwith, Powder, Pydar and St Austell (Powder deanery includes the Isles of Scilly).

== List of archdeacons ==
=== High Medieval ===
- ?–1086–?: Roland
- ?–13 June 1098 (d.): Alnothus
- bef. 1110–aft. 1110: Ernaldus
- bef. c. 1135–aft. c. 1135: Hugo de Auco
- bef. c. 1143–aft. c. 1143: William
- bef. c. 1150–aft. c. 1150: A.
- aft. c. 1150–30 April 1157 (d.): Walter
- aft. 1161–bef. 1171: Ralph Luce
- ?–7 September 1171 (d.): Peter
- bef. c. 1180–aft. c. 1180: Galterus
- bef. 1191–aft. 1186: Walter Fitz Rogo
- bef. c. 1219–aft. c. 1219: Simon (nephew of the bishop, Simon of Apulia)
- bef. 28 May 1228–aft. 1228: Martin
- bef. 1238–aft. 1238: Thomas
- bef. August 1243–aft. August 1243: John Rof
- Jordan
- bef. 1264–1264 (res.): Geofrey de Bismano
- 7 April 1264–bef. 1274: Robert de Tefford
- 23 August 1274 – 28 June 1282 (d.): John de Esse
- 8 July 1282–bef. 1296: Henry (or Thomas) de Bolleghe
- 1295–1307 (d.): William Bodrugan

=== Late Medieval ===
- 7 January 1308 – 30 June 1342 (exch.): Adam de Carleton
- c. 1311: Walter (disputed)
- 8 March 1328: Nicholas de Scotton (mistaken royal grant)
- 30 June 1342 – 24 March 1344 (exch. reversed): Annibale Cardinal di Ceccano (Cardinal-bishop of Frascati)
- 24 March 1344 – 19 June 1346 (exch.): Adam de Carleton (again)
- 19 June 1346 – 1349 (res.): John de St Paul, later Archbishop of Dublin
- 1349–1371: The king and the pope appointed a succession of opposing claimants:
  - Papal grants:
    - 1349–bef. 1355 (res.): John de Harewell
    - 7 February 1355–bef. 1361 (d.): Thomas David
    - 16 August 1361–bef. 1371: Alexander Neville, later Archbishop of York
  - Royal grants:
    - 15 February 1350 – 16 November 1357 (exch.): William Cusance
    - 16 November 1357–bef. 1371: Nicholas de Newton
- 15 October 1371 – 17 March 1377 (exch.): Thomas de Orgrave
- 17 March 1377 – 26 July 1381 (exch.): Robert Braybrooke, later Bishop of London
- 26 July 1381–bef. 1397 (res.): Nicholas Braybrooke
- c. 5 April 1395: Richard Lentwardyn (ineffective exchange)
- 14 July 1397 – 1412 (res.): Edward Dantsey, later Bishop of Meath
- 3 April 1413–bef. 1418 (d.): John Bremore
- 15 September 1418–bef. 1419 (d.): Richard Penels
- 29 May 1419 – 1436 (res.): William Fylham
- 2 October 1436–bef. 1445 (d.): Walter Trengof
- 20 February 1445–bef. 1446 (d.): Richard Helyer
- 19 December 1446–bef. 1449 (res.): Henry Trevilian
- 20 March 1449 – 12 February 1461 (exch.): John Selot
- 12 February 1461–aft. 1463: Thomas Marke
- bef. 1491–1499 (res.): William Sylke
- 15 April 1499 – 1509 (res.): Thomas Harrys
- 16 December 1509 – 1515 (res.): Bernard Oldham
- 18 April–September 1515 (res.): John Fulford
- 28 September 1515–bef 1517 (res.): Hugh Ashton
- 3 February 1517–bef. 1528 (res.): Richard Sampson, later Bishop of Coventry and Lichfield
- 8 September 1528 – 1534 (res.): Rowland Lee, later Bishop of Coventry and Lichfield
- 11 June 1534–September 1537 (d.): Thomas Bedyll
- 8 October 1537–bef. 1543 (res.): Thomas Wynter (also Archdeacon of York until 1540)

=== Early modern ===
- 25 May 1543 – 1545 (res.): John Pollard (also Archdeacon of Wilts until 1544 and Archdeacon of Barnstaple from 1544)
- 17 October 1547–bef. 1553 (res.): Hugh Weston
- 23 September 1554–bef. 1556: John Rixman
- 2 March 1556 – 1563 (d.): George Harvey
- 13 October 1563 – 1563 (deprived): Roger Alley (son of the bishop, William Alley)
- 3 January 1571 – 1603 (d.): Thomas Somaster 2nd son of William Somaster (1507–1589) of Painsford, Ashprington
- 10 June 1574–?: Nicholas Marston (presumably ineffective)
- 5 September 1603–bef. 1616 (res.): William Hutchinson
- 21 July–October 1616 (res.): Jasper Swift
- 8 November 1616–bef. 1629 (res.): William Parker
- 27 January 1629–bef. 1631: Martin Mansogg/Nansogg
- bef. 1631–1631 (d.): William Parker (again)
- 22 July 1631 – 27 July 1633 (d.): Robert Peterson
- 30 July 1633–bef. 1641 (res.): Robert Hall
- 7 October 1641 – 1641: George Hall
- 1641–1660: Vacant during the English Commonwealth
- 1 August 1660–bef. 1672: Edward Cotton
- 3 September 1672 – 17 December 1714 (d.): Edward Drew
- 25 January 1715 – 1717: Lancelot Blackburne (also Dean of Exeter)
- 1717–1732: ?
- 7 February 1732 – 27 July 1737 (d.): Charles Fleetwood
- 14 September 1737–bef. 1741 (d.): George Allanson
- 25 August 1741 – 1 February 1788 (d.): John Sleech
- 15 February 1788 – 12 March 1807 (d.): George Moore
- 8 April 1807 – 1826 (res.): William Short
- 6 February 1826 – 1826 (res.): John Bull
- 11 May 1826 – 17 December 1844 (d.): John Sheepshanks
- 6 January 1845–aft. 1885: William Phillpotts

=== Late modern ===
The archdeaconry was transferred to the new Truro diocese on 15 December 1876.

- 1888–1916 (res.): John Cornish (also Bishop of St Germans from 1905)
- 1916–15 August 1925 (d.): Stamford Raffles-Flint
- 1925–1946 (d.): Guy Hockley
- 1947–14 August 1949 (d.): John Holden, Assistant Bishop
- 1949–1965 (ret.): Frederick Boreham
- 1965–1981 (ret.): Peter Young (afterwards archdeacon emeritus)
- 1981–1988 (ret.): Arnold Wood (afterwards archdeacon emeritus)
- 1988–1996 (ret.): Raymond Ravenscroft
- 1996–1999 (ret.): Trevor McCabe (afterwards archdeacon emeritus)
- 2000–2005 (ret.): Rodney Whiteman (afterwards archdeacon emeritus)
- 1 February 2006 – 22 September 2012 (res.): Roger Bush (afterwards Dean of Truro, 2012)
- 16 December 2012 – 15 May 2018: Bill Stuart-White
- 15 May 2018 – 1 September 2019 (Acting): Audrey Elkington, Archdeacon of Bodmin
- 1 September 2019 – October 2023 (died): Paul Bryer
- 2 June 2024 – present: Clive Hogger

== Sources ==
- Le Neve, John; Hardy, Sir Thomas Duffus (1854). Archdeacons of Cornwall . Fasti ecclesiae Anglicanae. Vol. 1. Oxford: Oxford University Press. pp. 397–401 – via Wikisource.
- Horn, Joyce M. (1964), Fasti Ecclesiae Anglicanae 1300–1541, vol. 9, pp. 15–17
