= Peter Young (priest) =

The Venerable Peter Claude Young, M.A. (21 July 1916 – 22 August 1987) was Archdeacon of Cornwall from 1965 to 1981.

Young was educated at Exeter School; Exeter College, Oxford; and Wycliffe Hall, Oxford. After curacies at Ottery St Mary and Stoke Damerel he was Priest in charge at St Bartholomew, Milehouse from 1944 to 1947. After that he held incumbencies at Highweek then Plymouth. He was a Canon Residentiary at Truro Cathedral from 1965 to 1981.

== Notes ==
Church of England titles
Preceded by Frederick Boreham	Archdeacon of Cornwall; 1965-1981	Succeeded by Arnold Wood
