= Roger Bush (priest) =

Dean of Truro

Roger Charles Bush (born 22 November 1956) is a British Anglican priest. Having been a parish priest, he was Archdeacon of Cornwall from 2006 to 2012. He was then Dean of Truro, the head of Truro Cathedral in the Church of England's Diocese of Truro, from 2012 to 2022.

== Biography ==
Bush was born on 22 November 1956. He was educated at Fakenham Grammar School, a grammar school in Fakenham, Norfolk. He studied at King's College London, graduating with a Bachelor of Arts (BA) degree in 1978. From 1983 to 1986, he trained for ordination at the College of the Resurrection, Mirfield. He also studied at the University of Leeds, graduating with a further BA in 1985.

Bush was ordained in the Church of England as a deacon in 1986 and as a priest in 1987. He was a curate at Newbold, Derbyshire before becoming a team vicar in the Parish of the Resurrection, Leicester, and then Rector of Redruth, Cornwall. He was a canon residentiary at Truro Cathedral from 2004 to 2006, when he became Archdeacon of Cornwall. On 22 September 2012, he was instituted Dean of Truro. He retired from full-time ministry at the end of September 2022.

Church of England titles
Preceded by Chris Hardwick	Dean of Truro; 2012–2022	Succeeded by Simon Robinson
