= Chris Hardwick (priest) =

Dean of Truro

Christopher George Hardwick was the Dean of Truro from 2005 until 2011.

Born on October 7, 1957, Hardwick was educated at King Edward VI School (Lichfield) and the Open University. He initially pursued a career in banking before deciding to follow a calling to the church. He studied at Ripon College Cuddesdon and was ordained in 1992. He began his ministry as a curate at Worcester, later becoming the Rector of Hill Croome before his move to the Deanery of Truro.

In 2010, Hardwick took a temporary suspension from his duties while he was investigated for a supposedly controversial personal relationship, and ultimately resigned in August 2011.

== Notes ==
Church of England titles
Preceded by Michael Anthony Moxon	Dean of Truro; 2005–2011	Succeeded by Roger Bush
