= George Hall (bishop of Chester) =

English bishop

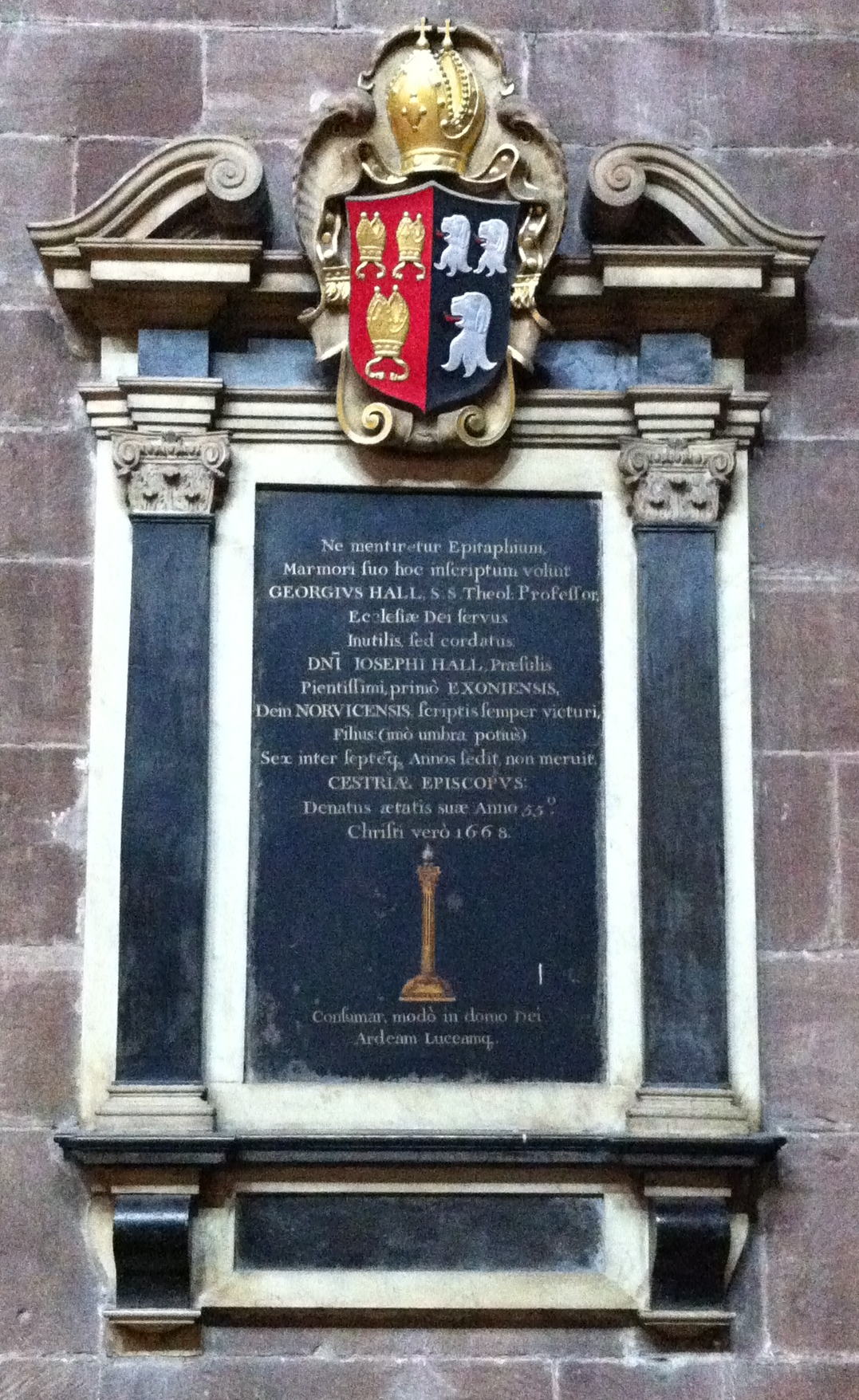
Mural monument to Bishop George Hall, Chester Cathedral

George Hall (c. 1613–1668) was an English bishop.

== Life ==
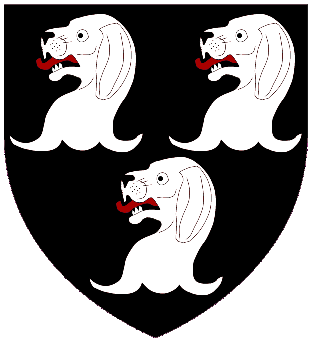
Arms: Sable three talbots' heads erased Argent langued Gules.

His father was Joseph Hall. George Hall was born at Waltham Abbey, Essex, and studied at Exeter College, Oxford, where he became a Fellow. He became vicar of Menheniot and in 1641 archdeacon of Cornwall.

Having been deprived of office under the Commonwealth, he became a lecturer at St Bartholomew-by-the-Exchange, and then vicar of St. Botolph's, Aldersgate.

He was appointed to the seventh stall in St George's Chapel, Windsor Castle in 1660 and held this until 1662.

He was appointed bishop of Chester in 1662. He was at the same time rector of Wigan, and archdeacon of Canterbury (from 1660). He died in an accident with a knife.

== Notes ==
Church of England titles
Preceded by Henry Ferne	Bishop of Chester; 1662–1668	Succeeded by John Wilkins
