= Roger Alley =

English cleric (1545–1610)

Rector, St. Ervan
- In office 1561–1610

Archdeacon of Cornwall
- In office 1563–1570

Vicar, Otterton
- In office 1568–1590

Prebendary, Exeter Cathedral
- In office 1568–1574

Vicar, Gorran
- In office 1569–1570

Rector, Pyworthy
- In office 1596–1610

Personal details
- Born: c. 1545 Devon, England
- Died: 1610 England
- Parent: William Alley
- Occupation: Church of England, priest, ordained 1566

Roger Alley (c.1545–1610) was an English cleric. He held several ecclesiastical appointments in the diocese of his father, William Alley, the Bishop of Exeter.

== Life ==
Alley was born in Devon in about 1545, the son of Sybil Bodleigh Honacott and William Alley, then Rector of St. Peter's Church, Oakford, Devon. (Note: By some accounts, Roger Alley was born in 1535 to William Alley and Sibyl Bodleigh; however, he was reported to be 21 years old when ordained in 1566, suggesting birth in about 1544. Before passage of the Clergy Marriage Act of 1548, clerics were forbidden to marry and required to be celibate. William Alley married Sibyl Honacott in 1549, and refers to his stepson Christopher Bodleigh in his will (1570). It seems likely that Christopher was Sybil's son by a previous relationship.) Roger attended Exeter College, Oxford, although it is not clear that he completed a degree. As A.L. Rowse observed, the bishop was "rather overmuch given to the pleasures of nepotism", appointing his son Rector of St. Ervan parish, Cornwall in 1561, and Archdeacon of Cornwall in 1563, while Roger was still but a scholar. Ordained a priest in 1566, at age 21, his subsequent appointments included Prebendary of Exeter Cathedral (1568-74), Vicar in Otterton, Devon (1568-90), and Vicar in Gorran, Cornwall (1569-70). Following the Bishop's death in 1570, his successor deprived Roger of his archdeaconry. He was appointed as Rector of St. Swithin's in Pyworthy, Devon in 1576, where he served until he died in 1610.
