= Henry de Bolleghe =

Archdeacon of Totnes

Henry de Bolleghe (also Thomas and de Bolley) was Archdeacon of Totnes during 1275.
