= Decimo =

Decimo Ltd was a British electronics manufacturer.

Decimo was founded by Douglas Dorsett in the 1970s, and the company was based in Luton, Bedfordshire, England.

== Vatman ==
Vatman was a brand of pocket calculator produced by Decimo and made in Japan.
