= Thomas Somaster =

English priest

Thomas Somaster was a 16th century English priest.

Somaster was born at Painsford, Ashprington He was a Fellow of All Souls College, Oxford. He held the living at Cornwood. He was Archdeacon of Cornwall from 1571 to 1603.
