= Edward Drew (priest) =

Edward Drew was an Anglican priest in England during the late 17th and early 18th centuries.

Drew was born in Devon and educated at Exeter College, Oxford. He held livings at Lezant and Bridestowe. He became a Canon of Exeter Cathedral in 1671 and Archdeacon of Cornwall from 1633 to 1667. He died on 17 December 1714.
