= Alice Bradbridge =

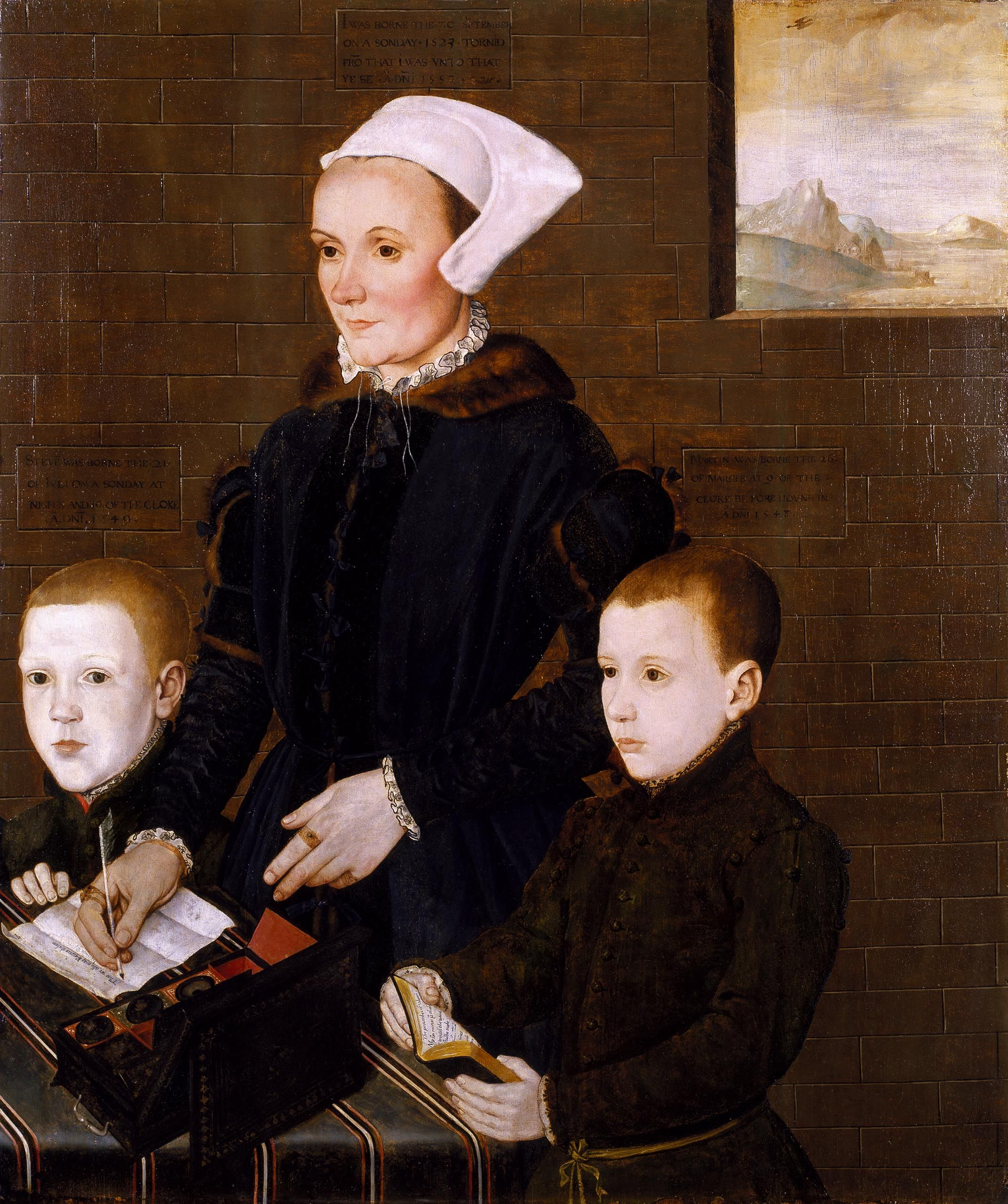
Alice Barnham and her sons Martin and Steven (c.1557) by an unknown artist.

Alice Barnham (née Bradbridge; 7 September 1523 – May 1604) was an English silk merchant, and a leading figure in the London silk trade from the 1560s onward. She is chiefly remembered for commissioning a family portrait in 1557 which is one of the earliest family portraits of English origins.

== Biography ==
Alice, born in Chichester, Sussex on 7 September 1523. She was one of the youngest of the fourteen children of William Bradbridge (d. 1546), a successful and prosperous mercer, and his wife, Alice.

Alice married Francis Barnham (1515/16–1576), a draper and a London alderman most likely in the years 1546 or 1547. (Note: Francis's father was probably Steven Barnham who had attended court but had fallen on hard times. Francis initially joined the royal household but left to pursue a living in the City of London as draper (Orlin 2010).) Francis Barnham owned a house on St Clement's Lane, Eastcheap that been the London residence of the Abbot of Stratford Langthorne.

Under the rules of the time Francis as a draper merchant was prohibited from keeping a shop. To circumvent this rule Alice ran the retail branch of the family business and was considered to be a professional silkwoman.

Despite being married, she was herself active as a merchant and silkwoman. Silkwomen were permitted to trade in London with financial independence from their husbands, a relaxation of the property laws known as coverture. Her business transactions can be traced in historical documents. Alice Barnham was allowed to access a room for business use at the Worshipful Company of Drapers as a "sister" of the company.

The couple were successful financially (by 1576 the year that Francis died their income was around £1000 per annum) and rose in society. They were able to make loans which enabled the social ambitions of aristocratic families. Francis was granted a coat of arms in 1561 and the two oldest Barnham sons became country gentlemen.

Francis Barnham died in 1576 aged sixty and was buried on 23 May at the parish church of St Clement Eastcheap. His tomb was destroyed in the Great Fire of London. Alice Barnham died in 1604 and was buried on 14 May.

She planned to marry the former Lord Mayor of London, Thomas Ramsey, but discontinued the plans. It was said that she objected to Ramsey after he scrutinised her the jointure property left to her by her first husband.

Alice Barnham died in May 1604.

== Portrait ==
The family portrait is now exhibited at the Denver Art Museum in Colorado. Prior to its purchase in 1998 it hung in Boughton Monchelsea Place, a Kent country house inherited by Sir Francis Barnham in 1613.

The subjects of the painting had been mislabelled as Lady Ingram and her Two Boys Martin and Steven for many years due to a paper tag placed on the back of the painting in 1660. This attribution probably occurred because of the close family ties between the Ingram and Barnham families. It has now been relabelled Alice Barnham and her Sons Martin and Steven (1557), because of information contained within trompe-l'œil inscriptions on the painting.

== Family ==
Of their four sons the third Anthony, probably died soon after his baptism on 18 March 1558, the youngest of the four Benedict (baptised 1559), was a very successful London merchant who amassed one of the great city fortunes of the period, his eldest daughter Elizabeth married Lord Audley the future 2nd Earl of Castlehaven.

Martin (died 1610) — a note on the painting says "Martin was born the 26 of March at 9 of the clock before noon in Anno Domini 1548") — became sheriff of Kent in 1598, was knighted in 1603.

Steven (died 1608) — a note on the painting says "Steven was born the 21 of July on a Sunday at night and 10 of the clock Anno Domini 1549" — became MP for Chichester.
