= Michael Moxon =

Dean of Truro (1998–2004)

Michael Anthony Moxon (23 January 1942 – 28 July 2019) was Dean of Truro from 1998 until his resignation in 2004.

He was educated at Merchant Taylors, Durham University and Heythrop College, London. Ordained in 1971 he was a curate at Lowestoft then Sacrist of St Paul's Cathedral, Vicar of Tewkesbury and Canon of Windsor 1996 - 1998 before his move to Truro.
