= Sydney Kirkby =

Australian bishop (1879–1935)

Sydney James Kirkby
- Born: 24 January 1879; Sandhurst, Victoria
- Died: 12 July 1935; Sydney, Australia
- Venerated in: Anglican Church of Australia
- Feast: 13 July

Sydney James Kirkby (24 January 1879 – 12 July 1935) was a bishop of the Church of England in Australia and Tasmania (now renamed the Anglican Church of Australia).

== Early life ==
He was born in Sandhurst (now Bendigo), Victoria, the eleventh child of Joseph Kirkby, a clerk, and his wife Alice Maude Paine Kirkby, both natives of England. Six of the couple's previous children had not survived. Kirkby was educated at Gravel Hill State School, where he was profoundly influenced by the Reverend Herbert Begbie toward the religious life, to the point of becoming a lay reader in 1902.

He was sent by Bishop Langley to Moore Theological College in Sydney, where he proved a very capable student. He was selected as an Abbott scholar and senior student for 1905 and was one of the few students who took a first in the Oxford and Cambridge preliminary examination.

== Church work ==
He returned to Bendigo, and was made a deacon on 24 December 1905, and placed at Pyramid Hill, Victoria. Almost a year later, on 17 October 1906, he married Victoria Ethel Godfrey. On 21 December he was made a priest by Archbishop Henry Lowther Clarke and became the rector of the church at Malmsbury, Victoria. While he proved himself to be a vigorous pastor with a deep spiritual dimension, his scholastic temperament and abilities remained strong. In 1911 he returned to Moore College, where he served as a tutor and acting principal. There he took advantage of the school's recent affiliation with Durham University in England to continue his education with a diploma in theology. He travelled to England in 1912, studying at the university and graduated with a Bachelor of Arts degree. Upon his return to Sydney, he again taught at the College despite his misgivings about some of the theological views of the college's then principal, liberal evangelical D. J. Davies.

In 1914 he returned to pastoral duties at St Anne's church in Ryde, New South Wales. Kirkby was a popular preacher, and a capable administrator and efficient organizer. A devout Evangelical, he was particularly interested in promoting that tradition through the work of the Anglican Church League and similar groups. He also believed that Evangelicals had a role to play in the missions in the Outback. In 1920 the Bush Church Aid Society for Australia and Tasmania was founded, with pledged support from the Colonial and Continental Church Society in England. Kirkby was installed as the group's executive officer. The new group did not have widespread support from the Anglican clergy of Australia, Archbishop John Charles Wright of Sydney being one of its few supporters.

In 1932 he was reassigned to diocesan work. He was already the part-time archdeacon of Camden, New South Wales and was now appointed coadjutor bishop of Sydney, with a specific assignment to St Philip's Church, Sydney. He was consecrated to the new post on 24 August and formally became the acting bishop on the death of Archbishop Wright the following February.

At St Philip's Kirkby proved to be quite popular, with his weekday lunchtime services attracting large numbers of people. In his position as coadjutor he worked to address the financial and social problems the church was having, worsened by the ongoing Great Depression. He also worked on constitutional reform.

Kirkby had the duty of presiding over the election of the new archbishop to replace Archbishop Wright. He was himself nominated for the post, against his own wishes, but successfully worked to limit his own chances of getting the post. He also helped bring the synod through an exhausting session which gave the post to Bishop Howard Mowll of West China, through a skillfully managed effort behind the scenes. The election of Mowll to the post caused a split among the Evangelicals in the area, which Kirkby, despite his popularity with the people and the clergy and common sense, would prove to be unable to heal.

== Death and legacy ==
Mowll was enthroned as archbishop in March 1934 and Kirkby continued as an assistant to the new archbishop, although he was much more personally interested in his work with his congregation at St Philip's. He was afflicted with chronic nephritis, which led to his death in Royal Prince Alfred Hospital on 12 July 1935. He was survived by his wife, two sons and two daughters.

He was buried in the grounds of his beloved St Philip's and is commemorated in the calendar of the Anglican Church of Australia on 13 July.

== Sources ==
- Sydney James Kirkby at the Australian Dictionary of Biography online
