= Calendar of saints (Anglican Church of Australia) =

Anglican Church of Australia calendar

The calendar of the Anglican Church of Australia, follows Anglican tradition with the addition of significant people and events in the church in Australia.

Principal festivals (principal holy days) may not be displaced. Festivals (holy days), if falling on a Sunday, may be displaced to a following weekday. The celebration of lesser festivals (commemorations) is optional.

== Principal festivals ==
Most of these are moveable feasts.

- Easter
- Ascension
- Pentecost
- Trinity Sunday
- All Saints' Day, 1 November
- Christmas, 25 December
- Epiphany, 6 January
- Baptism of Jesus
- Ash Wednesday
- Maundy Thursday
- Good Friday

== Festivals ==
- The Naming and Circumcision of Jesus, 1 January
- The Presentation of Christ in the Temple, 2 February
- Matthias, 24 February or 14 May
- Joseph, 19 March
- The Annunciation to Mary, 25 March
- Mark the Evangelist, 25 April (or 26 April if ANZAC Day is observed on the 25th)
- Philip and James, 1 May or 3 May
- Barnabas, 11 June
- The Birth of John the Baptist, 24 June
- Peter and Paul, 29 June
- Mary Magdalene, 22 July
- James, 25 July
- Transfiguration of Jesus, 6 August
- Mary (mother of Jesus), 15 August
- Bartholomew, 24 August
- Matthew, 21 September
- Michael and All Angels, 29 September
- Luke, 18 October
- Simon and Jude, 28 October
- Andrew, 30 November
- Thomas, 21 December or 3 July
- Stephen, 26 December or 3 August
- John the Evangelist, 27 December or 6 May
- Holy Innocents, 28 December

== Calendar of festivals and saints ==
Bold type indicates festivals and principal festivals.

=== January ===
- 1: **The Naming and Circumcision of Jesus**
- 2: Basil of Caesarea and Gregory of Nazianzus, bishops and teachers (died 379 and 389)
- 2: Eliza Marsden Hassall, missionary (died 1917)
- 6: **Epiphany**
- 10: William Laud, archbishop of Canterbury, martyr (died 1645)
- 13: Hilary of Poitiers, bishop and teacher (died 367)
- 14: Sava, archbishop (died 1235)
- 17: Anthony the Great, abbot (died 356)
- 18: Confession of Peter
- 21: Agnes, martyr (died 304)
- 22: Vincent of Saragossa, deacon and martyr (died 304)
- 24: Companions of Paul, including Timothy, Titus and Silas
- 25: Conversion of Paul
- 26: Australia Day
- 27: John Chrysostom, bishop and teacher (died 407)
- 28: Thomas Aquinas, theologian (died 1274)
- 30: Charles I of England, King of England, martyr (died 1649)

=== February ===
- 2: **The Presentation of Christ in the Temple**
- 3: First Anglican service at Sydney Cove
- 4: Ansgar, bishop (died 865)
- 5: Martyrs of Japan (died 1597)
- 14: Cyril (died 869) and Methodius (died 885), missionaries
- 20: William Grant Broughton, first bishop of Australia (died 1853)
- 23: Polycarp, bishop and martyr (died c. 155)
- 24: **Matthias** (alternative date: 14 May)
- 27: George Herbert, priest and poet (died 1633)

=== March ===
- 1: David, bishop (died c. 589)
- 2: Chad, bishop (died 672)
- 7: Perpetua and her companions, martyrs (died 203)
- 8: John of God, worker among the sick and poor (died 1550)
- 9: Sister Emma, Superior of the Society of the Sacred Advent (died 1939)
- 17: Patrick, bishop and missionary (died 461)
- 18: Cyril of Jerusalem, bishop and teacher (died 386)
- 19: **Joseph**
- 20: Cuthbert of Lindisfarne, bishop and missionary (died 687)
- 21: Thomas Cranmer, archbishop of Canterbury, martyr and liturgist (died 1556)
- 24: Paul Couturier, ecumenist (died 1953)
- 25: **The Annunciation to the Blessed Virgin Mary**
- 29: John Keble, priest (died 1866)

=== April ===
- 3: Richard of Chichester, bishop (died 1253)
- 6: Frederic Barker, bishop of Sydney (died 1882)
- 8: Georgiana Molloy, church leader and botanist (died 1843)
- 9: William Law, priest and teacher (died 1761)
- 9: Dietrich Bonhoeffer, theologian (died 1945)
- 11: George Augustus Selwyn, missionary, bishop of New Zealand (died 1878)
- 21: Anselm, archbishop of Canterbury, teacher (died 1109)
- 23: George, martyr (died c. 303)
- 24: Óscar Romero, archbishop of San Salvador (died 1980)
- 25: **Mark** (died evangelist and martyr) (alternative date: 26 April)
- 25: ANZAC Day
- 29: Catherine of Siena, spiritual teacher (died 1380)

=== May ===
- 1: **Philip and James**, apostles and martyrs (alternative date: 3 May)
- 2: Athanasius, bishop of Alexandria, teacher (died 373)
- 6: **John** (died apostle evangelist) (alternative date: 27 December)
- 8: Julian of Norwich, mystic (died c. 1416)
- 14: **Matthias** (alternative date: 24 February)
- 19: Dunstan, archbishop of Canterbury (died 988)
- 24: John (died 1791) and Charles Wesley (died 1788), evangelists
- 25: Bede of Jarrow , priest and teacher (died 735)
- 26: Augustine of Canterbury, missionary and bishop (died c. 605)
- 27 May to 3 June: Week of Prayer for Reconciliation
- 31: The Visitation of the Blessed Virgin Mary to Elizabeth

=== June ===
- 1: Justin Martyr (died 165)
- 3: Martyrs of Uganda (died 1885 to 1887)
- 3: Janani Luwum, archbishop of Uganda (died 1977)
- 3: John XXIII, bishop of Rome, reformer (died 1963)
- 5: Boniface of Mainz, bishop and martyr (died 754)
- 9: Columba of Iona, abbot and missionary (died 597)
- 11: **Barnabas**, apostle and martyr (died 61)
- 13: Anthony of Padua, missionary and preacher (died 1231)
- 15: Evelyn Underhill, spiritual writer (died 1941)
- 22: Alban, martyr (died c. 209)
- 24: **The Birth of John the Baptist**
- 27: Cyril of Alexandria, bishop and teacher (died 444)
- 28: Irenaeus, bishop and teacher (died c. 200)
- 29: **Peter and Paul**, apostles and martyrs

=== July ===
- 1: first missionaries to the Torres Strait
- 3: **Thomas**, martyr (alternative date: 21 December)
- 6: John Fisher and Thomas More, martyrs (died 1535)
- 11: Benedict of Nursia, abbot (died c. 550)
- 13: Sydney James Kirkby, bishop (died 1935)
- 22: **Mary Magdalene**
- 25: **James**, apostle and martyr (died 44)
- 26: Anne, mother of the Blessed Virgin Mary
- 29: Mary and Martha of Bethany
- 30: William Wilberforce, social reformer (died 1833)
- 31: Joseph of Arimathea
- 31: Ignatius of Loyola, priest, founder of the Society of Jesus (died 1556)

=== August ===
- 1: Holy men and women of the Old Testament
- 3: **Stephen**, martyr (alternative date: 26 December)
- 4: Jean Vianney, parish priest (died 1895)
- 5: Oswald of Northumbria, king and martyr (died 642)
- 6: **Transfiguration of Jesus**
- 8: Dominic, priest and friar (died 1221)
- 9: Mary Sumner, founder of the Mothers' Union (died 1921)
- 10: Laurence, deacon and martyr (died 258)
- 11: Clare of Assisi (died 1252)
- 11: John Henry Newman, cardinal and theologian (died 1890)
- 13: Jeremy Taylor, bishop and spiritual writer (died 1667)
- 14: Twentieth-century martyrs, including Maximilian Kolbe, Maria Skobtsova and Martin Luther King Jr.
- 15: **Mary, mother of the Lord**
- 20: Bernard of Clairvaux, abbot and teacher (died 1153)
- 24: **Bartholomew**, apostle and martyr
- 27: Monica, mother of Augustine (died 387)
- 28: Augustine of Hippo, bishop and teacher (died 430)
- 29: Beheading of John the Baptist
- 31: John Bunyan, preacher and spiritual writer (died 1688)
- 31: Aidan of Lindisfarne, bishop and missionary (died 651)

=== September ===
- 2: Martyrs of New Guinea (died 1942)
- 3: Gregory of Rome, bishop and teacher (died 604)
- 3: Eliza Darling, social reformer in New South Wales (died 1868)
- 8: **Birth of Mary, mother of the Lord**
- 11: Mother Esther, founder of the Community of the Holy Name (died 1931)
- 13: Cyprian of Carthage, bishop and martyr (died 258)
- 14: Holy Cross
- 15: John Oliver Feetham, bishop and bush brother (died 1947)
- 16: Ninian of Galloway, bishop and missionary (died c. 432)
- 17: Hildegard of Bingen, abbess and spiritual writer (died 1179)
- 18: John Ramsden Wollaston, priest and missionary of Western Australia (died 1856)
- 20: John Coleridge Patteson, first bishop of Melanesia, martyr (died 1871)
- 21: **Matthew** (died apostle, evangelist and martyr)
- 25: Sergius of Moscow, abbot and teacher (died 1392)
- 26: Lancelot Andrewes, bishop of Winchester (died 1626)
- 27: Vincent de Paul, priest and worker with the poor (died 1660)
- 29: **Michael and All Angels**
- 30: Jerome, priest and biblical scholar (died 420)

=== October ===
- 4: Francis of Assisi, friar and preacher (died 1226)
- 6: William Tyndale, biblical scholar (died 1536)
- 12: Elizabeth Fry, prison reformer (died 1845)
- 15: Teresa of Avila (died 1592), teacher
- 16: Hugh Latimer and Nicholas Ridley, bishops and martyrs (died 1555)
- 17: Ignatius of Antioch, bishop and martyr (died c. 107)
- 18: **Luke**, evangelist and martyr
- 19: Henry Martyn, missionary and Bible translator (died 1812)
- 23: James of Jerusalem, brother of the Lord, martyr (died c. 62)
- 24: United Nations
- 28: **Simon and Jude**, apostles and martyrs
- 31: Martin Luther and other Continental Reformers

=== November ===
- 1: **All Saints' Day**
- 2: All Souls' Day
- 3: Richard Hooker, priest and teacher (died 1600)
- 8: Saints, martyrs, missionaries and teachers of the Anglican Communion
- 10: Leo of Rome, bishop and teacher (died 461)
- 11: Martin of Tours, bishop (died 397)
- 12: Charles Simeon, evangelist (died 1836)
- 16: Margaret of Scotland, queen, helper of the poor (died 1093)
- 17: Hilda of Whitby, abbess (died 680)
- 17: Hugh of Lincoln, bishop (died 1200)
- 19: Elisabeth of Hungary, princess and philanthropist (died 1231)
- 23: Clement of Rome, bishop and martyr (died c. 100)
- 25: James Noble, first indigenous Australian ordained (died 1941)
- 30: **Andrew**

=== December ===
- 2: Frances Perry, founder of the Royal Women's Hospital, Melbourne (died 1892)
- 3: Francis Xavier, priest and missionary (died 1552)
- 4: Nicholas Ferrar, deacon and man of prayer (died 1637)
- 6: Nicholas of Myra, bishop and philanthropist (died 343)
- 7: Ambrose of Milan, bishop and teacher (died 397)
- 8: The Conception of the Blessed Virgin Mary
- 8: Richard Baxter, pastor and spiritual writer (died 1691)
- 13: Lucy, martyr and virgin (died 304)
- 14: John of the Cross, mystic and teacher (died 1591)
- 21: **Thomas**, martyr (alternative date: 3 July)
- 25: **Christmas**
- 26: **Stephen**, martyr (alternative date: 3 August)
- 27: **John the Evangelist**, apostle and evangelist (alternative date: 6 May)
- 28: **Holy Innocents**
- 29: Thomas Becket, archbishop of Canterbury, martyr (died 1170)
- 30: Josephine Butler, social reformer (died 1906)
- 31: John Wycliffe, teacher and reformer (died 1384)
