= Mowll =

Mowll is a surname. Notable people with the surname include:

- Dorothy Anne Mowll (1890–1957), English Christian missionary, wife of Howard
- Edward Mowll (1881–1964), English Anglican bishop
- Howard Mowll (1890–1958), Australian Anglican Archbishop of Sydney
- Joshua Mowll (born 1970), British children’s author

== See also ==
- Moll (surname)
