= Thomas Morley (disambiguation) =

Thomas Morley (1557/8–1602) was an English composer.

Thomas Morley may also refer to:

- Thomas Morley, 4th Baron Morley (1354–1416), baron in the Peerage of England
- Thomas Morley, 5th Baron Morley (1393–1435), baron in the Peerage of England
- Thomas Morley (bishop) (died 1561), Bishop of Marlborough, 1537–1561
- Thomas Morley (cricketer) (1863–1919), English first-class cricketer for Nottinghamshire
- Thomas Morley (1513–1559), MP for Arundel
