= Alfred Earle (bishop) =

British bishop

- Bishop of Marlborough
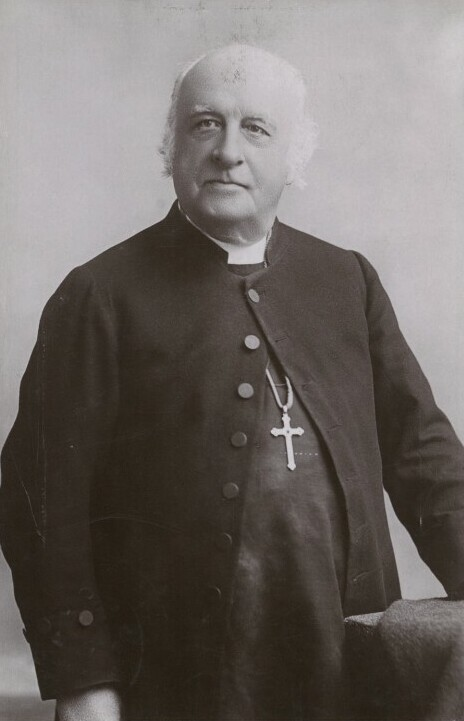
- Diocese: London
- In office: 1888–1918
- Other posts: Archdeacon of Totnes (1872–1888); Dean of Exeter (1900–1918)

Orders
- Ordination: 1858
- Consecration: 1888 by Edward Benson

Personal details
- Born: 22 December 1827
- Died: 28 December 1918 (aged 91) Torquay, England
- Denomination: Anglican
- Parents: Henry Earle
- Education: Hertford College, Oxford

Alfred Earle (22 December 1827 – 28 December 1918) was the Bishop of Marlborough from 1888 to his death.

He was born the son of surgeon Henry Earle and was educated at Eton College and Hertford College, Oxford. He was ordained in 1858 and was a Curate of St Edmund's Salisbury and then Rector of Monkton Farleigh (1863–1865) before becoming vicar of West Alvington, South Huish, and South Milton. He then spent fifteen years in Totnes, as, from approximately October 1872 until his consecration in 1888, the Archdeacon of Totnes, and where he also became a rural dean and a Canon Residentiary of Exeter Cathedral (1886–1888).

He was consecrated a bishop by Edward Benson, Archbishop of Canterbury, at St Paul's Cathedral on St Matthias' day (24 February) 1888. As Bishop of Marlborough, he was suffragan to Frederick Temple and Mandell Creighton as successive Bishops of London, and was given charge of the western part of the Diocese of London. Alongside his bishopric, he also held two successive livings: Rector of St Michael, Cornhill (1888–1895), and Rector of St Botolph-without-Bishopsgate and a Prebendary of St Paul's (1896–1900). Earle was often in ill-health during this period, and Alfred Barry (former Primate of Australia) frequently deputised for him; when Earle resigned his responsibilities for West London in June 1900, Barry took these up (but not the See).

Installed as Dean of Exeter on 28 August 1900, Earle left London but nominally retained his see until his death. He resigned the deanery during 1918, and died at the end of the year, at Torquay, Devon, in the week following his 91st birthday.

Church of England titles
Preceded by John Downall	Archdeacon of Totnes; 1872–1888	Succeeded by Charles Wilkinson
In abeyance Title last held by Thomas Lancaster	Bishop of Marlborough; 1888–1918	In abeyance
Preceded by Benjamin Cowie	Dean of Exeter; 1900–1918	Succeeded by Henry Gamble
