= James Earle =

British surgeon

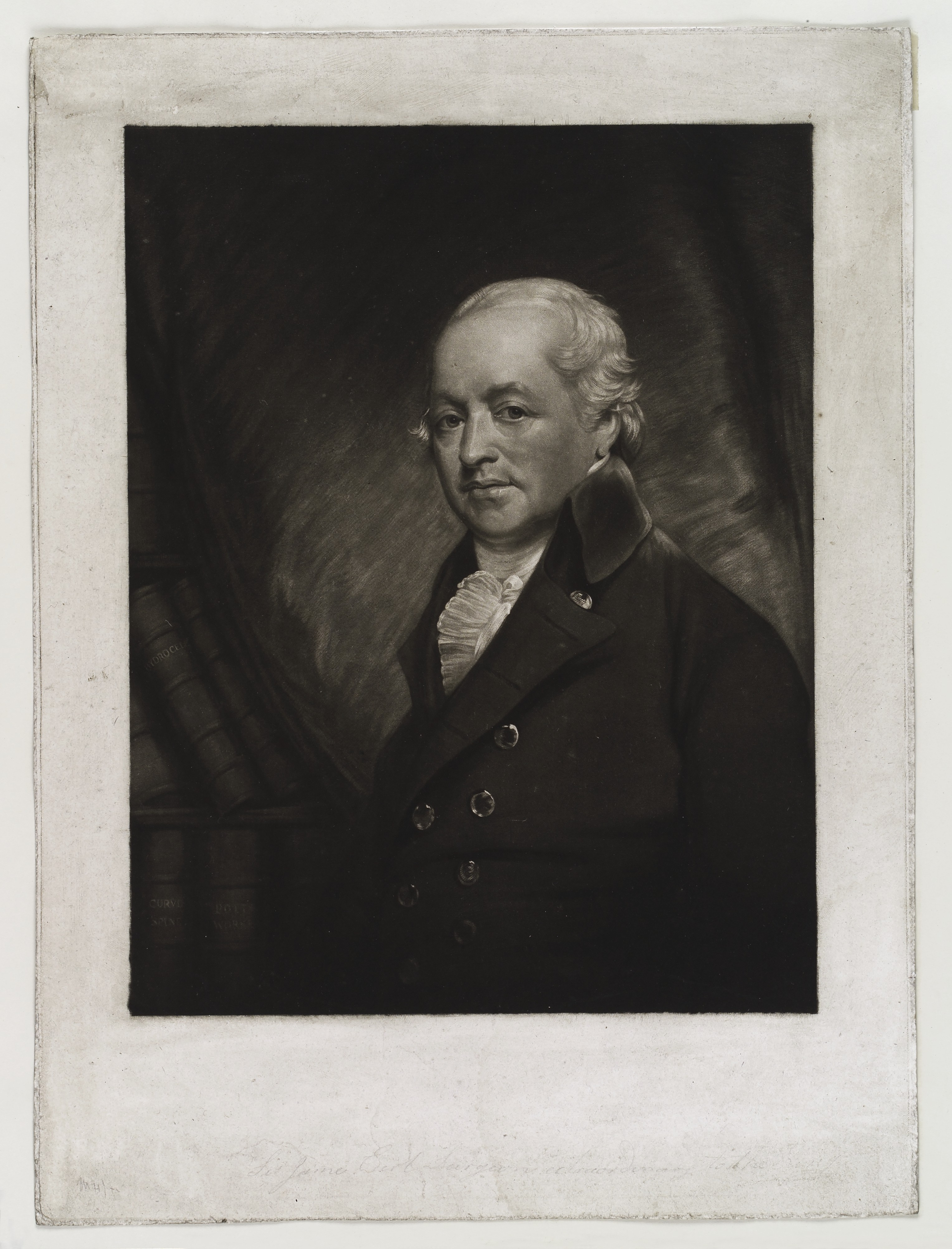
Portrait. Credit: Wellcome Collection

Sir James Earle (1755–1817) was a celebrated British surgeon, renowned for his skill in lithotomy.

Earle was born in London. After studying medicine at St Bartholomew's Hospital, he became the institution's assistant surgeon in 1770. Due to the temporary incapacity of one of the hospital's surgeons, Earle performed one-third of St Bartholomew's operations between 1776 and 1784. At the end of this phenomenal feat, Earle was elected a surgeon on 22 May 1784 and remained until 1815. Just two years later, he was appointed surgeon-extraordinary to George III.

In March 1794 Earle was elected a fellow of the Royal Society. He was knighted in 1807. He married the daughter of Percivall Pott, the hospital's senior surgeon, and their third son, Henry Earle, also became a surgeon at St Bartholomew's.

Earle wrote a memoir of Pott that was subsequently attached to his complete works (1790) and a biography of William Austin. Earle was renowned for his surgery skills, particularly in lithotomy. He also published several medical works: A Treatise on the Hydrocele (1791, with additions in 1793, 1796, and 1805), Practical Observations on the Operation for Stone (1793), A New Method of Operation for Cataract (1801), and Letter on Fractures of the Lower Limbs (1807).
