= Dorothy Anne Mowll =

English missionary (1890–1957)

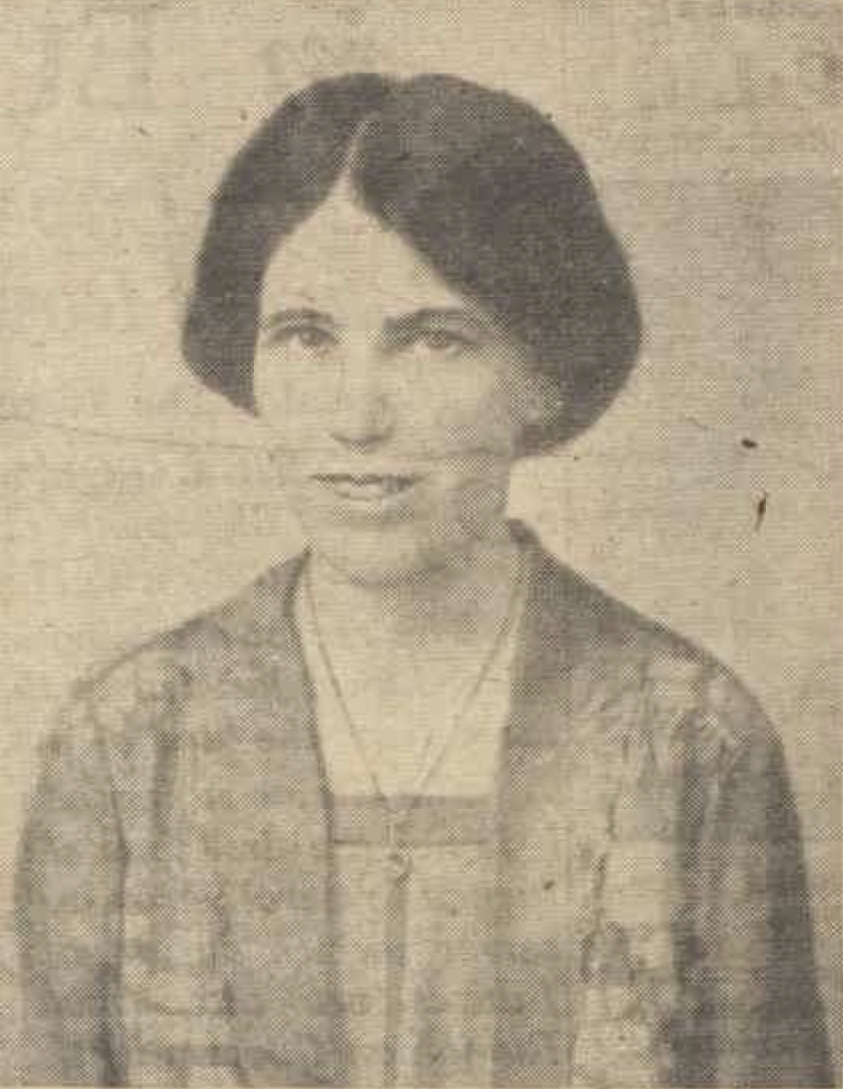
- Dorothy Anne Mowll 1934
- Born: Dorothy Anne Martin; 18 June 1890; Bath, England
- Died: 23 December 1957 (aged 67); Sydney, New South Wales
- Spouse: Howard Mowll (m. 1924)
- Parents: John Martin 1857-1921; Eliza Anne Martin, née Goldie 1850-1894
- Relatives: Sarah Elizabeth 1886-1924 (sister); Dr John Aston Martin 1887-1965 (brother); Francis Henry Martin 1888-1917 (brother); Cyril Gordon Martin VC 1891-1980 (brother); Olive Goldie Martin 1892-1994 (sister)

Signature
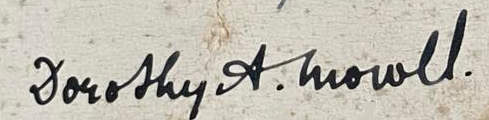

Dorothy Anne Mowll nee Martin (18 June 1890 — 23 December 1957) was an English missionary to China before moving to Sydney where her legacy includes the Anglican Retirement Villages, the Church of England National Emergency Fund, Gilbulla conference centre and extensions to Deer Park.

She was the fourth of six children born over a six year period to missionary parents, John and Eliza, working in Fuzhou, China. In 1894, when Eliza died, they were sent to Bath to be looked after by aunts. Her father, Rev John Martin, remarried in 1911 and remained in Fuzhou until 1916.

From the age of 18 until 25 she obtained a Kindergarten Certificate, followed by a Teacher Training Diploma of the National Froebel Union, and then, finally gained medical experience at the Bermondsey Medical Mission.

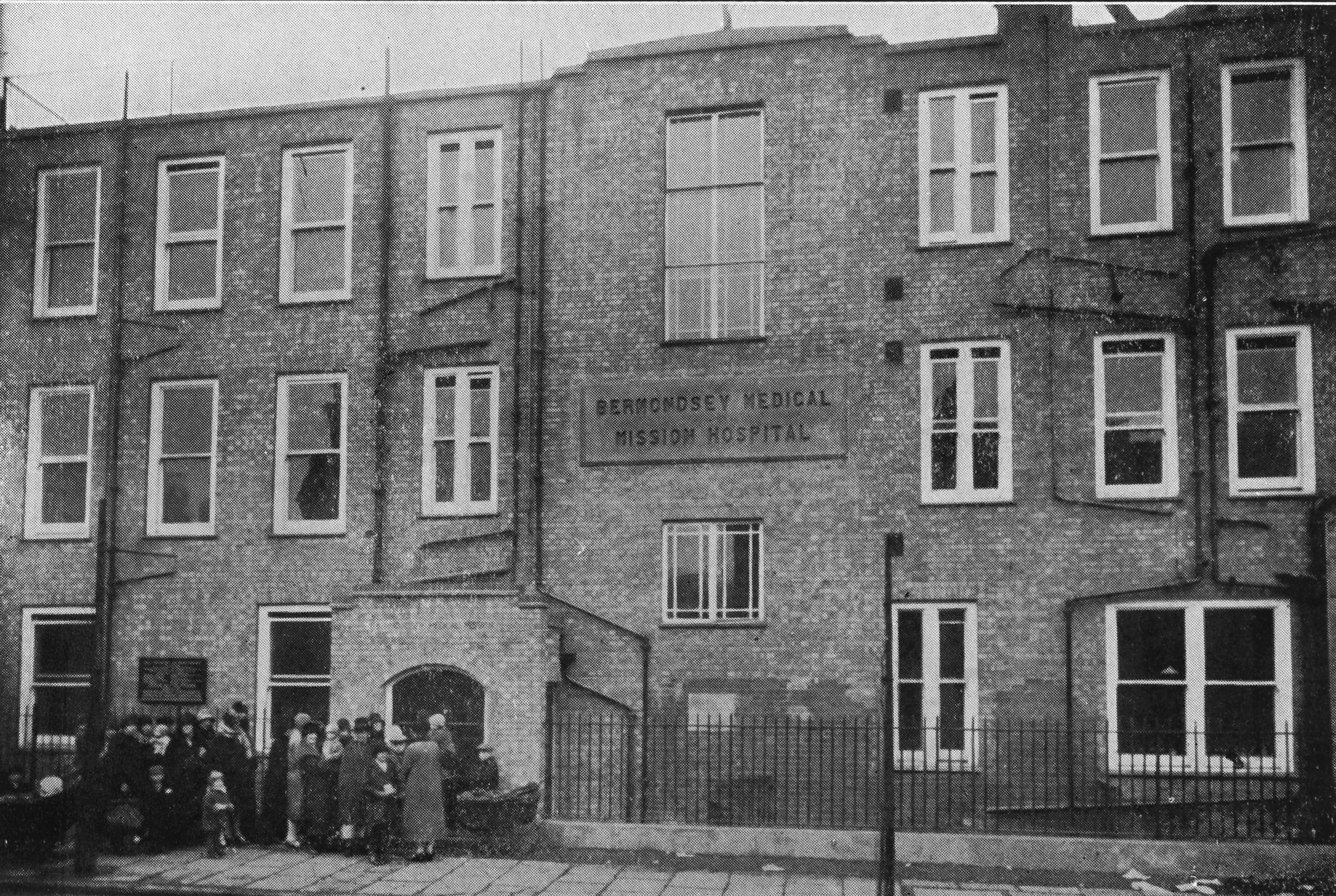
Bermondsey Medical Mission Hospital, London, 1929 Wellcome L0038385

== China ==
At age 25, in 1915, she joined the Church Missionary Society (CMS) and went to the Province of Sichuan in China, where she would work for the next twenty years. This period largely overlaps the Warlord Era with its widespread violence, chaos, and oppression.

Her main roles prior to 1924 were teaching in schools and helping in outstations. While she was doing this she had opportunities to preach the gospel. In her 1919 annual report to CMS, she notes that she was made supervisor of primary schools.

She also managed to become fluent in Chinese and several dialects.

=== Travels in China ===
Dorothy is recorded as being based in Chungkianghsien (Chongqing) from 1917-19. During this time she was sent for one year to the more isolated and mountainous Longan (Longnan) and "visited villages on a pony where no missionary had ever been".

In 1920 she was in Anhsien (Anzhou), and then returned to England in June 1921, being robbed by river pirates on her way to the coast. and arriving just three weeks after her father died.

She returned to China in 1923 to work in Hanchow (Hangzhou). She was there, staying with Mrs Watt, when Messrs Mr Watt and Whiteside were murdered by brigands.

Map showing Anglican missions in Sichuan, 1926

== Marriage to Bishop Mowll ==
On 23 October 1924 she married Howard Mowll at Mienchu Sze, with the ceremony performed by Bishop William Cassels The marriage was repeated in the British Consulate-General in Chengtu in December 1924.

Together they were kidnapped for three weeks by the Red-lamp brigands, then, during a fight between war lords, their home was ransacked and all their possessions stolen. Also, on one river trip, six river pirates came on board and clubbed and stabbed Bp Mowll while Mrs Mowll was struck on the head.

She acted as a translator for her husband after their marriage.

== Fellow of Royal Geographical Society ==
Part of early twentieth century missionary activity was mapping new areas. It was an essential foundation if a society wanted to keep up with where mission activity was occurring, or could potentially go to.

Those who knew Dorothy said that she always had an interest in maps, and loved mountain scenery.

After her husband's election to Archbishop of Sydney, Dorothy gave her maps to the Royal Geographical Society, and Sir Hugh Edward Poynter, 3rd Baronet (of the Poynter Baronets) proposed her for a Fellowship. This was seconded by E. C. Courtenay Bell.

The records of the Royal Geographical Society state:

"(Mrs) Dorothy Anne Mowll

Wife of the Archbishop of Sydney, NSW

Reasons for being accepted to Fellowship: "Has travelled extensively in Western China, both independently and with her husband and has made maps showing mountains, rivers and principal towns, also roads with distances marked. Has explored certain mountainous country, made maps of the same. Is believed to have been the first white person in many such districts."

She became a Fellow in 1935 and remained so until her death in 1957.

== Australia ==
She arrived in Sydney on March 1, 1934 on the RMS Orford to begin life with Howard as the new Anglican Archbishop of Sydney. She lived there for the remainder of her life.

== World War II, CENEF and SDCA ==
To understand Dorothy Mowll's contribution to the war effort of the Anglican Diocese of Sydney, and her legacy, it is helpful to understand two organisations. The Church of England National Emergency Fund (CENEF) and the Sydney Diocesan Churchwomen's Association (SDCA).

When WWII started Archbishop Mowll recognised the need for "a special fund to provide, among other things, the stipends of military chaplains appointed for camp work and the cost of erecting and maintaining Church of England halls, refreshment and reading rooms at the larger camps, and one within the Cathedral grounds". This "special fund" was to be called the Church of England National Emergency Fund, and was set up as a voluntary organisation, with its own council, and not needing approval from General Synod for action. Its role in the vision was as a management charity, with no income and, at the start, no property. It persists to this day as a charity, registered as "CENEF Ordinance 1978 – Church Property Trust".

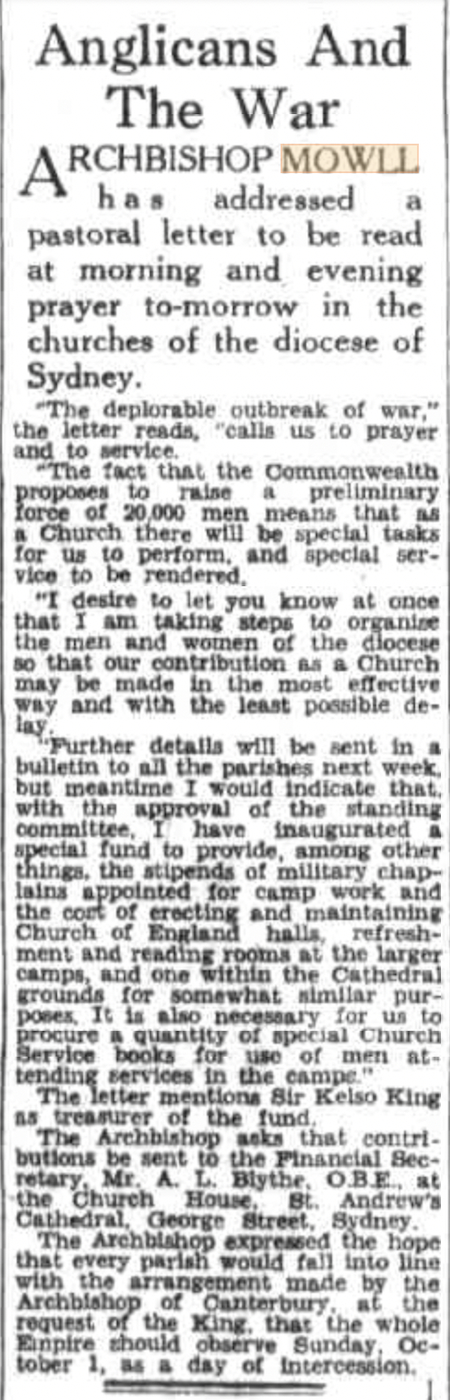
Daily News report 23/9/1939

‌As CENEF had no income, it required a donor and a source of volunteers, and so the SDCA was established:

"C.E.N.E.F. owed its success to its auxiliary, the Sydney Diocesan Churchwomen's Association (S. D. C. A.) which was founded by Mrs Dorothy Mowll in October 1939. Based in scores of parish branches and with a membership of over 9,000 throughout the diocese, these women voluntarily staffed the canteens and hostels of C.E.N.E.F., raised money for the Fund, and made comforts for distribution by chaplains at home and abroad."

Running either of CENEF or SDCA as a voluntary organisation, would have been a full time job, but Dorothy Mowll took on the presidency of both. The SDCA had 9,000 members, and up to a peak of 1700 volunteering at CENEF sites, with the Sydney Morning Herald reporting, in 1943, that in one of the six city huts they had served over a million meals to service personnel, with the maximum on one day being 2,685 meals. It is noted that they were hoping to buy a "washing-up machine", which means that the volunteers were not only cooking a million meals, they were washing the dishes - and taking home the bed linen to launder.

== Post-war ==
It is after WWII that Dorothy Mowll's enduring legacy begins, both because of funds raised for CENEF, and for her particular vision of housing for retirees. At the time there were some aged care homes, but only for singles.

After the war CENEF remained as a separate entity with its own council, and did not come under the Diocesan Synod's control until 1958, two months after Howard Mowll's death.

While it was separate, and under Dorothy Mowll's presidency, CENEF could decide how to use funds remaining after the war, and between 1945 and 1958 it bought:

1. 201 Castlereagh St Sydney

2. 2 roods and 251/4 perches (just over 1/2 acre) at Port Hacking (Rathane)

3. 17 acres at Menangle (a conference centre called Gilbulla)

4. 117 acres at Castle Hill called Elwatan

It is this last purchase that set in motion the final step of Dorothy's vision. The CENEF council had been discussing for years which site would be the best for the retirement village, but Dorothy's illness, followed quickly by Howard's decline, delayed plans. However, Howard's parish rector, Archdeacon Clive Goodwin, who was also on the CENEF council reported that Howard had said to him: "Clive, I want you to do something about Dorothy's unfinished task."

Within three weeks of Howard's death, CENEF had taken out a mortgage of 68,000 pounds to add to the 7,000 in hand to buy Elwatan. To put this financial bravery in perspective, the total raised by SDCA during the war was 50,000 pounds. The CENEF council could have been channelling Dorothy's view of ministry, when they made the purchase: "The frontiers of the Kingdom of God were never advanced by men and women of caution".

A month after the purchase, the Anglican Synod of Sydney, put CENEF, its properties and debts, under its management with the Church of England National Emergency Fund Ordinance 1958

The outcome of this is reported by Stephen Judd:

Mrs Dorothy Mowll's dream of providing for ministers and missionaries in their retirement had been transformed from one village in 1959 to an organisation catering for 3,500 residents in seventeen villages and five nursing homes with total annual expenditure in excess of $20 million.'

Dorothy was active in other ways, apart from CENEF, for examples she was president of the Girls Friendly Society, and the Mother's Union She received an OBE on 2/1/1956, 'for services to many Church movements in the Commonwealth of Australia'

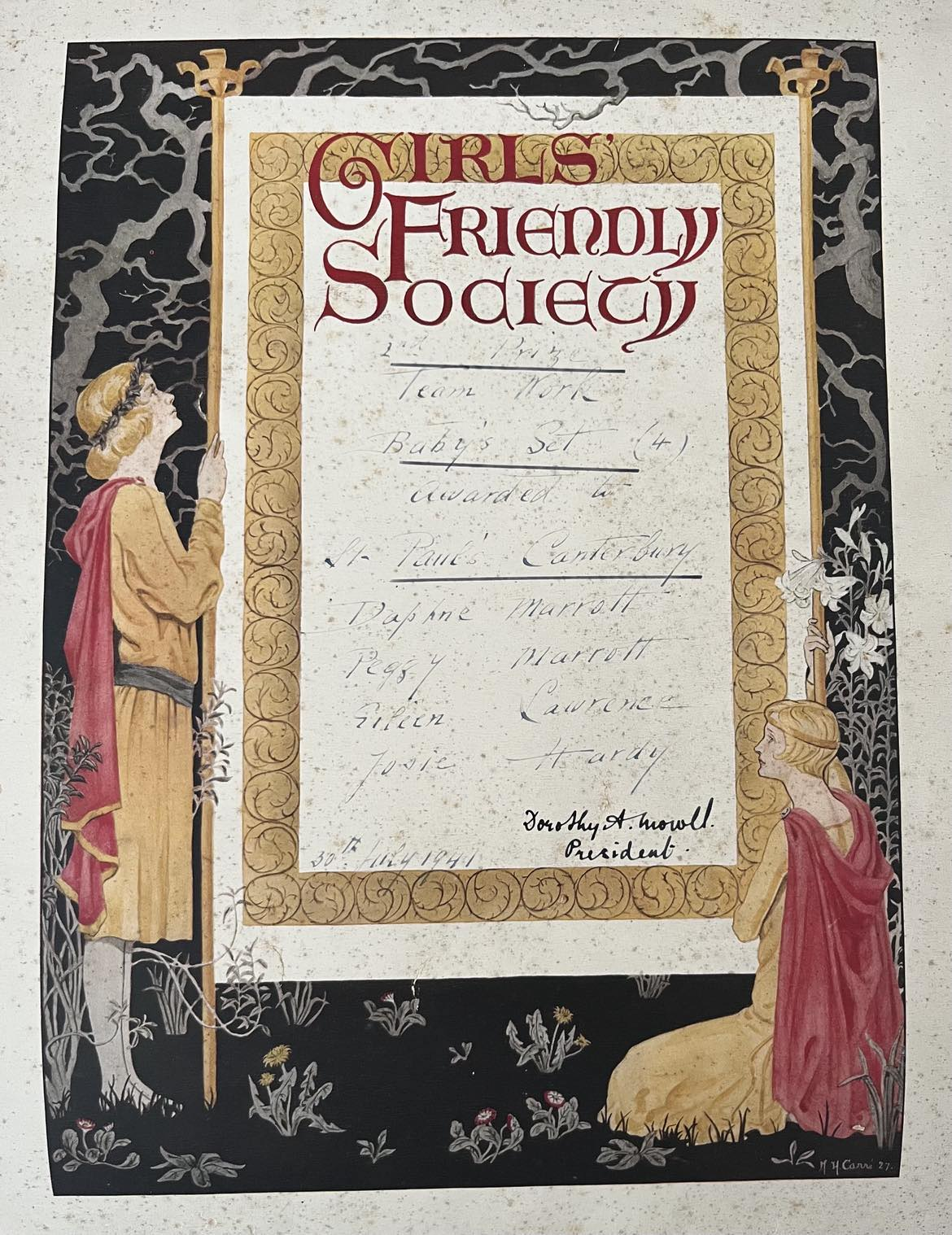
Girls Friendly Society certificate for team work making a Baby Set from 1941
