= Joseph Farrall Wright =

Joseph Farrall Wright (1827–1883) was a 19th-century Anglican priest who founded the historic English football club Bolton Wanderers.

Wright was educated at St Bees Theological College and ordained in 1852. After serving at Bolton-le-Moors he came to Christ Church in Bolton in 1871. In 1874 he founded a football club with a teacher, Thomas Ogden, from his church school for ex pupils which in 1877 became Bolton Wanderers. He was its first president.

He died in June 1883: his only son was John Wright, Archbishop of Sydney from 1909 until 1933.
