= Bishop of Marlborough =

Anglican suffragan bishop in England

The Bishop of Marlborough was an episcopal title used by a Church of England suffragan bishop, firstly in the 16th century for the Diocese of Salisbury, and secondly in the late 19th and early 20th century for the Diocese of London.

The title takes its name after the town of Marlborough, Wiltshire and was first created under the Suffragan Bishops Act 1534. After the 1560s, the title fell into abeyance until it was revived in 1888, at the suggestion of the then Bishop of London, to assist in the running of the rapidly expanding Diocese of London.

== List of bishops of Marlborough ==
Bishops of Marlborough
From	Until	Incumbent	Notes
1537	? 1561	Thomas Morley	Also recorded as Thomas Calne and Thomas Bickley. Formerly Abbot of Stanley; consecrated on 4 November 1537; possibly died in 1561;
fl. 1560s		Thomas Lancaster	Formerly Bishop of Kildare; acted as suffragan bishop of Marlborough in the 1560s; later became Archbishop of Armagh in 1568.
unknown	1888	in abeyance	
1888	1918	Alfred Earle	He was simultaneously Rector of St Botolph's, Bishopsgate; c. 1897–1900, he was assisted by Alfred Barry, Rector of St James's, Piccadilly; Earle retained the See of Marlborough after he was appointed Dean of Exeter in 1900, while Barry took on Marlborough's former care of West London (the rural deaneries of Westminster, Hampton, and Uxbridge, which in 1903 were given over to the Bishop of Kensington)
1919	present	in abeyance; effectively succeeded as suffragan for West London by the Bishops of Kensington	
