= Alfred Barry =

Australian bishop

The Right Reverend Alfred Barry
- Bishop of Sydney
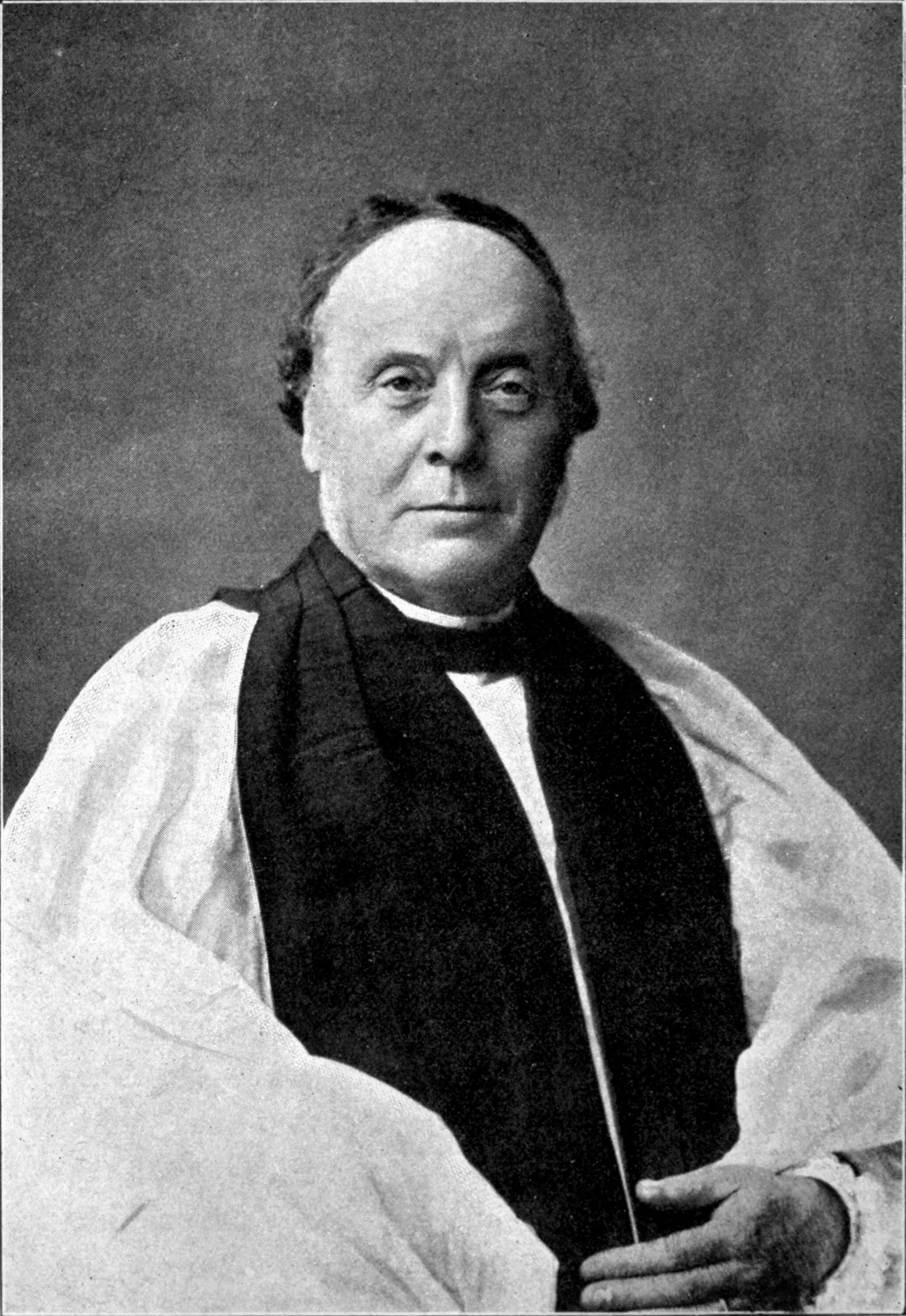
- Barry, c. 1890, by Elliott & Fry
- Church: Church of England
- Diocese: Sydney
- In office: 1884–1889
- Predecessor: Frederic Barker
- Successor: Saumarez Smith
- Other posts: Primate of Australia (ex officio); Assistant Bishop of Rochester; Canon of Windsor; Rector of St James's, Piccadilly; Assistant Bishop of London

Orders
- Ordination: 1850 (as deacon) by Thomas Turton; 1853 (as priest) by Samuel Wilberforce
- Consecration: 1 January 1884 by Edward White Benson

Personal details
- Born: 15 January 1826 Ely Place, Holborn, London
- Died: 1 April 1910 (aged 84) Windsor
- Buried: Worcester Cathedral
- Denomination: Anglican
- Parents: Sir Charles Barry; Sarah Rowsell
- Spouse: Louisa Victoria Hughes (m. 1851)
- Children: 4
- Education: King's College School; Trinity College, Cambridge
- Coat of arms: Alfred Barry's coat of arms

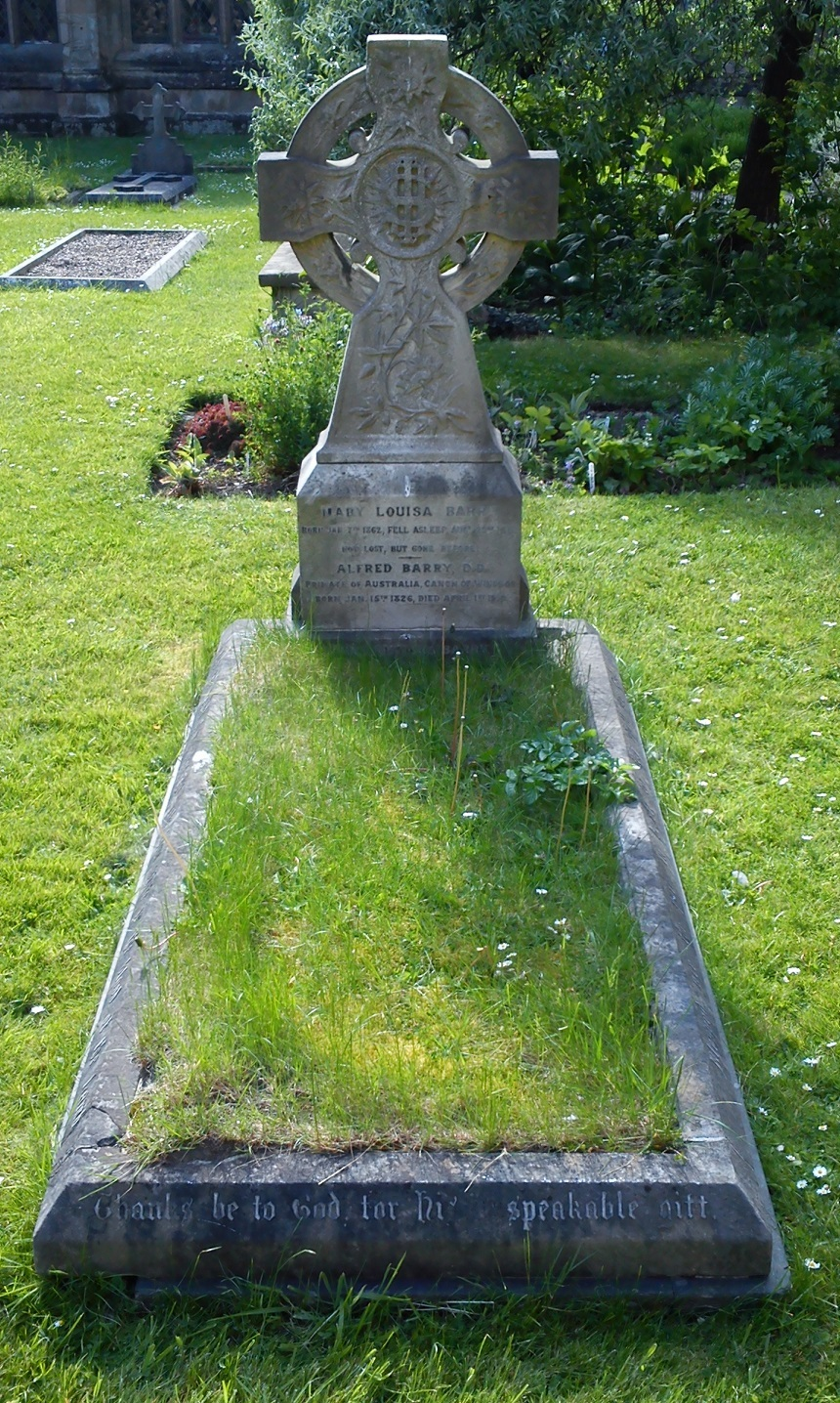
Barry's grave in the Worcester Cathedral cloisters

Alfred Barry (15 January 1826 – 1 April 1910) was the third Bishop of Sydney serving 1884–1889. Over the course of his career, Barry served as headmaster of independent schools, Principal of King's College London university and founded Anglican schools such as Shore School. He officiated at the funeral of Charles Darwin in 1882.

== Life ==
He was born in Ely Place, Holborn in London, the son of the eminent architect, Sir Charles Barry and Sarah Rowsell, and had four brothers; Charles Barry (junior), Edward Middleton Barry, John Wolfe-Barry and Godfrey Barry.

From King's College School, he went to Trinity College, Cambridge (B.A., 1848; M.A., 1851), where his performance as 4th Wrangler (aeq.) and 7th Classic won him a minor fellowship and a Smith's prize. In 1850 he became a major fellow and was made deacon in the Church of England by Bishop Thomas Turton of Ely; Bishop Wilberforce of Oxford ordained him priest in 1853. He continued with divinity studies (B.D., 1860; D.D., 1866). Oxford gave him an honorary DCL in 1870, as did Durham in 1888.

He was consecrated in Westminster Abbey on 1 January 1884 by the Archbishop of Canterbury, assisted by the Bishops of London, Durham, Lincoln, Rochester, Dover and Bishop Perry. On 24 April, he was enthroned in St. Andrew's Cathedral, Sydney, installed as Bishop of Sydney and recognised as metropolitan of New South Wales and Primate of Australia and Tasmania.

Barry returned to England in 1889 and was appointed an Assistant Bishop of Rochester. In 1891 he was appointed Canon of the eleventh stall at St George's Chapel, Windsor Castle, a position he held until 1910. He was installed there on 13 January 1891; and in October–December 1891 he provided cover for Edward Bickersteth (Bishop of Exeter) while the latter was away in Japan.

Remaining a Canon of Windsor, he was also appointed Rector of St James's, Piccadilly, in 1895 (taking up the post after Michaelmas) and beginning to give episcopal assistance to the Bishop of London; he was (additionally) commissioned an Assistant Bishop of London in April 1897, which general commission he retained until his death.

Alfred Earle, suffragan Bishop of Marlborough, was often in ill-health during this period, and Barry (whose parish was within Marlborough's area) frequently deputised for him; when Earle resigned his responsibilities for West London in June 1900, Barry took these up (but not the See of Marlborough). Barry himself then resigned those responsibilities (for the rural deaneries of Westminster, Hampton, and Uxbridge) on medical advice in February 1903 and retired to the cloisters at Windsor Castle. He died at Windsor and his body lies in the cloisters of Worcester Cathedral. He was survived by his wife Louisa Victoria, daughter of Canon Hughes of Peterborough, whom he had married on 13 August 1851, and by two sons and a daughter. Another daughter, Mary Louisa (1862–1880) died young and was buried beneath the cloisters of his burial place.

== Brief history ==
- Sub-warden of Trinity College, Glenalmond, from 1849 to 1854.
- Headmaster of Leeds Grammar School from 1854 to 1862.
- Headmaster of Cheltenham College from 1862 to 1868.
- Principal of King's College, London, from 1868 to 1883.
- Member of the Metaphysical Society.
- Residentiary canon of Worcester in 1871, and of Westminster in 1881.
- Honorary chaplain to the Queen in 1875.
- third Bishop of Sydney 1884–1889.
- Founded St Andrew's Cathedral School, Sydney, 1885. The Bishop Barry Centre (BBC) was opened in July 1991 in Druitt St, Sydney and dedicated to his contributions in founding the school.
- Founded Sydney Church of England Grammar School, Sydney, 1889.
- Assistant bishop in the Diocese of Rochester, 1889 to 1891.
- Canon of Windsor 1891 to death.
- Rector of St James, Piccadilly, 1895 to 1900.
- Assistant bishop in West London from 1897 to death:
  - deputising in West London for the Bishop of Marlborough, 1897–1900
  - responsible for West London, 1900–1903

== Sermons & other writings ==
- Lectures on Christianity and Socialism (London, 1890)
- He had written a well-informed biography of his father in 1867 and defended his designs for the Palace of Westminster against the supporters of Augustus Welby Pugin in 1868.
- In 1881 he edited the architectural lectures of his eldest brother, Edward Middleton.
- As late as 1908 he published four lectures for St George's Chapel entitled Do we Believe?
- Published Introduction to the Old Testament, Notes on the Gospels; Notes on the Catechism; The Teacher's Prayer Book as well as various volumes of Sermons. Contributed to Smith's Dictionary of the Bible.

Academic offices
Preceded by Richard William Jelf	Principal of King's College London; 1868–1883	Succeeded by Henry Wace
Anglican Communion titles
Preceded by Frederic Barker	Bishop of Sydney; 1884 to 1889	Succeeded by Saumarez Smith as Archbishop of Sydney
Preceded by Frederic Barker	Primate of the Church of England in Australia and Tasmania; 1884 to 1889	Succeeded by Saumarez Smith
