= Anglican Retirement Villages, Diocese of Sydney =

Not-for-profit public benevolent institution

Anglican Retirement Villages, Diocese of Sydney (ARV) was a not-for-profit public benevolent institution formed in 1959. This inception date places ARV as one of the founding entities of the social service now referred to as retirement or seniors living. ARV retained its distinctive Christian and social credentials, and served some 6000 people across community care, independent living and assisted living services. ARV merged with Anglicare Sydney in 2016.

== History ==
Archbishop Howard Mowll and his wife Dorothy Mowll were instrumental in the cause to provide housing and food for missionaries returning from the overseas mission field who had neither family nor finance to support them in their retirement.

== Structure ==
The organisation is owned and operated by the Anglican Diocese of Sydney, with which ARV retained strong ties, including a common mission and a central focus on evangelism. The board of Anglican Retirement Villages was appointed by the Archbishop of Sydney and the synod.

== Current profile ==
ARV's vision was "Reaching out, enriching lives and sharing the love of Jesus." Services were provided across Sydney in:

- Community care: including federal and state funded community programs, ARV funded programs and user pays funded programs.
- Independent living: provision of a number of managed, secure communities for seniors to age in place in, within a supported environment to ensure that wherever possible, further moves to more intensive accommodation is avoided.
- Residential care: this focuses on a number of key care needs including dementia, palliative care, rehabilitation and psycho-geriatric care.

Underpinning all care services ARV developed close working relationships with local Anglican parishes to ensure appropriate chaplaincy and Christian ministry services are visible and accessible throughout the organisation.
