= Emma Crawford =

British nun (1864–1939)

Saint Emma Crawford

Mother Superior of the Sisters of the Sacred Advent
- Born: c. December 1858; Saint Martin-in-the-Fields, Middlesex, United Kingdom of Great Britain and Ireland
- Died: 9 March 1939; Brisbane, Queensland, Dominion of Australia
- Resting place: Lutwyche Cemetery
- Honored in: Anglican Communion

Emma Crawford (c. December 1858 – 9 March 1939) was a teacher and mother superior of the Sisters of the Sacred Advent in Queensland, Australia.

== Early life ==
She was born to Lt. William Crawford, the adjutant of the coastal artillery brigade, and his wife Sarah Grace (née Gregg) with her birth being registered in the December quarter 1858 in St Martins in the Field, Middlesex, England (now part of London). She was well-educated and may have had teaching experience.

== Religious life ==
She moved to Queensland, Australia, and shortly thereafter, in September 1896, was admitted into the Anglican Society of the Sacred Advent. The founder of the order, Sister Caroline, who had worked with the poor and neglected in England before moving to Australia, continued her work there in Brisbane. The order had only recently accepted an offer from Bishop William Thomas Thornhill Webber to manage an orphanage and a "rescue" home for women and infants there.

The State Education Act of 1875 prohibited any form of religious instruction in the government-funded schools of Queensland. To meet the demand for religious education, Bishop Webber asked the sisters to open a primary day school for the children of the area and to also manage the Eton High School for girls. Sister Emma was made the sister-in-charge of the latter school, and through her effort proved the viability of Anglican girl's schools in Queensland. Her influence in her order increased when the mother superior of the order, now Mother Caroline, left for England to find financial help and new members of the community. In 1905, Emma became the mother superior of the order. The community developed a school for troubled girls in Brisbane, and later took over a school in Stanhope, which was later moved to Warwick and renamed St. Catharine's.

During World War I, Mother Emma accepted an offer from Bishop John Oliver Feetham to establish boarding schools for girls in his diocese. The order established St. Anne's school in Townsville, which opened in July 1917; St. Mary's school in Herberton in 1918, St. Gabriel's school in Charters Towers in 1921. After the war ended, the order also acquired a hostel in Charleville, for children attending the local state school who needed a place to live, and in 1929 Mother Emma accepted the responsibility of managing the St. Martin's War Memorial Hospital in Brisbane. In 1929, she began her last major venture in Brisbane, establishing St. Aidan's School at Corinda in February.

In 1932, she accepted the offer of the Anglican Diocese of Rockhampton to relocate there, and began to manage St. Faith's School in Yeppoon.

== Later life ==
Mother Emma died from cancer on 9 March 1939. Her funeral service was held on 10 March 1939 at the Society's community house adjacent to St Margaret's Anglican Girls' School in Brisbane after which she was buried in Brisbane's Lutwyche Cemetery. A requiem was held for her at St John's Cathedral in Brisbane on 11 March 1939.

== Legacy ==
During her life, Mother Emma had established her community in three of the five Anglican dioceses of Queensland. Her schools, which were based on the model of English schools, maintained high and strict academic standards, and insisted on using only well trained teachers and staff. Her order never had more than thirty professed sisters, causing her to lament in 1906 that "responses to the call of the life of a sister are still very rare in Australia."

Bishop Feetham described her as "the principal benefactress of this diocese" on her death, for her work with the order and her efforts to moderate the rising tide of materialism and secularism in the area.

She is commemorated in the Calendar of saints of the Anglican Church of Australia on 9 March.
