= Saumarez Smith =

Australian bishop

The Most Reverend Saumarez Smith
- Bishop and Archbishop of Sydney
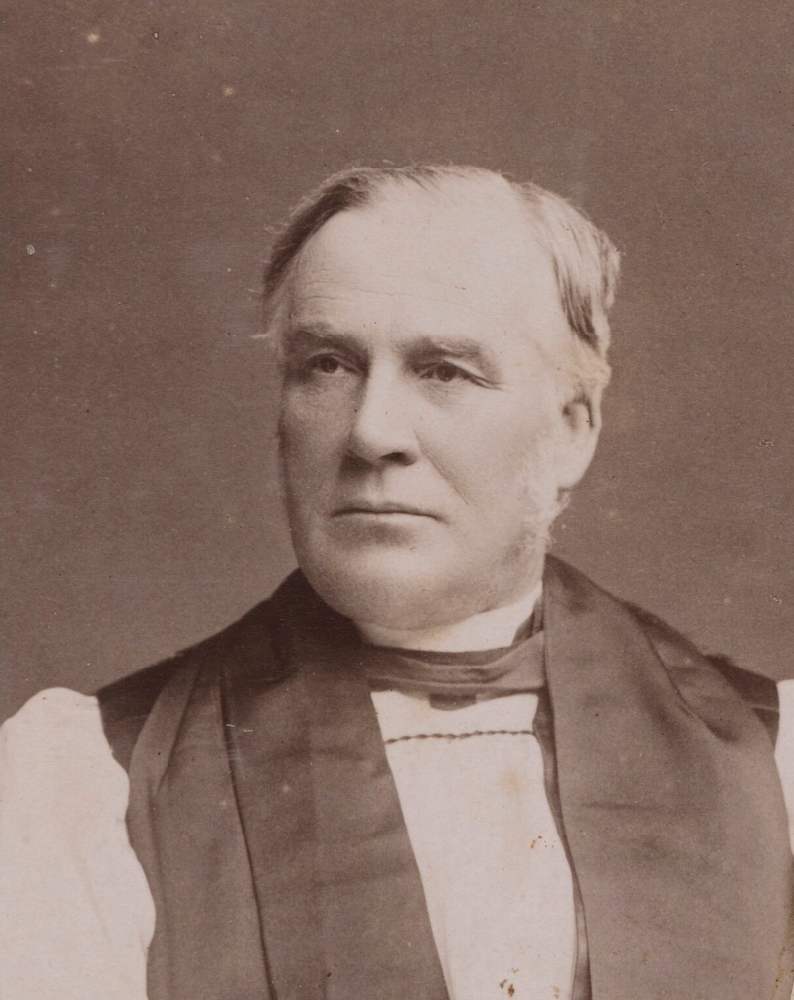
- Smith, c. 1897
- Church: Church of England
- Province: New South Wales
- Diocese: Sydney
- In office: 1890–1897 (as Bishop); 1897–1909 (as Archbishop)
- Predecessor: Alfred Barry
- Successor: John Wright
- Other post: Primate of Australia (ex officio)
- Previous posts: Vicar of Trumpington; (1867–1869); Principal of St Aidan's Theological College; (1869–1890)

Orders
- Ordination: 19 June 1859 (as deacon); 3 Jun 1860 (as priest)
- Consecration: 24 June 1890

Personal details
- Born: William Saumarez Smith; 14 January 1836 Saint Helier, Jersey
- Died: 18 April 1909 (aged 73) Sydney
- Denomination: Anglican
- Parents: Richard Snowden Smith; Anne, née Robin
- Spouse: Florence Deedes (m. 1870)
- Children: 8
- Education: Windlesham House School; Marlborough College
- Alma mater: Trinity College, Cambridge
- Coat of arms

William Saumarez Smith (known as Saumarez; 14 January 1836 – 18 April 1909) was an Anglican Archbishop of Sydney, Australia.
