= Henry Earle =

English surgeon (1789–1838)

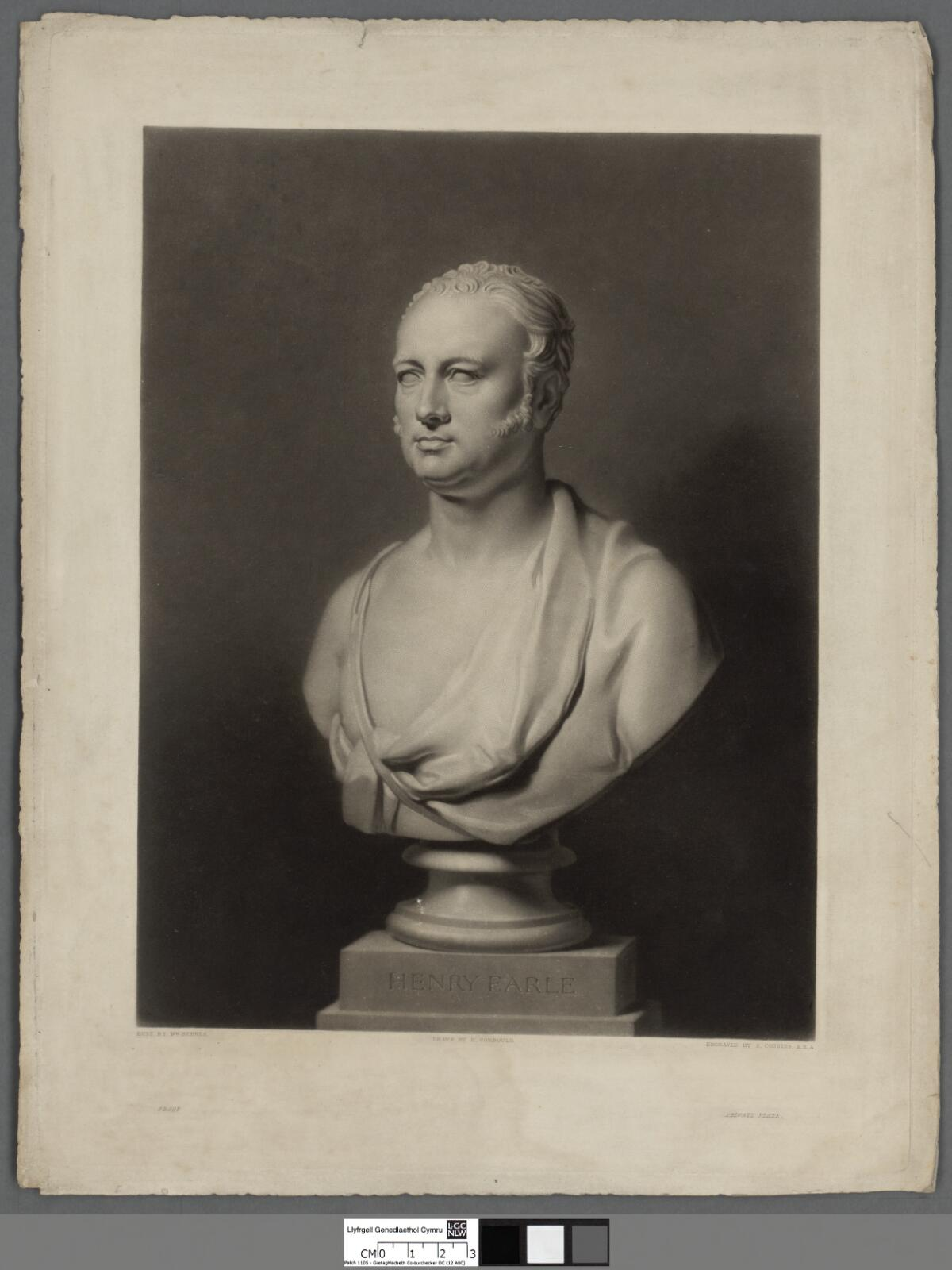
Portrait of Henry Earle

Henry Earle (1789–1838) was an English surgeon.

== Biography ==
Earle was the third son of Sir James Earle, was born 28 June 1789, in Hanover Square, London. His mother was daughter of Percival Pott, the great surgeon. He was apprenticed to his father at the age of sixteen, became a member of the College of Surgeons in 1808, and was then appointed house surgeon at St. Bartholomew's Hospital. In 1811 he began practice as a surgeon, and attained some notoriety by the invention of a bed for cases of fracture of the legs. For this invention he received two prizes from the Society of Arts.

In 1813 he obtained the Jacksonian prize at the College of Surgeons for an essay on the diseases and injuries of nerves. He was elected assistant-surgeon to St. Bartholomew's Hospital in 1815, and on the resignation of Abernethy was elected surgeon to the hospital, 29 August 1827. He became surgeon to the Foundling Hospital, where a bust of him, by William Behnes, was placed in 1817. He was elected in 1822 a fellow of the Royal Society.

In 1833 he was made professor of anatomy and surgery at the Royal College of Surgeons, and in 1835–7 he was president of the Royal Medical and Chirurgical Society. On the accession of Queen Victoria he was appointed surgeon extraordinary to her majesty.

He lived in George Street, Hanover Square, London, attained considerable practice, and died of fever at his own house 18 January 1838. His son was Alfred Earle, Bishop of Marlborough.

== Publications ==
Besides twelve surgical papers in the Medico-Chirurgical Transactions and two on surgical subjects in the Philosophical Transactions (1821 and 1822). He also published Practical Observations in Surgery in London in 1823. The frontispiece of this book has a series of drawings of the bed invented by Earle, and one of the six essays which make up the volume is a description of this bed. Two are reprints of his papers in the Philosophical Transactions on an injury to the urethra and on the mechanism of the spine; the others are on injuries near the shoulder, on fracture of the funny-bone, and on certain fractures of the thigh-bone. This essay led to a controversy with Sir Astley Cooper as to whether fracture of the neck of the thighbone ever unites. Cooper maintained that it does not unite, and said that Earle only maintained the contrary in order to depreciate Guy's Hospital and its teaching. Earle defended his views in 'Remarks on Sir Astley Cooper's Reply,’ printed 13 September 1823.

In 1832 he published Two Lectures on the Primary and Secondary Treatment of Burns. His writings show him to have been a surgeon of large experience, but without much scientific acuteness. He was of small stature, and hence The Lancet, in many indecent attacks on him, usually calls him 'the cock-sparrow,’ but in a long series of abusive paragraphs nothing to Earle's real discredit is stated. His distinguished surgical descent, his early opportunities of acquiring knowledge, and success in obtaining important appointments seem to have made him somewhat arrogant, but he undoubtedly worked hard at his profession, and deserved the trust which a large circle of friends and patients placed in him.
