= St Philip's Church, Sydney =

St Philip's Church
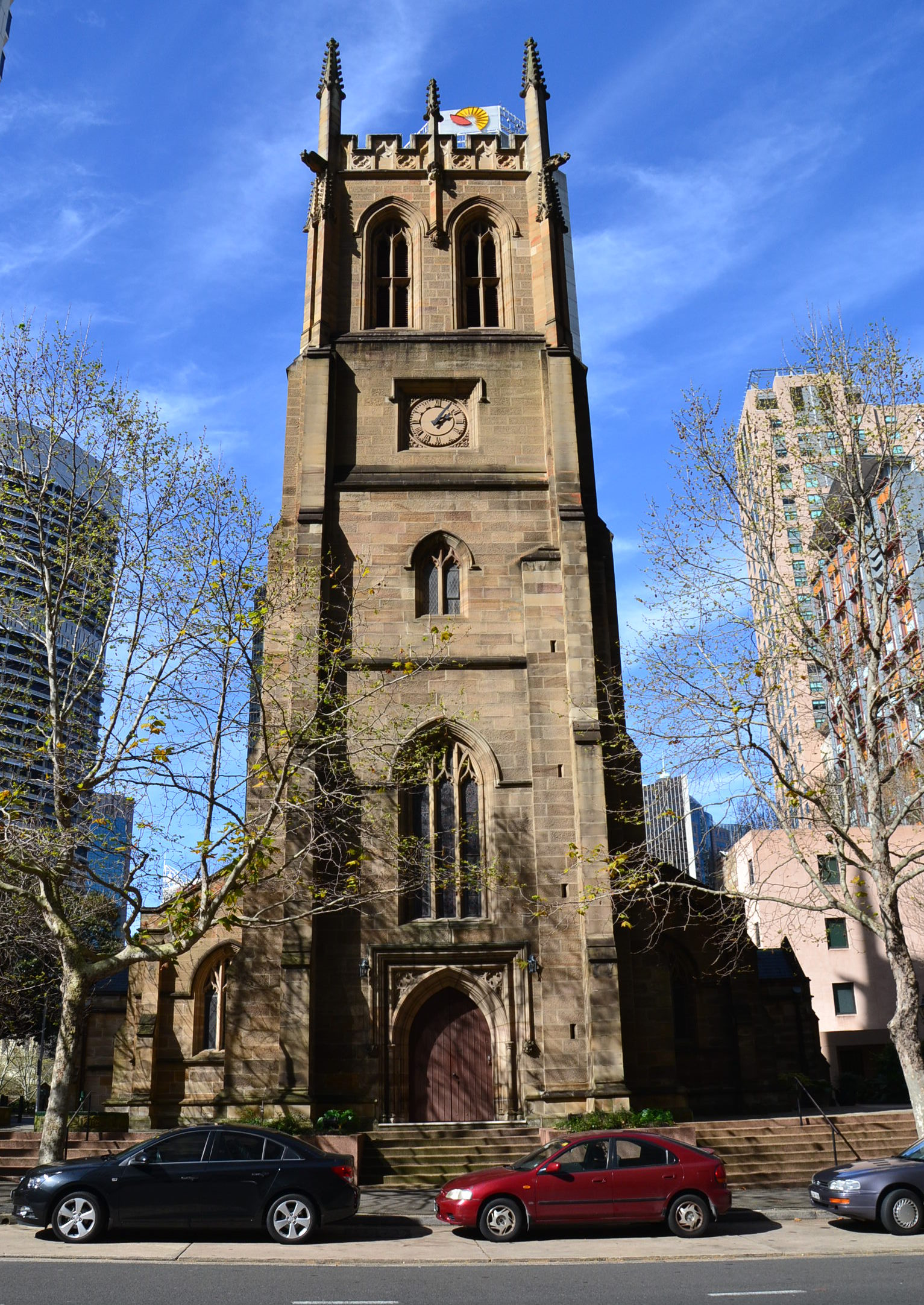

- Location in Greater Sydney
- Location: 3 York Street, Sydney CBD, New South Wales
- Country: Australia
- Denomination: Anglican Church of Australia
- Churchmanship: Low Church
- Website: churchhillanglican.com

History
- Status: Church
- Dedication: Philip the Apostle in honour of Captain Arthur Phillip, RN

Architecture
- Functional status: Active
- Architect: Edmund Blacket
- Architectural type: Victorian Academic Gothic with English Perpendicular detail
- Years built: 1848-1858

Specifications
- Materials: Sandstone, slate roofing, timber flooring, trusses and stairs, ceramic tiles

Administration
- Diocese: Sydney
- Parish: Church Hill Anglican

Clergy
- Rector: Rev. Justin Moffatt

New South Wales Heritage Database (Local Government Register)
- Official name: St Philip's Church of England Including Interior and Grounds
- Type: Local government heritage (built)
- Criteria: a., c., d., f., g.
- Delisted: 14 December 2012
- Reference no.: I1972
- Category: Church
- Type: Religion
- Builder: Unknown

St Philip's Church, Sydney, is the oldest Anglican church parish in Australia. The church is located in the Sydney city centre between York Street, Clarence and Jamison Streets on a location known as Church Hill. It is one of two churches in the Anglican Parish of Church Hill (the other being Holy Trinity, Miller's Point). Together, they are known as Church Hill Anglican. St Philip's is part of the Diocese of Sydney, Australia. The church is listed on the (now defunct) Register of the National Estate.

== History ==
The original church was built using convict labour by orders of the colony's first chaplain, the Reverend Richard Johnson, in June 1793. The wattle and daub construction church was burnt down by convicts in 1798. A second, stone, church operated on the current site of Lang Park, Church Hill, from 1810 to 1856. It was made from poor materials and gained a reputation as "the ugliest church in Christendom". This second church had a 150-feet high, round clock tower.

The original parish was named St Phillip's Church in honour of the first Colonial Governor, Captain Arthur Phillip, RN. but from around 1840 the spelling "St Philip's" predominated, and was mandated in 1848 with commencement of the new building.

The current building on York Street is the second church building on Church Hill (the wattle and daub church was built on the corner of Bligh and Hunter Streets), and was designed by Edmund Blacket in the Victorian Gothic style with English Perpendicular detail. It was built 1848–56. The church tower was styled after Magdalen Tower at Oxford, United Kingdom, and was opened in 1856.

The bells were cast by Charles and George Mears at the Whitechapel Bell Foundry in East London in 1858.

During World War II the hall was used as a hostel for women officers, who were on leave in Sydney. This was in partnership with the Church of England National Emergency Fund

== Parish ==
On 1 November 2013 St Philip's merged with Holy Trinity Millers Point, also known as the Garrison Church to form the joint parish of Church Hill, using both buildings for combined ministry.

== Clergy ==
Prominent clergy in the life of the church include William Cowper, his son William Cowper (the first Australian-born cleric), T. C. Hammond, Sydney James Kirkby and a former Archbishop of Sydney, Donald Robinson.

The church is part of the Parish of Church Hill, and so is called Church Hill Anglican (together with The Garrison Church) and the current rector is Justin Moffatt, who was previously at Christ Church, New York City.

== Gallery ==
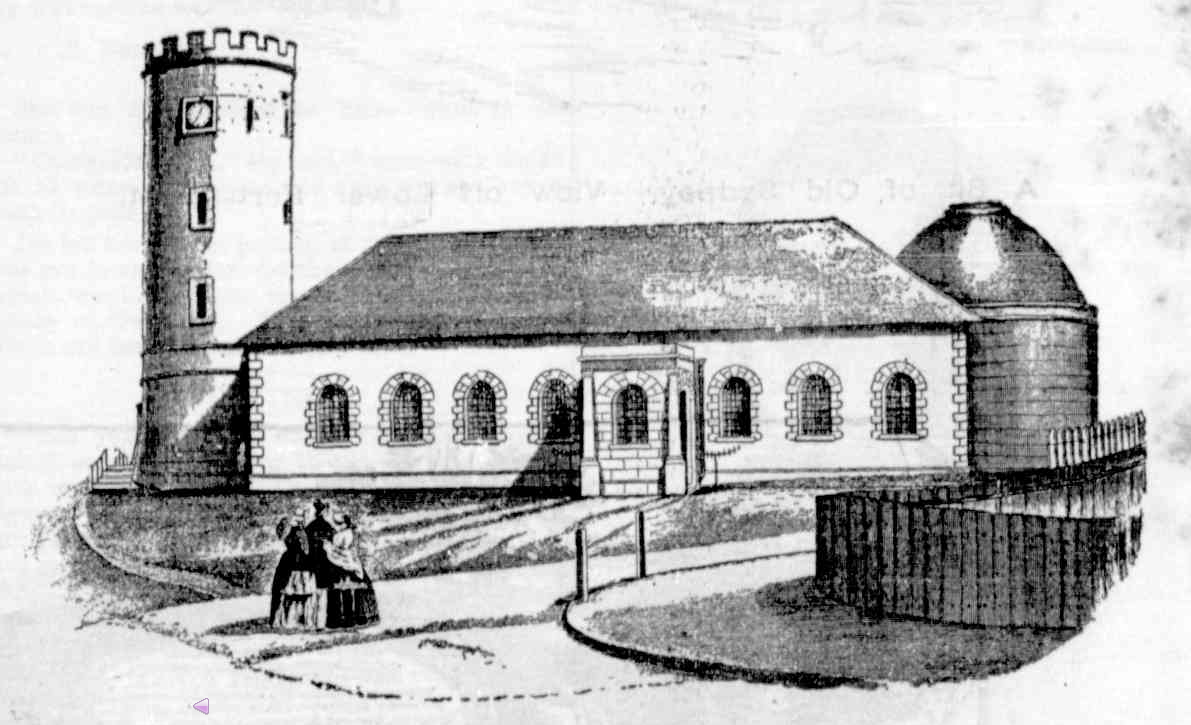
A sketch of the 2nd Church

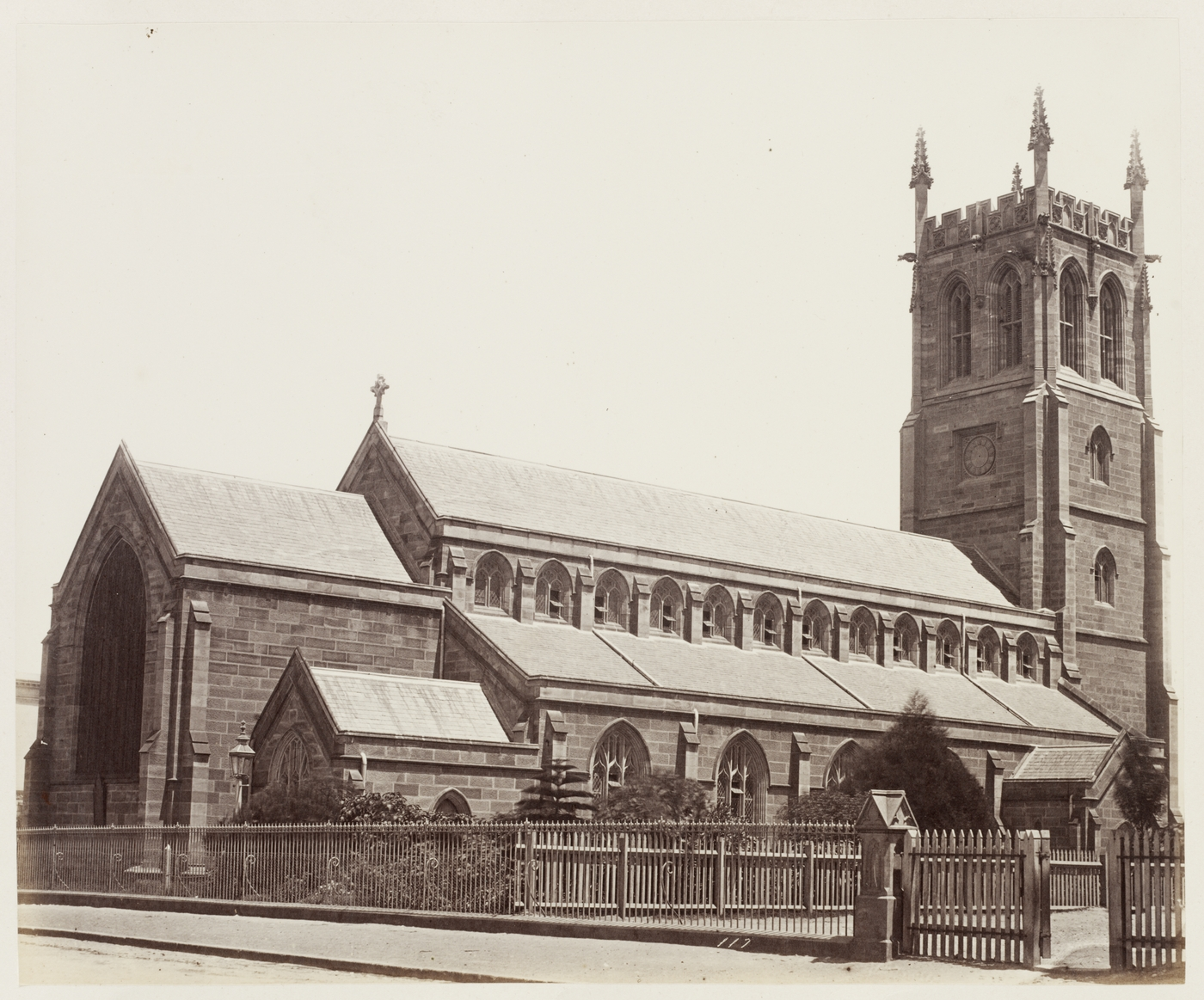
St Philip's in 1872

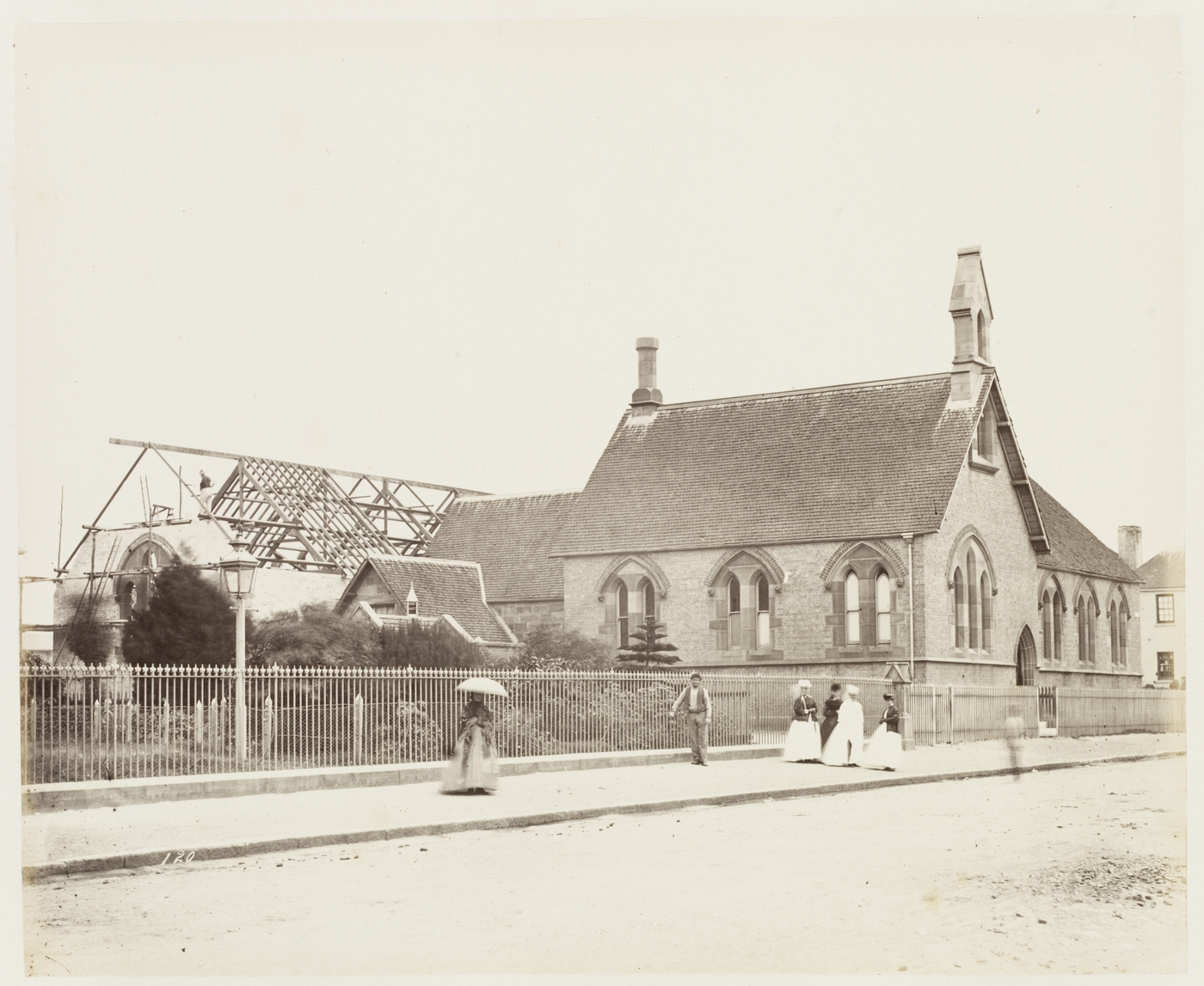
St Philip's School in 1872

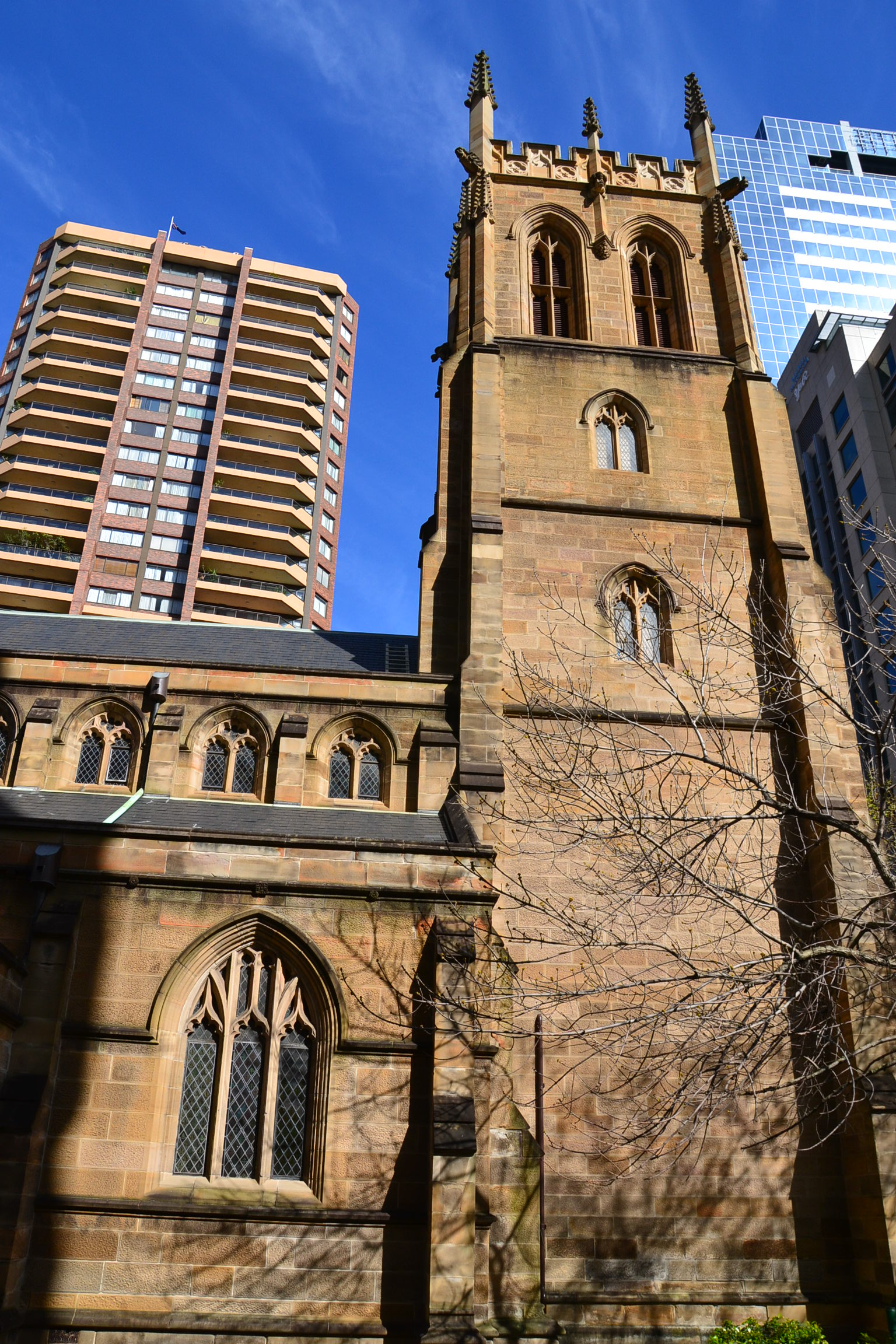

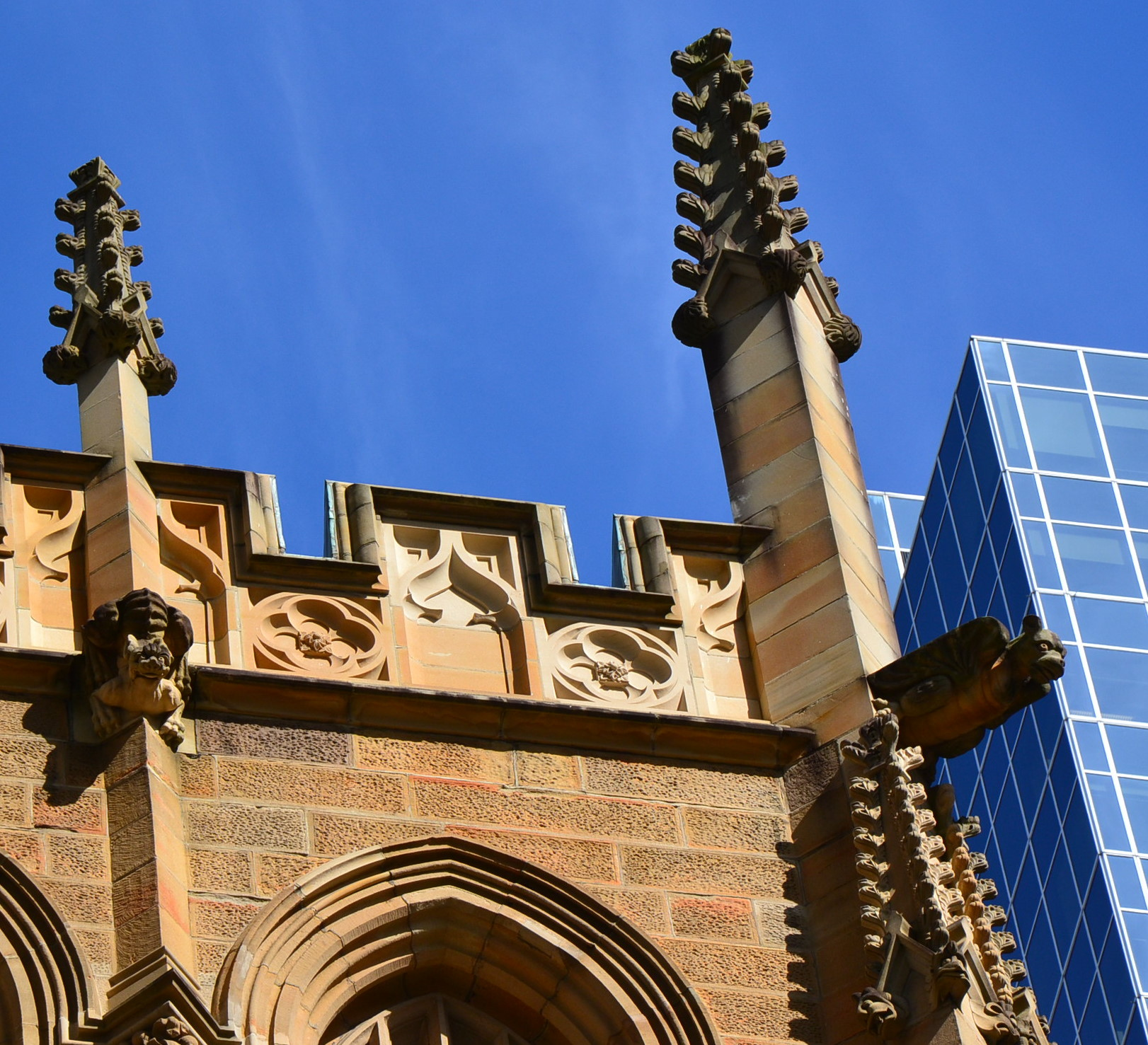

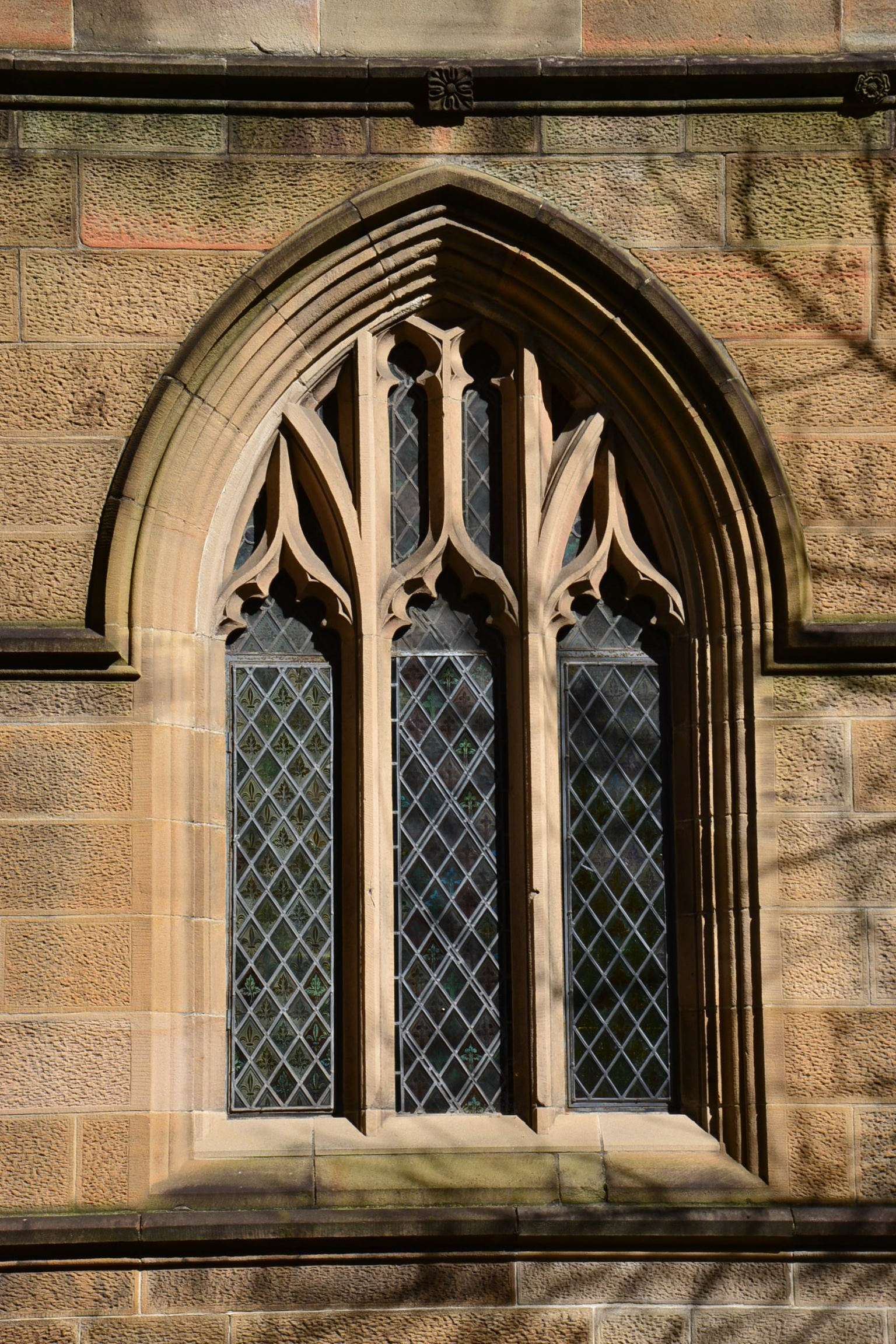

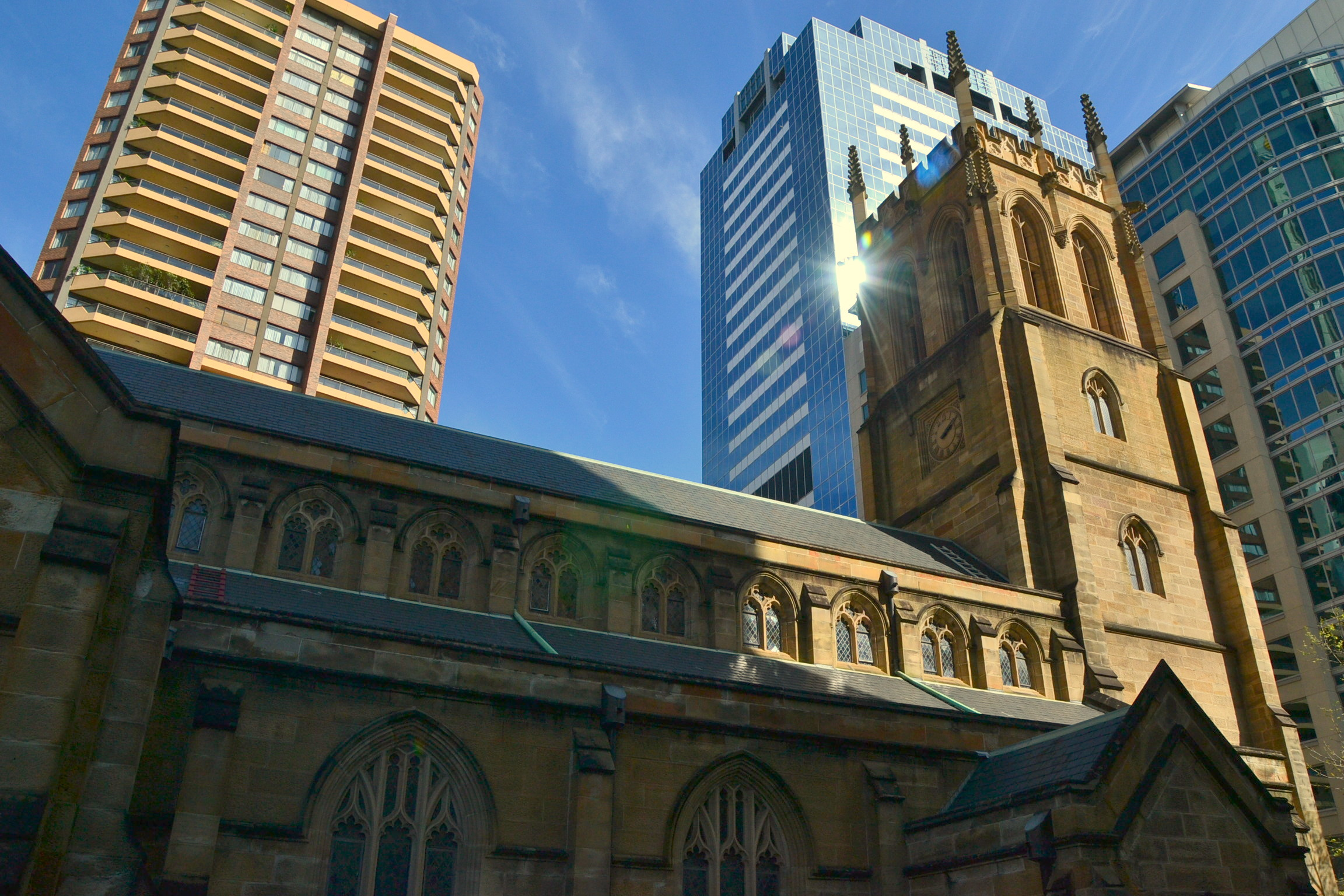

== See also ==
- Australian non-residential architectural styles
- List of Anglican churches in the Diocese of Sydney
