= Church of England National Emergency Fund =

Anglican, voluntary organisation, World War 2

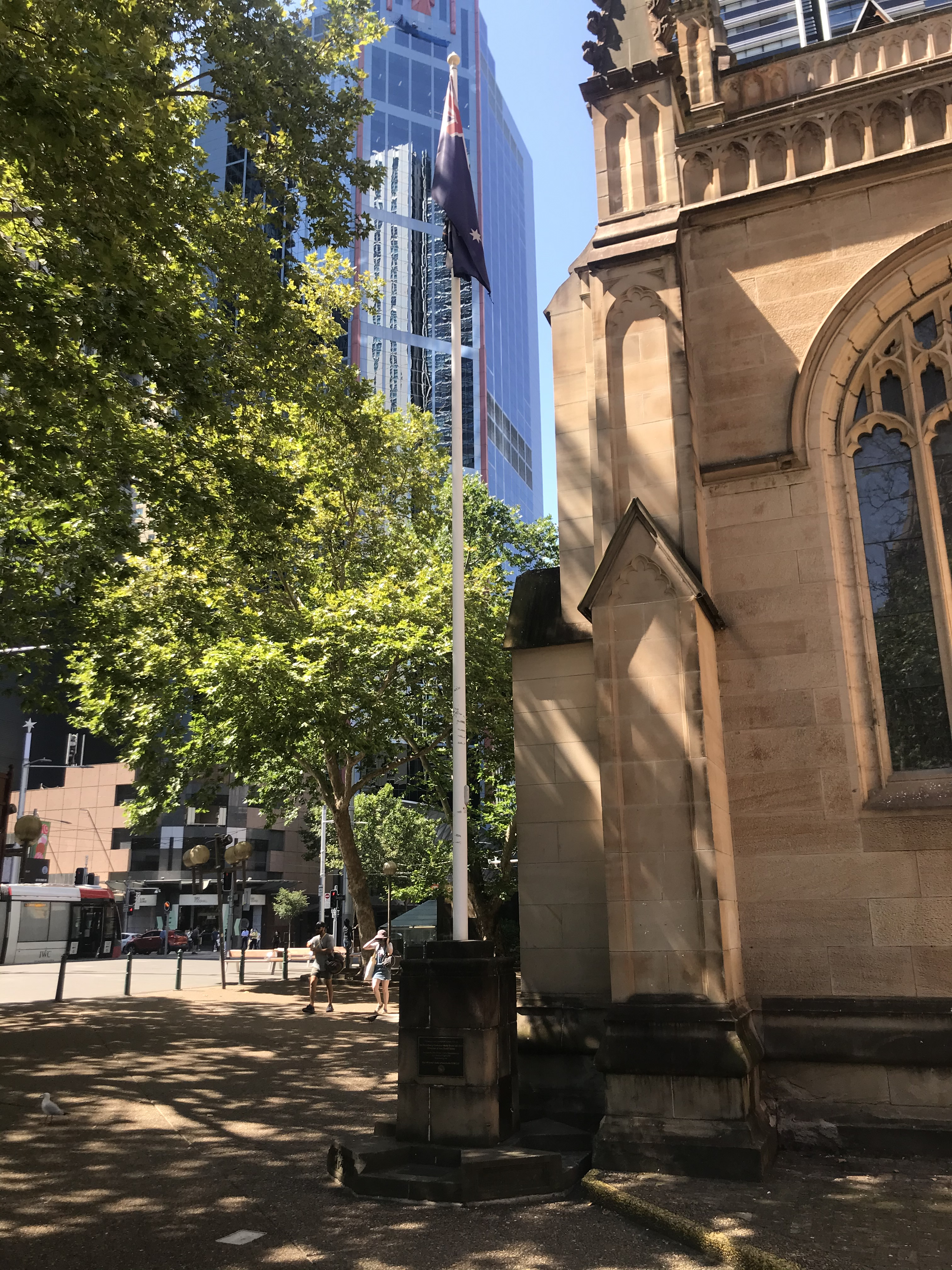
- CENEF flagpole
- Founder: Church of England, Australia

The Church of England National Emergency Fund, known as CENEF, was a volunteer organisation within the Anglican Diocese of Sydney, Australia.

Less than three weeks after Australia declared war on 3/9/39, Archbishop Howard Mowll was already announcing that the Diocesan Standing Committee had agreed to raise funds for 'refreshments and reading rooms' in camps, but also in the Cathedral grounds. By the end of October the Cathedral shed was operational, and the performance of this task was put under the Church of England National Emergency Fund. At the same time his wife, Dorothy Mowll, started the Sydney Diocesan Churchwomen's Association (SDCA) to act as an auxiliary to CENEF - to supply volunteers, raise funds and make ‘comforts’. Mrs Mowll was president of both.

Within the first month of war being declared, Archbishop Mowll had set out the principles of CENEF: 'a special fund to provide, among other things, the stipends of military chaplains appointed for camp work and the cost of erecting and maintaining Church of England halls, refreshment and reading rooms at the larger camps, and one within the Cathedral grounds'.

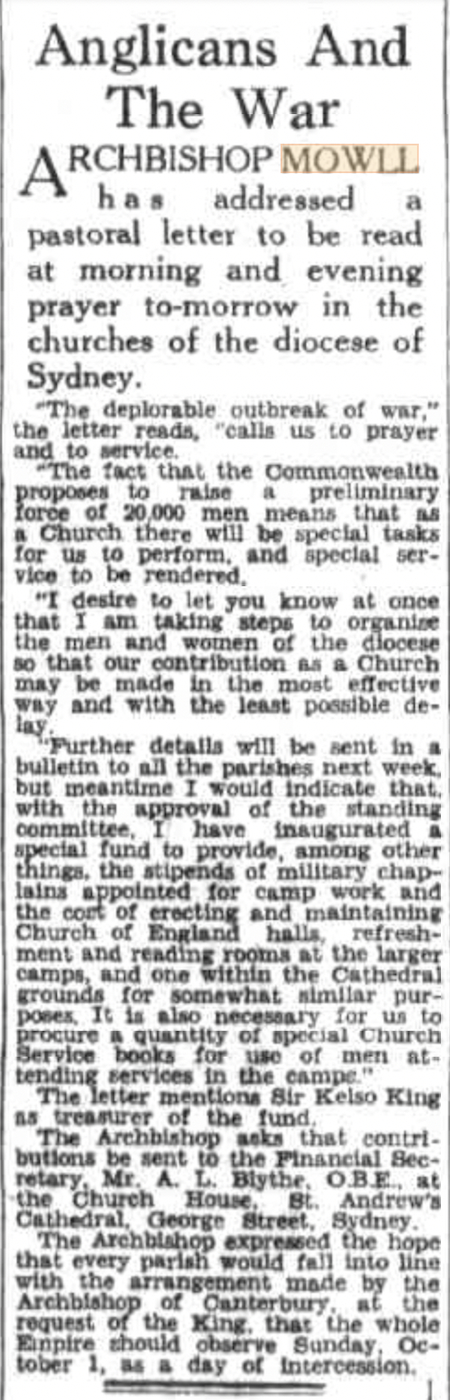
Daily News report 23/9/1939

This story from Manly illustrates the problem. When the congregation came out from the Christmas Day service they found soldiers shaving using the garden taps. They’d received leave, but lived too far from Sydney to go home, and couldn't find accommodation.

Once the problem was recognised multiple groups got involved. By Christmas 1943 there was a total of over 2,000 hostel beds available in Sydney.

== Recreation Huts and Mobile Canteens ==
The following huts developed around Sydney. They were built for recreation, but usually a Chaplain was available.

1. St Andrews Cathedral. The first hut at St Andrews was opened in 1940 The initial hut had a ‘small library, newspapers and periodicals and stationary’

2. King's Cross Woolworth's building. Woolworths offered CENEF the use of their Darlinghurst store. It opened as a CENEF recreation area December 1942. It had a billiards table, lounge, reading and writing room, radio and piano

3. St Peter's Church Hall, Watson's Bay in June 1943, and was sited near the naval base

== Armed Services Chaplains, Huts and ‘Comforts’ ==
Large army and air force bases were set up around Sydney during the war and CENEF put recreation huts at Ingleburn, Wallgrove (now in Blacktown) and Liverpool, then Richmond followed by Narellan and finally Sydney Showground These huts were called Cenef Huts and ‘no soldier has to be told what those letters stand for.’.

At first Chaplains who were stationed at the barracks could ‘live in these Church huts and use them as centres for social relaxation and as Chapels for voluntary worship. When it became impossible for a Chaplain to be allocated to huts, CENEF procured the appointment of welfare officers.’

For each of these huts SDCA volunteers made 'comforts' for the Chaplains to distribute. Comforts included things like socks, pyjamas, vests, scarves, balaclava caps, shirts. They also provided forty pounds annually to each chaplain to distribute as needed. They also would include special requests for things like large teapots. Comforts ran as far as cigarettes on Christmas Day

The comforts were kept in store at St Andrews and “Mondays and tuesdays are the days on which the chaplains descend on the stores, gather up cases of comforts and depart with cars laden.”

They also provided for two recreation huts outside of Sydney. One in Darwin, and one in Port Moresby

== Mobile Canteens ==
CENEF ran two mobile canteens. The first, in Sydney initially delivered to National Emergency Services sites at Balmain, Leichhardt and other districts. It was also part of a plan for a national emergency - in which contingency all Church of England halls would be called into service. The Sydney mobile canteen had an oven capacity of 200-300 pies, and a large stock of food and urns for hot drinks. The second mobile canteen served the South Coast

== Hostels ==
1. St Andrew's huts. Eventually there were four huts and a chapter house hostel at the cathedral. The first was the initial recreation hut, then one for enlisted men, opened in August 1941, then for officers, and finally for junior officers. Provision was made for servicewomen by opening up 25 beds and ‘a club’ in Lower Chapter House. These huts spread around three sides of the cathedral and were the most visible part of CENEF work.

2. St John's Milson's Point, for officers. St John's was also known as St John the Baptist before becoming Church by the Bridge or 'The Bridge Church'

3. St Johns Church Glebe Point

4. St Paul's Church Redfern - now known as Cathedral of the Annunciation of Our Lady. They had 50 beds, 20 volunteers and were open on friday and saturday nights. The cost was 1/- and came with morning tea. By February 1944 they had slept 1,500 men in prev 12 months.

5. St Philip's Church, Sydney, known as St Philip's Church Hill, in their hall for women officers

6. St James' Church, Sydney King St

Honorary mention - as it is not one of the six. St Matthews Manly. This was probably the first Church of England hostel accommodation in Sydney during the war. It was started independently by St Matthews, but linked in to the CENEF supply chain.

== Volunteers ==
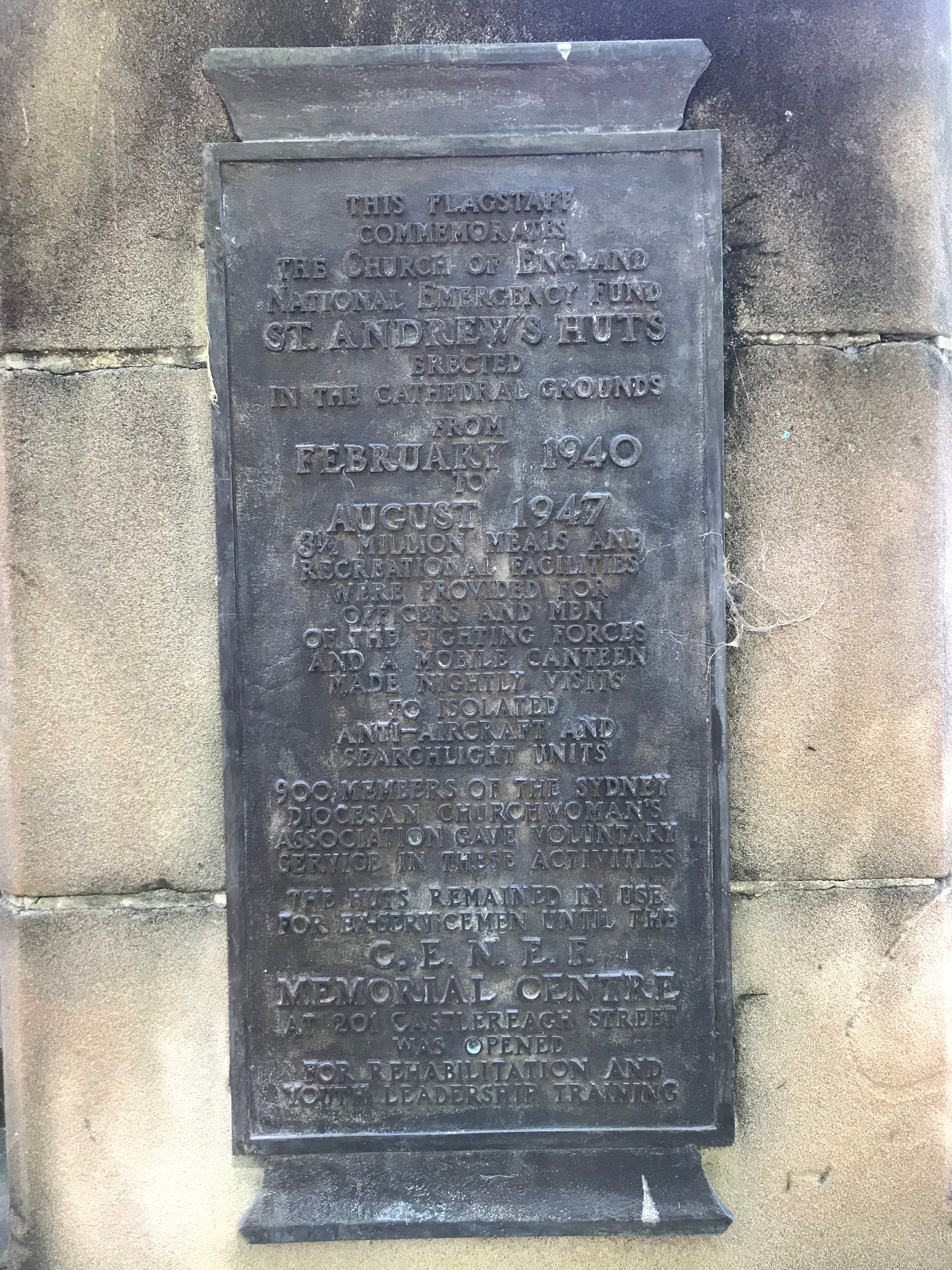
CENEF Memorial Plaque on Flagpole in front of St Andrew's Cathedral Sydney

The bulk of the work of CENEF was done by volunteers from the Sydney Diocesan Churchwomen's Association. At the fourth annual meeting of the SDCA Lady Wakehurst congratulated the 1,700 volunteers who had taken part in activities. This number did not include those who made comforts and fundraised. The flagpole memorial (image) in front of the Cathedral numbers them at only 900. The difference in numbers is that the Cathedral CENEF memorial commemorates only the St Andrews huts, not all of the work of CENEF.

Apart from the SDCA other groups volunteered to help in the CENEF work. The Country Women's Association, the Canadian Women's Association and ‘all’ the Church of England women's organisations are listed in the SMH on. And the Girls Friendly Society.

The volunteers seem to have worked in groups such as ‘the monday group’’. The monday group at the CENEF St Andrew’s site organised a dance at the Coronet.

Volunteering at a site would have been busy. The St Andrew’s canteen used 300 lb of sausages, 90 dozen eggs - as well as joints, cold meats and sweets of all kinds.

The only site with difficulty getting volunteers was Kings Cross , because of a fear of ‘bad people’. This was such a problem that they advertised for ‘Woman, over 45, for kitchen work and general cleaning, full-time, congenial position. C.E.N.E.F. Canteen Woolworths Buildings, Kings Cross’

== Fundraising ==
There was a constant need for fundraising, and apart from church offerings, some of the fundraising methods were:

1. Annual button day. Hundreds of volunteer sellers sold buttons for 2/-, 1/- and 6d, 'with a few higher-priced ones'

2. Plays. Including T.S. Eliot's 'Murder in the Cathedral', put on in the Town Hall

3. A Fish evening - where entry was by a tin of salmon, and 131 were collected.

4. church market days.

5. St John's Concord collected money on Parramatta Road on Friday nights. The 70 members of the group used the money to make comforts.

6. Jumble sale.

7. Beer, sausage and dance night held by the Country Women's Association

== Archbishop and Mrs Mowll ==
In their book “Sydney Anglicans” Stephen Judd and Kenneth Cable note that Archbishop Mowll was a ‘high profile, high energy leader’ with two special interests; the Home Mission Society and Moore Theological College. However, as busy as he was with those interests he and his wife Dorothy were constantly involved in encouraging fundraising in the SDCA and CENEF. Every hut had anniversary occasions, and multiple fundraising events at which one or both often attended.

An example is this, from the Sydney Morning Herald:

“Tribute to “long-suffering husbands” who allowed their wives to spend so much time working for canteens and hostels was paid by Archbishop Mowll at the second anniversary of the C.E.N.E.F. Service-women’s Hostel yesterday. “Speaking as one of them, I think we deserve something,” he added. Mrs Mowll promptly presented the archbishop with the box of flowers committee members had given her as president of the hostel.”

Similarly, Marcus Loane records, in his biography of Archbishop Mowll;

"The Archbishop and Mrs. Mowll together were the mainspring in this tremendous enterprise; they spared neither time nor effort to sustain and increase all that was done. Mrs Mowll would not agree to spend a single week-end out of Sydney during these years, ... She would often take the sheets from the men's hostel and wash them herself when help was wanting"

== High Profile Supporters ==
The Governor Lord Wakehurst opened the first hut in front of St Andrew's Cathedral

Governor-General Lord Gowrie opened the fourth hut at St Andrew's Cathedral - the junior officers’ hut, and the Showground hut.

Rear-Admiral H J Feakes opened the canteen and recreation centre in St Peter's parish hall, Watson's Bay.

Lady Wakehurst opened the club and hostel for women on the lower floor of St Andrew's Chapter House, on the same day her husband opened an extension of the servicemen's hostel. She was also guest of honour at the first birthday of the King's Cross canteen.

Woolworths offered the use of the Woolworths Darlinghurst building for a CENEF canteen.

The Duke and Duchess of Gloucester opened the CENEF Memorial Building at 201 Castlereagh.

Lady Gowrie opened the Women's Officers Club at St Philip's Church Hill, even writing a 'birthday' letter from England after she had left.

== 1945-1947 ==
When the war was over, CENEF began planning for the post war period. Their plans centred around having a permanent location to serve ex service people while demobbing. The idea was to raise 40,000 pounds to have a building that would allow for:

“a. Lounge and club room for discharged servicemen b. Hostels for sleeping accommodation of men still in the Services pending discharge c. Facilities to assist the reabsorption of Service men and women into civilian life. d. A constructive Church approach to the problems of rehabilitation.“

After demobbing was complete the building would house a youth centre.

For this purpose 201 Castlereagh Street was purchased in 1945, but it would not be opened for use until October 1947 The final cost of the building and alterations at Castlereagh Street was 72,000 pounds.

In the intervening two years the Huts at St Andrews remained in use. An example of this was in the following ad: “Wanted. Flat or flatette. 2 business girls, References. ‘Phone after 1. Saturday. Miss J., C.E.N.E.F. Hostel’.

That the huts remained after the War created some criticism in the letters section of The Sydney Morning Herald. Some saw the huts as a ‘disfigurement’. This led R B Robinson, the honorary secretary of CENEF, to write a reply, explaining that the huts were still ‘catering for the needs of serving and returned personnel’. The St Andrew's huts would close for business two months before the CENEF building was opened. During the interim servicemen could get meals each evening at Miller's Point.

There were also enough men staying at CENEF to create a CENEF cricket team in the NSW churches competition. 24/7/56.

== CENEF Memorial Building 201 Castlereagh Street, Sydney and its sale ==
The decision to provide for military personnel after the completion of World War II would leave a significant legacy in Sydney Diocese.

The Castlereagh Street building was owned by the Diocese between 1945 and 1961. During that time it initially served ex military personnel being rehabilitated, and then became a youth hostel. It was also important in the establishment of the Diocesan Youth Department as it provided a base for them to work from, and a space for youth leadership training. Prior to this youth meetings were held in Lower Chapter House sitting on ‘butter boxes’. At the same time as the new Youth Director was holding his meetings in Lower Chapter House it was still a hostel for service women.

It also had a 500-seat auditorium that was used both by the Diocese and rented out. Some of the uses of the auditorium during this period were:

- Establishment of the women’s group of the State Liberal Party.
- Farewelling the NSW members of the Australian Test Team.
- Commercial exhibitions, such as for office machines.
- Public debates.
- 100 Protestant Churchmen met in July 1957 to pledge ‘full support’ for a Billy Graham Crusade in 1959. Archbishop Mowll presided over the meeting. Sydney

However, it was in using the property as capital against loans, and eventually its resale, that the fundraising for the initial building has left a lasting legacy.

- 1947 purchase of Rathane for 4,000 pounds.
- 1955 purchase of 17 acres around Gilbulla for retired church workers
- 1958 purchase of 117 acres at Castle Hill for ‘Mowll Village’ for a church veterans village.

In 1961 201 Castlereagh Street was sold. People using the hostel had to find other lodging, and there was a bit of disagreement over the sale carried on in the Sydney Morning Herald. Two buildings were purchased with the funds:

- 87 Darley St Randwick which was used as a youth hostel.(later sold to buy 29 Arundel St Forest lodge, which is still used for female university student accommodation.
- 511 Kent St which was used for general Diocesan purposes.
