= Society of the Sacred Advent =

Anglican religious order founded in Brisbane, Queensland, Australia

The Society of the Sacred Advent is an Anglican religious order founded at Brisbane, Queensland, Australia, in 1892 by Caroline Amy Balguy (1833–1915), and still active in that city.

== History ==
Known as Sister Caroline Amy and, later, Mother Caroline, Caroline Amy Balguy started her religious life at the Community of St John Baptist in Clewer, England. She came to Australia on 9 December 1892 at the request of the Reverend Montagu John Stone-Wigg, Vicar and Canon Residentiary of St John’s Pro-Cathedral, who saw the need for an Anglican religious order for women in Brisbane.

In its early days the Society of the Sacred Advent focused on ministering to the needs of women and children, establishing several schools and children’s homes throughout Queensland. In 1895 the Sisters opened a boarding school for girls in Nundah, at the site of a former boys' school, known as Eton High School. On 8 July 1910, under the guidance of Mother Emma Crawford, the Sisters moved into Community House in Albion, where they remained until the early 2000s. In more recent times the Professed Sisters have taken up residence in a retirement village on the northside of Brisbane.

From 2017 the Society began to explore a new way of being a religious order by creating a category of Vowed Members to work alongside the Professed Sisters. Vowed Members are women who are professed, but who live in the wider community and who may also be married. Women and men may also become Companions of the Society.

== Character ==
As expressed on the Anglican Religious Communities website, The Society of the Sacred Advent exists "for the glory of God and for the service of His Church in preparation for the Second Coming of our Lord and Saviour Jesus Christ". To this end, the Sisters devote themselves to God in community under vows of poverty, chastity and obedience, leading a life of prayer, silence and work. The Sisters' aim is "to point the way to Jesus in our own time, to a world which has largely lost touch with spiritual realities and is caught up in despair, loneliness and fear". The patron saint of the order is St John the Baptist.

== Current life and work ==
The Society has two schools located in Brisbane, Australia - St Margaret's and St Aidan's; both are for girls only. Although the Sisters are no longer involved in the day-to-day running of the schools, they and the Vowed Members remain active on each of the School Councils and the Schools Trust. The Sisters also conduct regular quiet days and retreats which are open to members of the public. Attendees can enjoy a day of quiet prayer in the Sister's Chapel and the beautiful gardens surrounding Community House. A traditional labyrinth is also available for use. Details for quiet days and retreats may be found on the Society's website.

In 2022, the Society celebrated 130 years of presence and ministry in Queensland. In 2023 the Society welcomed its first two Vowed Members into the Order in a service of profession in the historic SSA Chapel in Albion. The Society still owns St Margaret's and St Aidan's schools in Brisbane, through the SSA Schools Trust Pty Ltd. Other schools established by the order are now managed by the relevant Anglican diocese.

== Notable members ==
- Emma Crawford
