= Anglican Primate of Australia =

Senior bishop of the Anglican Church of Australia

Primate of Australia
- Coat of Arms of the Anglican Church of Australia
- Incumbent; Mark Short since 1 November 2025
- Style: The Most Reverend
- Status: President of the General Synod of the Anglican Church of Australia
- Reports to: General Synod of the Anglican Church of Australia
- Appointer: Board of Electors (elected by the Board from among the diocesan bishops of the Anglican Church of Australia)
- Term length: Six years (three years for a second consecutive term)
- Constituting instrument: Primate Canon 1985
- Formation: 1847
- First holder: William Broughton
- Deputy: an Acting Primate
- Website: Primate, Anglican Church of Australia

The Anglican Primate of Australia is the senior bishop and President of the General Synod of the Anglican Church of Australia. Between General Synods, the Primate is also President of the Standing Committee of the General Synod which takes responsibility for the affairs of the General Synod in between General Synod sessions. The Primate is elected from among the country's Anglican diocesan bishops, by a Board of Electors, comprising diocesan bishops and representative clergy and laity.

== List ==
Ex officio primates
From	Until	Incumbent	Notes
1847	1849	William Broughton, Bishop of Australia	Only Primate of Australasia.
1849	1854	William Broughton, Bishop of Sydney	Only Primate of Australasia.
1854	1882	Frederic Barker, Bishop of Sydney	First Primate of Australia ex officio as Bishop of Sydney.
1884	1889	Alfred Barry, Bishop of Sydney	Ex officio primate as Bishop of Sydney.
1890	1897	Saumarez Smith, Bishop of Sydney	Ex officio primate as Bishop/Archbishop of Sydney; died in office.
1897	1909	Saumarez Smith, Archbishop of Sydney	Ex officio primate as Bishop/Archbishop of Sydney; died in office.
Elected primates
From	Until	Incumbent	Notes
1910	1933	John Wright, Archbishop of Sydney	Also Archbishop of Sydney since 1909; died in office.
1935	1946	Henry Le Fanu, Archbishop of Perth	Also Archbishop of Perth since 1929; died in office.
1947	1958	Howard Mowll, Archbishop of Sydney	Also Archbishop of Sydney since 1933; died in office.
1959	1966	Hugh Gough, Archbishop of Sydney	Also Archbishop of Sydney since 1959.
1966	1971	Sir Philip Strong, Archbishop of Brisbane	Also Archbishop of Brisbane since 1962.
1971	1977	Sir Frank Woods, Archbishop of Melbourne	Also Archbishop of Melbourne since 1957; knighted in 1972.
1977	1982	Sir Marcus Loane, Archbishop of Sydney	Also Archbishop of Sydney since 1964; knighted in 1976.
1982	1989	Sir John Grindrod, Archbishop of Brisbane	Also Archbishop of Brisbane since 1980; knighted in 1982.
1991	1999	Keith Rayner, Archbishop of Melbourne	Acting Primate 1989–1991. Also Archbishop of Melbourne since 1990.
1999	2004	Peter Carnley, Archbishop of Perth	Also Archbishop of Perth since 1981.
2004	4 July 2014	Phillip Aspinall, Archbishop of Brisbane	Also Archbishop of Brisbane since 2002
4 July 2014	31 March 2020	Philip Freier, Archbishop of Melbourne	Also Archbishop of Melbourne since 2006. In the brief April 2020 vacancy, Aspinall served as interim Primate.
7 April 2020	31 October 2025	Geoffrey Smith, Archbishop of Adelaide	Also Archbishop of Adelaide since 2017.
1 November 2025	Onwards	Mark Short, Bishop of Canberra and Goulburn	Also Bishop of Canberra and Goulburn since 2019. First non-metropolitan to serve as primate.
