= John Wright (archbishop of Sydney) =

Australian Anglican bishop (1861–1933)

The Most Reverend John Wright
- Archbishop of Sydney
- Caricature by David Low
- Church: Church of England
- Province: New South Wales
- Diocese: Sydney
- In office: 1910–1933
- Predecessor: Saumarez Smith
- Successor: Howard Mowll
- Other posts: Metropolitan of New South Wales; (ex officio); Primate of Australia; (1910–1933)
- Previous posts: Canon of Manchester Cathedral; Rector of St George's, Hulme; Chaplain to the Bishop of Manchester

Orders
- Ordination: 31 May 1885 (as deacon); 20 June 1886 (as priest)
- Consecration: 24 August 1909

Personal details
- Born: John Charles Wright; 19 August 1861 Bolton, Lancashire, England
- Died: 24 February 1933 (aged 71) Christchurch, New Zealand
- Buried: South Head cemetery, Sydney
- Denomination: Anglican
- Parents: Joseph Farrall Wright; Harriet, née Swallow
- Spouse: Dorothy Margaret Isabella Fiennes (m. 1903)
- Children: 4
- Education: Manchester Grammar School, Merton College, Oxford
- Coat of arms

John Charles Wright (19 August 1861 – 24 February 1933) was a British-born Anglican bishop in Australia. He was an Archbishop of Sydney and was seen by some as responsible for reducing the influence of Anglo-Catholicism in the Diocese of Sydney.

Wright was born in Bolton, Lancashire, England, the son of the Reverend Joseph Farrall Wright (1827–1883), vicar of Christ Church, Bolton, and co-founder of Bolton Wanderers Football Club, and his wife Harriet, née Swallow. He was educated at Manchester Grammar School and Merton College, Oxford, where he graduated with honours in 1884.

Wright was ordained deacon on 31 May 1885 and priest on 20 June 1886.

Immediately before Wright came to Sydney he was "permanent chairman" of the Anglican Evangelical Group Movement – at that time an important liberal Evangelical society of clergy formed in 1906. Stephen Judd notes that he "believed in a much wider spectrum of opinion in the Anglican Church" and it is significant that he quickly appointed moderate Evangelicals Albert Talbot as Dean of Sydney and David Davies as principal of Moore College.

It was Wright who banned the eucharistic vestments from use in churches in Sydney. He was criticised for this by Anglo-Catholics, but he conscientiously believed that the wearing of these was contrary to the law of the Church of England.
