= Frederic Barker =

Australian bishop

The Right Reverend Frederic Barker
- Bishop of Sydney
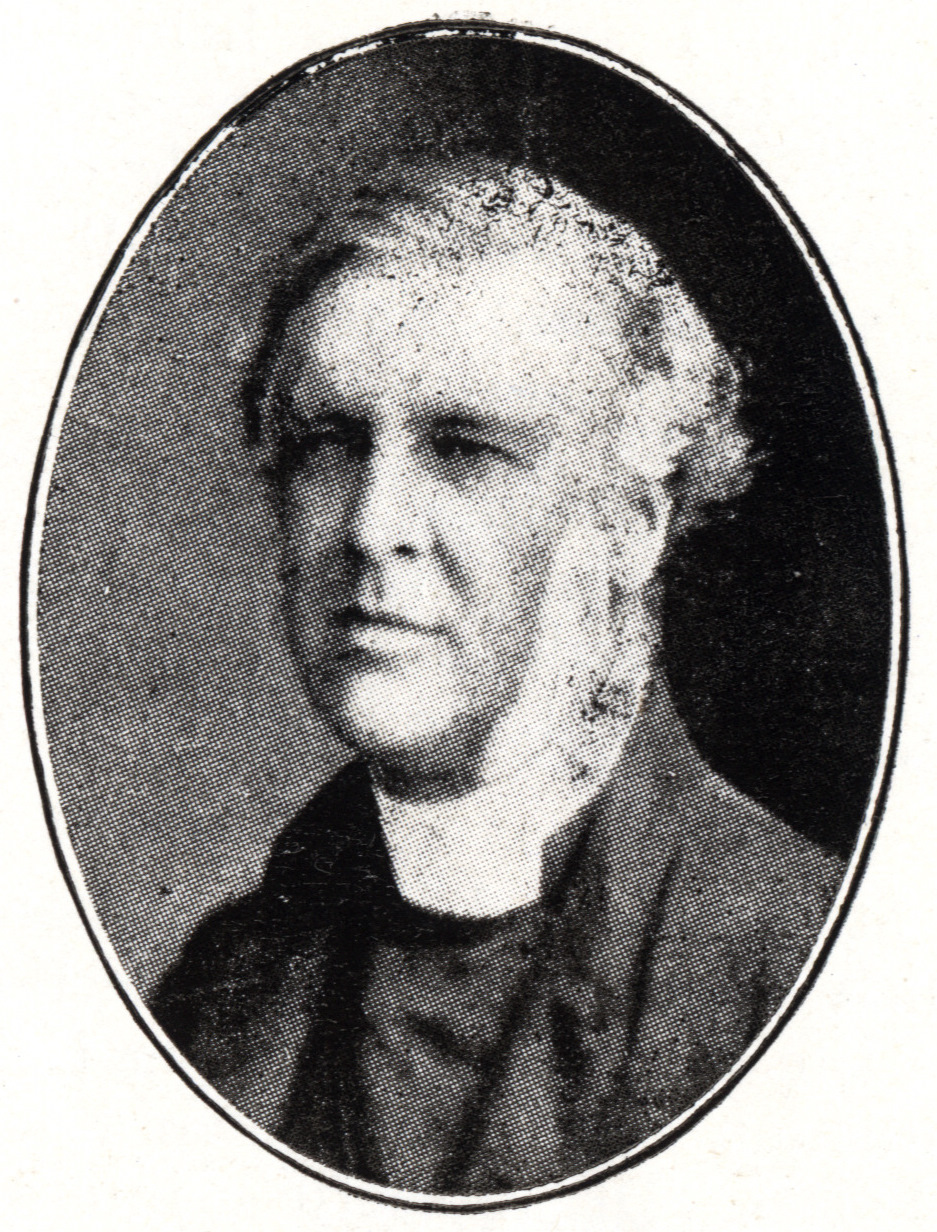
- Church: Church of England
- Diocese: Sydney
- In office: 1855–1882
- Predecessor: William Broughton
- Successor: Alfred Barry
- Other post: Primate of Australia (ex officio)
- Previous posts: Vicar of Baslow, Derbyshire, England

Orders
- Ordination: 15 April 1832
- Consecration: 30 November 1854

Personal details
- Born: 17 March 1808 Baslow, Derbyshire, England
- Died: 6 April 1882 (aged 74) San Remo, Italy
- Denomination: Anglican
- Parents: John Barker; Jane, née Whyte
- Spouse: Jane Sophia Harden (after 1840); Mary Jane Woods (after 1878)
- Education: The King's School, Grantham; Jesus College, Cambridge
- Coat of arms: Frederic Barker's coat of arms

Frederic Barker (17 March 1808 – 6 April 1882) was the second Anglican bishop of Sydney.

== Early life ==
Barker was born at Baslow, Derbyshire, England, fifth son of the Rev. John Barker and his wife Jane, née Whyte. He was educated at The King's School, Grantham and Jesus College, Cambridge, where he graduated B.A. in 1831, M. A. 1839. While at Cambridge he was influenced by Charles Simeon. He was made deacon on 10 April 1831 by the Bishop of Rochester; he was ordained a priest on 15 April 1832.

== Late life and legacy ==
Due to his height and his abstinence from alcohol, the term 'Bishop Barker' was jocularly applied to the tallest beer glass available in late-19th-century Sydney hotels.

The Sydney North Shore private school, Barker College (founded 1890), was named in honour of Barker by founder Rev. Henry Plume.
