= Thomas Morley (bishop) =

Thomas Morley was the Bishop of Marlborough from 1537 until 1561. He was a former Abbot of Stanley, and was consecrated as Bishop on 4 November 1537. His death is thought to have occurred in 1561. He is also recorded as Thomas Calne and Thomas Bickley.
