= Howard Mowll =

Australian bishop

The Most Reverend Howard Mowll
- Archbishop of Sydney
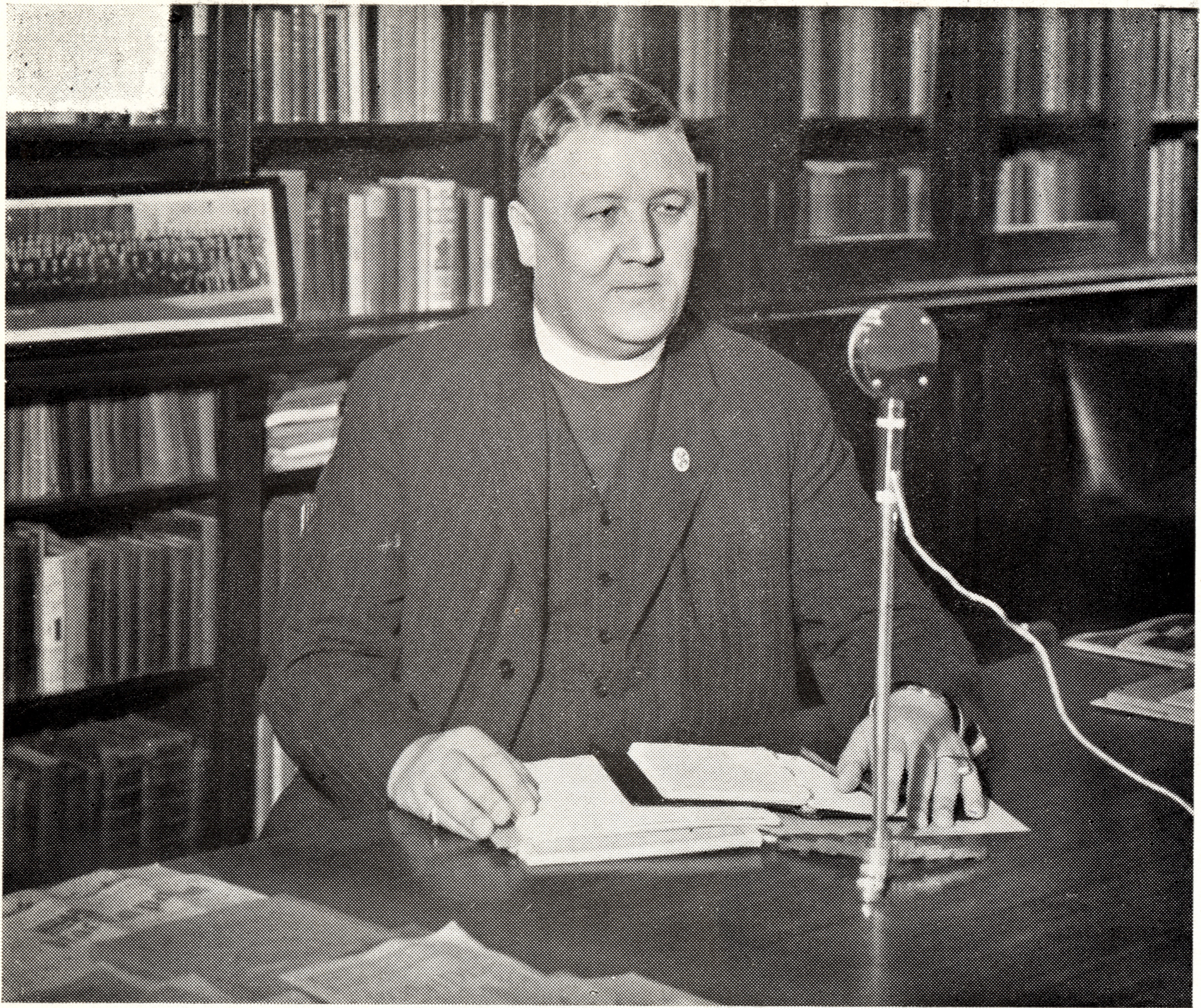
- Church: Church of England
- Province: New South Wales
- Diocese: Sydney
- In office: 1933–1958
- Predecessor: John Wright
- Successor: Hugh Gough
- Other posts: Metropolitan of New South Wales; (ex officio); Bishop of Western China; (1926–1933); Primate of Australia; (1947–1958)
- Previous post: Assistant Bishop and Bishop of Western China

Orders
- Ordination: 21 September 1913 (as deacon) by Edmund Knox; 7 June 1914 (as priest) by Randall Davidson
- Consecration: 24 June 1922

Personal details
- Born: Howard West Kilvinton Mowll; 2 February 1890 Chaldercot, near Dover, Kent, England
- Died: 24 October 1958 (aged 68) St Luke's Private Hospital, Potts Point, New South Wales
- Denomination: Anglican
- Parents: Henry Martyn Mowll; Gertrude Emily, née Worsfold
- Spouse: Dorothy Anne Martin (m. 1924)
- Education: Dover College; The King's School, Canterbury
- Alma mater: King's College, Cambridge
- Coat of arms

Howard West Kilvinton Mowll (2 February 1890 – 24 October 1958) was the Anglican Bishop of Western China from 1926 to 1933, and Archbishop of Sydney from 1933 until his death in 1958.

== Early life ==
Mowll was born in Dover and was educated at the King's School, Canterbury, King's College, Cambridge, and Ridley Hall. He was the eldest of six children of Henry Martyn Mowll, a solicitor, and his wife Gertrude Emily Worsfold, a daughter of C. K. Worsfold, who had married in April 1889. He had four brothers and a sister. In 1911, the family had four servants.

== Career ==
In 1913 Mowll was appointed as a tutor at Wycliffe College, Toronto, where he went on to serve as Dean from 1919 to 1922.

In June 1922, Mowll was consecrated as a bishop at Westminster Abbey and sailed to become Assistant Bishop to William Cassels, Bishop of Western China. In 1926, he succeeded him as bishop, remaining in post until 1933, when he was elected as Archbishop of Sydney.

Mowll's election as Archbishop was a pivotal moment for the diocese of Sydney. His predecessor, Archbishop Wright, in office since 1909, had been a liberal reformer, while Mowll had always stood firm against liberalism and was a staunch and unashamed Conservative evangelical. A campaign to promote Mowll was led by Archdeacon Langford Smith, supported by D. J. Knox and R. B. Robinson. They arranged meetings in the parishes to highlight the strengths of Mowll, and articles in The Australian Church Record and The Sydney Morning Herald. The other leading candidates were John Moyes, Bishop of Armidale, an advocate for the "social gospel", and Joseph Hunkin, Rector of Rugby and Archdeacon of Coventry, a Liberal Evangelical. Mowll was elected in a landslide, and this was a decisive turning point for the diocese, changing its direction from Liberal to Conservative Evangelicalism, its dominant culture well into the 21st century.

In 1934, Mowll was chosen as Sub-Prelate of the Venerable Order of St John of Jerusalem.

Within a month of the Second World War starting, Mowll had formed the Church of England National Emergency Fund (CENEF), which was supported with volunteers and fundraising by the Sydney Diocesan Churchwomen's Association. CENEF funded huts for recreation and chaplains in military camps around Sydney, as well as at St Andrew's Cathedral, Sydney, and other churches around the city. To continue to help ex-service people after the war and youth work, CENEF raised funds to buy 201 Castlereagh Street, Sydney, and Rathane in the Royal National Park. CENEF leveraged the Castlereagh Street building to buy land at Gilbulla and 117 acres in Castle Hill for a retirement village. This retirement village was one of his great achievements (some say his wife Dorothy was the driving force behind the idea), and became the first retirement village in Australia. Today this site remains the flagship for Anglican Retirement Villages, Diocese of Sydney.

In 1946, Mowll became Chairman of the National Missionary Council of Australia and Tasmania, and President of the Australian Section of the World Council of Churches. Having risen to national prominence during the war years, in 1947 he was elected as Primate of Australia.

As Archbishop of Sydney, Mowll consistently promoted evangelism and in 1958 he invited Billy Graham to conduct a "crusade" in the city. Mowll did not live to see this take place, but in April and May 1959 about one quarter of Sydney's population attended and 57,000 responded to the Gospel call.

== Personal life ==
On 23 October 1924, in a Church of England religious ceremony at Mienchu, Mowll married Dorothy Anne Martin, a missionary, the daughter of a clergyman, John Martin. The marriage was repeated in the British Consulate-General in Chengtu in December 1924. They had no children.

Dorothy Mowll died before her husband on 23 December 1957, leaving an estate in England valued at £10,236.

== See also ==
- Anglican Diocese of Sydney
- Anglicanism in Sichuan
