= Fawell =

Fawell is a surname. Notable people with the surname include:

- Beverly Fawell (1930–2013), American politician, sister-in-law of Harris
- Harris Fawell (1929–2021), American politician
- Scott Fawell, American politician
- William Fawell, Archdeacon of Totnes

== See also ==
- Falwell
