= Herbert Barnes =

English Anglican clergyman

The Reverend Canon Herbert Barnes
- Church: Church of England

Personal details
- Born: 3 July 1832 Sowton, Devon, England
- Died: 15 October 1890 (aged 58) Exeter, Devon, England
- Education: Christ Church, Oxford (BA, MA)

Rev. Canon Herbert Barnes, MA (3 July 1832 – 15 October 1890) was an English Anglican clergyman who was Archdeacon of Barnstaple from 1885–90. He was also Treasurer and Canon of Exeter Cathedral.

He was born in Sowton, Devon, to Venerable George Barnes and Harriet Penelope Rivett-Carnac. His father was also Archdeacon of Barnstaple and was the first Archdeacon of Madras. His paternal grandfather, Ralph Barnes, was the Archdeacon of Totnes and Chancellor of Exeter Cathedral.

Barnes was educated at Christ Church, Oxford, graduating B.A. in 1855 and M.A. in 1855. His elder brother, George Carnac Barnes (1818–1861), was a colonial administrator in India. He married Charlotte Kitson, in Madras. She died in 1880. After a long illness, he died at the Cathedral Close, Exeter in 1890.

Church of England titles
Preceded by Henry Woolcombe	Archdeacon of Barnstaple; 1885–1890	Succeeded by Albert Seymour
