= Cowe =

Cowe is a surname. Notable people with this surname include:

- Jim Cowe, New Zealand football player
- John Cowe McIntosh (1892–1921), British-born Australian aviator
- Madeline Cowe, Australian TV Host, model, and beauty pageant titleholder
- Richard Cowe, English archdeacon
- S. Peter Cowe, professor Armenian studies
- Simon Cowe (1948–2015), English guitarist
- Steve Cowe (born 1974), English football player

== See also ==
- Sin Cowe Island, Vietnam
