= De Charlton =

de Charlton or De Charlton is a surname. Notable people with the name include the following:

- Roger de Charlton, English Archdeacon (fl. 1325 - 1338)
- Thomas de Charlton, English Archdeacon (fl. 1302)

== See also ==
- Charlton (surname)
- Charlton (given name)
- Lewis de Charleton
