= John Cole (priest) =

Archdeacon of Totnes

John Cole was the Archdeacon of Totnes between 1580 and 1583.

Church of England titles
Preceded by Oliver Whiddon	Archdeacon of Totnes; 1580–1583	Succeeded by Lewis Swete
