= Thomas Kent (disambiguation) =

Thomas Kent may refer to:

- Thomas Kent (1865–1916), Irish rebel executed in 1916
- Thomas Kent (Irish judge) (c. 1460–1511), Chief Baron of the Irish Exchequer
- Thomas Worrall Kent (1922–2011), Canadian public servant and journalist
- Thomas Kent (MP) (1590–1656), English politician
- Thomas Kent (priest) (died 1561), Archdeacon of Totnes
- Tom Kent, disc jockey
- Tom Kent (rugby) (1864–1928), England and British Isles rugby union player
- Tom Kent (Casualty), a fictional character from the BBC television drama Casualty, played by Oliver Coleman
