= Oliver Whiddon =

Archdeacon of Totnes

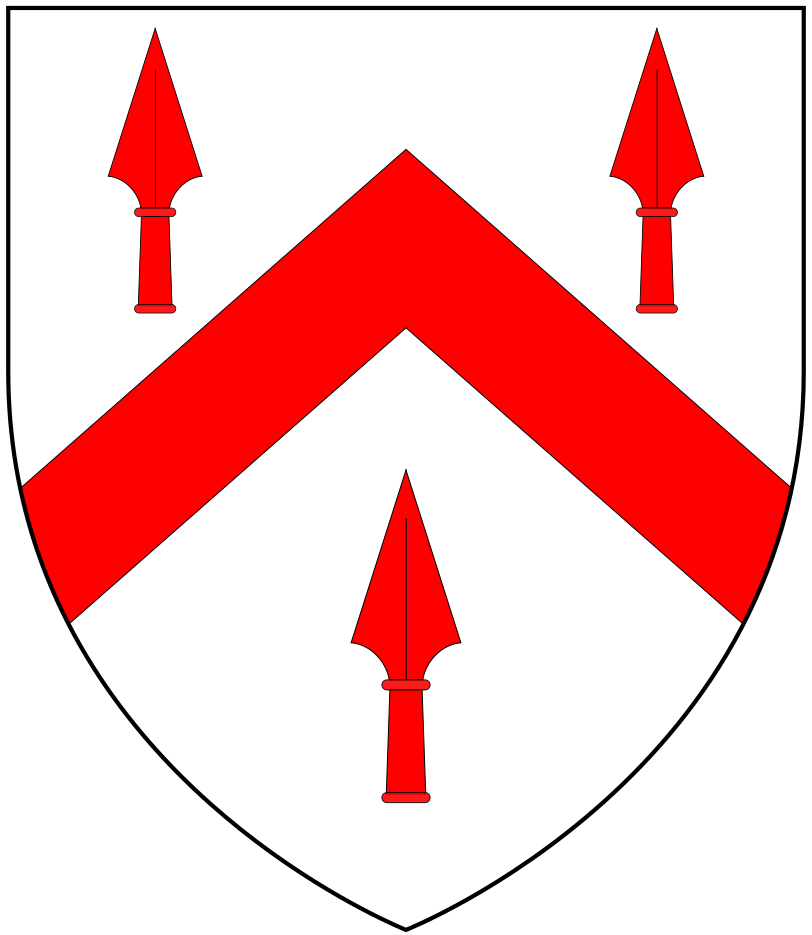
Arms of Whiddon: Argent, a chevron between three spearheads gules

Oliver Whiddon was Archdeacon of Totnes between 1568 and 1580.

He was the third son of Sir John Whiddon (died 1576), of Whiddon in the parish of Chagford, Devon, a Justice of the King's Bench. His mother was Sir John's second wife Elizabeth Shilston, a daughter and co-heiress of William Shilston.

He graduated from Oxford University B.A. in 1560/1 and M.A. in 1563 and was a fellow of Exeter College in October and November, 1573. He was appointed a Canon of Exeter 1567 and Archdeacon of Totnes from 1568 to 1580. He was rector of North Bovey 1562, of Combinteignhead 1572 and of Haccombe, 1575, and of Yoxall, Staffordshire.
