= John Fulford (English priest) =

English archdeacon

John Fulford (died 12 June 1518) was an English archdeacon.

He was the son of Sir Baldwin Fulford of Great Fulford, Devon who was Sheriff of Devon in 1460.

He was collated Archdeacon of Totnes from 1500 to 1515, Archdeacon of Cornwall from April to September 1515 and Archdeacon of Exeter from 1515 to 1518.

Church of England titles
Preceded by Ralph Heathcott	Archdeacon of Totnes; 1500–1515	Succeeded by Richard Sydnor
