= John de Northwode =

English medieval churchman and university chancellor

John Northwood was an English medieval churchman and university chancellor.

== Origins ==
Born about 1310, he was the son of John Northwood (died 1318) and his wife Agnes Grandison, daughter of Sir William Grandison (died 1335), and thus the nephew of John Grandison, bishop of Exeter.

== Career ==
From 29 November 1329 until 1330, he was Archdeacon of Exeter in Devon, later holding the post of Archdeacon of Totnes, also in Devon, from 1338 until 1349. He was appointed Chancellor of the University of Oxford from 1345 to 1349. He died in or after 1349 and a brass plaque to his memory was placed in the collegiate church of Ottery St Mary in Devon.

Church of England titles
Preceded by Thomas de Hereward	Archdeacon of Exeter; 1329–1330	Succeeded by William de Grandisson
Preceded by Roger de Charlton	Archdeacon of Totnes; 1338–1349	Succeeded by Peter de Gildesburgh
Academic offices
Preceded by William de Bergeveney	Chancellor of the University of Oxford; 1345–1349	Succeeded by William de Hawkesworth
