= John Cobham (archdeacon of Durham) =

British Anglican priest and author (1899–1987)

John Oldcastle Cobham (1899–1987) was an Anglican priest and author.

Cobham was born on 11 April 1899. He was the son of John Lawrence Cobham, archdeacon of Totnes from 1933 until 1947. He educated at St Lawrence College, Ramsgate; Tonbridge School; Corpus Christi College, Cambridge; the University of Marburg; Westcott House, Cambridge and the Académie Goetz. During the First World War he served in the Royal Field Artillery from 1917 to 1919.

He was ordained deacon in 1926 and priest in 1927. His first post was as curate at St Thomas, Winchester. He was vice-principal of Westcott House, Cambridge from 1930 to 1934; and principal of The Queen's Foundation, Birmingham from 1934 to 1953. During the Second World War he was vicar of St Benet, Cambridge and a Chaplain to the British Armed Forces. He was a lecturer in theology at the University of Birmingham from 1946 to 1953; and Archdeacon of Durham from 1953 until 1969.

He died on 20 May 1987.

== Selected works ==
- Concerning Spiritual Gifts, 1933
- Barth in Revelation, a Symposium, 1937
- No Other Gospel, 1943
- The Significance of the Barmen Declaration for the Oecumenical Church, 1943
- The Theological Word Book of the Bible, 1950
