= Chaderton =

Chaderton is a surname. Notable people with the surname include:

- Edmund Chaderton, English archdeacon
- Laurence Chaderton (c. 1536–1640), English Puritan divine
- Roy Chaderton (born 1942), Venezuelan politician, lawyer, and diplomat
- William Chaderton (c. 1540–1608), English academic and bishop
