= George Barnes (priest) =

English churchman

- Born: 11 December 1782
- Died: 29 June 1847 (aged 64); The Rectory, Sowton, Devon, England
- Occupation: Archdeacon of Barnstaple

George Barnes, D.D. (11 December 1782 – 29 June 1847) was an English churchman, the Archdeacon of Barnstaple from 1830 to 1847.

Barnes first enrolled in Exeter College, Oxford on 30 October 1799. He graduated from the college in 1814. He also served as the inaugural Archdeacon of Bombay but declined the Bishopric of Calcutta. His father was Archdeacon of Totnes from 1775 to 1820.

In 1815, Barnes founded the Bombay Education Society, which established the Christ Church School and Barnes School in India.

His eldest son George Carnac Barnes (1818–1861) was an administrator in India, and his son Herbert Barnes was also Archdeacon of Barnstaple.
