= Thomas Larkham =

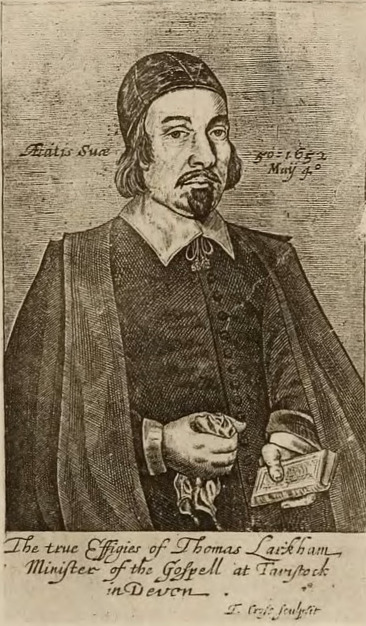
- Larkham, c. 1919
- Born: 17 August 1602; Lyme Regis, Dorset, England
- Died: c. December 1669 (aged 67); Tavistock, Devon, England
- Occupations: Minister; chaplain; apothecary
- Spouse: Patience Wilton (m. 1622)
- Children: 4

Thomas Larkham or Larcome (1602–1669) was an English Puritan minister, chaplain, and apothecary who was an early but not permanent settler at Dover, New Hampshire.

== Life ==
He was born at Lyme Regis, Dorset, on 17 August 1602, matriculated at Trinity College, Cambridge in 1619, and proceeded B.A. from Trinity Hall in 1622, and M.A. 1626. In 1622 he was living at Shobrooke, near Crediton, where he married.

He was instituted vicar of Northam, near Bideford, on 26 December 1626, where his puritan views brought him into trouble. A petition against him was delivered about 1639, and he was proceeded against in the Consistory Court at Exeter. In 1640 Larkham left with his family for New England, going first to Massachusetts, but moved on to Dover called also then Northam. Here he became minister, ousting a Mr. Knollys. Larkham's conduct in taking on civil as well as religious authority led to much discontent and even open warfare, and commissioners from Boston, of whom Hugh Peters was one, were sent to arbitrate. They found both parties in fault. Larkham remained at Dover until the end of 1642, when, in the account of John Winthrop, he left for England after promising not to; Winthrop also mentions the birth of an illegitimate child of which Larkham was admitted to be the father. Larkham himself gives the date of his departure with his son Thomas as 14 November.

In England he became chaplain in Sir Hardres Waller's regiment going to Ireland. On 30 January 1648 he went to Devon, proceeding in the following April to Tavistock, where Sir Hardres then had his headquarters. The vicarage of St Eustachius' Church, Tavistock had been vacant since George Hughes accepted a call from the people of Plymouth on 21 October 1643. Larkham had succeeded to the vicarage by 1649. According to the report of the commissioners, who, under the Act for Providing Maintenance for Preaching Ministers, visited Tavistock on 18 October 1650, Larkham was elected by the inhabitants, and presented by the Earl of Bedford.

On 15 November 1649 he had been dismissed from his post as chaplain of Waller's regiment, after a court-martial, which sat for two days at Plymouth, had found him guilty of inciting to insubordination. He seems nevertheless to have secured some other military post, for he speaks of receiving money in 1651 at a muster in Carlisle; and on 11 June 1652 pay from Ebthery at Bristol. He was absent from Tavistock almost the whole of 1651–2, to the discontent of his congregation. In 1657 Larkham attacked his chief enemies in a tract. Five leading parishioners replied. It included denunciations of Larkham's affection for sack and bowls, which his Diary corroborates. They also allude to his published attacks on tithes; his Diary proves that he made every effort to exact tithes from refractory farmers.

Accusations of immorality in New England and at home had, it was further declared, been brought against him by one of the commissioners. Larkham retorted in a pamphlet and his enemies answered him again. Larkham allowed the controversy to drop there. He had in the pulpit spoken against neighbouring ministers and John Howe, then of Great Torrington, openly protested against one of Larkham's sermons, which was afterwards published in his Attributes of God, 1656. In October 1659 a weekly lecture was established in Tavistock by his opponents, and the neighbouring ministers officiated. Larkham resisted the arrangement, but the council of state ordered the justices living near Tavistock (17 March 1659–60) to take measures to continue the lectures, and to examine witnesses.

The charges chiefly consisted of expressions he had used in sermons, in derogation of the restored Long Parliament, and in contempt of George Monck. The justices sat to hear evidence on 17 April, and Larkham was ordered to admit others to preach in the parish church. On 19 October the justices met to consider whether he had been legally appointed to the vicarage of Tavistock, and he was bound over to appear at the Exeter assizes. Shortly after the 21st Larkham, in compliance with the Earl of Bedford's desire, resigned the benefice. He was arrested on 18 January 1661, and spent eighty-four days in prison at Exeter. On his release he returned to Tavistock, living with his son-in-law, Condy, and preaching occasionally in retired places, but left the town on being warned of impending prosecutions under the Five Mile Act.

In 1664 he became partner with Mr. County, an apothecary in Tavistock, and carried on the business successfully after Mr. County's death. The last entry in his diary is dated 17 November 1669, and he was buried at Tavistock on 23 December.

One might consider that Condy and County could be two spellings of the same surname, and that Thomas Larkham might have taken up Apothecary with his son in law, as one of his daughters had indeed married a Mr. Condy. Regrettably, records from the 1600s remain scarce, but possibly, more will be recovered since Dr. Susan Moore has published her edition, with extra materials, of Larkham's Daily Journal, his Diary.

== Works ==
His other works are:

- 'The Wedding Supper,' London, 1652. Dedicated to the parliament.
- 'A Discourse of Paying of Tithes by T. L., M.A., Pastour of the Church of Tavistocke,' London, 1656. Dedicated to Oliver Cromwell.
- 'The Attributes of God,' &c., London, 1656. Dedicated to the fellows, masters, and presidents of colleges at Cambridge.

His manuscript Diary from 1650 to 1669 was edited, abbreviated and expurgated, by the Rev. W. Lewis.

== Family ==
On 22 June 1622 he married Patience, daughter of George Wilton, schoolmaster, of Crediton. Of this marriage were born four children: Thomas, died in the West Indies, 1648; George, went to Oxford and became minister of Cockermouth; Patience, married Lieutenant Miller, who died in Ireland, 1656; and Jane, married Daniel Condy of Tavistock.
