= William Cotton (bishop) =

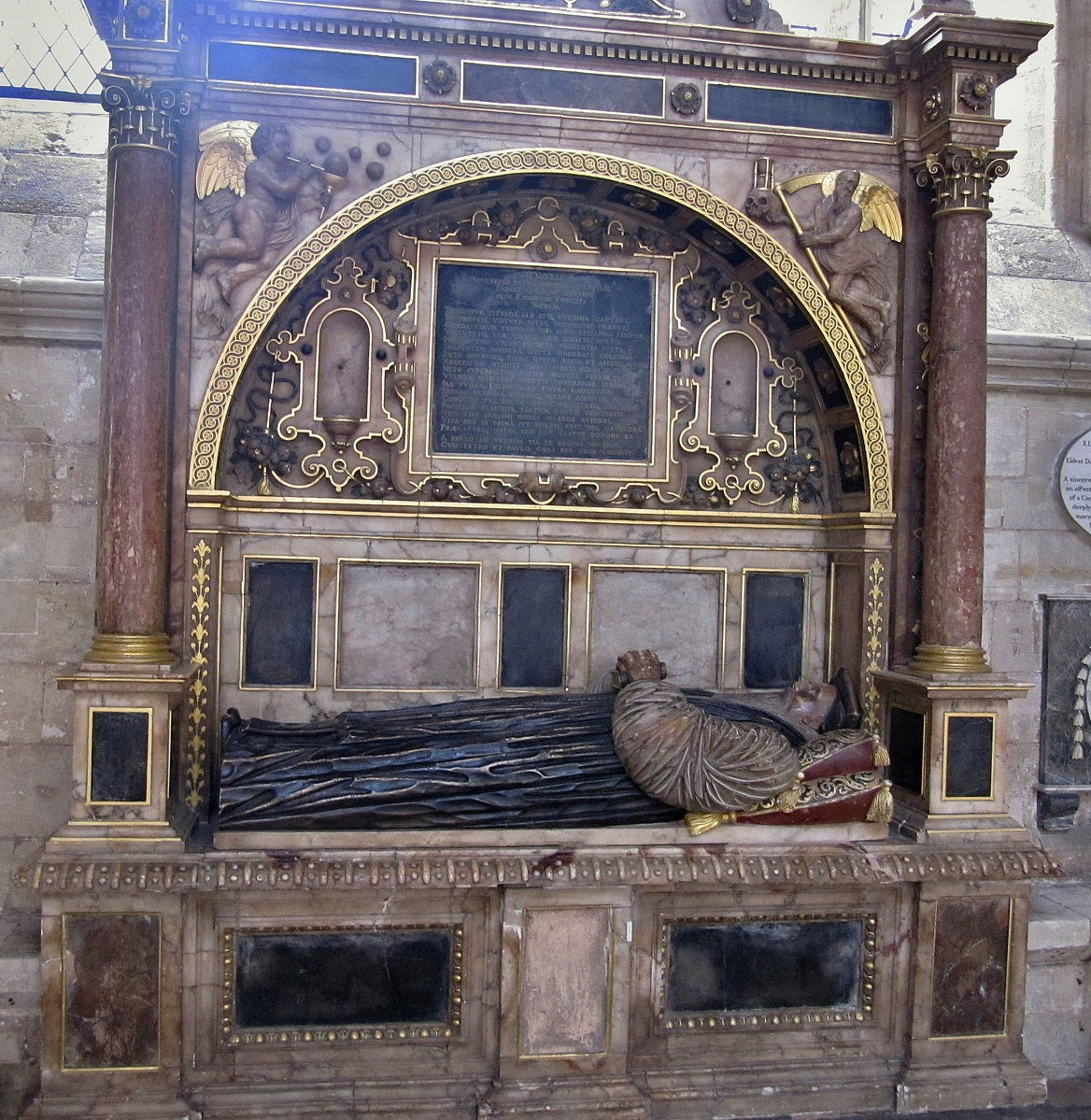
Monument and effigy of Bishop William Cotton in Exeter Cathedral

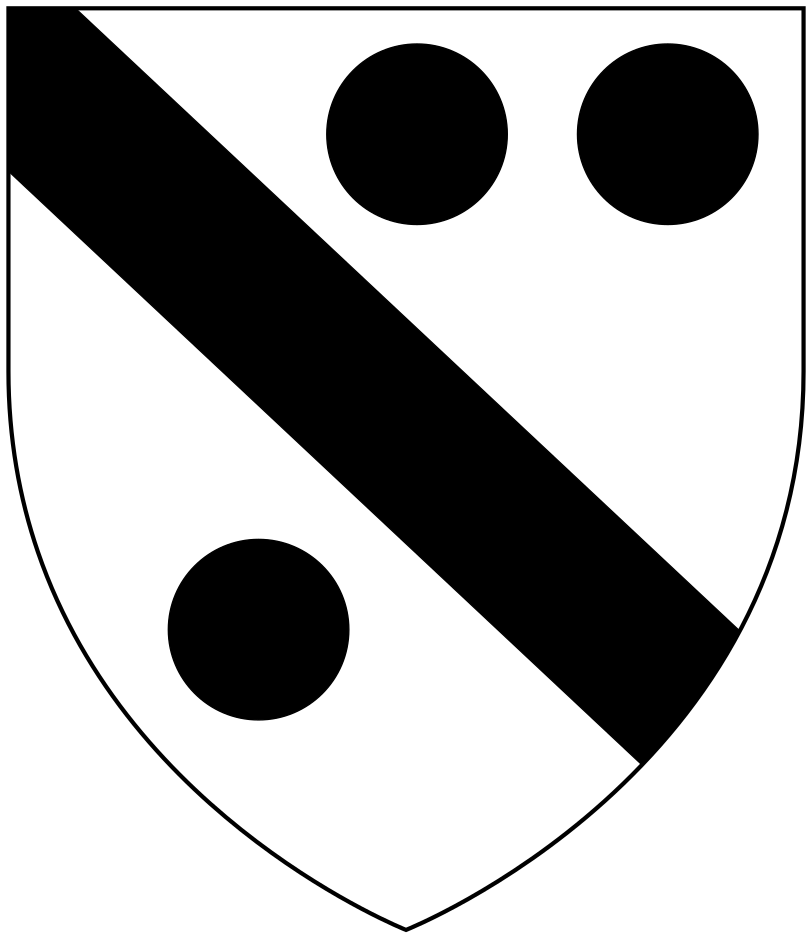
Arms of Cotton (Ancient): Argent, a bend sable between three pellets, as seen on top of the monument of Bishop William Cotton in Exeter Cathedral

William Cotton (died 1621) was Bishop of Exeter, in Devon, from 1598 to his death in 1621.

== Origins ==
William Cotton was brought up in Finchley, Middlesex. He was the eldest son of John Cotton, a Citizen of the City of London by his wife Pery Cheyne. John Cotton was the third son of Richard Cotton (died 1534) of Hamstall Ridware in Staffordshire, descended from William Cotton (fl.1378,1400) lord of the manor of Cotton in Cheshire, by his wife Agnes de Ridware, daughter and heiress of Walter de Ridware, lord of the manor of Hamstall Ridware. The junior branch of the Cotton family descended from Agnes de Ridware adopted the armorials of Ridware (Azure, an eagle displayed argent) in lieu of their paternal arms of Cotton, which junior branch included Sir Robert Cotton, 1st Baronet (1570–1631) of Conington in Huntingdonshire, founder of the Cottonian Library. The senior branch, of which Bishop Cotton was a member, retained the ancient arms of Cotton (Argent, a bend sable between three pellets), as is visible on the monuments in Exeter Cathedral to Bishop William Cotton himself and on that of his grandson Edward Cotton (died 1675), Treasurer of Exeter Cathedral.

== Career ==
He graduated M.A. at Queens' College, Cambridge in 1575. He was Archdeacon of Lewes, in Sussex, from 1578 to 1598, when he became Bishop of Exeter.

He was confrontational in his relationship with the Puritans of his diocese. He objected strongly to the nomination of John Hazard as Bodley lecturer. Cotton suspected Hazard of "false doctrine", of intrusion into congregations that already had preachers, and association with John Traske, the seventh-day Sabbatarian, which Hazard denied. George Abbot, Archbishop of Canterbury, had licensed Hazard to preach, but Cotton was not satisfied with that.

Cotton is credited with ordering the oldest documented extant cat flap, with a payment of eight pence made to carpenters at Exeter Cathedral to cut a hole in a door to enable his cat to hunt for rodents.

== Marriage and children ==
He married Mary Hulme, a daughter of Thomas Hulme of Cheshire and widow of William Cutler, a Citizen of the City of London. By his wife he had children as follows:

- William Cotton (died 1656), eldest son and heir, Rector of Silverton, Archdeacon of Totnes, and Precentor of Exeter Cathedral, all in Devon. He married Elizabeth Hender, a daughter and co-heiress of John Hender of Botreaux Castle, Cornwall.
- Edward Cotton (died 1647), Rector of Shobrooke and Archdeacon of Totnes, both in Devon. He married Margaret Bruton (alias Breton) daughter of William Bruton of Heavitree, near Exeter. His monument survives in Shobrooke Church.
- Judith Cotton, wife first of Freeman Page of Finchley in Middlesex, secondly of Roger Coniers of Finchley, Hertfordshire (sic).

== Death and burial ==
He died on 6 August 1621 and was buried in Exeter Cathedral where his fine monument with recumbent effigy survives.

Church of England titles
Preceded by Gervase Babington	Bishop of Exeter; 1598–1621	Succeeded by Valentine Carey
