= Nicholas Kendall =

Nicholas Kendall may refer to:

- Nicholas Kendall (Conservative politician) (1800–1878), MP for East Cornwall
- Nicholas Kendall (priest) (died 1739/40), Bishop of Crediton and Bishop of Plymouth
- Nicholas Kendall (Royalist) (1577–1643), MP for Lostwithiel
