= Ralph Barnes (priest) =

English Anglican priest

Ralph Barnes (4 November 1731 – 20 May 1820) was an English Anglican priest who was the Archdeacon of Totnes from 1775 until 1820.

He was the son of Henry Barnes of St Andrew parish in London. His father was a Secondary of the Court of Common Pleas. He matriculated at Christ Church, Oxford and graduated B.A. at St Edmund Hall, Oxford in 1757 and M.A. 1760.

He died at Harberton, aged 88.

His son George and grandson Herbert Barnes were both Archdeacon of Barnstaple.

Church of England titles
Preceded by Thomas Skynner	Archdeacon of Totnes; 1775–1820	Succeeded by Robert Hurrell Froude
