= John Lucas (priest) =

British Anglican priest (1921–1992)

John Michael Lucas (13 June 1921 – 20 January 1992) was an Anglican priest: the Archdeacon of Totnes from 1976 to 1981.

He was educated at Kelly College and ordained in 1945. He held curacies at Wolborough and Ashburton before becoming Rector of Weare Giffard in 1952. He later held incumbencies at Landcross, Monkleigh, Northam and Chudleigh Knighton before his Archdeacon’s appointment.

== Notes ==
Church of England titles
Preceded by Robert John Darrell Newhouse	Archdeacon of Totnes; 1976–1981	Succeeded by Richard Stephen Hawkins
