= Richard Blunt (priest) =

Archdeacon of Totnes

Richard Blunt was Archdeacon of Totnes during 1265.
