= Douglas Dettmer =

American totton

Douglas James Dettmer (born 1964) has been the Archdeacon of Totnes since 2015.

Dettmer studied for his BA at the University of Kansas and Mdiv at Yale University. Dettmer was then ordained in 1991. After a curacy in Ilfracombe he was Domestic Chaplain to the Bishop of Exeter from 1994 to 1998. He was then Priest in charge of Thorverton and Stoke Canon until 2010 when he became Rector of Brampford Speke.

Church of England titles
Preceded by John Edmund Frank Rawlings	Archdeacon of Totnes; 2015–	Incumbent
