= George Snell (archdeacon of Totnes) =

George Snell (died 1701) was the Archdeacon of Totnes.

He was born the son of John Snell, a minister of Thurlstone, Devon and educated at Exeter College, Oxford, matriculating in 1661. He was made a fellow in 1662-1671 and awarded B.A. in 1665 and M.A. in 1668.

He became vicar of Menheniott, Cornwall in 1670 and rector of Thurlstone, Devon in 1679. He was a canon of Exeter Cathedral from 1685 to 1700 and archdeacon of Totnes from 1694 to his death in 1701.
