= Richard de Drax =

Richard de Drax was Archdeacon of Totnes from 1359 until 1361.
