= Alan Kirketon =

Alan Kirketon was the Archdeacon of Totnes from 1433 until 1443.

In 1426 he was appointed Canon of the second stall at St George's Chapel, Windsor Castle, a position he held until 1443.

Church of England titles
Preceded by John Typhane	Archdeacon of Totnes; 1433–1443	Succeeded by John Burneby
