= John Downall =

John Downall (1803–1872) was the Archdeacon of Totnes from 1859 until 1872.

He was the only son of James Downall of Liverpool and studied at Magdalen Hall, Oxford, graduating BA in 1826 and MA in 1829. He was ordained deacon in 1826 at Eccleshal, Staffordshire. His first post was as Curate at Blidworth. He then became Chaplain to the Earl of Burlington before a stint as Vicar of St George's Church, Kidderminster.

Church of England titles
Preceded by Robert Froude	Archdeacon of Totnes; 1859–1872	Succeeded by Alfred Earle
