= St Eustachius' Church, Tavistock =

Church in Devon, England

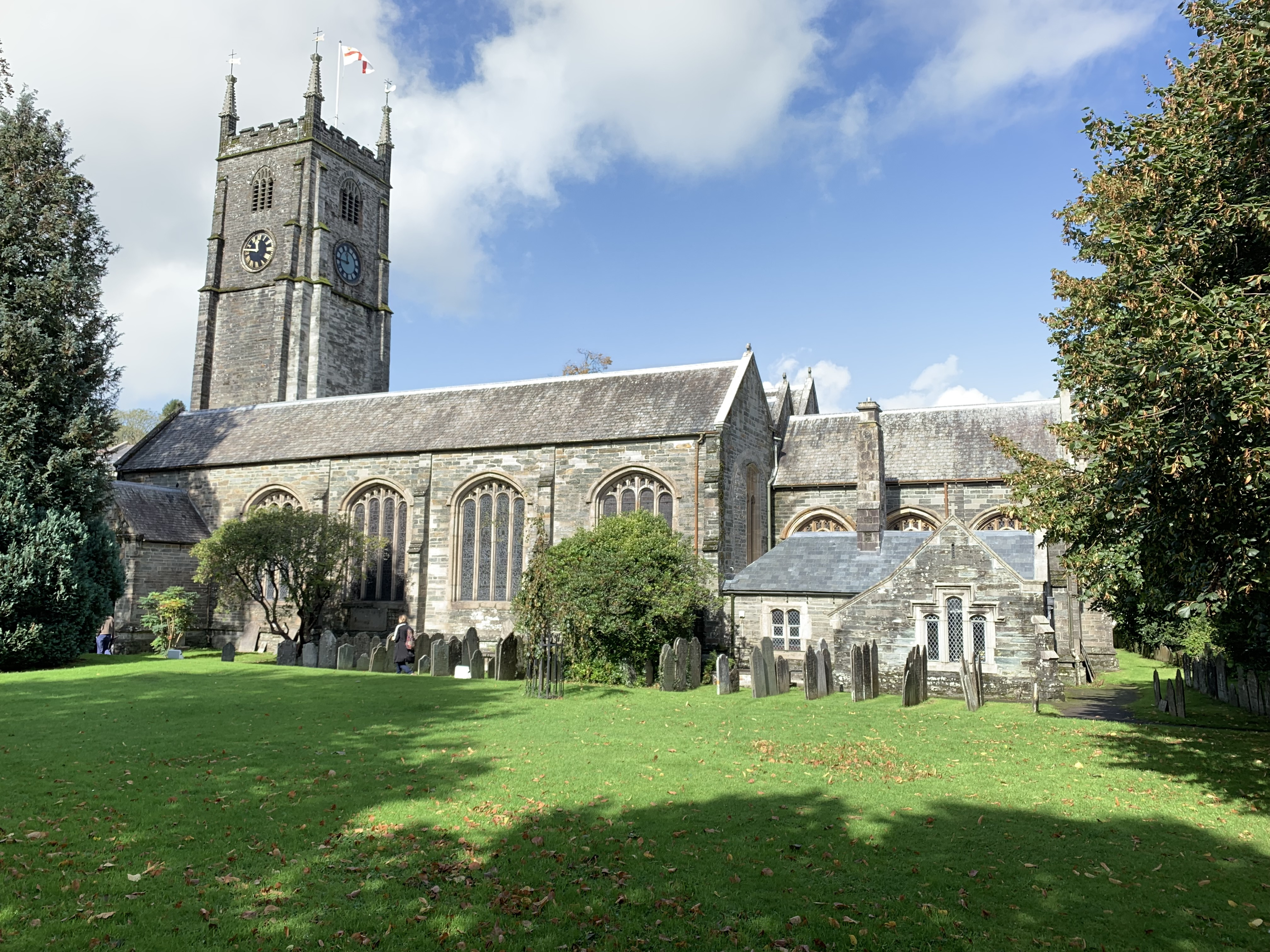
- St Eustachius' Church, Tavistock

- Location within Devon
- 50°32′58.7″N 4°8′40.1″W
- OS grid reference: SX 48123 74431
- Location: 5A Plymouth Road, Tavistock, Devon PL19 8AU
- Country: England
- Denomination: Church of England
- Previous denomination: Roman Catholic

History
- Dedication: Saint Eustace

Architecture
- Heritage designation: Grade II* listed
- Designated: 7 September 1951

Administration
- Province: Canterbury
- Diocese: Exeter
- Archdeaconry: Plymouth
- Deanery: Tavistock
- Parish: Tavistock

St Eustachius' Church, Tavistock is a Grade II* listed parish church in the Church of England Diocese of Exeter in Tavistock, Devon.

== History ==
The church was established on this site as early as 1193 but certainly by 1265. Abbot Robert Champeaux of Tavistock Abbey rebuilt it in 1318. There was further building work in 1352 and 1380.

It was largely rebuilt in the 15th century when a new chancel was added at the east end. The south aisle was added between 1445 and 1447 as a bequest from Constance Coffyn.

There was a major restoration between 1844 and 1845 by the architect John Hayward when the Caen stone pulpit by Knight of Exeter, a new reading desk, an oak organ screen and carved pew ends were added. The gallery was removed. A new organ bay in the north aisle was added, along with vestries south of the chancel. It reopened for worship on 26 June 1845.

In 1896 the font was moved to the west end of the south aisle.

Another restoration was undertaken in 1902–03. The choir stalls were removed from the chancel and new marble flooring was installed. The nave and aisles were re-floored and the roofs were overhauled when rubs and wall plates were made good, and new figures of angels restored to the positions occupied previously by similar figures. New brass lighting pendants were suspended from the roof and the seating was re-spaced. The contractor was J.A. Dennis of Tavistock, and the architect George Fellowes Prynne.

The new reredos with riddels (curtains) to the design of A.S. Parker was carved by J.R. Hunt and dedicated on 19 May 1929.

== Vicars ==
- 1309 Sir John de Cameleforde
- 1311 Sir John de Ockhampton
- 1318 Sir Robert Bodyer
- 1349 Richard de Bolham
- 1360 John, vicar of Boyton
- 1361 Baldwin Langdon
- 1382 David Bagatorre
- ???? Simon Tony
- 1391 John Hykedon, vicar of Landkey
- 1400 John Lucas
- 1416 Roger Sturt
- 1416 John Borneslo
- ???? John Baker
- 1427 Edmund Rawly
- 1434 William Mede
- 1439 John Kene
- 1443 John Skynner (or Shynner)
- 1460 Richard Haukeden
- ???? William Davy
- 1403 John Sargynt
- 1534 William Lawnder
- 1554 John Perins
- ???? Robert Knight
- 1584 Ralph Taylor
- 1585 Timothy Fisher
- 1587 Laurence Prychard
- 1592 Walter Ware
- 1600 Richard Adams
- 1603 John Ellistone
- 1612 Edward Elyott
- 1632 John Blythman
- ???? Tristram Cleake
- 1638 George Hughes
- 1649 Thomas Larkham
- 1661 Samuel Brown(e)
- 1662 Thomas Glanvil
- 1673 Jasper Cann
- 1690 William Hame
- 1697 John Rennell
- 1701 Nathaniel Beard
- 1731 William Brown
- 1747 Thomas Salmon (later Bishop of Ferns and Leighlin)
- 1758 John Jago
- 1796 Richard Sleman
- 1812 Edward Atkyns Bray
- 1857 Osborne John Tancock
- 1872 William John Tait
- 1883 Daniel Pring Alford
- 1895 Henry Godfrey Le Neveu
- 1918 Hugh Leslie Bickersteth
- 1946 Basil Tudor Guy - 1956 (later Bishop of Gloucester)
- 1956 George Hodgshon
- 1966 Roy Wyndham Stevenson
- 1973 Richard Gilpin
- 1992 John Rawlings
- 2007 Michael Brierley (priest in charge)
- 2015 Christopher Hardwick
- 2022 Matt Godfrey

== Organ ==
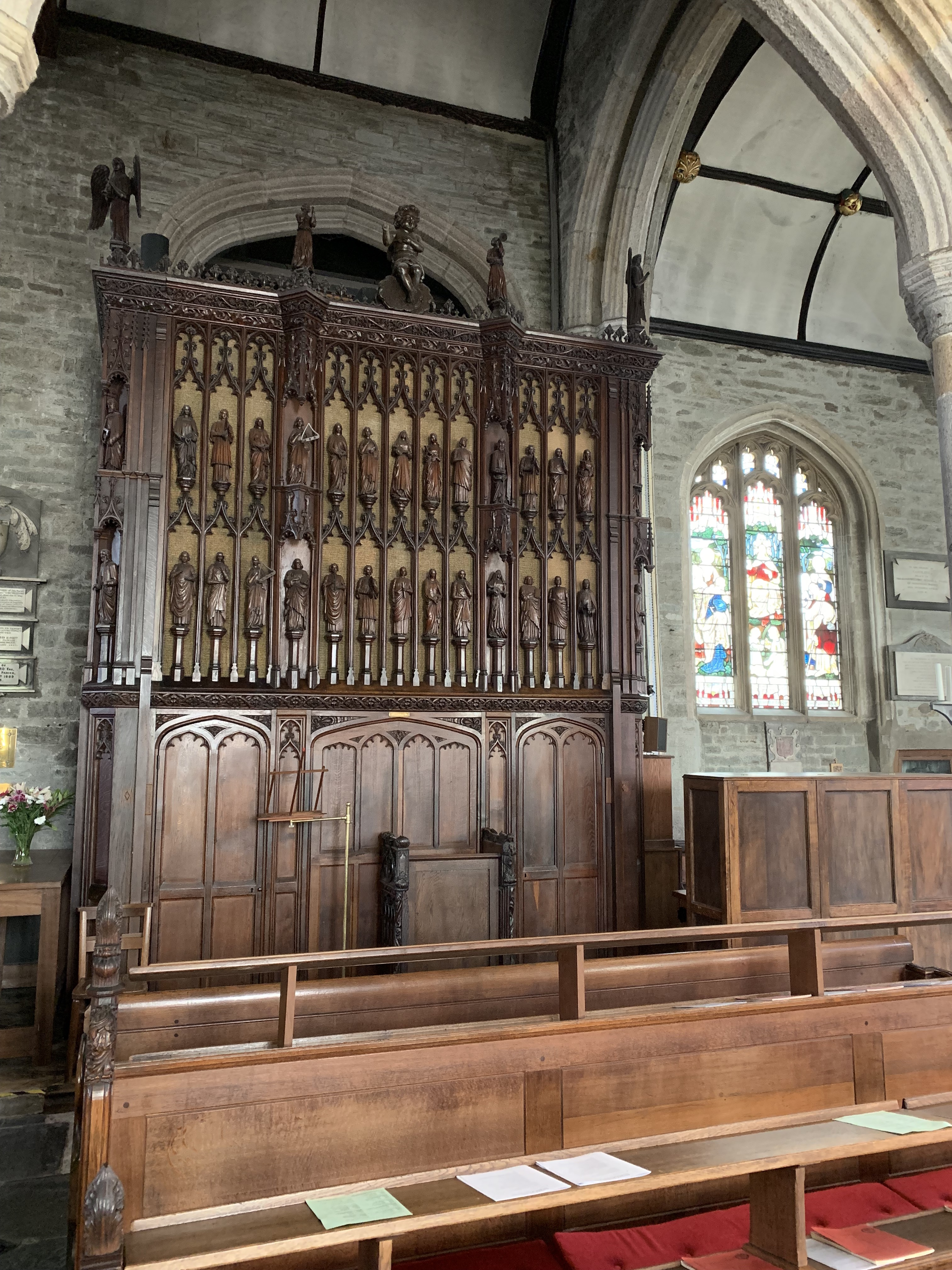
The organ case

The first mention of an organ is in 1538/9 when it was noted that repairs were needed. By the 1790s there was a barrel organ in a gallery. In 1802 this was replaced, and the 1802 organ was replaced in 1825.

The current organ was built by J.W. Walker and Sons. It was opened by Samuel Sebastian Wesley on 25 June 1846.

The carved statues on the organ case were added in 1879. There were later modifications and additions by Hele and Company of Plymouth and Lance Foy which has resulted in a three manual organ with 51 stops. A specification of the organ can be found in the National Pipe Organ Register.

=== Organists ===
Initially the salary of the organist was funded by the Duke of Bedford, but by 1875 the salary had reached £61 10s per annum (equivalent to £6,100 in 2025) and Francis Russell, 9th Duke of Bedford decided it was time for the congregation to fund it. At the time, the pew rents generated £120 per annum, with expenses of running the church at £118 per annum.

- Samuel Sebastian Wesley 1846
- John Frederick Thynne 1846 - 1877
- Alexander Luke Vingoe 1877 - 1878
- Charles John Vincent 1878 - 1883 (formerly organist of St Mark's Church, Sunderland, afterwards organist of Christ Church, Hampstead)
- John Tomlinson 1883 - 1906
- William Clotworthy 1907 - 1942 (formerly organist of St Mary Magdalene's Church, Launceston)
- Harold Charles Lake 1942 - 1956

== Bells ==
The tower contains a peal of 10 bells The eight bells of 1925 by John Taylor and Company of Loughborough were expanded to 10 in 1998 by the addition of two new bells by the same founder.
