= John Lydford =

English priest and canon lawyer

John Lydford (c.1337–1407) was an English priest and canon lawyer.

Lydford was Archdeacon of Totnes from 1385 until 1407.

Church of England titles
Preceded by Hugh de Bridham	Archdeacon of Totnes; 1385–1407	Succeeded by William Hunden
