= Pet door =

Flap door for pets

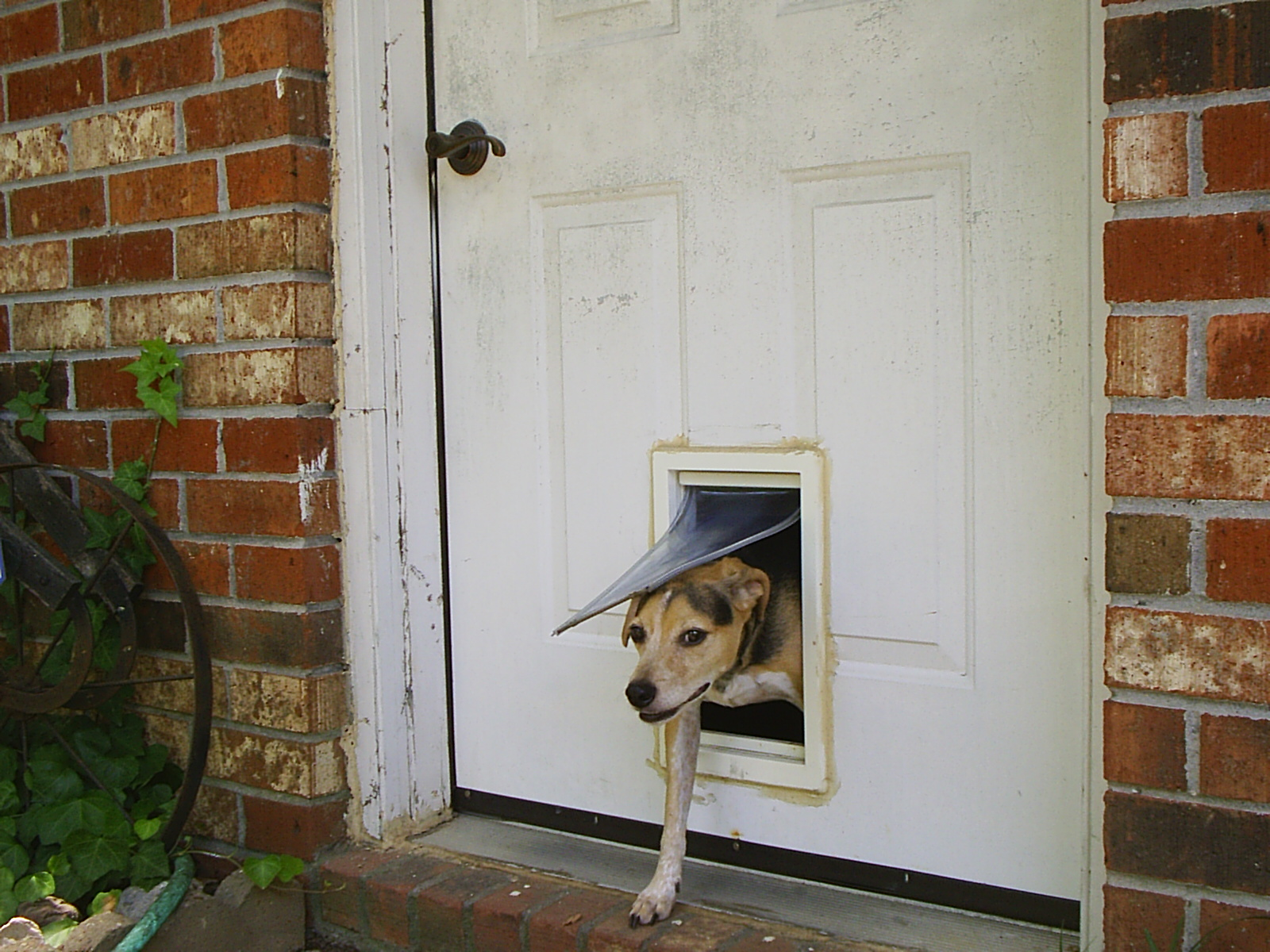
A dog exiting through a pet door

A pet door or pet flap (also referred to in more specific terms, such as cat flap, cat door, kitty door, dog flap, dog door, or doggy/doggie door) is a small opening to allow pets to enter and exit a building on their own without needing a human to open the door. Originally simple holes, the modern form is a hinged and often spring-loaded panel or flexible flap, and some are electronically controlled. They offer a degree of protection against wind, rain, and larger-bodied intruders entering the dwelling. Similar hatches can let dogs through fences at stiles. A related concept is the pet gate, which is easy for humans to open but acts as a secure pet barrier.

== Purpose ==
A pet door is found to be convenient by many owners of companion animals, especially dogs and cats, because it lets the pets come and go as they please, reducing the need for pet-owners to let or take the pet outside manually, and curtailing unwanted behaviour such as loud vocalisation to be let outside, scratching on doors or walls, and (especially in the case of dogs) excreting in the house. They also help to ensure that a pet left outdoors can safely get back into the house unattended, in the case of inclement weather.

== Features ==
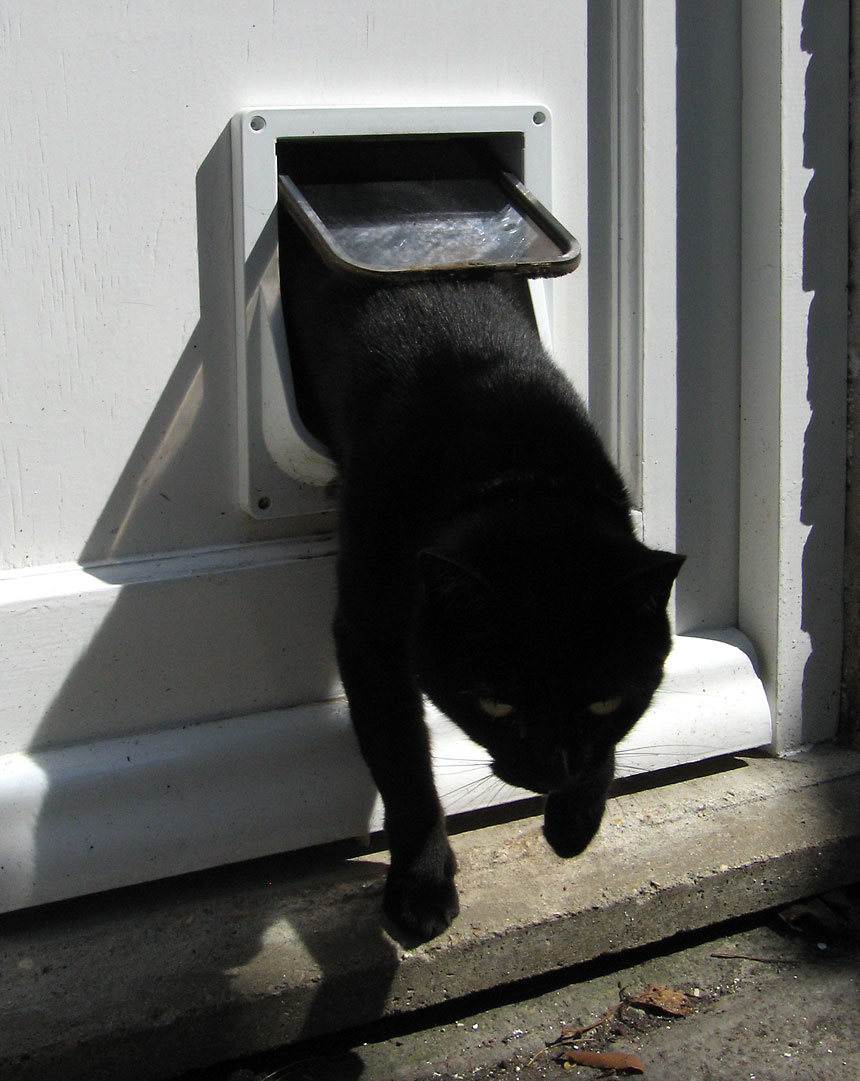
A cat flap in action

The simplest type are bottom-weighted flaps hung from the top of the opening, which swing shut on their own, but may be spring-aided to increase wind resistance. These flaps often feature magnets around the edges to help keep the door closed against weather and wind. Some pet doors, made of rigid materials, have side-mounted hinges and swing open like saloon doors, and usually have a spring or other contrivance to force their closure after the pet has gone through. Another door type, also rigid, may hinge at the top and simply rely on gravity to swing it down to where magnetism may engage to hold it properly closed. The rigid materials used are often made from plastic for the framing, and for a transparent door element, high density polystyrene, or better such as acrylics like plexiglass. The tolerances possible with rigid form allow fitting the door and frame with a low friction weather seal designed to block air flow without binding caused by friction around the sealing perimeter. This may be achieved with a synthetic material resembling a sparse high-piled velvet with fibers stiff and elastic enough to resist matting.

Another common feature is an adjustable catch to restrict the opening of the device to either one direction or the other; for example, to allow the pet to come in for the night, but not go out again until the owner releases the catch the next morning. Some pets, mostly cats with their retractile claws and flexible paws, learn to circumvent one-way pet doors, especially the "flap-within-flap" design.

Most also have a locking mechanism of some kind, and can be closed off by sliding a rigid plate into parallel rails on the left and right of the interior side of the pet door, useful during bad weather or when the owners are traveling with their pets.

Pet doors are generally designed to be safe for any type of pet. The panels are often designed with soft vinyl that does not trap or injure the animal. Cheap, easily replaceable pet doors are made from plastic and may not always be robust enough for large, boisterous pets.

Pet doors are most often fitted in a plywood or plastic paneled door, into which it is straightforward to cut a large round hole, but can also be fitted in brickwork or (if a sealed unit is obtained with the hole already provided) in a double glazed door. The latter is a relatively expensive option but may be the only alternative in some cases. Removable pet doors suitable for sliding glass doors are also available.

Innovation has contributed to a new generation of more expensive pet doors making use of specific materials, automation, time control devices, and/or sophisticated sensors to deal with common problems like poor insulation and drafts, higher noise levels, insufficient pet safety and access difficulties.

== History ==
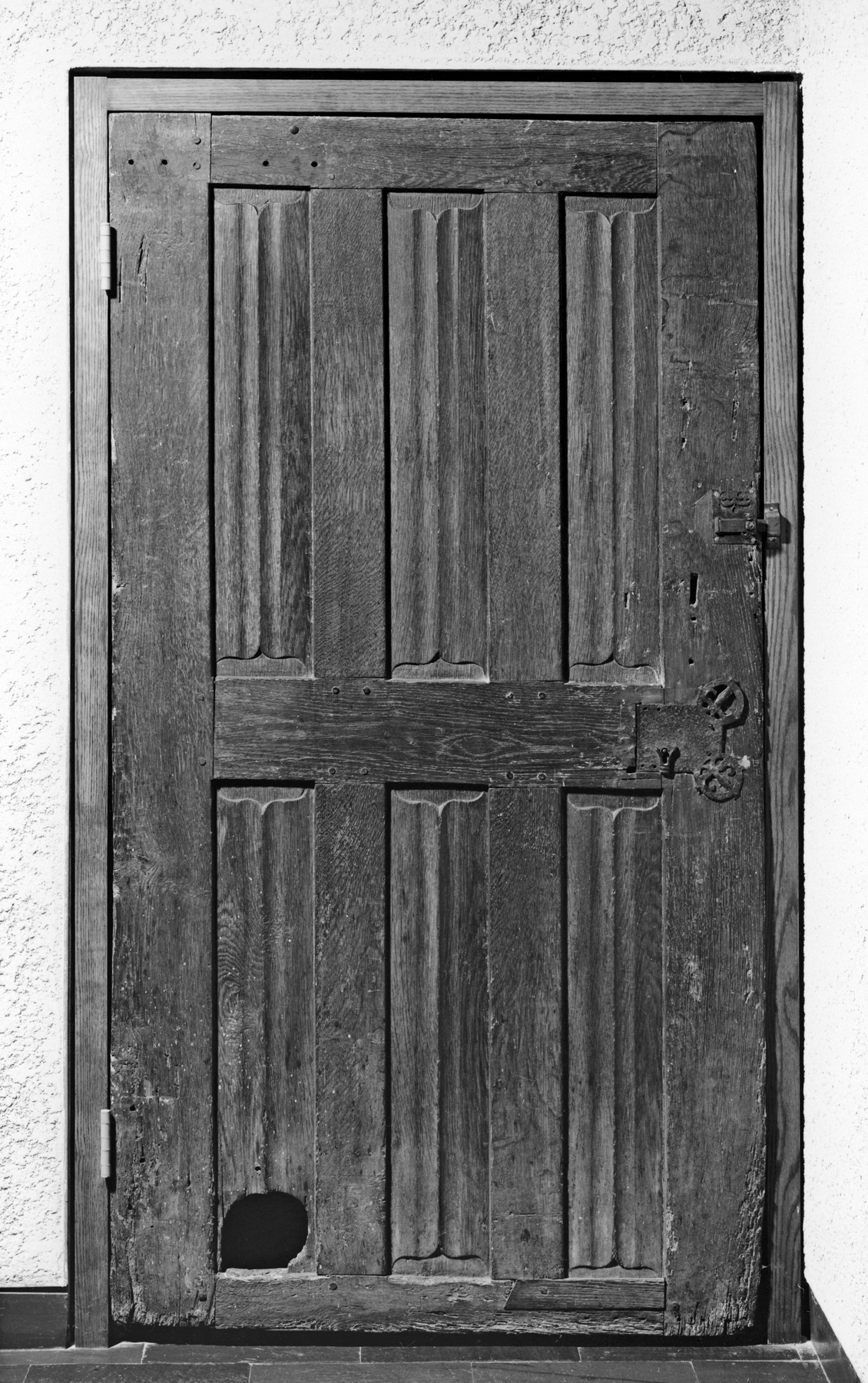
Door with Cat Hole (carved oak, Late Medieval period, 1450–1500, France, Walters Art Museum), like that mentioned by Chaucer.

The Oxford English Dictionary records the first use of the phrase "cat flap" in 1957 and "cat door" in 1959, but the idea is much older.

In rural areas, cat doors (often simple holes) in the walls, doors or even roofs of grain and flour storage spaces have long been used to welcome feral cats to hunt rodent pests that feed on these stores. Human semi-domestication of wildcats dates back to at least 7,500 BC in Cyprus, and the domestic cat was a part of everyday life in grain-dependent ancient Egypt (ca. 6,000 BC onward). In modern times, this function is mostly lost, but in some rural areas, such as Valencia, Spain, and Vaunage, France, farm cat doors and holes (Spanish: gateras, French: chatières) are still common.

The 14th-century English writer Geoffrey Chaucer described a simple cat hole in the "Miller's Tale" from his Canterbury Tales (late 14th century). In the narrative, a servant whose knocks go unanswered uses the cat door to peek in:

An hole he foond, ful lowe upon a bord
Ther as the cat was wont in for to crepe,
And at the hole he looked in ful depe,
And at the last he hadde of hym a sighte.

Exeter Cathedral is thought to have the oldest documented cat access hole, with records indicating a payment of eight pence made to the cathedral carpenters to cut a hole in the door to enable the cat of William Cotton, Bishop of Exeter 1598–1621 to catch rats and mice.

In an apparent early modern example of urban legend, the invention of the pet door was attributed to Isaac Newton (1642–1727) in a story (authored anonymously and published in a column of anecdotes in 1893) to the effect that Newton foolishly made a large hole for his adult cat and a small one for her kittens, not realizing the kittens could use the large hole as well. Two Newton biographers cite passages saying that Newton kept "neither cat nor dog in his chamber". Yet over 60 years earlier, a member of Newton's alma mater Trinity College, one J. M. F. Wright, reported this same story (from an unknown source) in his 1827 memoir, adding: "Whether this account be true or false, indisputably true is it that there are in the door to this day two plugged holes of the proper dimensions for the respective egresses of cat and kitten."

Modern cat flaps are popular in some countries, even in urban environments, particularly the United Kingdom where it is estimated that about 74% of cats have access to the outdoors.

Dog doors are common in suburban North America, where they mostly lead to fenced-in yards. Pet doors are also common between suburban homes and their attached garages, so that pet-related mess (cat box, dog food, etc.) can be kept in the garage with pets having free access.

== Electronic pet doors ==
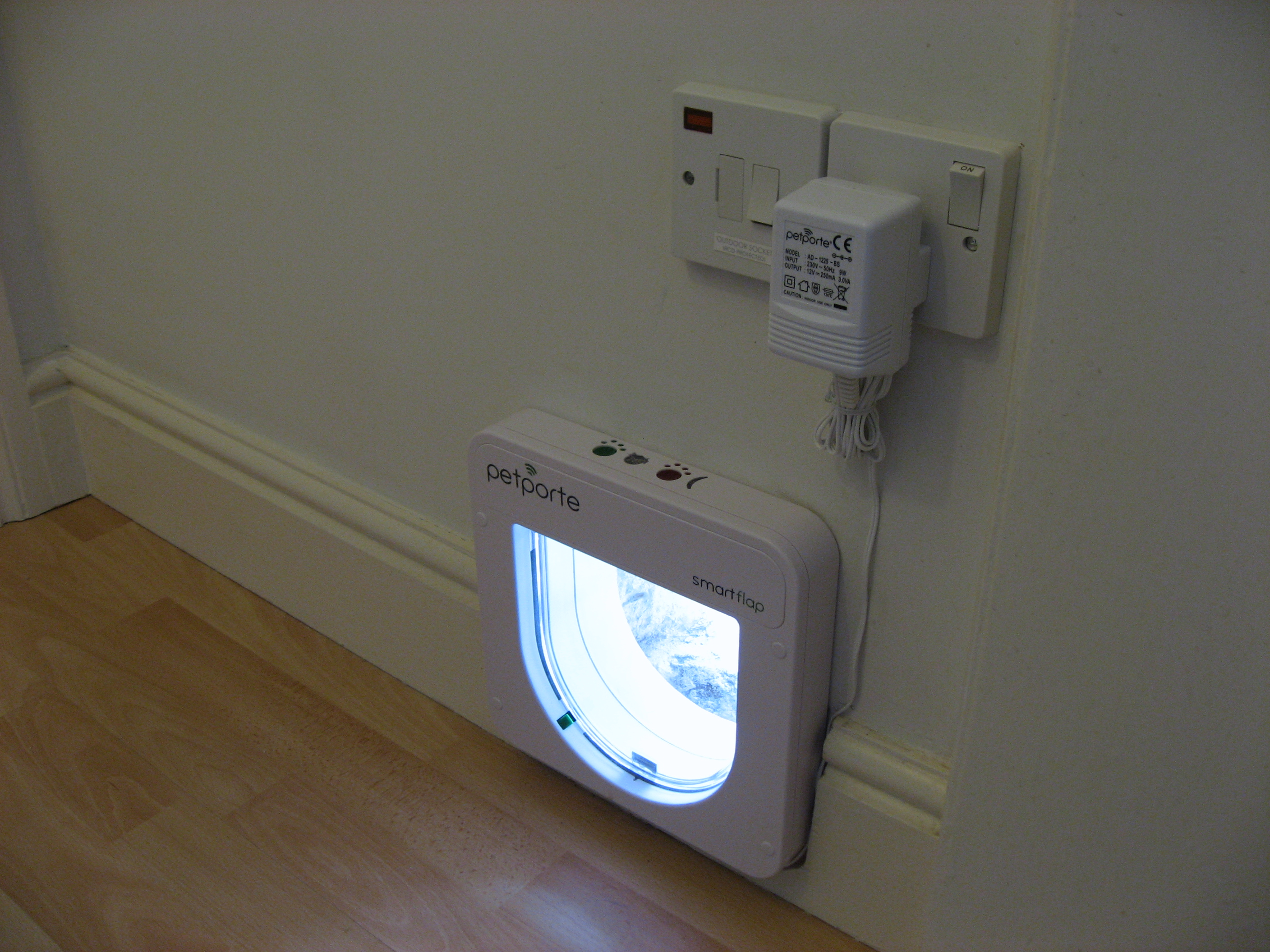
A microchip-enabled, selective-access cat and small dog door running through a wall

Several types of pet doors that allow selective access are available. The advantages of this type of pet door over simpler models are improved weather resistance, and home security against strays and other unwanted animals. Some use a permanent magnet mounted on the pet's collar to activate a matching electromagnetic mechanism that unlatches the door panel when the magnet comes within range; several pets can be fitted with collars that match the same door. Pet doors with infrared locks open only when a collar-mounted device transmits the correct code to the latch's receiver, allowing owners to have multiple flaps that different pets can use, e.g. a small cat flap to the back yard and a large dog door accessing a dog run. Either type can be used to selectively allow one pet outside access, while denying it to another (e.g., an ill animal that needs to stay indoors).

Some of the newest models use radio-frequency identification to electronically read a pet's microchip implant. This removes the need for a cat to wear a collar, which could become lost. Other high-end doors use a key with RFID. The key is attached to the pet's collar, and the electric door only opens for the assigned keys.

== Dog stiles ==
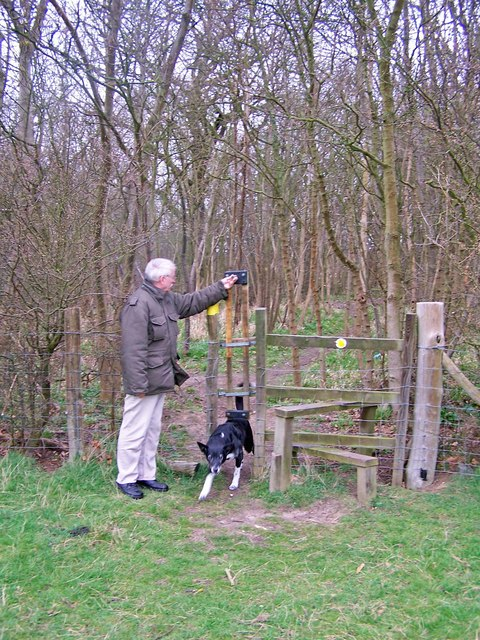
A man lets a dog through the lift-up hatch at a stile in Medway, England.

In England, Ireland, and other areas with large numbers of livestock fences and walls in areas through which people walk on footpaths, stiles often have wooden, lift-up dog hatchways next to them, because dogs are not good at climbing stile steps and are often too heavy to lift over a fence.

== Pet gates ==
A related idea to the pet door is the pet gate, an easily human-operated portal that keeps pets in (or out) and thwarts their attempts to open it by using a thumb-operated switch or a smooth door handle, and which is tall enough that it cannot be jumped over by the type of pet for which it was designed. Styles vary, but they are typically made of wooden or metal bars or a wire lattice, and have adjustable widths so that they can be used to span arbitrary entrances, hallways or windows. Common uses are to keep pets inside while ventilating a room by opening an unscreened door, or keeping pets out of a baby's room or a dining area.

== Pet barriers ==
Pet barriers are typically made of fabric and are especially used to secure staircases. They are available in banister-to-banister and wall-to-banister options and are customizable and portable.
