= Thomas de Hertford =

Thomas de Hertford was Archdeacon of Barnstaple until 1271 and also Archdeacon of Totnes from 1270 to 1275.
