= George Stapylton Barnes =

British barrister (1858–1946)

Barnes in 1921.

Sir George Stapylton Barnes, KCB, KCSI (8 February 1858 – 9 December 1946) was a British barrister and civil servant who served in the United Kingdom and in British India.

The son of George Carnac Barnes, Foreign Secretary of India, he spent much of his career at the Board of Trade, where he rose to Joint Permanent Secretary in 1915. He was a member of the Viceroy's Executive Council from 1916 until 1921.

A younger brother was Monsignor Arthur Stapylton Barnes.

His daughter Lucy Eleanor Barnes married Charles FitzRoy, 10th Duke of Grafton in 1924.
