= John Newhouse (priest) =

Robert John Darrell Newhouse (11 May 1911 – 27 November 2000) was an Anglican priest. He was the Archdeacon of Totnes from 1966 to 1976.

Newhouse was educated at Worcester College, Oxford, and ordained in 1945. He held curacies at St John's Peterborough and St Giles's Cambridge before World War II service with the RNVR. After the war he was Rector of Ashwater and Rural Dean of Holsworthy before becoming Vicar of Littleham-cum-Exmouth and Rural Dean of Aylesbeare before his archdeacon’s appointment.

Church of England titles
Preceded by John Hawkins	Archdeacon of Totnes; 1966–1976	Succeeded by John Lucas
