= Jasper Swift =

English clergyman

Jasper Swift (died 20 January 1620) was an English clergyman who served as the Archdeacon of Cornwall and Archdeacon of Totnes.

== Early life and education ==
Jasper Swift matriculated at Christ Church, Oxford in 1590/91 and graduated with a Bachelor of Arts degree in 1594. He later obtained a Master of Arts in 1599/1600, followed by a Bachelor of Divinity and a Doctor of Divinity in 1615/16.

== Ecclesiastical Career ==
Swift was ordained in the late 16th century and held multiple ecclesiastical positions throughout his career. He was appointed as:

- Rector of St. Erme, Cornwall in 1603,
- Rector of Powderham, Devon in 1612,
- Prebendary of Exeter Cathedral in 1613,
- Archdeacon of Cornwall from July to October 1616,
- Archdeacon of Totnes from October 1616 until his death in 1620.

== Death ==
Jasper Swift died on 20 January 1620. Some sources record his death as occurring in 1619/20 due to the transition from the Julian calendar to the Gregorian calendar.
