= Albert Seymour =

Albert Eden Seymour (8 October 1841 – 24 December 1908) was Archdeacon of Barnstaple from 1890 to 1908.

He was educated at Charterhouse and University College, Oxford. He was Vicar of Chittlehampton from 1890 to 1905; and of Ilfracombe from then until his death.

Church of England titles
Preceded by Herbert Barnes	Archdeacon of Barnstaple; 1890–1908	Succeeded by Robert Edward Trefusis
