= Richard Gilpin (priest) =

Richard Thomas Gilpin (25 July 1939 – 1 May 2016) was an Anglican priest who was Archdeacon of Totnes from 1996 to 2005.

He was ordained in 1964. After curacies at Whipton and Tavistock he was Vicar of Swimbridge. From 1973 he was Vicar of St Eustachius' Church, Tavistock with Gulworthy until 1992. He then became the Diocese of Exeter’s Director of Ordinands until his Archdeacon’s appointment.

Church of England titles
Preceded by Anthony Frank Tremlett	Archdeacon of Totnes; 1996–2005	Succeeded by John Edmund Frank Rawlings
