= William Cotton (archdeacon of Totnes) =

William Cotton was the Archdeacon of Totnes.

He was born in London, the son of William Cotton, who was archdeacon of Lewes and later Bishop of Exeter, and the brother of Edward Cotton. He was educated at Christ Church, Oxford, matriculating in 1597 or 1598, and graduating B.A. in 1602 and M.A. in 1605. He became vicar of Breage, Cornwall, canon of Exeter Cathedral in 1607, precentor of Exeter Cathedral in 1607, rector of Whimple in 1608, and rector of Silverton, Devon in 1613. He was collated archdeacon of Totnes in 1621, serving until 1622.

He married [settlement 23 Jul 1607] Elizabeth, daughter of John Hender, of Bottreaux Castle, Cornwall by his wife Jane Thorne. He was father of Edward, born around 1632. William made his will on 26 Apr 1652, and it was proved in London on October 28, 1656.
