= Robert Champeaux =

Robert de Champeaux was the abbot of Tavistock Abbey, Devon, England from April 1285 to 1325. He was known for his "piety and zeal for improvement" and has been described as probably "the greatest and wisest" of "the abbots in the later monastic period".

== Career ==
Abbot Robert's abbacy was long and regarded as prosperous, and he is known from several documents. He was well known for the largess of his gifts of alms to the poor of Devon and for providing a living for church workers in the district.

He was an avid builder of church buildings.

The Church of St Eustachius in Tavistock township was built in 1318 by Abbot Robert Champeaux as was the church of St Mary and St Rumon in the same year.

He also added to the Monastery itself.
