= Richard Hawkins (bishop) =

Bishop in the Church of England

The Right Reverend Richard Hawkins
- Bishop of Crediton
- Diocese: Diocese of Exeter
- In office: 1996–2004
- Predecessor: Peter Coleman
- Successor: Bob Evens
- Other posts: Honorary assistant bishop in Exeter (2005–present); Bishop of Plymouth (1988–1996); Archdeacon of Totnes (1981–1988)

Orders
- Ordination: c. 1963 (deacon); c. 1964 (priest)
- Consecration: 1988

Personal details
- Born: 2 April 1939 (age 87)
- Denomination: Anglican
- Parents: John Hawkins, Elsie Briggs
- Spouse: Valerie Herneman (m. 1966)
- Children: 2 sons (1 d.); 2 daughters (1 d.)
- Education: Exeter College, Oxford

Richard Stephen Hawkins (born 2 April 1939) is a bishop in the Church of England and currently a chapter canon of Exeter Cathedral.

Hawkins was educated at Exeter College, Oxford, and trained for ordination at St Stephen's House, Oxford. He was a team vicar in rural Devon and Exeter in his early ministry. He was then Archdeacon of Totnes before being ordained to the episcopate as the suffragan Bishop of Plymouth in the Diocese of Exeter. He was later translated to Crediton in the same diocese.

Hawkins' father, John Hawkins, was the Archdeacon of Totnes from 1962 until his death in 1965.

Church of England titles
Preceded by John Lucas	Archdeacon of Totnes; 1981–1988	Succeeded by Tony Tremlett
Preceded by Kenneth Newing	Bishop of Plymouth; 1988–1996	Succeeded by John Garton
Preceded by Peter Coleman	Bishop of Crediton; 1996–2004	Succeeded by Bob Evens
