= Arthur Simms =

Arthur Hennell Simms, MA (1853–1921) was an Anglican priest and the Archdeacon of Totnes from 1910 until his death.

He was educated at Trinity College, Cambridge. He served curacies at Lifton and Clifton and incumbencies at Churchstow, Wolborough, Cambridge, Ely and Torquay until his years as an archdeacon.

== Notes ==
Church of England titles
Preceded by Charles Thomas Wilkinson	Archdeacon of Totnes; 1910–1921	Succeeded by Thomas Newton Leeke
