= Thomas de Bodham =

Archdeacon of Totnes

Thomas de Bodham was Archdeacon of Totnes during 1285. In 1284 Henry de Bollegh, Archdeacon of Cornwall, leased to Bodham his own tenement on St John's Hospital in Exeter.
