= Thomas Salmon (bishop) =

Irish Anglican bishop

Thomas Salmon, DD (1715?–1759) was an 18th-century Anglican bishop in Ireland.

Salmon was educated at St Paul's School, London, and matriculated at Trinity College, Cambridge in 1732, aged 17. He graduated B.A. in 1736, M.A. in 1739, and LL.D. in 1749. He was vicar of St Eustachius' Church, Tavistock, and Whitchurch, and was chaplain to the Duke of Bedford.

Salmon was nominated to the See of Ferns and Leighlin on 30 May 1758 and consecrated on 11 June that year. He died at Tiverton on 19 March 1759.

Religious titles
Preceded by William Carmichael	Bishop of Ferns and Leighlin; 1758–1759	Succeeded by Richard Robinson
