= William Wagott =

William Wagott was Archdeacon of Totnes during 1482.
