= John Hawkins (archdeacon of Totnes) =

John Stanley Hawkins (30 June 1903 – 23 August 1965) was an Anglican priest: the Archdeacon of Totnes from 1962 until his death.

He was educated at St Chad's College and ordained in 1933. He began his career as a Curate at St Stephen's, Liverpool, after which he was Rector of Dalwallinu then South Perth, Western Australia. During World War II he was a chaplain in the RAAF. Returning to England he was a Curate at Wolborough then Vicar of Withycombe Raleigh.

His son Richard became Bishop of Crediton.

Church of England titles
| Preceded by Edgar Hall | Archdeacon of Totnes; 1962–1965 | Succeeded by Robert Newhouse |
