= Charles Wilkinson (priest) =

The Ven. Charles Thomas Wilkinson, DD (19 March 1823 – 14 July 1910) was an Anglican priest: the Archdeacon of Totnes from 1888 until his death.

He was educated at Trinity College, Dublin. He was Curate in charge of Trinity Church, Hinckley from 1846 to 1849 and then Perpetual curate at Attercliffe. After this he was Rector of St Thomas's, Birmingham then Vicar of St Andrew's, Plymouth.

An Honorary Chaplain to the Queen, he died on 14 July 1910. He had married Louise, widow of William Phillipps of Leigham Villas, Plymouth and daughter of Edmund Rich of Willesley, Wiltshire.

== Notes ==
Church of England titles
Preceded by Alfred Earle	Archdeacon of Totnes; 1823–1910	Succeeded by Arthur Hennell Simms
