= Arthur Barnes (monsignor) =

English Catholic prelate and scholar (1861–1936)

Arthur Stapylton Barnes (31 May 1861 – 13 November 1936) was an English Catholic prelate, scholar and controversialist. Prior to converting to Rome in 1895, he was an Anglican priest. He was the first priest to be Catholic chaplain at both Cambridge and Oxford Universities.

== Early life ==
Barnes was born, posthumously, in 1861, in Kussowlie, British India, to George Carnac Barnes (1818-1861), the Foreign Secretary to the Government of India, and Margaret Diana Chetwynd Barnes (née Stapylton) (1829-1927). An older brother was Sir George Stapylton Barnes, who was Permanent Secretary of the Board of Trade, 1915-1916, (the father of Lucy, second wife of Charles FitzRoy, 10th Duke of Grafton), and an older sister was Margaret Louisa Stapylton Barnes, who married an Anglican clergyman, the Rev Neville Usher.

He was educated at Eton. He then held a commission in the Royal Artillery from 1879 to 1880, and was the youngest officer in the British Army at the time. After resigning his commission, he went to University College, Oxford (BA 1883, MA 1887).

== Anglican clerical career ==
Barnes was ordained in 1889 and, to the surprise of his contemporaries, became an advanced Anglo-Catholic. All of his Anglican appointments were at notable Anglo-Catholic churches, commencing with a curacy at St Agnes, Kennington Park in 1889, the congregation of which had decamped from St Paul's, Lorrimore Square when an unsympathetic clergyman was appointed as Vicar in 1880. He was then Vicar of All Saints, St Ives from 1891 to 1894. The screen with organ case and rood at All Saints is the work of Sir Ninian Comper, and was the gift of Barnes in memory of his father. A contemporary at both Eton and Oxford was Viscount Cranborne (later the 4th Marquess of Salisbury); the patronage of the Hospital Chapel of St Mary, Ilford was held by Cranborne's father, the Marquess of Salisbury (Prime Minister 1885-1886, 1886-1892 and 1895-1902), and in 1894 Barnes was appointed Warden. Barnes caused what even the Anglo-Catholic Church Times described as "some sensation" by introducing a life-size statue of the Blessed Virgin Mary into the chapel. In 1895 he left Ilford for a holiday and, to the surprise of the congregation, never returned.

== Conversion to Rome and Roman Catholic clerical career ==
In 1896 Pope Leo XIII issued his papal bull Apostolicae curae, declaring Anglican orders "absolutely null and utterly void". The process which led to the publication of the bull had begun in 1890 when Viscount Halifax and the Abbé Fernand Portal had met on the island of Madeira. In advance of publication of the bull, in 1895 Barnes, convinced by then of the defective nature of Anglican orders, converted to Rome, being received by Cardinal Rafael Merry del Val and taking his first communion at the hands of Leo XIII. Initially seeking to become a Benedictine monk, he was instead ordained deacon in 1897 and priest in 1898. He was Roman Catholic Chaplain at Cambridge University from 1902 to 1918. He was a Temporary Roman Catholic Chaplain to the Forces 1915-1917 and a Foreign Office envoy to the United States 1917-1918.

In 1904 Pius X made Barnes a Privy Chamberlain, and in 1919 Benedict XV made him a Domestic Prelate. He was the leading Catholic archaeologist, and spent much time investigating the burial sites of Sts Peter and Paul.

He was Roman Catholic Chaplain at Oxford University 1918-1926. Barnes was known as "Mugger" at Oxford, and was the model for Monsignor Bell in Evelyn Waugh’s 1945 novel Brideshead Revisited. He was responsible for the conversion of the Old Palace in 1920 into the Catholic Chaplaincy. He retired from Oxford at the age of 65, and was succeeded by the eminent theologian, Monsignor Ronald Knox.

In 1931, Miss Alice Howard (daughter of Sir Henry Howard, appointed British envoy to the Vatican City in 1914, the first such appointment since 1558) purchased a property in Painswick, for conversion into a Catholic church. It was not until 1934 that the church was ready for mass to be said, and in August of that year it was dedicated to Our Lady and St Therese of Lisieux. In October 1934 Barnes was appointed resident priest, and moved into a flat in the village.

== Works ==
Barnes was the author of numerous books, mostly of a theological nature, and those were of a controversialist, exhibiting conspicuous anti-Anglican bias. A notable work was his 1922 book on Bishop Barlow and Anglican Orders, whereby he attempted to demonstrate that Bishop Barlow had not been validly consecrated as a bishop, and thereby rendering the Anglican succession invalid. This was firmly rebuffed by Canon Claude Jenkins, the librarian at Lambeth Palace, who had the relevant documents within his control, in a lengthy review article in The Journal of Theological Studies.

Barnes attended the exposition of the Shroud of Turin in 1931, the first time it had been exhibited since 1898. He also attended the exposition in 1933, on the 1900th anniversary of the Crucifixion, and this resulted in the publication of his work The Holy Shroud of Turin in 1934.

A notable non-religious work was The Man of the Mask, published in 1908, in which Barnes identified the Man in the Iron Mask as James de la Cloche, the putative illegitimate son of Charles II.

- The English Liturgical Colours and recent writings thereon, (1890: Church Printing Co).
- The Popes and the Ordinal, (1896: Robert Browning).
- Eton in the Olden Days, (1898: Robert Browning).
- St. Peter in Rome, and his Tomb on the Vatican Hill, (1900: Swan Sonnenschein).
- Low Mass in England before the Reformation, (1905: Robert Browning).
- The Man of the Mask, (1908: Smith, Elder).
- Blessed Joan the Maid, (1909: Burns & Oates).
- The Early Church in the Light of the Monuments: A Study in Christian Archaeology, (1913: Longmans & Co).
- Bishop Barlow and Anglican Orders: A Study of the Original Documents, (1922: Longmans).
- The Catholic Schools of England, (1926: Williams and Norgate).
- Catholic Oxford, (1933: Catholic Truth Society).
- No Sacrifice, No Priest, (1933: Catholic Truth Society).
- The Holy Shroud of Turin, (1934: Burns Oates & Washbourne).
- The Martyrdom of Peter and Paul, (1933: OUP).
- Christianity at Rome in the Apostolic Age: An attempt at reconstruction of history, (1938: Methuen).

== Death and legacy ==
Barnes died at his home in Painswick, Gloucestershire, in 1936, aged 75, from a coronary thrombosis, and was buried at Prinknash Abbey.
