= William Barton (priest) =

Archdeacon of Totnes

William Barton was Archdeacon of Totnes from 1415 until 1421.

Church of England titles
Preceded by William Hunden	Archdeacon of Totnes; 1415–1421	Succeeded by John Typhane
