= Peter de Gildesburgh =

Peter de Gildesburgh was the Archdeacon of Totnes from 1338 until 1349 .

Church of England titles
Preceded by Roger de Charlton	Archdeacon of Totnes; 1338–1349	Succeeded by William Steele
