= Francis Fullwood =

Archdeacon of Totnes from 1660 to 1693

Francis Fullwood (died 1693) was the Archdeacon of Totnes from 1660.

He was educated at Charterhouse School, and was admitted to Emmanuel College, Cambridge in 1644. where he graduated B.A. in 1647.

== Works ==
Fullwood was a controversialist, who published 20 works.

A book published in 1690 entitled Reflection, in Vindication of One Arch-Deacon (and Consequently of All) from the Scurrilous and Groundless Invectives Against Him referred to him.
