= Edward Cotton (priest, died 1647) =

Edward Cotton (died 8 October 1647) was the Archdeacon of Totnes from 1622.

He was born the son of William Cotton, bishop of Exeter and brother of William Cotton. He studied at Christ Church, Oxford, matriculating 1606-7 and graduating B.A. in 1609 and M.A. in 1612. He entered the Middle Temple in 1606.

He served as rector of Duloe, Cornwall, 1611 (until sequestered 1 May 1647), and of St. Peter Tavy in 1611, becoming canon of Exeter Cathedral in 1611 and chancellor in 1613. He was also rector of Bridestowe in 1614 and of Shobroke, Devon in 1615, being collated archdeacon of Totnes in 1622.

He died on 8 October 1647.
