= Tickenhill Palace =

Building in Bewdley, Worcestershire, England

Coordinates: 52.3734°N 2.3176°W

Tickenhill Palace (also known as Tickenhill House or Tickenhall Manor) is a historic building in Bewdley, Worcestershire, England. It is a grade II* listed building. The palace served as the mediaeval council house of the Lords President of the Marches of Wales. It also served as a royal residence.

The park which surrounds the manor house was established in the 14th century. As a Tudor palace, it was the site of the marriage by proxy of Arthur, Prince of Wales to Catherine of Aragon in 1499. Princess Mary came to Tickenhill for New Year 1526. Improvements to the house were made for her by her treasurer, Richard Sydnor.

In the reign of Edward VI the estate was leased to Lord Seymour of Sudeley. The house was used by the Council of the Marches, and Henry Sidney organised repairs. Tickenhill was the birthplace of the poet Mary Sidney.

The palace was remodelled in 1738 and eventually served as a 'general promenade' for the public by the early 19th century. Dendrochronological dating shows that some timbers from the 1460s remain in-situ.
