= William de Pembroke =

William de Pembroke was Archdeacon of Totnes in England during 1263.
