= Newton Leeke =

Thomas Newton Leeke (17 January 1854 – 26 October 1933) was an Anglican priest. He was the Archdeacon of Totnes from 1921 until his death.

Leeke was educated at Harrow School, Trinity College, Cambridge and Wells Theological College. His first posts were curacies at Keele and Alcester. He was Rector of Longford from 1880 to 1883, Vicar of Inkberrow from 1893 to 1896 and Rector of Bideford until 1921, also He was Rural Dean of Hartland from 1914 until his years as Archdeacon.

== Notes ==
Church of England titles
Preceded by Arthur Hennell Simms	Archdeacon of Totnes; 1921–1933	Succeeded by John Lawrence Cobham
