= John de Bridport =

Archdeacon of Totnes

John de Bridport was the Archdeacon of Totnes during 1207.
