= Thomas de Boues =

Thomas de Boues was Archdeacon of Totnes during 1215.
