= Bernard (Archdeacon of Totnes) =

Bernard was the sixth Archdeacon of Totnes, holding that office at some time between 1165 and 1184.
