= Thomas Pincerna =

Thomas Pincerna, also known as Thomas Butler, was Archdeacon of Totnes from 1238 to 1254.
