= St George's Church, Kidderminster =

Coordinates: 52°23′25.08″N 2°14′33″W

St George’s Church, Kidderminser
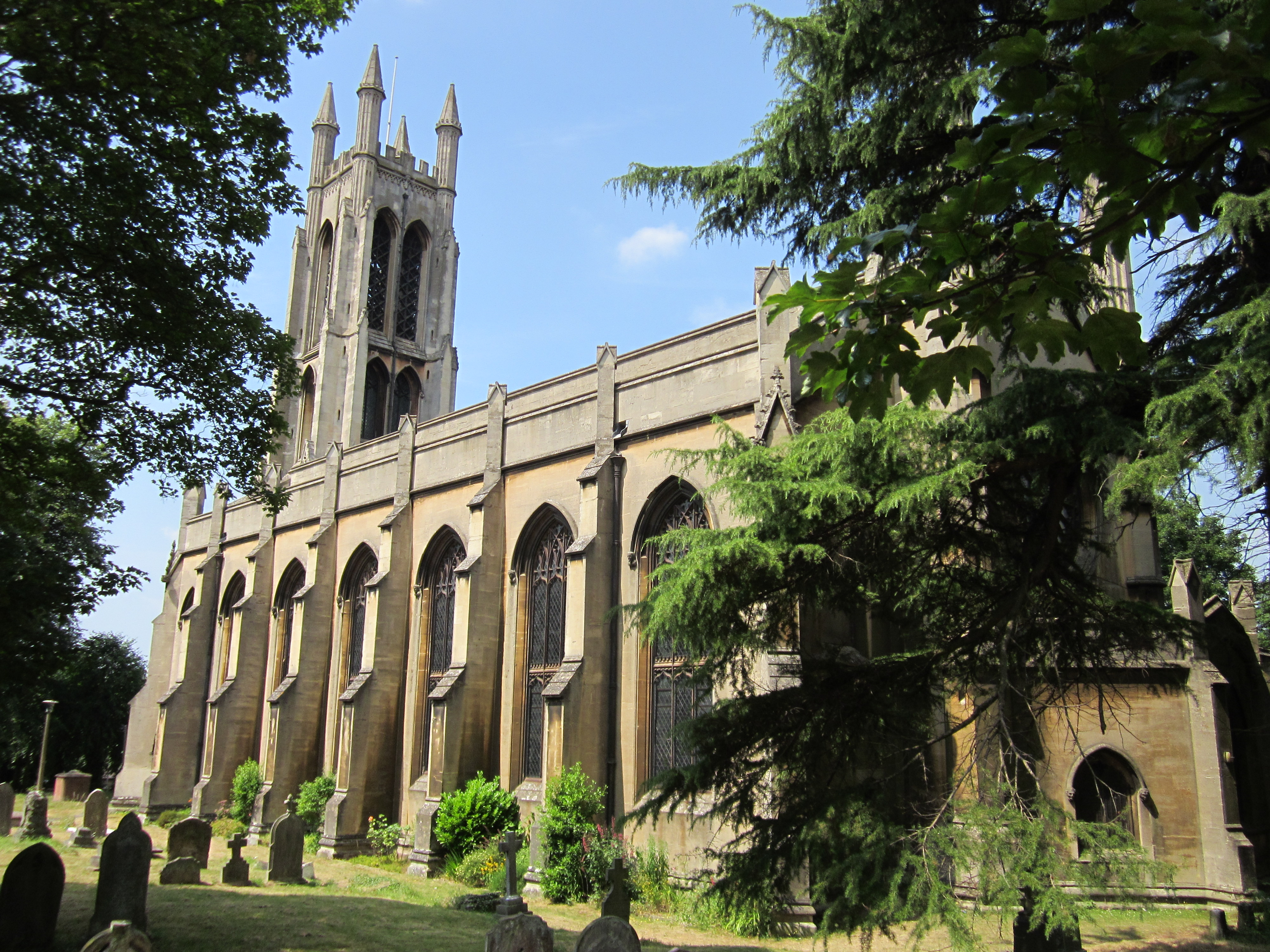
- The Church of St George, Kidderminster
- St George’s Church, Kidderminser
- Location: Kidderminster
- Country: England
- Denomination: Church of England

History
- Dedication: St George

Architecture
- Heritage designation: Grade II* listed
- Architect: Francis Goodwin
- Architectural type: Perpendicular Gothic
- Completed: 24 October 1824

Specifications
- Materials: Bath stone

Administration
- Diocese: Diocese of Worcester
- Archdeaconry: Archdeaconry of Dudley
- Deanery: Kidderminster Deanery
- Parish: Kidderminster East Team Ministry

St George's Church, Kidderminster is a Church of England parish church in Kidderminster, Worcestershire, England. The church is a Grade II* listed building.

== History ==
St George’s Church was a Commissioners' church designed by architect Francis Goodwin. Its grant of just over £17,000 (equivalent to £1,613,700 in 2025), was the third-largest given by the commission to any church outside London. It opened in 1824.

A fire which originated in the belfry destroyed the interior of the church on 20 November 1922 and it was restored by Giles Gilbert Scott.

=== Incumbents ===
- William Villiers 1824 - 1842
- John Downall 1842 - 1847
- Thomas Baker Morrell 1847 - 1852
- Charles John McQueen Mottram 1852 - 1872
- Frederic Rawlins Evans 1872 - 1876
- Stephen Brown Bathe 1876 - 1887
- Theobald W. Church 1887 - 1915
- Albert Edward Riland Bedford 1915 - 1918
- Robert Hume Stephen 1918 - 1932
- Benjamin John Isaacs 1932 - 1940
- P.J. Martin 1940 - 1959
- Canon L.W. Chidzey 1959 - 1968
- H. Edward Montague-Youens from 1969 - 1972
- Peter D. Chippendale 1972 - 1976
- Andrew John Piggott until 1994
- Canon Nick Barker until 2007
- David Hildred from 2020

== Organ ==
The church obtained a pipe organ in 1828 by Elliot and Hill. In 1869 this was rebuilt by Hill but was destroyed in the fire of 1922. In 1929 a new organ was installed by G.H.C. Foskett. The organ currently comprises 3 manuals and pedals with 45 speaking stops. A specification of the organ can be found on the National Pipe Organ Register.

=== Organists ===
- C.S. Herve 1836 - 1837
- Charles Baldwin from 1837
- W. White ca. 1841
- James Fitzgerald 1850 - 1895 (formerly assistant organist at Bristol Cathedral, from 1850 to 1868 also choirmaster at St Mary’s)
- Frank Thornton 1896 - 1900 (formerly organist at St Cuthbert’s Church, Birmingham)
- C. Milton Bill from1900 (formerly organist at Newport Parish Church, Isle of Wight)
- Richard Alfred Taylor
- Harold Evers ca. 1941 until 1976
- Tim Morris from 1976
