= Robert Froude =

Archdeacon of Totnes in Devon

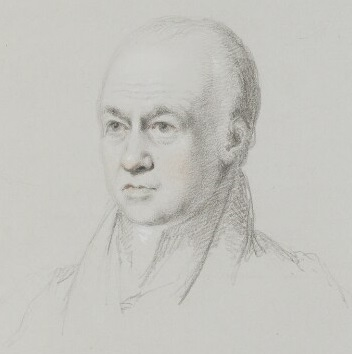
Portrait by William Brockedon (1832), National Portrait Gallery, London

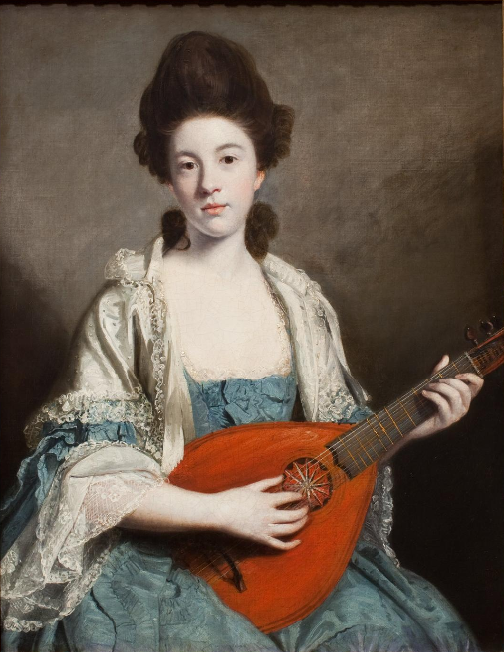
Portrait of Froude's mother, Phillis Hurrell, painted in 1762 by Sir Joshua Reynolds. Minneapolis Institute of Art

Robert Hurrell Froude (1771–1859) was an English Anglican priest, Archdeacon of Totnes in Devon, from 1820 to 1859. From 1799 to his death he was rector of Denbury and of Dartington in Devon.

== Origins ==
Froude was born at Wakeham Farm in the parish of Aveton Gifford near Modbury in Devon, the posthumous son of Robert Froude (1741–1770) of Modbury, by his wife Phillis Hurrell (1746-1826) of Aveton Gifford, whose portrait was painted by Sir Joshua Reynolds in 1762, four years before her marriage. The Froude family is first recorded in surviving records at Kingston, South Hams, Devon, in the 16th century. Robert Froude (1741-1770) was the third son of John Froude, from whom he inherited the estates of Edmeston and Gutsford, both in the parish of Modbury in Devon. He was the patron of Molland-cum-Knowstone in Devon in 1767, and was buried at Aveton Gifford in Devon. Phillis Hurrell (1746-1826) was a daughter of Richard Hurrell, Gentleman, of Modbury, by his wife Phillis Collings, whom he married in 1746. In 1767 Robert Froude, as patron, appointed John Froude I as Vicar of Molland-cum-Knowstone, who was followed in 1804 by his son Rev John Froude II (1777-1852), Vicar of Molland-cum-Knowstone, an extreme example of the "hunting parson".

== Career ==
Froude matriculated at Oriel College, Oxford, in 1788, graduating B.A. in 1792, and M.A. in 1795. He was rector of Denbury when he assumed his new parish at Dartington in 1799.

His marriage to Margaret Spedding produced eight children, who included Richard Hurrell Froude who was involved in the formation of the Oxford Movement; the railway engineer and acclaimed hydrodynamicist William Froude and the historian James Anthony Froude. A graduate of Oriel College, Oxford, for many years he was the Rector of Dartington . and Denbury. He died on 16 February 1859.

Church of England titles
Preceded by Ralph Barnes	Archdeacon of Totnes; 1820–1859	Succeeded by John Downall
