= William Hunden =

William Hunden was Archdeacon of Totnes from 1408 until 1415.

Church of England titles
Preceded by John Lydford	Archdeacon of Totnes; 1408–1415	Succeeded by William Barton
