= Thomas Skynner =

Thomas Skynner (born Great Milton 6 June 1728; died Pinhoe 7 August 1789) was the Archdeacon of Totnes from 1772 until 1775.

Skynner was born in Great Milton and educated at Christ Church, Oxford. He was appointed a prebendary of Exeter Cathedral in 1768; Canon in 1769; and Precentor in 1775. He was Rector of Bratton Clovelly and Vicar of Pinhoe in 1781.

Church of England titles
Preceded by George Baker	Archdeacon of Totnes; 1772–1775	Succeeded by Ralph Barnes
