= Richard Sydnor =

Archdeacon of Totnes

Richard Sydnor or Sydenor (died 1534) was the Receiver and Steward of Bishop Oldham of Exeter Cathedral from 10 Henry VII (1505) to 5 Henry VIII (1514) - see Exeter Cathedral MS. 3690.

He was Archdeacon of Cornwall in 1515 and then Archdeacon of Totnes from 1515 to 1534.

In 1519 he was appointed Canon of the tenth stall at St George's Chapel, Windsor Castle, a position he held until 1534.

Sydnor was an official in the household of Princess Mary from 1518. Richard Pace was asked to write to Sydnor in July 1518 concerning Mary's movements during a plague scare. His financial account gives some illustrations of Mary's early life. He was receiver or treasurer of the household of Princess Mary in the 1520s, officially the surveyor of her lands he is also described as her cofferer. and was accountant of repairs made at Tickenhill Manor and Ludlow Castle.

A member of Magdalen College, Oxford and the University of Orléans, he was rector of Witney in Oxfordshire from 1519 where his arms were included in a stained glass window. Sydnor died in April 1534 and was buried at St George's Chapel, Windsor Castle.

Church of England titles
Preceded by John Fulford	Archdeacon of Totnes; 1515–1534	Succeeded by George Carew
