= Edgar Hall =

Anglican archdeacon (1888–1987)

Edgar Francis Hall (14 August 1888 – 9 February 1987) was an Anglican priest: the Archdeacon of Totnes from 1948 until 1962.

He was educated at Jesus College, Oxford, and ordained in 1915. He was a Curate of St James’, Exeter, then Vicar of Leusden. He was the Chairman of the Church of England Council for Education from 1949 to 1958.

Church of England titles
Preceded by John Lawrence Cobham	Archdeacon of Totnes; 1948–1962	Succeeded by John Hawkins
