= Patrick Haliburton =

Archdeacon of Totnes

Patrick Haliburton was the first Archdeacon of Totnes.
