= Bob Evens =

English Anglican bishop (born 1947)

The Right Reverend Bob Evens
- Former Bishop of Crediton
- Church: Church of England
- Diocese: Diocese of Exeter
- Installed: 5 December 2004
- Term ended: 31 October 2012 (retired)
- Predecessor: Richard Hawkins

Orders
- Consecration: 30 November 2004

Personal details
- Born: Robert John Scott Evens; 29 May 1947 (age 79) Plymouth, England
- Denomination: Anglican
- Spouse: Sue (c1972—)
- Children: 2 adult children
- Profession: formerly banker
- Education: Trinity College, Bristol

Robert John Scott Evens (known as Bob; born 29 May 1947) is an English Anglican bishop, the former suffragan Bishop of Crediton in the Diocese of Exeter.

== Biography ==
Evens was born in post-war Plymouth, where he lived until he was six. His father joined up with the Devonshire Regiment at the beginning of the second World War and then entered banking once the war was ended. His career meant a number of moves for the Evens family, including a period in Exeter, where Robert attended Hele's School, and a later move to Ilfracombe. He became an Associate of the Institute of Bankers (ACIB) and gained a Diploma in Theology (DipTh).

Evens followed his father into banking, working at National Westminster in Barnstaple and later in Bristol and Bath, before training for ordination to the priesthood. He was ordained deacon in 1977 and priest in 1978. Evens was previously Archdeacon of Bath in the Diocese of Bath and Wells from 1996 until his consecration to the episcopacy. Bob was consecrated bishop at Westminster Abbey on 30 November 2004 and installed as Bishop of Crediton on 5 December 2004 at Exeter Cathedral; he retired on 31 October 2012.

== Styles ==
- The Reverend Bob Evens (1977–1996)
- The Venerable Bob Evens (1996–2004)
- The Right Reverend Bob Evens (2004–present)

Church of England titles
Preceded by Richard Hawkins	Bishop of Crediton; 2004–2012	Succeeded by Nick McKinnel
