= John Typhane =

John Typhane was Archdeacon of Totnes from 1421 until 1433.

Church of England titles
Preceded by William Barton	Archdeacon of Totnes; 1421–1433	Succeeded by Alan Kirketon
