= George Baker (archdeacon of Totnes) =

George Baker (1687–1772) was the Archdeacon of Totnes from 1740 until 1772.

He was the son of Aaron Baker (born 1652), Rector of Alvingham. George became vicar of Modbury, Devon. He married Mary, the daughter of Stephen Weston, Bishop of Exeter. Their son George became a physician and later a baronet.

Church of England titles
Preceded by Nicholas Kendall	Archdeacon of Totnes; 1740–1772	Succeeded by Thomas Skynner
