= Thomas Baker Morrell =

British Episcopalian minister (1815-1877)

Thomas Baker Morrell FRSE (4 September 1815 – 15 November 1877) was a British Episcopalian minister who served as Bishop of Edinburgh.

== Life ==
He was born in 1815, the fifth son of Baker Morrell (1779–1854) of Oxford and his wife, Mary Elizabeth Chapman, daughter of Rev Joseph Chapman. He studied divinity at Oxford University, graduating BA in 1836 and MA in 1839.

He went to Chester as a deacon in 1839 and became a priest the following year. In 1840 he moved back to Oxford as a curate and in 1847 went to St George's Church, Kidderminster. In 1852 he became rector of Henley-on-Thames. On Candlemas 1863 (2 February), he was consecrated a bishop by Robert Eden, Bishop of Moray and Ross and Primus of the Scottish Episcopal Church, at St Paul's, Edinburgh, to serve as bishop coadjutor of the Diocese of Edinburgh, to assist Charles Terrot, Bishop of Edinburgh. Morrell did not seek election to the diocesan See upon Terrot's retirement in 1869, but resigned his own bishopric the same year. This may have been because he had been arrested, convicted and then acquitted that year in Nuremberg for a sexual encounter on Haller Meadow with two teenage boys.

In 1865 he was elected a fellow of the Royal Society of Edinburgh, his proposer being Sir David Brewster. He lived in the Bishops House on the corner of Greenhill Gardens and Strathearn Place.

== Publications ==
- Psalms and Hymns Composed by T B Morrell (1864)
