= John Rawlings (priest) =

Anglican priest

John Edmund Frank Rawlings (born 15 April 1947) is an Anglican priest. He was the Archdeacon of Totnes until 2014.

Rawlings was educated at Godalming Grammar School and trained for the priesthood at King's College London (spending his final year at St Augustine's College, Canterbury) and ordained in 1971. After curacies at Rainham and Burgh Heath he was a naval chaplain until 1992. He was vicar of St Eustachius' Church, Tavistock from 1992 to 2005, and Archdeacon of Totnes from 2005 until 2014, when he retired.

Church of England titles
Preceded by Richard Gilpin	Archdeacon of Totnes; 2005–2014	Succeeded by Douglas Dettmer
