= William Collumpton =

Archdeacon of Totnes

William Collumpton was Archdeacon of Totnes in England during 1549.
