= Robert (archdeacon of Totnes) =

Robert was the Archdeacon of Totnes before 1184. He was the second son of Gille, or Egidia, of Salisbury and he appeared as Robert fitzGille in at least one document of Bartholomew Iscanus. His second brother was John of Salisbury. Robert and his younger brothers (John and Richard, who became a canon of Merton Priory) were close, and Robert even seems at some point to have bailed Richard out of trouble. Despite being a canon of Exeter, and therefore bound by clerical celibacy, Robert was married and had a son. He was also styled 'magister' and described as a physician: he left all his medical books to Plympton Priory, whither he retired sometime before his death in 1186.
