= John Cobham (archdeacon of Totnes) =

John Lawrence Cobham (12 May 1873 – 27 December 1960) was an Anglican priest.

He was educated at Merchant Taylors' School, Crosby and Corpus Christi College, Cambridge and ordained in 1897. He was Curate of Great Yarmouth from 1896 to 1900; and then of Christ Church, Gipsy Hill until 1904.He was Vicar of Carshalton from 1904 and a Chaplain to the British Armed Forces during World War I. Later he was Vicar of St Peter, Tunbridge Wells and then Rector of St Mark's Torquay.

He was appointed the Archdeacon of Totnes from 1933 until 1947. His son was Archdeacon of Durham from 1953 until 1969.

== Notes ==
Church of England titles
Preceded by Thomas Newton Leeke	Archdeacon of Totnes; 1933–1947	Succeeded by Edgar Francis Hall
