= Frederic Evans (cricketer) =

English cricketer and Anglican cleric (1842-1927)

Reverend Canon Frederic Rawlins Evans (1842–1927) was an English cricketer and Anglican cleric. He represented Oxford University and the Gentlemen of England and in his ecclesiastical career rose to become Honorary Canon of Worcester. He was a nephew of George Eliot.

== Family life ==
Frederic Rawlins Evans was born on 1 June 1842 at Griff House, Bedworth, Warwickshire. His father, Isaac, was the brother of Mary Ann Evans. He and Mary became estranged following the scandal surrounding the latter's relationship with George Lewes, but it has been argued that she based the character of Fred Vincy in Middlemarch on her nephew Frederic.

== Cricket career ==
Evans was educated at Cheltenham College, Rugby School and Exeter College, Oxford, from where he graduated with a third in Classical Moderations and it seems he devoted most of his time to games. He made his debut for Oxford University against MCC at Magdalen College in 1863 and was awarded his blue that year, top-scoring with 25 in Oxford' first innings at Lord's. He won blues in the subsequent two seasons and in the match against Cambridge in 1865 he made his highest score of 43. In that season he was also selected for the Gentlemen versus Players in what turned out to be his final appearance and he returned his best bowling figures of 5-32.

Evans was a right-handed, middle or lower-order batsman and a fast right-arm round-armed bowler. In 1863 he was no-balled for bowling from above the shoulder and from then on his opportunities with the ball were limited. He scored 302 runs at 18.87 and took 13 wickets at 14.75. He also played for Gentlemen of Warwickshire and the Free Foresters.

== Church career ==
Frederic Evans was appointed curate at Hagley, Worcestershire in 1866. He was appointed curate of St George's Church, Kidderminster in 1868 and became vicar of that church in 1872. In 1876 he was appointed Rector of Bedworth and he subsequently became Dean of Monks Kirby and in 1905 Canon of Worcester. He was described as a pleasant and non-doctrinal cleric. He was one of the main fund-raisers for the rebuilding of All-Saints Church, Bedworth.

Evans married Charlotte Rotherham in 1888 and they had one daughter, Alison. He died at Bedworth Rectory on 4 March 1927.
