= John de Bradelgehe =

John de Bradelgehe was the first Archdeacon of Totnes, holding office before 1140.
