= Thomas Kent (priest) =

Thomas Kent (died 1561) was the Archdeacon of Totnes. According to one source he held the post during 1549. This Thomas Kent has been tentatively identified with the Thomas Kent of the period who was canon of Christ Church, Oxford, and who died in 1561–2. That Thomas Kent was also rector of Marsh Gibbon from 1546. The CCEd database makes Thomas Kent archdeacon of Totnes only in 1562; being rector of Tedburn St Mary and Holsworthy.
