= Thomas de Charlton =

Thomas de Charlton was Archdeacon of Totnes during 1302.
