= Oldridge =

Oldridge is a surname. Notable people with the surname include:

- Barry Oldridge (born 1950), New Zealand wrestler;
- Bob Oldridge (born 1957), British footballer;
- Riley Oldridge (born 2004), British boxer.
