= Richard Cowe =

Richard Cowe was the Archdeacon of Totnes in the year of 1219.
