= Jim Cowe =

New Zealand footballer

Personal information
- Full name: James Cowe
- Place of birth: New Zealand

Senior career*
Years	Team	Apps	(Gls)
- Runanga

International career
1936	New Zealand	1	(0)
- * Club domestic league appearances and goals

James Cowe is a former association football player who represented New Zealand at international level.

Cowe made a single appearance in an official international for the All Whites in a 1–7 loss to Australia on 4 July 1936.
