= Nicholas Kendall (priest) =

Nicholas Kendall (died 3 March 1740) was the Archdeacon of Totnes, England from 1713 until 1739.

He was born the son of Bernard Kendall of Lostwithiel and educated at Exeter College, Oxford, matriculating in 1673, and graduating B.A. in 1677, and M.A. in 1679/80. He was incorporated at Cambridge in 1699 and became Rector of Sheviock, Cornwall from 1680 to 1740 and Vicar of Lanlivery in 1681. He was made a prebendary of Exeter in 1688, a post he held until his death on 3 March 1739/40.

He was father of Charles and Walter.

Church of England titles
Preceded by George Fleetwood	Archdeacon of Totnes; 1713–1739	Succeeded by George Baker
