= Ralph Heathcott =

Ralph Heathcott was Archdeacon of Totnes during 1499 .
