= Lewis Swete =

Lewis Swete was the Archdeacon of Totnes during 1583.

He was educated at Oxford University and made a fellow of All Souls' College in 1563, graduating B.A. in 1563 and M.A. in 1567, B.D. in 1574 and awarded D.D. in 1581–2. Granted a licence to preach in 1582/3 he became rector of Sampford Peverell in 1571, of East Allington in 1573, and of Uplowman in 1579. He was appointed canon of Exeter in 1583 and archdeacon of Totnes in 1584.
