= George Carnac Barnes =

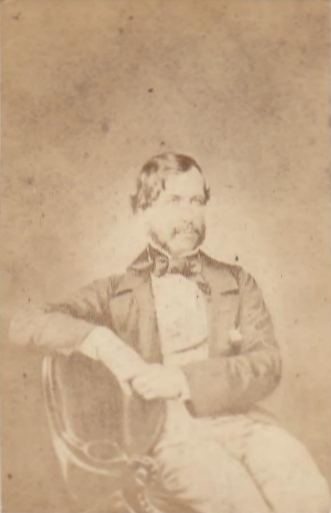

George Carnac Barnes, CB (1818 – 13 May 1861) was a British administrator in India.

The son of the Venerable George Barnes, Archdeacon of Barnstaple and Archdeacon of Bombay, he was educated at Westminster School before proceeding to India. As Commissioner of the Cis-Sutlej States, he preserved their allegiance during the Indian Mutiny, for which he was appointed a CB.

He was appointed Foreign Secretary to the Government of India in succession to Cecil Beadon by Lord Canning, but soon died of dysentery. He was succeeded by Sir Henry Marion Durand.

His son Sir George Stapylton Barnes was a civil servant in Britain and in India. Another son, Monsignor Arthur Stapylton Barnes, was a prominent Roman Catholic clergyman. A nephew, Sir Hugh Shakespear Barnes, also reached high office in India.
