= William Fawell =

William Fawell was Archdeacon of Totnes during 1557.
