= George Hughes (priest) =

English priest and writer

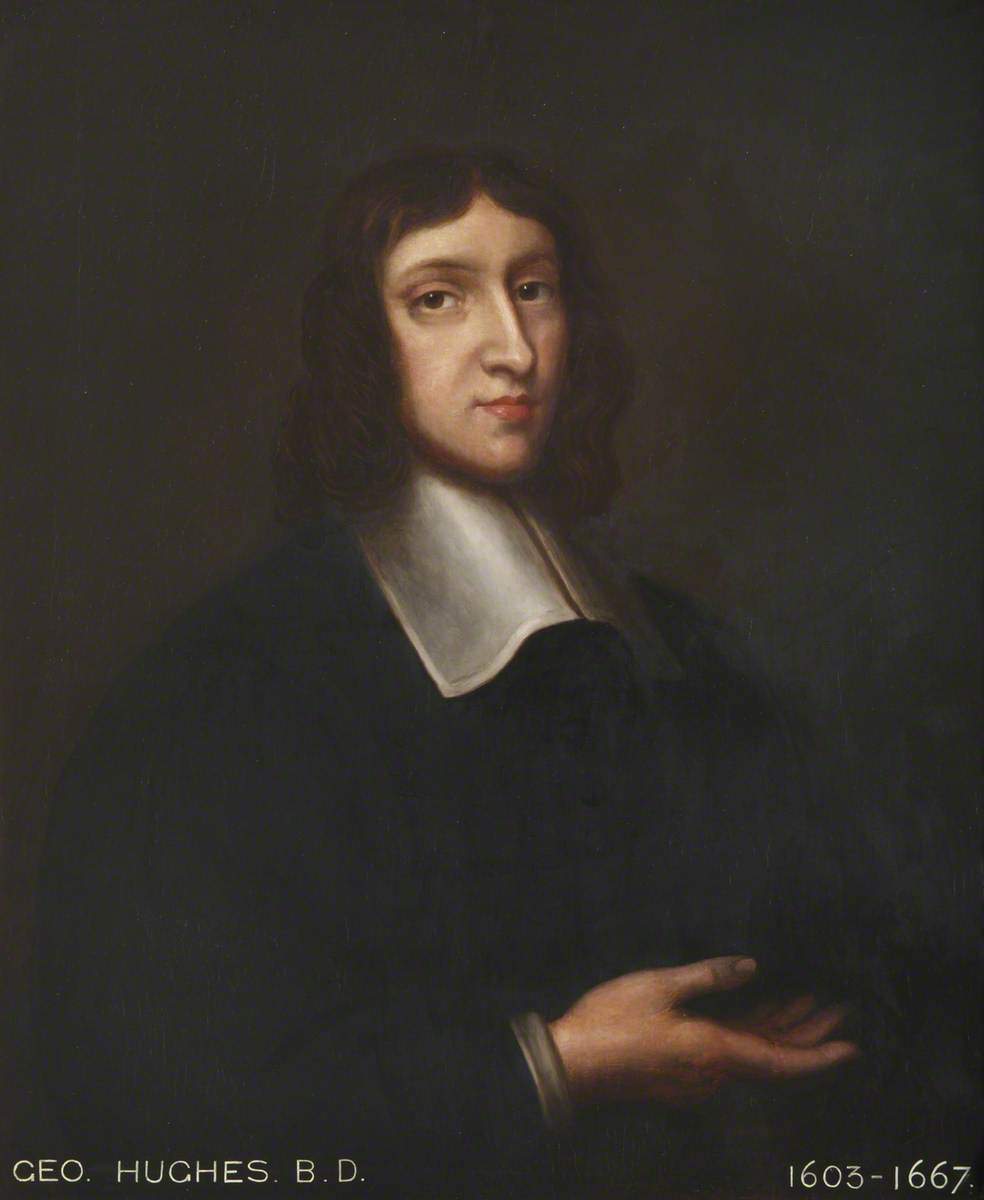
George Hughes, English Puritan cleric, 19th century portrait

George Hughes (1603–1667) was an English Puritan priest and writer.

== Life ==
Born in Southwark, he was sent to Corpus Christi College, Oxford at the beginning of 1619. He was admitted B.A. on 19 February 1623, and proceeded M.A. on 23 June 1625 as a Fellow of Pembroke College. About 1628 he was ordained, and, after serving curacies in and near Oxford, he was chosen in 1631 lecturer at All Hallows, Bread Street, London, where he was popular as a preacher. He commenced B.D. on 10 July 1633.

For his refusal to comply with the rubrics he was suspended by William Laud, and would have emigrated to America had he not been dissuaded by John Dod, on whose recommendation he was appointed chaplain to Robert Greville, 2nd Baron Brooke at Warwick Castle. During his residence there he married a Coventry lady. The mother of John Maynard persuaded Francis Russell, 4th Earl of Bedford to obtain for him the vicarage of St Eustachius' Church, Tavistock in Devon, and the earl also made him his chaplain.

The outbreak of the First Civil War obliged Hughes to move to Exeter, where his wife died. Here Prince Rupert and his staff heard him preach. On his deciding to leave the city the prince provided him with safe-conducts, which enabled him to travel in peace to Coventry. On 21 October 1643 the corporation of Plymouth elected him vicar of St. Andrew's Church. He dedicated to the corporation a work; Richard Baxter considered it the best of its kind.

In 1647 he was appointed to preach before the House of Commons, and received a vote of thanks. The following year he subscribed with seventy-two other ministers to the Solemn League and Covenant. In 1654 he was made one of the assistants to the commissioners of Devon.

After the Act of Uniformity 1662, he was expelled from his living. He continued to reside at Plymouth. For holding services in secret he was arrested in 1665 and, with his brother-in-law and assistant Thomas Martyn, confined on St. Nicholas Island for about nine months. His health was now failing. Friends managed to procure his release by giving security; but he was forbidden to live within twenty miles of Plymouth. He lived at Kingsbridge, Devon, where he died on 4 July 1667, and was buried in the church. A memorial tablet was erected to him about 1670 by Thomas Crispin, for which Hughes's son-in-law John Howe wrote a Latin inscription. His son Obadiah (1640-1704) was grandfather of Obadiah Hughes (1695-1751).

== Works ==
On his island prison he wrote a reply to John Sergeant's 'Sure-footing in Christianity,' 1665, which appeared after his death under the title of 'Sure-footing in Christianity examined,' London 1668. His other writings are, besides sermons preached at the funerals 'of … Captaine Henry Waller,' London, 1632, and 'of Master William Crompton … pastor of Lanceston, Cornwall,' London, 1642:

- 'Aphorisms, or Select Propositions of the Scripture, shortly determining the Doctrine of the Sabbath' (edited by 0. Hughes), London, 1670.
- 'An Analytical Exposition of … Genesis and of xxiii. chap. of Exodus,' fol., Amsterdam, 1672.

He also edited R. Head's 'Threefold Cord to unite Soules for ever unto God,' 1647.

== Notes ==
Attribution

This article incorporates text from a publication now in the public domain: "Hughes, George". Dictionary of National Biography. London: Smith, Elder & Co. 1885–1900.
