= Edmund Chaderton =

Edmund Chaderton was Archdeacon of Salisbury, Archdeacon of Totnes during 1491 and Archdeacon of Chester from 1493.
