= Falwell =

Falwell is a surname. Notable people with the surname include:

- Jerry Falwell (1933–2007), American televangelist, activist, and educator
- Jerry Falwell Jr. (born 1962), American attorney, academic administrator, and prominent Evangelical Christian
- Jonathan Falwell (born 1966), American pastor
