= Whiddon, Chagford =

Historic estate in Devon, England

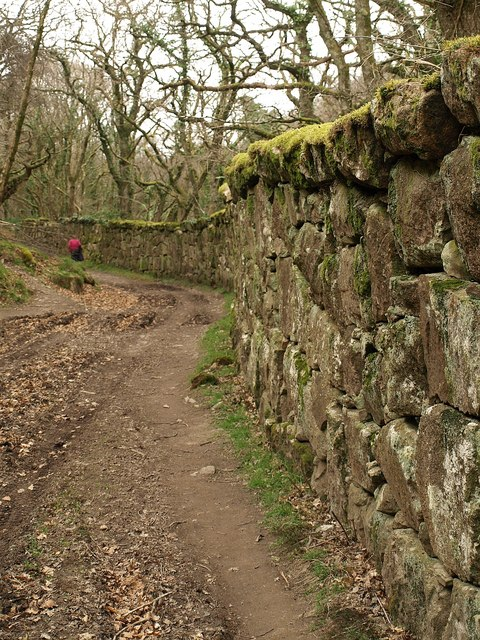
Deer park wall at Whiddon, built of massive granite blocks by Sir John Whiddon (d.1576),

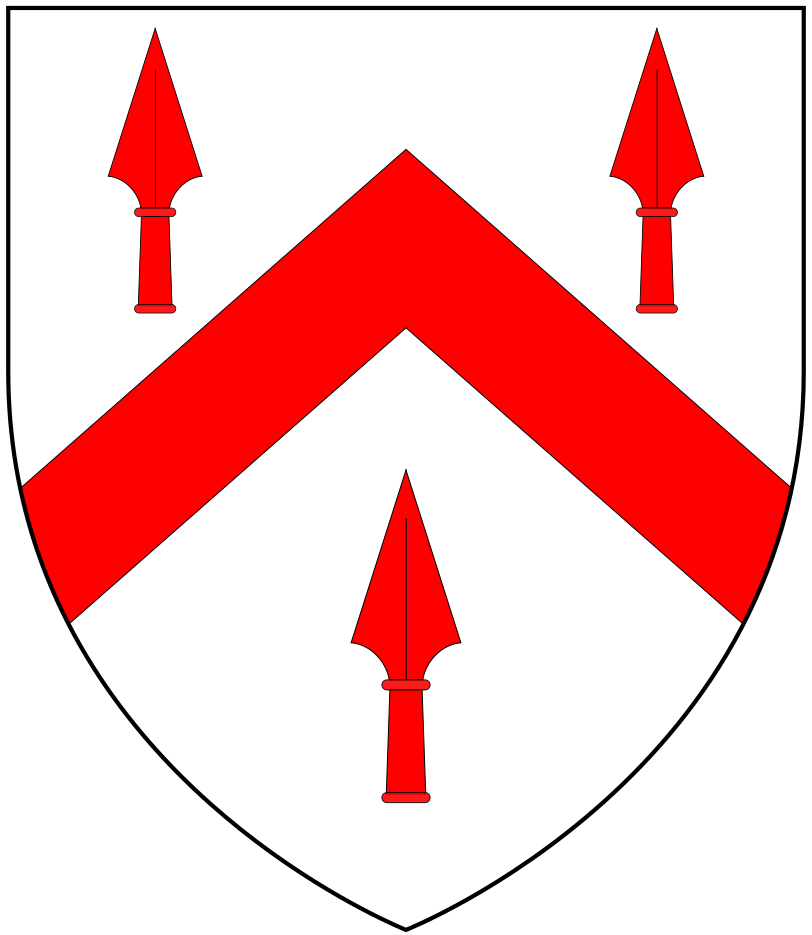
Arms of Whiddon of Chagford: Argent, a chevron between three spearheads gules

Whiddon is an historic estate in the parish of Chagford in Devon, England. The manor house, now known as Whiddon Park House, survives as a remnant of the larger 16th-century mansion house of the Whiddon family. The house displays the date 1649 inscribed above the inner doorway. The manor house is now the property of the National Trust and is let for a nominal rent, but on a full repairing and insuring lease expiring on 17 January 2079.

The deer park, which is bounded by a wall built of massive granite blocks at the entrance to the Teign Gorge, was built by Sir John Whiddon (died 1576), a Justice of the King's Bench. His monument survives in St Michael's Church, Chagford.
