= Roger de Charlton =

Roger de Charlton was Archdeacon of Totnes from 1325 until 1338 .

Church of England titles
Preceded by Robert Fitz-Gildoe	Archdeacon of Totnes; 1325–1338	Succeeded by John de Northwode
