= Archdeacon of Totnes =

Church of England ecclesiastical office

The Archdeacon of Totnes or Totton is the senior ecclesiastical officer in charge of one of the oldest archdeaconries in England. It is an administrative division of the Church of England Diocese of Exeter and under the oversight of the Bishop suffragan of Plymouth. Many of these Archdeacons have been ordained bishops.

== History ==
The first recorded archdeacon of Exeter occurs in 1083, around the time when archdeacons were first appointed in Britain. Around that time, the Diocese of Exeter was divided into four archdeaconries: Exeter, Cornwall, Totnes (or Totton) and Barnstaple (or Barum). This configuration of archdeaconries within the diocese remained for almost 800 years, until the creation of the independent Diocese of Truro from the Cornwall archdeaconry. On 22 March 1918, the archdeaconries were reconfigured and the Archdeaconry of Plymouth created from Totnes archdeaconry. Presently, the diocese operates an informal 'area scheme' such that responsibility for roughly half the diocese is delegated to each suffragan bishop: special oversight is given to the Bishop of Crediton for the Barnstaple and Exeter archdeaconries and to the Bishop of Plymouth for the Plymouth and Totnes archdeaconries.

The archdeacon oversees the deaneries of Moreton, Newton Abbot and Ipplepen, Okehampton, Torbay, Totnes and Woodleigh, in Devon, southwest England.

== List of archdeacons ==
=== High Medieval ===
- bef. 1140–?: John de Bradelgehe
- bef. 1143–aft. 1143: Hugh de Avigo
- bef. c. 1165–aft. c. 1165: Ascelinus
- bef. 1161–aft. 1184: Baldwin of Forde (later Archbishop of Canterbury)
- bef. 1161–aft. 1184: Robert
- ?–3 June 1190 (d.): Bernard
- aft. 1190–?: John Fitz-John
- bef. 1206–aft. 1206: Gilbert Basset
- bef. 1207–aft. 1207: Walter de Grey
- bef. 1207–aft. 1207: John de Bridport
- 1213–aft. 1215: Thomas de Boues
- bef. 1219–aft. 1219: Richard Cowe
- Hugh
- bef. 1225–aft. 1225: Ysaac
- bef. 1226–bef. 1228: John de Kent
- bef. 1228–1231 (res.): Roger de Wynkleigh (became Dean of Exeter)
- bef. 1238–aft. 1254: Thomas Pincerna (aka Thomas Butler)
- bef. 1258–20 February 1258 (d.): John
- bef. 1262–aft. 1262: Geoffrey
- 11 January 1264–bef. 1265: William de Pembroke (previously Archdeacon of Barum)
- 1 November 1265–bef. 1271: Richard Blunt (previously Archdeacon of Barum)
- 11 January 1271–aft. 1273: Thomas de Hertford (also Archdeacon of Barnstaple)
- 25 December 1275 – 8 July 1284 (res.): Henry de Bolleghe (became Archdeacon of Cornwall)
- 8 July 1284 – 1296 (d.): Thomas de Bodham (aka William Bodringham)
- bef. 1297–aft. 1297: Roger le Rous

=== Late Medieval ===
- bef. 1302–aft. 1302: Thomas de Charlton
- bef. 1303–1307 (d.): William de Puntyngdon
- bef. 1307–1338 (d.): Roger de Charlton
- Period of dispute:
  - Northwode et al.:
    - 13 June 1338 – 1349 (d.): John de Northwode (disputed with Piers)
    - 1349–20 June 1359 (exch.): Peter de Gildesburgh (disputed with Swinnerton)
    - 20 June 1359 – 18 May 1371 (exch.): William Steele (disputed with Drax)
    - 18 May 1371 – 7 May 1385 (exch.): Hugh de Bridham
  - Piers et al.:
    - 1342–1344 (d.): John Piers (disputed with Northwode)
    - 1357–?: Richard de Swinnerton (disputed with Gildesburgh)
    - 1359–1361 (d.): Richard de Drax (disputed with Steele)
    - 1372: Richard Desbunton (disputed with Bridham)
- 1385–1407 (d.): John Lydford
- 21 January 1408 – 29 May 1415 (exch.): William Hunden
- 29 May 1415 – 1421 (d.): William Barton
- 3 November 1421 – 16 July 1433 (exch.): John Typhane
- 16 July 1433 – 1443 (d.): Alan Kirketon
- 16 August 1443 – 1453 (res.): John Burneby
- 4 June 1453–bef. 1469: Thomas Manning
- bef. 1469–1478 (d.): Thomas Chippenham
- 15 February–October 1478 (d.): Owen Lord
- bef. 1479–aft. 1482: William Wagott
- "late fifteenth c.": Patrick Haliburton
- 26 March 1491 – 1499 (d.): Edmund Chaderton, Archdeacon of Salisbury (also Archdeacon of Chester from 1493; possibly the Archdeacon of Salisbury)
- 1499–25 November 1499 (d.): Ralph Heathcott
- 15 March 1500 – 18 April 1515 (res.): John Fulford (became Archdeacon of Cornwall)
- 13 May 1515–bef. 1534 (d.): Richard Sydnor (also Registrar of the Garter)
- 28 April 1534–bef. 1549 (res.): George Carew (later Dean of Bristol)

=== Early modern ===
- 10 August 1549–?: William Collumpton (last prior of St Nicholas Priory, and called Bishop of Hippo)
- ?–24 July 1557 (d.): William Fawell (possibly an alias of Collumpton)
- 2 March 1558–?: John Pollard
- ?–1561 (d.): Thomas Kent
- 21 February 1562–?: Robert Lougher (later MP for Pembroke 1572)
- 5 June 1568 – 1580 (d.): Oliver Whiddon
- 24 November 1580–c. 1583 (d.): John Cole
- 12 February 1584: Lewis Swete
- 22 September 1613 – 30 October 1616 (res.): William Parker (became Archdeacon of Cornwall)
- 30 October 1616 – 20 January 1620 (d.): Jasper Swift (previously Archdeacon of Cornwall)
- 17 March 1620–? (res.): William Cotton
- 10 February 1622 – 1647 (d.): Edward Cotton
- 31 August 1660 – 27 August 1693 (d.): Francis Fullwood
- 1693–1 May 1694 (res.): Sir Jonathan Trelawney, Bishop of Exeter (in commendam)
- 18 May 1694 – 14 January 1701 (d.): George Snell
- 18 January 1701 – 1713 (res.): Francis Atterbury (became Bishop of Rochester)
- 28 July 1713 – 3 March 1740 (d.): Nicholas Kendall
- 26 March 1740 – 28 January 1772 (d.): George Baker
- 10 March 1772 – 1775 (res.): Thomas Skynner
- 16 August 1775 – 20 May 1820 (d.): Ralph Barnes
- 30 May 1820 – 23 February 1859 (d.): Robert Froude

=== Late modern ===
- 12 March 1859 – 1872: John Downall
- 3 October 1872 – 1889 (res.): Alfred Earle (became Bishop suffragan of Marlborough)
- 20 January 1888 – 14 July 1910 (d.): Charles Wilkinson, Vicar of Plymouth (until 1901)
- 1910–13 January 1921 (d.): Arthur Simms, Vicar of St Luke's, Torquay (until 1920)

On 22 March 1918, the Archdeaconry of Plymouth was erected from Totnes archdeaconry.

- 1921–26 October 1933 (d.): Newton Leeke
- 1933–1947 (ret.): John Lawrence Cobham, Rector of St Mark's Torwood, Torquay (until 1938; afterwards archdeacon emeritus)
- 1948–1962 (ret.): Edgar Hall (afterwards archdeacon emeritus)
- 1962–23 August 1965 (d.): John Hawkins (father of Richard)
- 1966–1976 (ret.): Robert Newhouse (afterwards archdeacon emeritus)
- 1976–1981 (ret.): John Lucas, Vicar of Chudleigh Knighton (afterwards archdeacon emeritus)
- 1981–1988 (res.): Richard Hawkins, Priest-in-charge, Whitestone with Oldridge (until 1987; son of John; became Bishop suffragan of Plymouth)
- 1988–1994 (res.): Tony Tremlett (became Archdeacon of Exeter)
- 1996–2005 (ret.): Richard Gilpin (afterwards archdeacon emeritus)
- 2005–30 September 2014 (ret.): John Rawlings
- 1 September 2014 – 2015: Clive Cohen (Acting)
- 24 March 2015–present: Douglas Dettmer

== Sources ==
- "Some account of the barony and town of Okehampton: its antiquities and institutions (1889)". W. Masland. 1889.
- Le Neve, John; Hardy, Sir Thomas Duffus (1854). Archdeacons of Totnes or Totton . Fasti ecclesiae Anglicanae. Vol. 1. Oxford: Oxford University Press. pp. 401–404 – via Wikisource.
- Horn, Joyce M. (1964), Fasti Ecclesiae Anglicanae 1300–1541, vol. 9, pp. 17–19
- Wright, W. H. K., ed. (1889). Some Account of the Barony and Town of Okehampton. Tiverton: William Masland.
