= Arthur Ward =

Arthur Ward may refer to:

- Arthur Ward (dairy researcher) (1906–1993), New Zealand accountant, dairy researcher and administrator, company director and university chancellor
- Arthur Ward (priest) (1912–1998), Archdeacon in the United Kingdom
- Arthur Ward (cricketer) (1829–1884), English clergyman, cricketer and cricket administrator
- Art Ward (né Arthur Downs Ward; 1922–2002), American music industry entrepreneur
- Arthur Henry Ward (1883–1959), English novelist, better known as Sax Rohmer
