= William Read (priest) =

William Read was Archdeacon of Barnstaple from 1679 until 1703.

Read was educated at Exeter College, Oxford. He became Rector of Drewsteignton in 1660; and a Canon of Exeter Cathedral in 1662. In 1680 he became Rector of St Michael the Archangel's Church, Chagford.

Church of England titles
Preceded by Joshua Tucker	Archdeacon of Barnstaple; 1679–1703	Succeeded by Robert Burscough
