= Robert Lawe =

Robert Lawe was Archdeacon of Barnstaple from 1582 to 1585.

Church of England titles
Preceded by Henry Squire	Archdeacon of Barnstaple; 1582–1585	Succeeded by William Tooker
