= Edgar Hay =

English clergyman (1863–1949)

Edgar Hay (14 December 1863 – 19 December 1949) was Archdeacon of Barnstaple from 1935 to 1945.

He was educated at St Paul's and Corpus Christi College, Cambridge. He was ordained in 1887 and held incumbencies at Carlton Colville, Plymtree and Exeter.

== Notes ==
Church of England titles
| Preceded by Frank Emlyn Jones | Archdeacon of Barnstaple; 1935–1945 | Succeeded by Denis James |
