= William Hole =

William Hole may refer to:

- William Hole (artist) (1846–1917) English artist
- William Hole (engraver) (died 1624), English engraver
- William Hole (priest) (fl. 1791–1798), Archdeacon of Barnstaple
- William J. Hole Jr. (1918–1990), American film director
