= Woollcombe =

Woollcombe is a surname. Notable people with the surname include:

- Charles Woollcombe KCB KCMG (1857–1934), British Army General during World War I
- Harry Woollcombe (1869–1941), the inaugural Bishop of Whitby from 1923 until 1939
- Henry Woollcombe (1813–1865), Archdeacon of Barnstaple from 1865 until his death
- Jocelyn Woollcombe, DBE (1898–1986), Director of the Women's Royal Naval Service from 1946 to 1950
- Kenneth Woollcombe (1924–2008), Anglican academic who was Bishop of Oxford in the middle part of his career, from 1971 to 1978
- Stephen Woollcombe, Progressive Conservative Party of Canada candidate in the 2000 Canadian federal election

== See also ==
- Woolcombe
