= John Tyake =

John Tyake was Archdeacon of Barnstaple from 1515 to 1518.

Church of England titles
Preceded by John Young	Archdeacon of Barnstaple; 1515–1518	Succeeded by Richard Tollett
