= Montpelier Square =

Square in London, England

Coordinates: 51.5002°N 0.1665°W

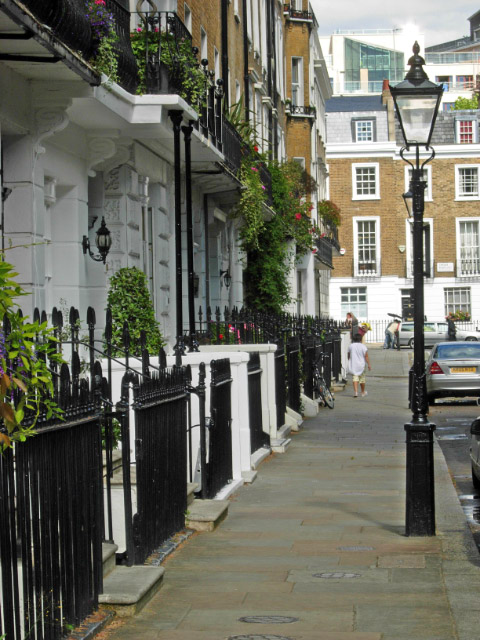
Many of the houses along the northern side of the square and the face of one of an adjoining street

Montpelier Square is a residential garden square in Knightsbridge, London, and is administratively in the City of Westminster. The homes were built in the 19th century and are of brick construction, partly covered with stucco. All of the buildings facing inwards are listed grade II (the mainstream, initial category) in the heritage listing scheme used in England.

== History, extent, listing details and value ==
From a point in Plantagenet England until 1955, Kensington's eastern spur was thinner, amounting to Brompton (a forlorn term for a wedge of Knightsbridge to the south). Instead these easterly fields of Kensington Gore reaching north to nearly the Serpentine and going past its hamlet hub to the fence of the Palace (formerly royal manor) then from 1901 to Kensington Church Street) presented the largest exclave within Ossulstone (the Kensington Gore detached part of St Margaret Westminster).

Internally, excluding small porches, the square measures 260 feet (79 m) by 200 feet (61 m). Private communal gardens, to centre, measure 0.2 hectares (0.49 acres).

Grade II listing of 44 Montpelier Street, one of two southern approach ways, means that all houses within two-house-fronts of directly facing the square plus those – all classical houses, whether internally converted to flats – facing it are listed buildings. 1–17, 17a–43 are listed Grade II on the National Heritage List for England for their architectural merit. No.s 44 to 47, forming the eastern approach way (there is also a fourth approach way which is to the west) are not listed.

Average full houses, on long leases, of the square cost £8.2 million in 2018.

In 2007, the Evening Standard saw the square a strong 'street of success' where 'the capital's corporate power brokers choose to make their homes'. The square ranked equally, 36th, as to declared housing of directors of companies with a turnover of more than £10 million.

== Notable residents ==
- Writer Robert S. Hitchens in 1891, and was later home to the Hungarian writer Arthur Koestler and his third wife, Cynthia. Koestler and his wife committed suicide at the house in 1983 - No.8.
- Joyce Grenfell (née Phipps) was born at No.29 on 10 February 1910.
- Actress and dancer Leslie Caron (with theatre director, her husband Peter Hall and children) in the 1960s. Her home was mapped in an April 1966 article in TIME magazine that popularised the phrase the 'swinging Sixties' - No.31.
- Actor Walter Lacey and his wife, also an actor between 1852 and 1860 - No.38.
- Architect Matthew Digby Wyatt in 1851 - at No.40.
- In 1856 members of the Pre-Raphaelite Brotherhood who edited The Oxford and Cambridge Magazine, founded by William Morris. It was the home of Wilfred Heeley, whose visitors included Edward Burne-Jones and William Fulford; they met and lodged at "20" (now No.18).

Helen Cecelia Black visited Mrs. Lovett Cameron at her such home for her book Notable Women Authors of the Day: Biographical sketches and described the rich interior of Cameron's house.

Victor Lownes lived at No. 3 in the 1960s; Christine Keeler attended a party there in 1966 where she was spiked with LSD. Roman Polanski and Stuart Whitman were also guests at the party. The Beatles also went to parties at Lownes's house.

The dancer Michael Flatley sold his house for £7.2 million in 2015.
