= Peregrine Ilbert =

Anglican clergyman (died 1805)

Peregrine Ilbert (1765 – 26 June 1805) was an Anglican clergyman who was Rector of Farringdon, Devon and Archdeacon of Barnstaple from 1799 to 1805. He was the son of William Ilbert of West Alvington, Devon.

Church of England titles
Preceded by John Andrew	Archdeacon of Barnstaple; 1799–1805	Succeeded by Jonathan Parker Fisher
