= Woolcombe =

Woolcombe is a surname. Notable people with the surname include:

- Gary Woolcombe (born 1982), British boxer
- Henry Woolcombe (1813–1885), Archdeacon of Barnstaple from 1865 to 1885.
- John Woolcombe (1680–1713), Member of Parliament for Plymouth in Devon 1702–05, Sheriff of Devon in 1711–12

== See also ==
- Woollcombe
