= John Orum =

English churchman and academic

John Orum (died 1436?) was an English churchman and academic. He was vice-chancellor of Oxford University, and Archdeacon of Barnstaple from 1400 to 1429.

== Life ==
Orum was a member of University College, Oxford, and graduated as D.D. In 1406 and 1408 was vice-chancellor or commissary for Richard Courtenay. Orum was made archdeacon of Barnstaple on 1 November 1400, and held this office until 1429; he also appears as archdeacon of Cornwall in 1411. He held the prebend of Holcomb at Wells Cathedral in 1408, and in 410 received a canonry there. On 4 January he received the prebend of Fridaythorpe, York Cathedral, which preferment he had vacated before October 1412. On 21 December he received the church of Road, Somerset, but exchanged it for Ashton Keynes, Wiltshire, on 18 April 1414.

In February 1429 Orum became chancellor of the diocese of Exeter. He seems to have resigned the chancellorship before 21 September 1436, and probably died soon afterwards. In accordance with his will, dated 27 September 1436, Orum was buried in the porch of Exeter Cathedral. He left 40 shillings for the perpetual chanting of an antiphon there, and gave a cope to the cathedral.

== Works ==
Orum was author of Lecturæ super Apocalypsim habitæ in Ecclesia Wellensi: 1, De ecclesia; 2, De avaritia; 3-6, De cantu. These lectures are contained in Bodleian MS. 2722. Some of the other anonymous tracts in the same manuscript may be by him.

Church of England titles
| Preceded by Richard Aldtyngton | Archdeacon of Barnstaple; 1400–1429 | Succeeded by John Waryn |
