= John de Reynham =

John de Reynham was Archdeacon of Barnstaple from 1350 to c.1352.

Church of England titles
Preceded by John de Nassington	Archdeacon of Barnstaple; 1350–c.1352	Succeeded by Hugh de Monyton
