= John Derby (disambiguation) =

John Derby is an American football player.

John Derby may also refer to:

- John Derby (Leicester MP) represented Leicester (UK Parliament constituency)
- John Derby (Wallingford MP) for Wallingford (UK Parliament constituency) in 1380s and 1390s
- John de Derby, Archdeacon of Barnstaple

== See also ==
- John Derby Allcroft, politician
- John Darby (disambiguation)
