= Richard de Wideslade =

Richard de Wideslade was the Archdeacon of Barnstaple from 1318 to 1329.

Church of England titles
Preceded by Richard de Morcester	Archdeacon of Barnstaple; 1318–1329	Succeeded by William Zouche
