= Trevor Lloyd (priest) =

Bertram Trevor Lloyd (born 15 February 1938) is an Anglican priest and author.

Lloyd was educated at Highgate School and Hertford College, Oxford. He was ordained in 1964 and began his career with a curacy at Christ Church, Barnet and held incumbencies at Holy Trinity, Wealdstone and St Michael, Harrow until his archdeacon’s appointment. He was Archdeacon of Barnstaple from 1989 until his retirement in 2002.

== Selected works ==
Selected works by Lloyd:

- Informal Liturgy (1972)
- Lay Presidency at the Eucharist? (1977)
- Celebrating Lent, Holy Week and Easter (1985)
- A Service of the Word (1999)
- How to Share the Leadership of Worship (2009)

Church of England titles
Preceded by Ronald George Herniman	Archdeacon of Barnstaple; 1989–2002	Succeeded by David Allan Gunn-Johnson
