= Ralph II (archdeacon of Barnstaple) =

Ralph was an Archdeacon of Barnstaple during the early part of the Thirteenth century.
