= David Gunn-Johnson =

David Allan Gunn-Johnson (born 2 May 1949) is a retired Archdeacon of Barnstaple.

He was educated at St Stephen's House, Oxford, ordained in 1981 and began his career with curacies in Oxhey and Cheshunt. After this he was Team Rector at Colyton and then Rural Dean of Honiton until his archdeacon’s appointment. He was Archdeacon of Barnstaple in the Diocese of Exeter from 2003 until 2014.

Church of England titles
Preceded by Trevor Lloyd	Archdeacon of Barnstaple; 2003–2014	Succeeded by Mark Butchers
