= Richard Norton (priest) =

Richard Norton (died 1523 or 1524) was Archdeacon of Barnstaple during 1508. He had been rector of Ilfracombe from 1492.
