= St Mary's Church, Totnes =

St Mary’s Church, Totnes
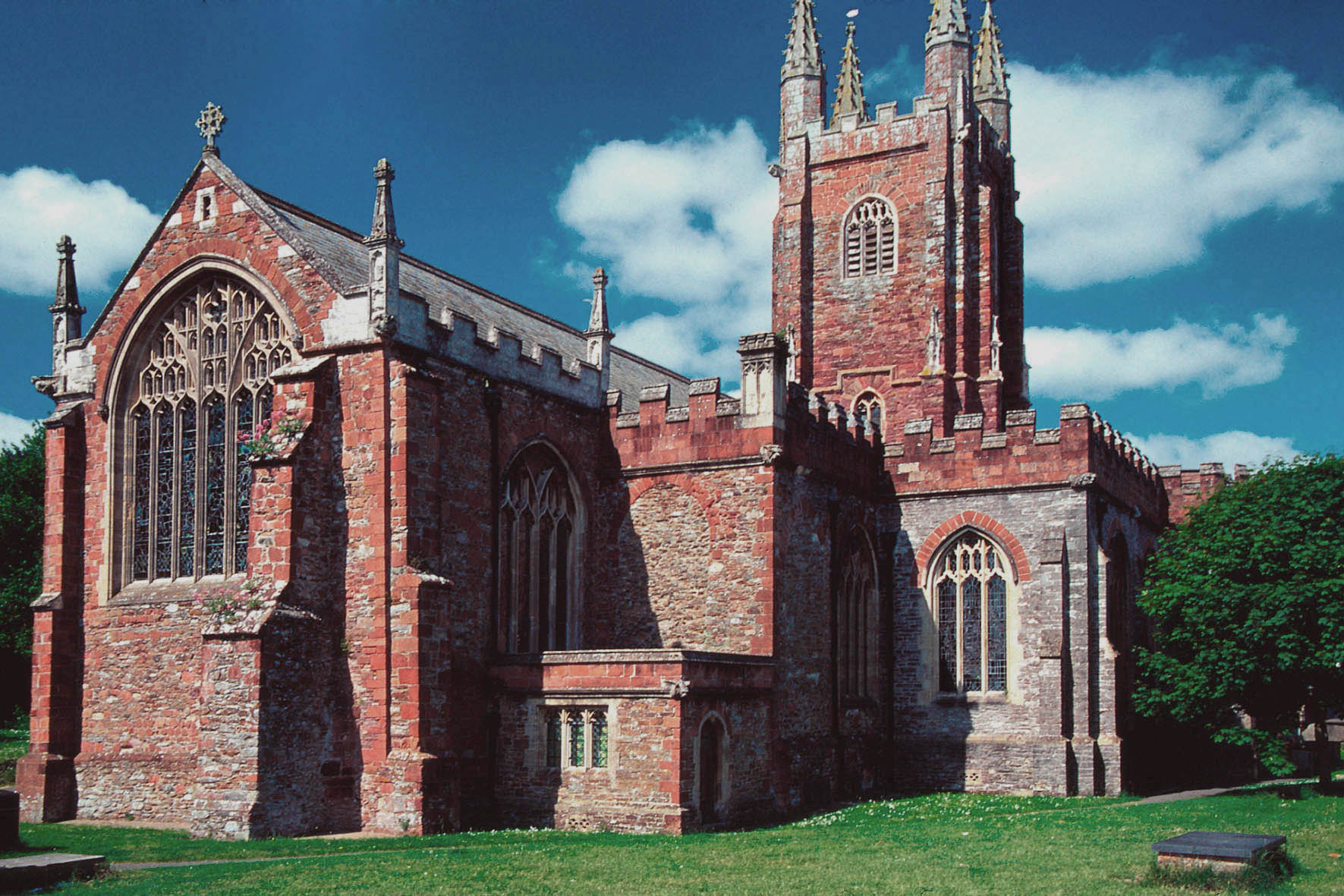
- St Mary’s Church, Totnes

- Location within Devon
- 50°25′54.4″N 3°41′17″W
- OS grid reference: SX 80219 60473
- Location: Totnes
- Country: England
- Denomination: Church of England

History
- Dedication: Saint Mary the Virgin

Architecture
- Heritage designation: Grade I listed
- Designated: 7 January 1952

Administration
- Province: Canterbury
- Diocese: Exeter
- Archdeaconry: Totnes
- Deanery: Totnes
- Parish: Totnes

St Mary's Church, Totnes is a Grade I listed parish church in the Church of England Diocese of Exeter in Totnes, Devon.

== History ==
The church was built as part of the Benedictine Priory of St Mary. The townspeople came to an arrangement with the priory for the complete rebuilding in the 15th century, and the church was rebuilt in sections with the nave being done first between 1432 and 1444, the chancel between 1445 and 1448, the tower between 1449–59 and the screen from 1459 to 1460. The mason Roger Crowden is noted as having designed the tower, and given the similarity in style for the rest of the church, he may be responsible for the whole works. The pillars are similar in design to St Mary's Church, Brixham and both churches may have shared an architect.

The church is noted for the monument to Walter Smith who died in 1555. It is erected in the south chancel aisle and comprises a tomb-chest in an ogee recess with quatrefoil decoration.

The candelabra in brass was installed in 1701.

In 1824 the outer north aisle was added. This north aisle was modified in 1869 by Sir Gilbert Scott who added additional seating which allowed for the removal of the western galleries and the galleries in the rood loft.

== Vicars ==
- ca. 1260 Walter
- 1267 - 1268 Bartholomew
- 1268 - 1283 Peter de Totton
- 1283 - ???? William de Sutton
- ???? - 1310 Walter D’Aumarle
- 1310 - 1330 Nicholas de Mothaye
- 1330 - 1337 Walter de Essewater
- 1337 - 1348 John de Heineston
- 1348 - 1349 Andrew de Chevlston
- 1349 - 1351 John Trehewin
- 1351 - 1362 John de Southdon
- 1362 - 1367 John de Wyndyshore
- 1367 - 1376 John Michel
- 1376 - 1406 John Sabyn
- 1406 - 1436 John Dolbiry
- 1436 - ???? William Howsyng
- ???? - 1464 John Yonge
- 1464 - 1495 John Gardiner
- 1495 - 1505 John Belworthy
- 1505 - 1537 William Jelys
- 1537 - 1551 Christopher Cannon
- 1551 - 1554 John Okeford
- 1554 - 1561 John Bowdon
- 1561 - 1576 Thomas Wright
- 1576 - 1610 William Goodall
- 1610 - 1621 Henry Hill
- 1621 - 1635 Richard Holditch
- 1635 - ???? John Garrett
- ???? - 1664 William Adams
- 1664 - 1667 Daniel Estcott
- 1669 - 1674 Phineas Pett
- 1676 - 1681 John Prince
- 1681 - 1709 Robert Burscough
- 1709 - 1720 Arthur D’Anvers
- 1720 - 1767 John Hayne
- 1767 - 1781 Samuel Payne
- 1781 - 1783 John Cuming
- 1783 - 1786 John Woolridge
- 1786 - 1795 John Alan Lyde
- 1795 - 1838 Joseph Cuming
- 1838 - 1888 James Walrond Burrough
- 1888 - 1893 Benjamin Mills
- 1893 - 1911 Thomas Henry Elliott
- 1911 - 1927 W.T. Wellacott
- 1927 - 1950 John Heywood Waddington
- ca. 1954 Gordon H. Samuel

== Organ ==
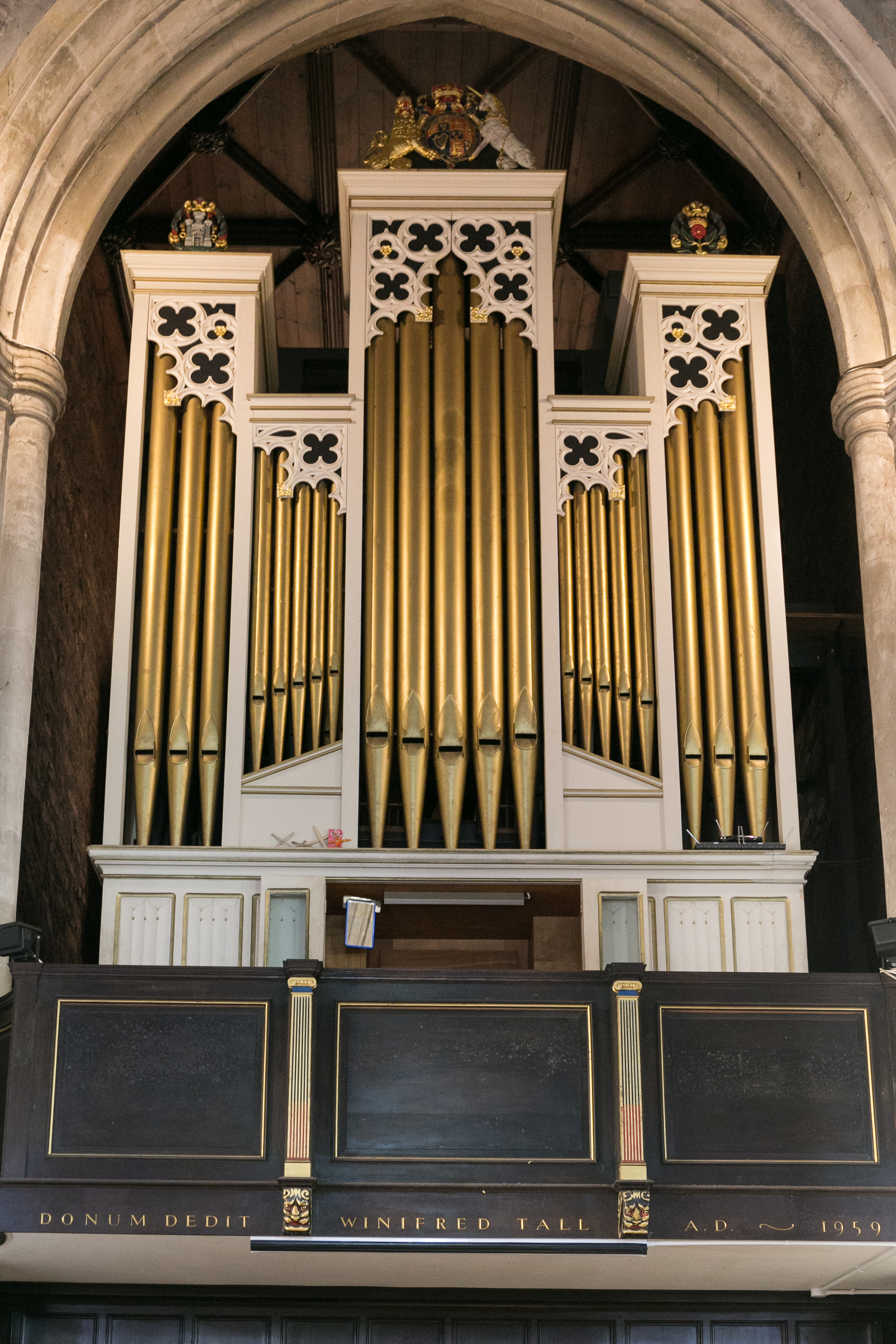
The organ

The church is likely to have contained an organ before the reformation. The first post-Reformation organ was installed in 1720 and survived until 1817. A new organ by Flight and Robson was then installed.

The basis of the current instrument is a pipe organ which was built by Father Henry Willis for the Great Exhibition in 1851 and installed and opened by him in Totnes on Sunday 11 August 1861. It has since had subsequent restorations and modifications and now comprises 3 manuals and pedals with 33 speaking stops. A specification of the organ can be found in the National Pipe Organ Register.

=== Organists ===
- William Reeve 1781 - 1783
- William Coombe 1802 - 1811 (formerly organist at Chard, Somerset, afterwards organist of Chelmsford)
- Henry Compton ca. 1818 - 1858
- John Horth Deane 1859 - 1864 (formerly organist of St John's Church, Torquay and Beccles Church, Suffolk)
- Herr Eberlein 1864 - 1867 (formerly organist of St Peter's Church, Tiverton, afterwards organist of St Leonard's Church, Exeter)
- Richard Sparke Distin ca. 1870
- Herbert Worth 1878 - 1929
- Anthony B. Kitson 1930 - ca. 1938

== Bells ==
The tower contains a peal of 8 bells. Four bells date from 1732 by Abraham Rudhall, two from 1863 by John Warner and Sons, one from 1897 by John Warner and sons, and the last from 1935 by Gillett & Johnston.
