= Schalk =

Schalk is both a patronymic surname and a Germanic given name. As a given name, with the meaning "servant", it has been recorded as early as the 8th century as Scalco and Scalcho. The composite given name "Godschalk" or "Gottschalk" (God's servant) was more popular with the higher classes. Quite common in the Low Countries in the Middle Ages, it is now primarily an Afrikaans given name. Notable people with the name include:

== Given name ==
- Schalk Booysen (1927–2011), South African sprinter and middle distance runner
- Schalk Brits (born 1981), South African rugby player
- Schalk Burger (born 1956), South African rugby player using the name Burger Geldenhuys
- Schalk Burger (born 1983), South African rugby player
- Schalk Willem Burger (1852–1918), acting President of South Africa (1900–02)
- Schalk Ferreira (born 1984), South African rugby player
- Schalk van der Merwe (1961–2016), South African tennis player
- Schalk van der Merwe (rugby union) (born 1990), South African rugby player
- Schalk Verhoef (1935–1997), Dutch road cyclist

== Surname ==
- Alex Schalk (born 1992), Dutch footballer
- Andreas Schalk (born 1984), German politician
- Carl Schalk (1929–2021), American church music composer
- Chaim Schalk (born 1986), Canadian beach volleyball player
- D. J. Schalk, pseudonym of David Kalisch (1820–1872), German playwright and humorist
- Franz Schalk (1863–1931), Austrian conductor
- Gertrude Schalk (1906–1977), African-American writer, columnist, and newspaper editor
- Henriette Goverdine Anna van der Schalk (1869–1952), Dutch poet and socialist
- Jeff Schalk (born 1974), American mountain bike racer
- Johann Schalk (1903–1987), German World War II fighter ace
- Josefine Schalk (1850–1919), German painter
- Joseph Schalk (1857–1900), Austrian conductor, musicologist and pianist; older brother of Franz Schalk
- Louis Schalk (1926–2002), American test pilot
- Peter Schalk (born 1961), Dutch politician
- Ray Schalk (1892–1970), American baseball player, coach, manager and scout
- Roy Schalk (1908–1990), American baseball player and manager

== See also ==
- FC Schalke 04, a German football club
- Schalke (Harz), a mountain in Lower Saxony, Germany
- Schalks, New Jersey, an unincorporated community in the United States
- Schellekens, a Dutch surname with the same origin
