= Deanery of Shirwell =

The Deanery of Shirwell is part of the Archdeaconry of Barnstaple, one of the four archdeaconries in the Diocese of Exeter in the Church of England.

== Parishes ==
The parishes of the Shirwell Deanery are:

- Berrynarbor
- Bittadon
- Bratton Fleming with Stoke Rivers
- Brendon
- Challacombe
- Combe Martin Church of St Peter ad Vincula, Combe Martin
- Countisbury
- East Buckland
- East Down, Devon with Arlington, Devon
- Ilfracombe Holy Trinity Church, Ilfracombe
- Ilfracombe St Philip and St James
- Kentisbury
- Landkey
- Loxhore
- Lynton
- Martinhoe
- Mortehoe St Mary's Church, Mortehoe
- Parracombe
- Saint Matthew, Lee
- Saint Sabinus, Woolacombe Church of St Sabinus, Woolacombe
- Shirwell Church of St Peter, Shirwell
- Swimbridge
- Trentishoe
- West Buckland, Devon
