= Henry Squire =

English poet and clergyman

Henry Squire (or Squier) was an English poet and clergyman, and Archdeacon of Barnstaple from 1554 to 1582.

== Magdalen College ==
Henry Squire or Squier was born in 1532 in Warwickshire. He was admitted to Magdalen College, Oxford, in 1548 or 1549, and was sworn in during November 1549, aged 16. He took his B.A. in 1551, and he later took an M.A., though there is no record of this. After the death of Henry Brandon and Charles Brandon, dukes of Suffolk, on 14 July 1551, Squire wrote a Latin verse for the memorial volume Vita et obitus duorum fratrum Suffolciensum [Life and Death of the Two Suffolk Brothers]. In 1552, he was elected a fellow of Magdalen. On 16 June 1553, he was punished by his college ‘for reading a declamation from a book’. On 26 May 1554, at the age of about 21, he was installed as Archdeacon of Barnstaple. His patron was John Veysey, bishop of Exeter. Veysey may have been a relative, for his mother was Joan Squier, daughter of Henry Squier of Handsworth in Staffordshire. In 1555, Henry Squire resigned his fellowship at Magdalen.

== Work in the Church ==
Henry Squire kept the archdeaconry of Barnstaple until he resigned it in 1582 to Robert Lawe. In the meantime, he picked up three other church livings, and held on to them quite as tenaciously. He seems to have kept all of them until his death in 1587. On 2 January 1559, he was instituted to the rectory of Northfield in Worcestershire, in the diocese of Worcester. His patron was Edward Leveson, who was a relative of John Leveson, who married Amice Harman, the sister of Squire’s early patron, John Veysey.

On 9 September 1562, Squire was instituted to the vicarage of Witheridge in Devon. His patron on this occasion was Lewis Stukeley of Affeton, a few miles to the south-west of Witheridge. (He was the brother of the famous adventurer Thomas Stukeley.) Stukeley’s mother was Jane Pollard, daughter of sir Lewis Pollard of Grilstone, Devon. He was the son of Robert Pollard and Agnes Lewkenor, but Robert's first (or second) wife was Joan Marwood, whose mother was Agnes Squire. These Squires were seated at Heanton Punchardon, near Barnstaple; and there may be some old connection between them and the Squires of the west midlands as yet to be discovered.

On 24 October 1562, Squire was collated to a prebend in Exeter Cathedral by William Alley, the new bishop of Exeter.

On 29 July 1563, Henry Squire was instituted to the rectory of Iddesleigh in Devon. His patron on this occasion was Anthony Harvey, esq., but the true patron was sir John St Leger of Annery in Monkleigh, Devon. His daughter Frances was the wife of Lewis Stukeley’s son and heir, John Stukeley. So Henry Squire certainly seems to have made good of whatever connections he had to the gentry of this part of central Devon. Henry Squire, M.A., died at Iddesleigh in 1587, and was buried at his church of St James on 21 May.

Church of England titles
| Preceded by John Pollard | Archdeacon of Barnstaple; 1544–1554 | Succeeded by Robert Lawe |
