= John Bartholomew (priest) =

John Bartholomew (25 October 1790 – 24 September 1865) was an Anglican priest who was Archdeacon of Barnstaple from 1847 to 1865.

Bartholomew was born in the Parish of St Davids, Exeter, to Rev. Robert and Ann Bartholomew. His father was Head Master of the Exeter Grammar School. He was educated at Corpus Christi College, Oxford (BA 1813, MA 1820), and he was both made deacon and ordained priest in 1817 by the Bishop of Exeter.

He was appointed Curate of Withycombe Rawleigh in 1817, and of Sowton in 1819, Rector of Lympstone in 1820 and, additionally, a Prebendary of Exeter in 1831. He was Rector of Morchard Bishop since 1831, Canon residentiary of Exeter since 1840, and Archdeacon of Barnstaple since 1847. He was also the author of Archidiaconal Charges.

Bartholomew died unexpectedly in 1865 in Morchard Bishop. He had two daughters and four sons, with two sons joining the church and two the military.

Church of England titles
Preceded by George Barnes	Archdeacon of Barnstaple; 1847–1865	Succeeded by Henry Woolcombe
