= Roger Keys =

English churchman, architect and academic

Roger Keys or Keyes (died 1477) was an English churchman and academic, Warden of All Souls' College, Oxford, from 1442 to 1445.

== Life ==
Keys is mentioned in 1437, when, together with John Druell, later the Archdeacon of Exeter, he was architect and inspector of works at the building of All Souls' College, Oxford, undertaken by Archbishop Henry Chichele. He was one of the original fellows of the college, and succeeded Richard Andrews as warden in 1442, holding that post for three years.

In 1448 Keyes was summoned by Henry VI of England to act as clerk of the works for the new royal foundation of Eton College. For his services at Eton he and his brother, Thomas Keys, received a grant of arms and patent of nobility from the king on 19 May 1449, and he was made Archdeacon of Barnstaple, 25 January 1450, holding the post to 1460.

Keys acted as precentor of Exeter Cathedral in 1467 and 1469, and apparently held the post till his death. In 1469 he made a present of books to Exeter College, Oxford. He died on 11 November 1477, and was buried at Exeter.
