= John Andrew (archdeacon) =

English cleric

John Andrew (1750–1799), MA was an English cleric, Archdeacon of Barnstaple from 1798 to 1799.

Church of England titles
Preceded by Roger Massey	Archdeacon of Barnstaple; 1798–1799	Succeeded by Peregrine Ilbert
