= Roger (archdeacon of Barnstaple) =

Roger was the fourth Archdeacon of Barnstaple.
