= Isaac (archdeacon of Barnstaple) =

Isaac was the Archdeacon of Barnstaple until 1227.
