= John Wele =

John Wele was Archdeacon of Barnstaple from 1309 to 1312.

Church of England titles
Preceded by William Fitsrogo	Archdeacon of Barnstaple; 1309–1312	Succeeded by Walter Giffard
