= St Mary's Church, Brixham =

St Mary's Church
- Church of St Mary the Virgin
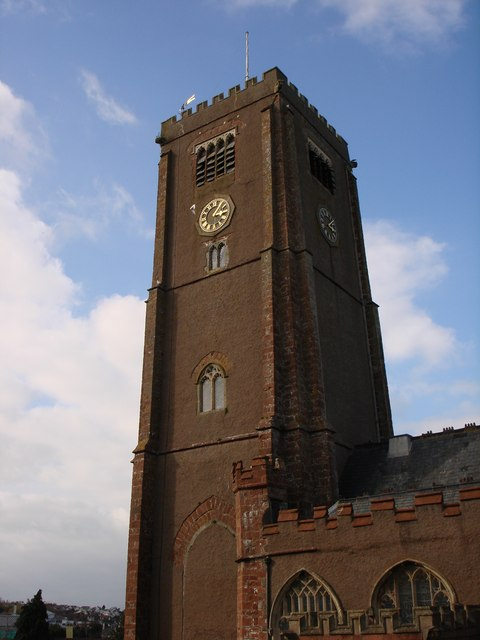
- The Church Tower

- Shown within Devon
- 50.386037°N 3.518772°W
- OS grid reference: SX 92120 55119
- Location: Higher Brixham, Devon
- Country: England
- Denomination: Church of England
- Website: www.achurchnearyou.com/church/8908/

History
- Status: Active

Architecture
- Heritage designation: Grade II*
- Designated: 18-Oct-1949

Administration
- Diocese: Exeter

The Church of St Mary the Virgin is the parish church of Higher Brixham, in the county of Devon, England. It is a listed building of Grade II* and was first listed in 1949.

== History ==
The church building dates from about the fifteenth century, replacing a previous Norman building. It was re-roofed in 1867 and was restored in 1905. The pillars are similar in design to St Mary's Church, Totnes, which was being built in 1432, and the churches may have shared an architect.

The church contains monuments to the Upton family of Lupton House, and to the judge Francis Buller. Its archives are held by the South West Heritage Trust.

== Funding ==
The Friends of St Mary's, Brixham, a registered charity (no. 1041867) has the stated aim "to maintain, repair, restore, preserve, improve, beautify and reconstruct for the benefit of the public the fabric of the church".
