= Ralph Germeyn =

Ralph Germeyn was Archdeacon of Barnstaple until 1308.
