= Walter de Pembroke =

Walter de Pembroke was the ninth Archdeacon of Barnstaple.
