= John (Archdeacon of Barnstaple) =

John was the seventh Archdeacon of Barnstaple, England.
