= Frank Jones (priest) =

Anglican Archdeacon

Frank Emlyn Jones (12 April 1861 – 26 June 1935) was an English priest. He was the Archdeacon of Barnstaple in the Church of England from 1930 to 1935.

Born in Surbiton, Jones was educated at Christ Church, Oxford and ordained in 1885 after covering theological studies at Ripon College Cuddesdon. After a curacy in Bromsgrove he held incumbencies in Bradford and Great Torrington before his years as an archdeacon.

Church of England titles
Preceded by Robert Edward Trefusis	Archdeacon of Barnstaple; 1930–1935	Succeeded by Edgar Hay
