= Company of Ringers of the Blessed Virgin Mary of Lincoln =

Bellringers society

The Company of Ringers of the Blessed Virgin Mary of Lincoln ring the bells of Lincoln Cathedral. It practises the English style of change ringing.

== History ==
The Blessed Virgin Mary of Lincoln Company of Ringers is the oldest ringing society with a continuous history of ringing and was formally instigated on 18 October 1612 under a statute granted by the Dean of Lincoln. The Company were also granted their own chapel, still known today as The Ringers' Chapel.

In 2011 a theatrical event to celebrate the history of the company was staged as part of the Lincoln Arts Festival, using acrobats to portray the physicality of ringing.

== See also ==
- Change Ringing
- Society of Cambridge Youths
