= Joseph Dornford =

English churchman and academic

- Born: January 9, 1794
- Died: January 18, 1868 (aged 74); Plymtree, Devon, England

Joseph Dornford (1794–1868) was an English churchman and academic, senior tutor of Oriel College, Oxford before becoming rector of Plymtree in Devon.

== Early life ==
Born 9 January 1794, he was the son of Sir Josiah Dornford of Deptford, Kent, and the half-brother of the writer Josiah Dornford; his mother Esther Fawcett was a Cambridge lady and good friend of the evangelical leader Charles Simeon, and her son Thomas Truebody Thomason by her first marriage was father of James Thomason. He entered young at Trinity College, Cambridge, which in 1811 he suddenly left to serve as a volunteer in the Peninsular War.

== In Oxford ==
After some military service, Dornford returned and entered Wadham College, Oxford in 1813, where he proceeded B.A. in 1816. In 1817 he was elected to a Michel fellowship at The Queen's College, and in 1819 to a fellowship at Oriel College, where he graduated M.A. 1820. In that year he joined the Russian physician Joseph Hamel on an ascent of Mont Blanc in which three guides were killed.

Dornford was successively elected tutor and dean of Oriel; he was ordained priest in the Church of England in 1822, and was a university proctor in 1830. He succeeded the very different John Keble in the tutorship, in 1823. In that role he played a part in the pre-history of the Oxford Movement, tentatively supporting innovations by John Henry Newman in college teaching. The senior of the four Oriel tutors in 1828 on the election as Provost of Edward Hawkins, Dornford with Newman, Hurrell Froude and Robert Wilberforce, he opposed as they did Robert Peel's 1829 candidacy for Oxford's seat in parliament, preferring Robert Inglis, against the background of Catholic Emancipation. The tutors innovated without consulting Hawkins, with a system that was more pastoral and clerical. Hawkins, who initially had had time for Newman's views, was an Oriel Noetic and was alienated by the Peel issue. College politics became ever more divisive, as Hawkins objected to the changes in teaching.

As the tutorial issue was resolved in 1829 and 1830, Dornford swung his support behind Hawkins. Edward Copleston, now a bishop but a past Noetic and Provost of Oriel, reported to Hawkins that Dornford had split from the other tutors, and gave a nuanced analysis of the teaching debate. Froude, Newman and Wilberforce resigned as tutors in 1830.

== Later life ==
In 1832 Dornford was presented by his college to the rectory of Plymtree, and in 1847 he was collated by Henry Phillpotts a prebendary of Exeter Cathedral. He died at Plymtree on 18 January 1868, aged 74. Dornford's manner was taken to be more that of a soldier than a priest's.

== Works ==
Dornford published sermons. One of these, "The Christian Sacraments", was included in a volume edited by Alexander Watson, Sermons for Sundays, Festivals, and Fasts, and other Liturgical Occasions, contributed by bishops and other clergy of the church (1845). He wrote an account of the Mont Blanc climb for the New Monthly Magazine.

== Notes ==
Attribution

This article incorporates text from a publication now in the public domain: Stephen, Leslie, ed. (1888). "Dornford, Joseph". Dictionary of National Biography. Vol. 15. London: Smith, Elder & Co.
