= Josiah Dornford =

English translator and writer

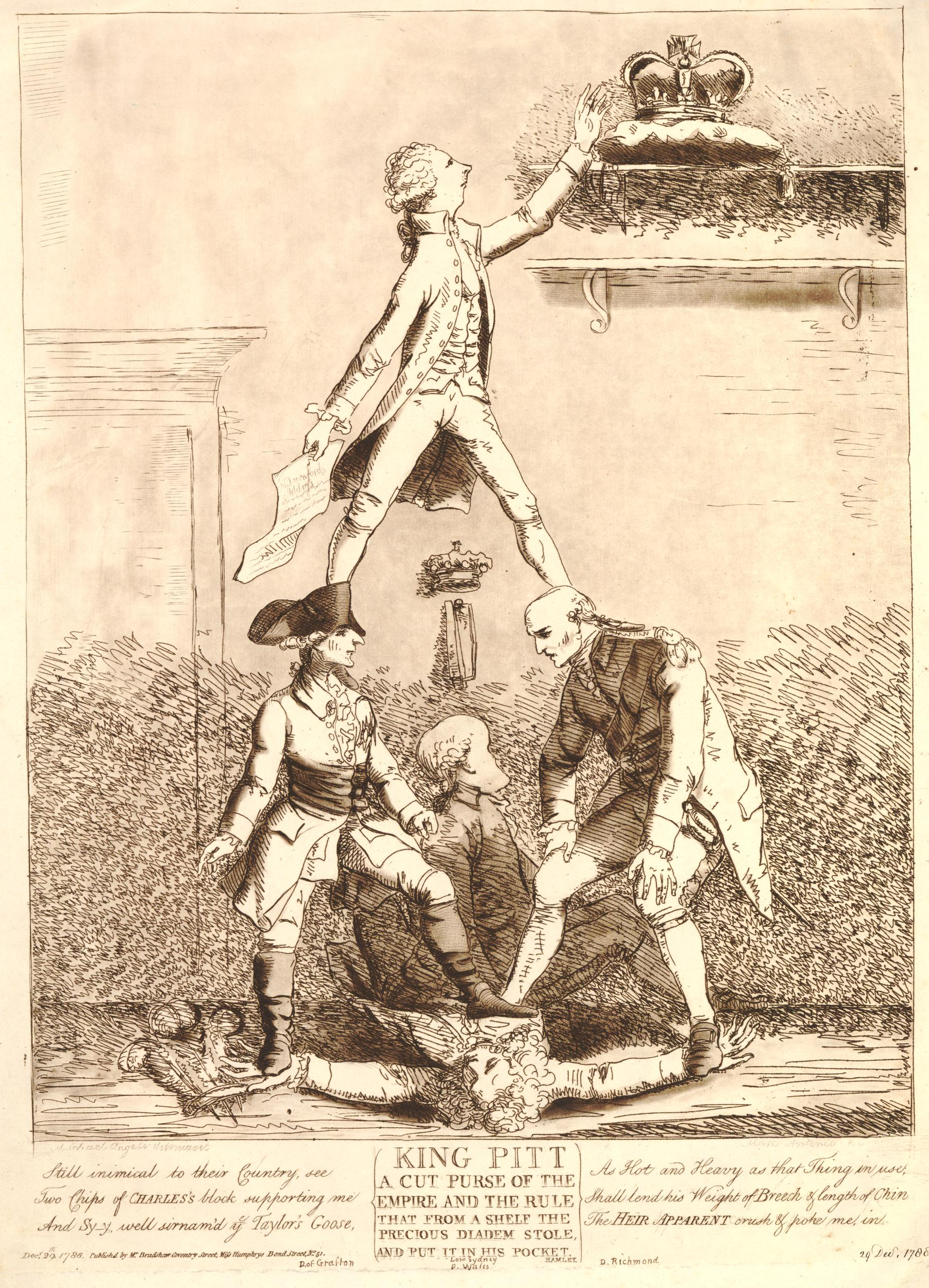
King Pitt, a Cut Purse of the Empire and the Rule that from a Shelf the precious Diadem stole, and put it in his Pocket (1788). (In his right hand is a document inscribed 'Jo. Durnford's address'.)

Josiah Dornford (1762–3 or 1764 – 1797) was an English attorney and political writer proposing reform of debtors' prisons.

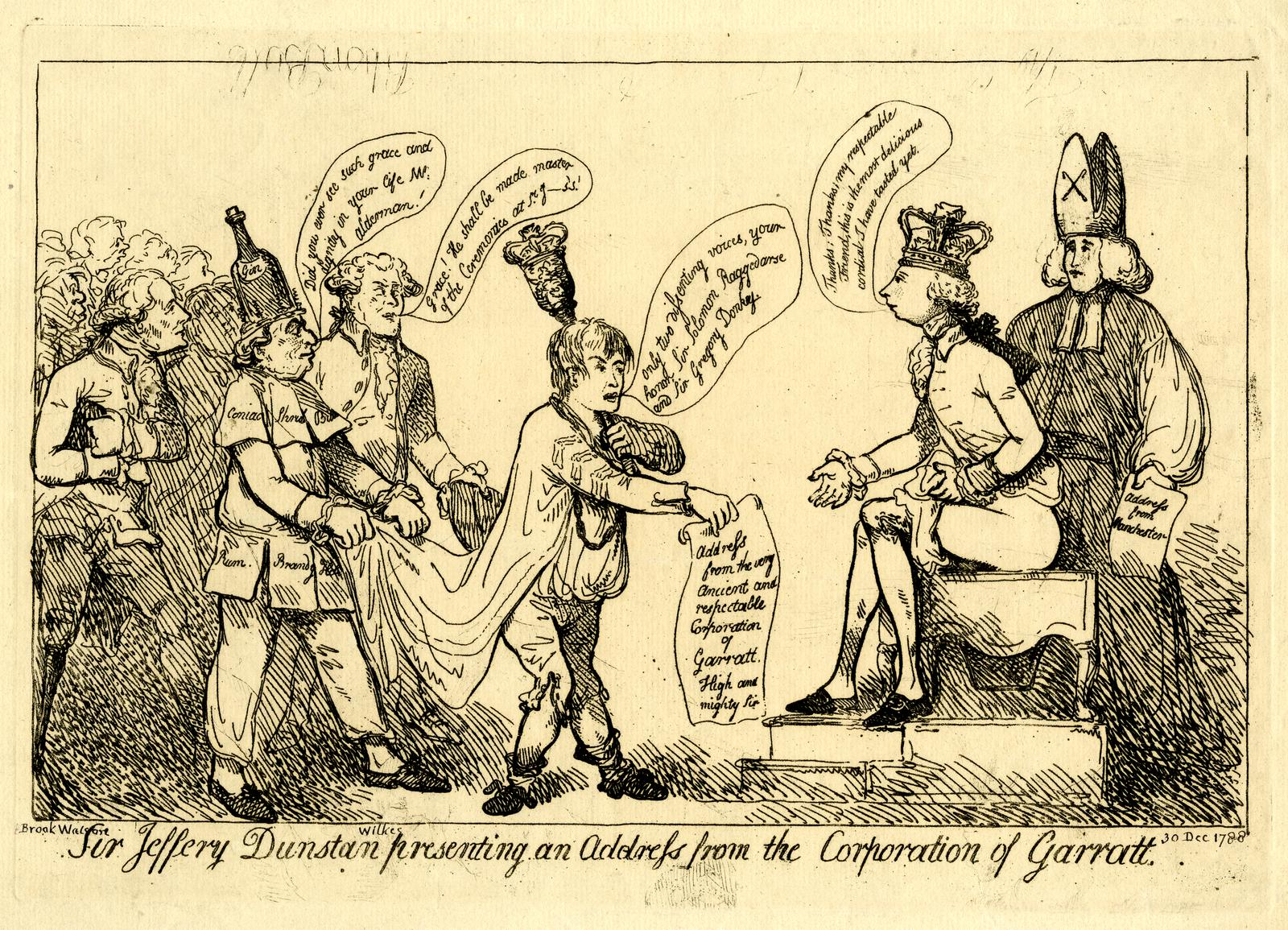
Sir Jeffery Dunstan presenting an Address from the Corporation of Garratt (c. 1788) (Image is associated with: Josiah Dornford.)

== Life ==
Josiah Dornford was the son of Josiah Dornford of Deptford, Kent, a member of the Court of Common Council of the City of London, and the author of several pamphlets on the affairs of that corporation and the reform of debtors' prisons. His half-brother was Joseph Dornford, Church of England clergyman.

He matriculated at Trinity College, Oxford on 23 May 1781, aged eighteen, and graduated BA in 1785 and MA in 1792. He afterwards studied at Göttingen, where he took the degree of LL.D. He was called to the bar at Lincoln's Inn.

In 1795, he was named inspector-general of the army accounts in the Leeward Islands, and the record of this appointment shows that he had served as one of the commissaries to Lord Moira's army. He died at Martinique on 1 July 1797.

== Works ==
In 1790, he published in three volumes an English version of John Stephen Pütter's Historical Development of the Present Political Constitution of the Germanic Empire; the translation was probably executed at Göttingen, where Pütter was a professor of laws.

He also published in Latin a small volume of academic exercises by another Göttingen professor, the philologist Heyne, who, in a preface to this publication, speaks of Dornford as a "learned youth" who had "gained the highest honours in jurisprudence in our academy".

His only other known work is The Motives and Consequences of the Present War impartially considered (1793), a political pamphlet written in defence of the Pitt administration.
