= Bridge Street, Cambridge =

Street in Cambridge, England

Coordinates: 52.2089°N 0.1179°E

Bridge Street is a historic street in the north of central Cambridge, England. It runs between Magdalene Street at the junction with Thompson's Lane to the northwest and Sidney Street at the junction with Jesus Lane to the southeast. Bridge Street used to continue over the Great Bridge on the River Cam, hence the name, but this part is now known as Magdalene Street after Magdalene College, which fronts onto the street.

Leading off the street to the south is St John's Street. Also to the southwest is St John's College, one of the largest University of Cambridge colleges.

The Holy Sepulchre, commonly known as The Round Church, is a Norman church on the corner of Bridge Street and Round Church Street, opposite St John's Street. It was built around 1130, inspired by the original church of the Holy Sepulchre in Jerusalem. Another church, St Clement's Church, is on the corner with Thompson's Lane.

The courts behind the triangle formed by Bridge Street, St John’s Street, and the narrow All Saints Passage to the south survive in layout from the original Medieval city centre.

The Hawks' Club, a members-only gentlemen's club for sportsmen at Cambridge University, founded in 1872, is located at 18 Portugal Place, a cul-de-sac northeast off Bridge Street.

== Gallery ==
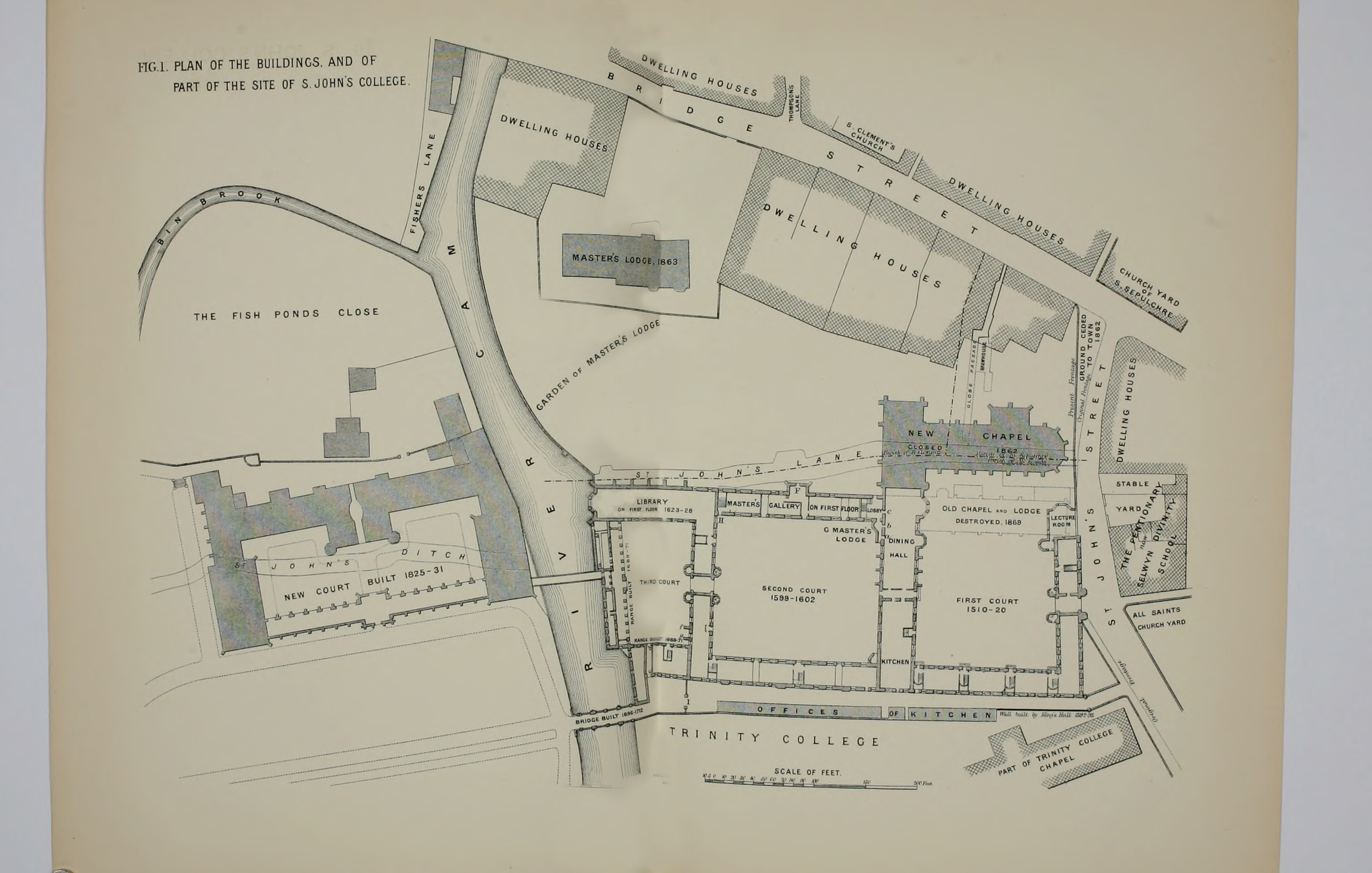
Bridge Street on an 1886 map of St John's College.

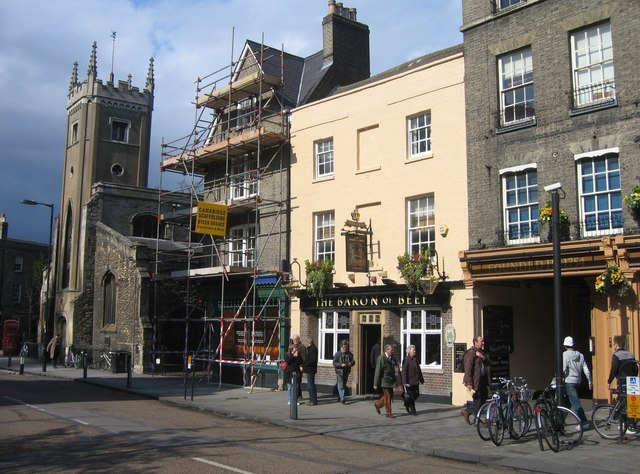
The northeast side of Bridge Street with St Clement's Church in the background.

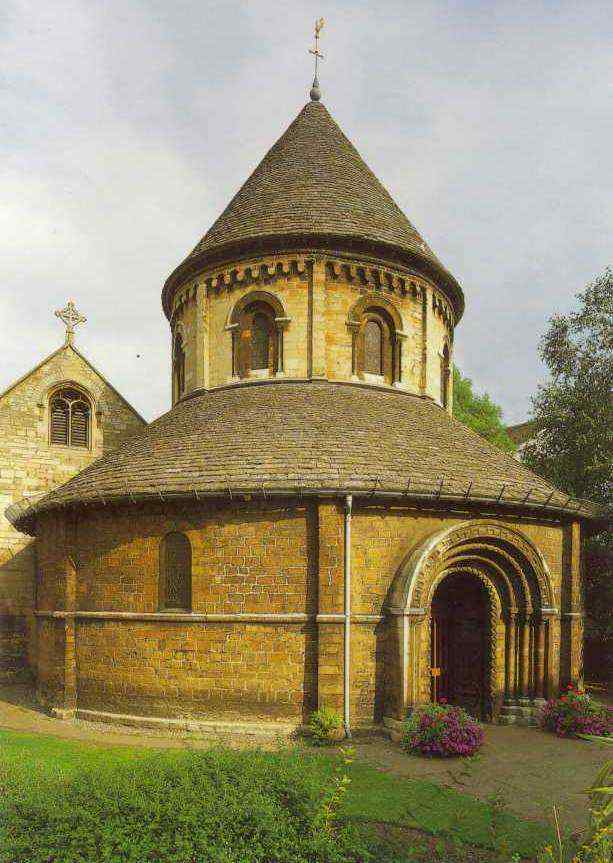
The Holy Sepulchre or "Round Church", on the corner of Bridge Street and Round Church Street.

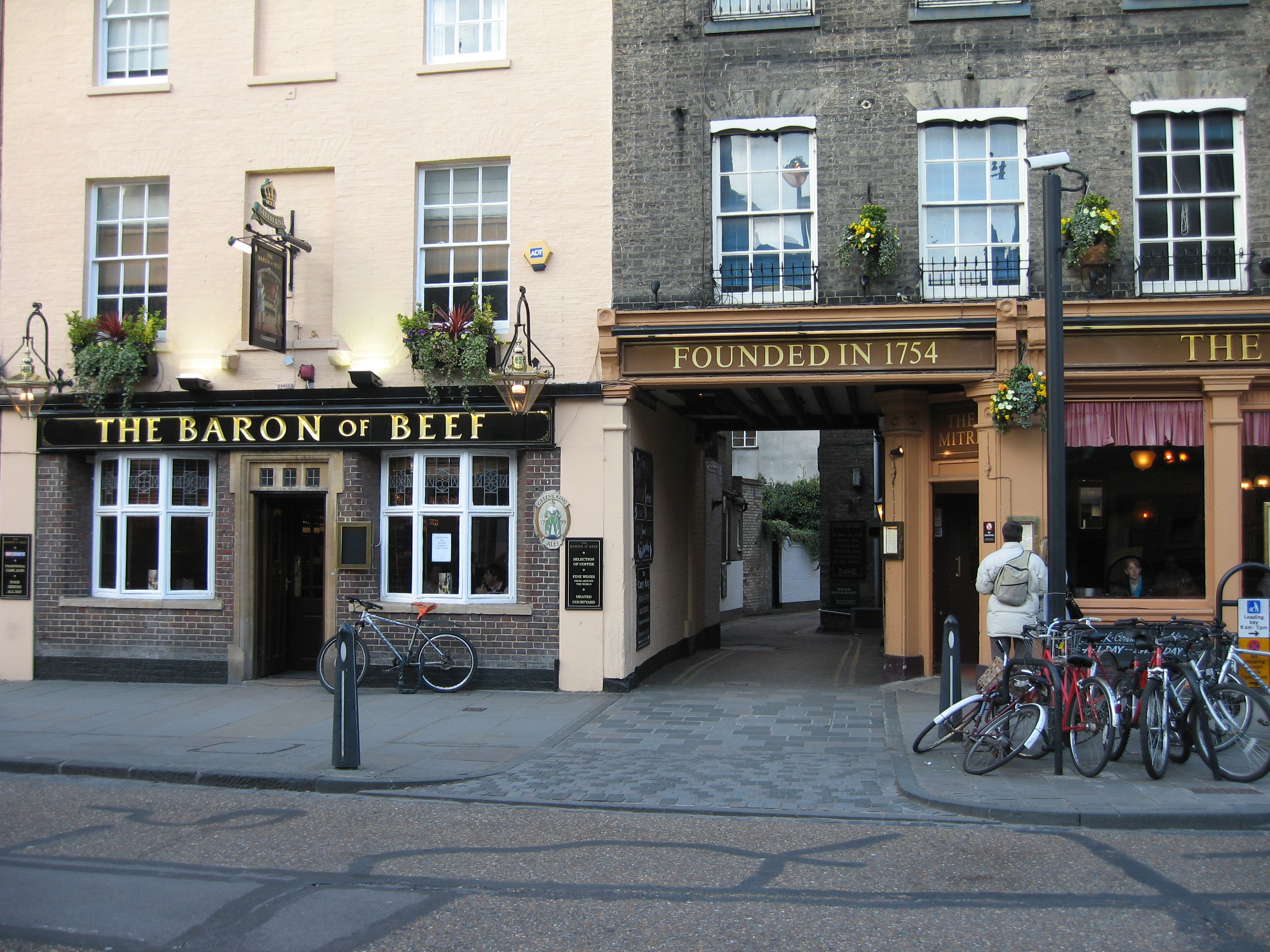
The Baron of Beef public house at 19 Bridge Street.
