= Society of Cambridge Youths =

Bellringers society

The Society of Cambridge Youths is an ancient bellringing society founded and based in Cambridge. It is dedicated to ringing the bells of the university church, Great St Mary's, Cambridge for religious services at the church and also civil and Cambridge University events.

== History of the Society ==
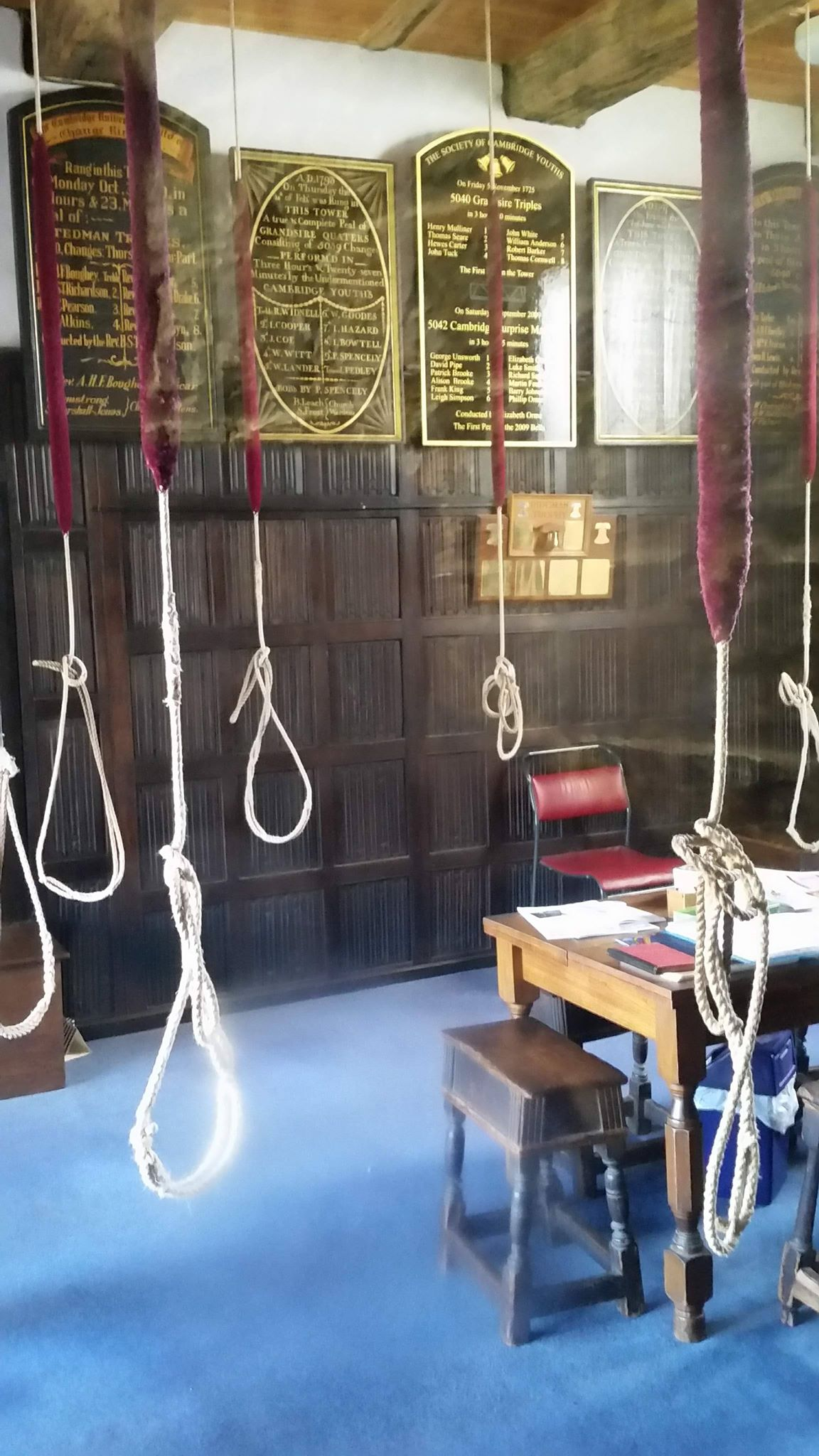
Bell-ringing room in the tower of the Church of St Mary the Great, Cambridge

The parish records of Great St Mary's, Cambridge record that ringing was being undertaken by some form of company of ringers at the church as early as 1572. In 1629 it is hinted in these records that the ringers were at that time called "The Cambridge Scholars". In 1724, when the bells were augmented to 10, the company refounded as "The Society of Cambridge Youths", a name under which the company has continued, making it now the second-oldest ringing society with a continuous history of ringing (the oldest being the Company of Ringers of the Blessed Virgin Mary of Lincoln who are believed to have been formed in 1612).

The Society rings the bells for not only the regular church services but also the University Sermons which take place twice each University term as well as important Civic and National Events (e.g. Election of a new Mayor, Anniversary of VE day, the Coronation etc.).

In 2022, the Society installed a ring of bells at St Clement's Church, Cambridge.

== History of the bells it rings at Great St Mary's ==
Four bells and a sanctus are mentioned in 1516 and it is believed they were at one time hung in a belfry in the churchyard (1594) until the new church tower was not completed until 1608. In 1611 the four bells were recast into a ring of five and augmented to six probably in 1621–2. Two more bells were added to make a ring of eight in 1667/8 and the lightest two of the old six recast. In 1722/3 Richard Phelps recast these bells and added as much metal again to increase the ring to a heavier ring of ten. The tenor was damaged and required recasting by Pack & Chapman in 1770 and the opportunity was taken to increase the ring to twelve. The new front bells were poor examples especially the treble which was shortly recast in 1773. The eleventh was recast in 1825, the tower restored in 1892, the two trebles recast in 1911 and the seventh recast in 1923 due to damage incurred when celebrating the Armistice in 1918. The final major work involved recasting the trebles yet again and rehanging the bells in a new metal frame. For the first time they were also hung to be rung clockwise. In 1992 the 9th cracked during practice ringing and this was repaired (welded) by Soundweld of Lode.

In 2009 following extensive research and consultation a replacement lighter ring (with an incidental bell) in a new frame was installed that not only reduced considerably the problems of tower sway but also resulted in a ring that has been widely praised for its tone, weight and audibility. All the 18th-century bells were preserved in the tower, either for display or as part of the famous clock chimes.

== Membership ==
A ringer is usually only admitted to membership of the society upon showing regular commitment to the ringing at Great St Mary's. Membership is for life and the network of former resident members of the Youths stretches across the globe.

== See also ==
- Change Ringing
- Company of Ringers of the Blessed Virgin Mary of Lincoln
