= Martin Becanus =

Dutch-born Jesuit priest, theologian and controversialist

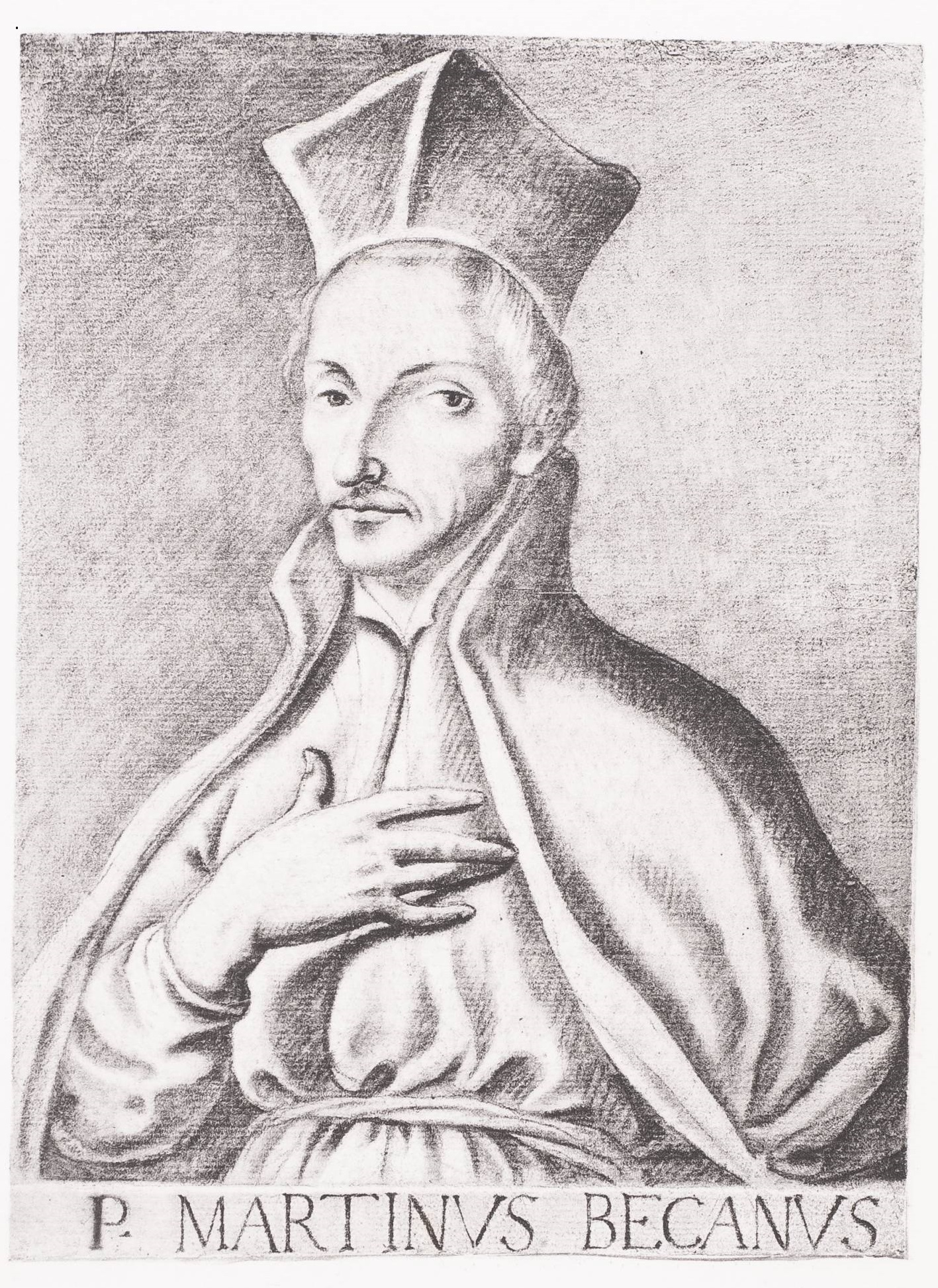
Martinus Becanus

Martinus Becanus (6 January 1563 – 24 January 1624) was a Dutch-born Jesuit priest, known as a theologian and controversialist.

== Life ==
He was born Maarten Schellekens in Hilvarenbeek in North Brabant; Schellekens is a patronymic and he adopted a Latinized form of the surname Van (Hilvaren)Beek. He entered the Society of Jesus on 22 March 1583, and taught Theology for twenty-two years at Würzburg, Mainz, and Vienna.

He died in Vienna, where he was the confessor to the Emperor Ferdinand II.

== Works ==
Becanus is the author of some 37 books, most of them works of polemics.

- He developed the art of controversy and taught it in his book: Manuale controversiarum huius temporis published in Wurzburg (1623), that went into more than 50 editions (in the shortened version until the late 18th century).
- In De fide haereticis servanda (1607) he defended against the opinion of Panormitanus the view that Protestants and Catholics should observe contracts concluded between one another due to natural law.
- Another book had much success: Analogia veteris et novi Testamenti.
- He supported Cardinal Bellarmine in the major allegiance oath controversy with James I of England, publishing six books in the period 1610 to 1613, one against William Tooker and another being directed at Lancelot Andrewes. At the time he was based in Mainz; he was brought into the front line of the discussion of Bellarmine's Apologia by Attileo Amalteo, the nuncio at Cologne.

Among numerous other works was his Summa Theologiae Scholasticae.

== Notes ==
Attribution
