= Mark Butchers =

British Anglican priest

Mark Andrew Butchers (born 1959) is a British Anglican priest who served as Archdeacon of Barnstaple, 2015–2020. From 2020 he was the Principal of the South West Ministry Training Course (SWMTC), now renamed Spiritus College.

He was educated at Trinity College, Cambridge (BA, 1981) and King's College London (MTh, 1990; PhD, 2006). Ordained in 1988 after a period of study at Chichester Theological College, he began his career with curacies in Chelsea and Mitcham. After this he was Team Rector of North Tawton, Bondleigh and Sampford Courtenay with Honeychurch then Chaplain and Fellow of Keble College, Oxford. From 2010 to 2015 he was Vicar of Wolvercote; and from 2012 also Area Dean of Oxford. On 6 September 2020, he became Principal of the South West Ministry Training Course.

In 2023 Butchers stepped down from his role as Principal of SWMTC, and also relinquished a parallel post as Public Preacher in the Diocese of Truro.

Church of England titles
Preceded by David Gunn-Johnson	Archdeacon of Barnstaple; 2015–2020	Succeeded by Verena Breed
