= John de Nassington =

John de Nassington was the Archdeacon of Barnstaple from 1330 to 1349.

Church of England titles
Preceded by William Zouche	Archdeacon of Barnstaple; 1330–1349	Succeeded by John de Reynham
