= John Waryn =

John Waryn was Archdeacon of Barnstaple from 1429 to 1442.

Church of England titles
Preceded by John Orum	Archdeacon of Barnstaple; 1429–1442	Succeeded by Richard Helyer
