= Richard Tollett =

Richard Tollett was Archdeacon of Barnstaple from 1518 to 1528.

He was awarded B.C.L. by Oxford University and LL.D. by Cambridge University in 1504.

He was appointed canon of Lichfield cathedral in 1501, subdean of Exeter cathedral in 1515 and archdeacon of Barnstaple from 1518 until his death in 1528.

Church of England titles
Preceded by John Tyake	Archdeacon of Barnstaple; 1518–1528	Succeeded by Thomas Brerwood
