= Fordmore =

Historic estate in the parish of Plymtree

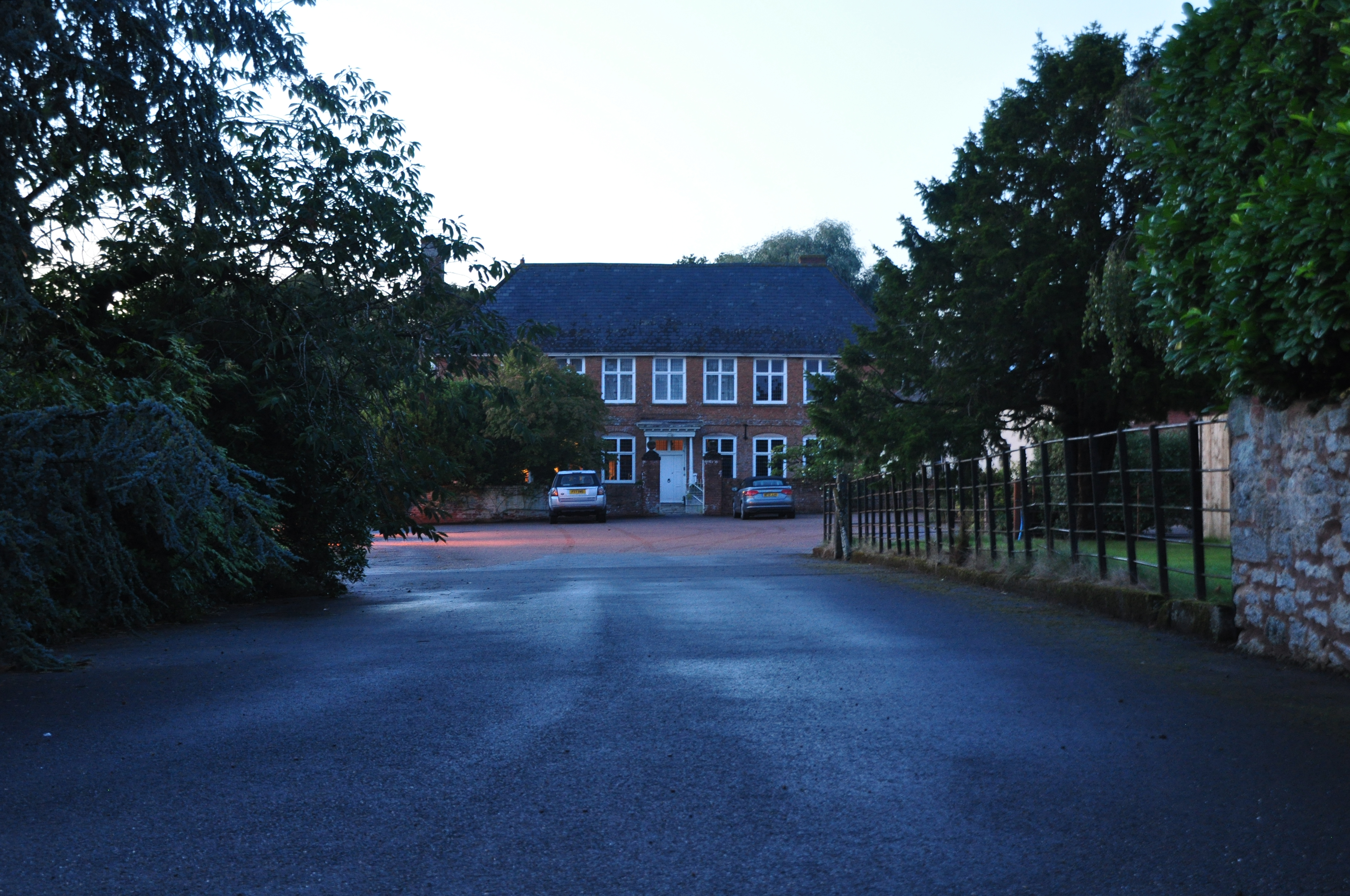
Fordmore in 2014

Arms of Ford of Ford's Moore: Gules, a castle argent crowned or on the port a cross formée of the third

Ford's Moore (modern: "Fordmore") is an historic estate in the parish of Plymtree in Devon. From before 1161 to 1702 it was the seat of the at Ford (later "Ford") family, whose coat of arms is recorded in the heraldic visitation of Devon as Gules, a castle argent crowned or on the port a cross formée of the third. The present farmhouse is a grade II* listed building which remains largely unaltered since it was built in the late 17th century as the mansion-house of the Ford family, when it was one of the earliest brick-built houses in Devon. The interior contains much original decorative plasterwork and carpentry, including a dogleg staircase. A much worn ledger stone survives on the floor of Plymtree Church inscribed: Roger Forde, Esquire, was here buried July the 21st An Do 1631, with another to Thomazin Ford (d.1690) inscribed: Here lyeth the Body of Thomazin Ford, wife of Charles Ford of Plymtree, Esq., and Daughter of Abraham Webber, Gent., who departed This life the xxth day of September in The yeare of Anno Do. 1690, aged 69 yeares. Ann Ford, a co-heiress of Ford's Moore, married William Chave, and purchased or otherwise obtained all the outstanding shares in the property. She bequeathed it to her cousin William Wright of Collumpton, from whom it descended to his niece the wife of Charles Phillpott, the owner in 1822, a banker from Bath in Somerset, commissioned into the Freemasons of Bath in 1784. In 1850 the owner was A. Philpott, Esquire.

Today it is a farmhouse owned by the Persey family who operate a large free-range chicken farm. In 2013 the owner was Herbert Persey (born 1949) and his son James Persey (born 1980).
