= Robert Barforth =

Robert Barforth was Archdeacon of Barnstaple from 1478 to 1486.
