= William de Auco =

Archdeacon of Barnstaple

William de Auco was Archdeacon of Barnstaple until 1155.
