= Owen Lord =

Archdeacon of Barnstaple

Owen Lord was Archdeacon of Barnstaple from 1477 to 1478.
