= Roger Massey =

Roger Massey, MA (b Chester 1759 -d Lawhitton 1798) was Archdeacon of Barnstaple from 1791 to 1798.

Massey was educated at St John's College, Cambridge and ordained in 1785. He held incumbencies in Morwenstow, Farringdon, Lawhitton and Cheriton Bishop. He was also Chaplain to the Bishop of Exeter from 1789 until his death on 22 February 1798.

Church of England titles
Preceded by William Hole	Archdeacon of Barnstaple; 1791–1798	Succeeded by John Andrew
