= Allured (archdeacon of Barnstaple) =

Allured was the first Archdeacon of Barnstaple.
