= Richard Helyer =

Archdeacon of Barnstaple

Richard Helyer (died 1446) was Archdeacon of Barnstaple from 1442 to 1445 and Archdeacon of Cornwall from 1445 to 1446.

Church of England titles
Preceded by John Waryn	Archdeacon of Barnstaple; 1442–1445	Succeeded by Michael Tregury
