= St Clement's Church, Cambridge =

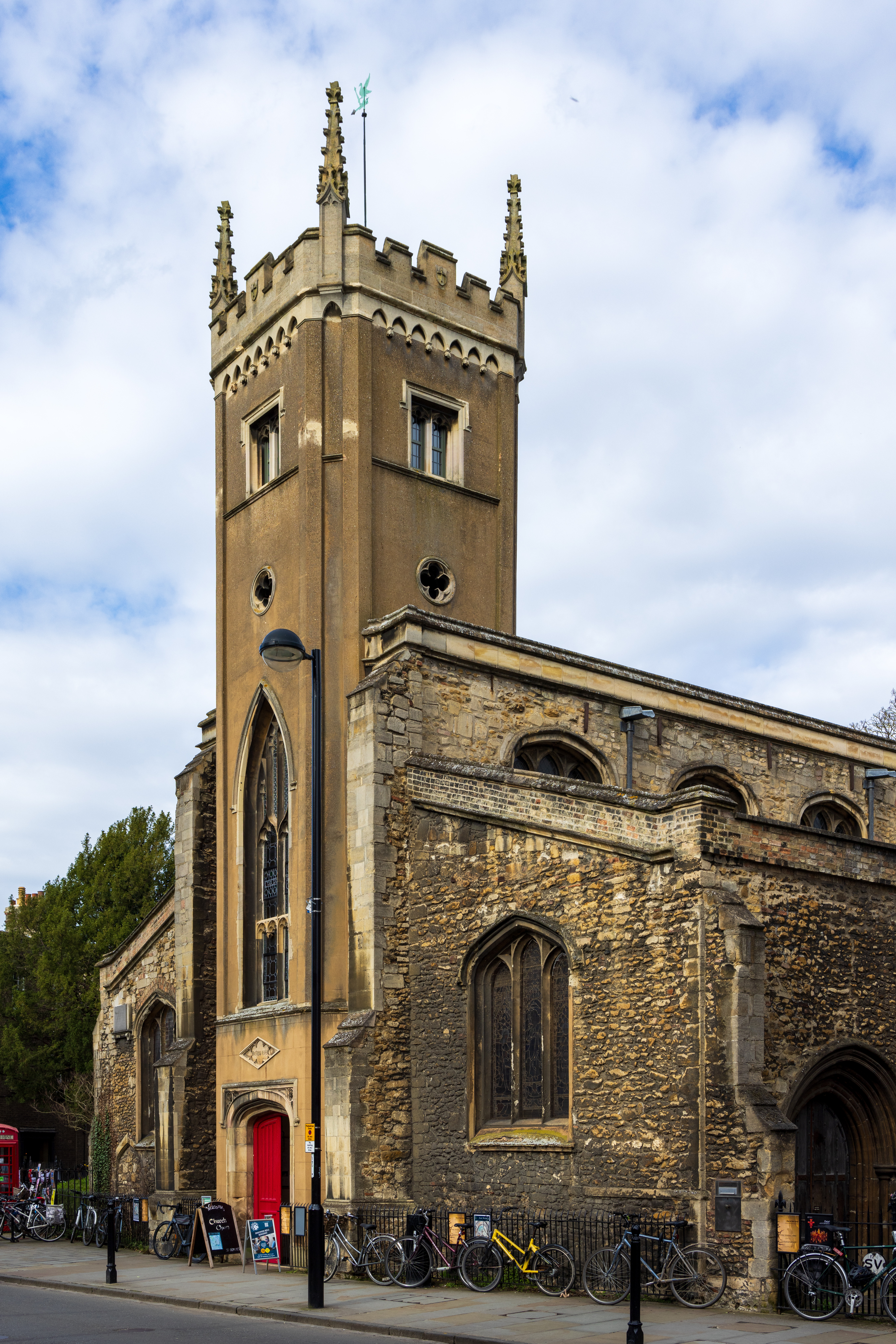
- St Clement's Church, Cambridge
- 52.2091°N 0.1180°E
- Location: Bridge Street, Cambridge, Cambridgeshire, CB2 1UF
- Country: England
- Denomination: Church of England
- Churchmanship: Prayer Book Catholic

History
- Status: Active

Architecture
- Functional status: Parish church
- Heritage designation: Grade II* listed

Administration
- Diocese: Diocese of Ely
- Archdeaconry: Archdeaconry of Cambridge
- Deanery: Cambridge North
- Parish: St Clement, Cambridge

Clergy
- Vicar: The Revd Andrew Day

St Clement's is a Church of England parish church in central Cambridge. The church is a Grade II* listed building.

== Location ==
The church is located in Bridge Street, Cambridge, part of the central Cambridge conservation area. The churchyard provides a green oasis in the street. The small parish contains many historic buildings, including the Old Vicarage, which adjoins the churchyard.

== History ==
The present church was built in the first half of the 13th century, and it is believed to be on the site of an earlier building. The walls are of rubble with some brick with freestone dressings. The building initially consisted of the four west bays of the north and south arcades of the nave. The nave arcades and South door remain from the 13th century. There is an inventory of church goods for the year 1278. The east bay of the arcades appear to have been rebuilt in the 14th century. There is an octagonal, perpendicular font. The first pier on both sides was rebuilt in 1538, the clear-story and aisle windows were added, and north and the south aisles were rebuilt and widened. The advowson passed from St Radegund's Priory to Jesus College.

The present chancel, built in brick, was added in 1726, replacing an earlier one that was demolished in 1568. It contains a fine mural of 1872 on the east wall by Frederick Leach, of Christ in Glory surrounded by angels and saints. The tower, designed by Charles Humfrey, is of cement render and initially had a spire; it was added in 1821–2, after a bequest by William Cole. Pevsner describes the tower as "somewhat silly". A vestry was built on the site of the former north chapel in 1866. The spire was removed from the tower in 1928. A chapel was created in the south aisle in 1933, with screens in Anglo-Baroque style.

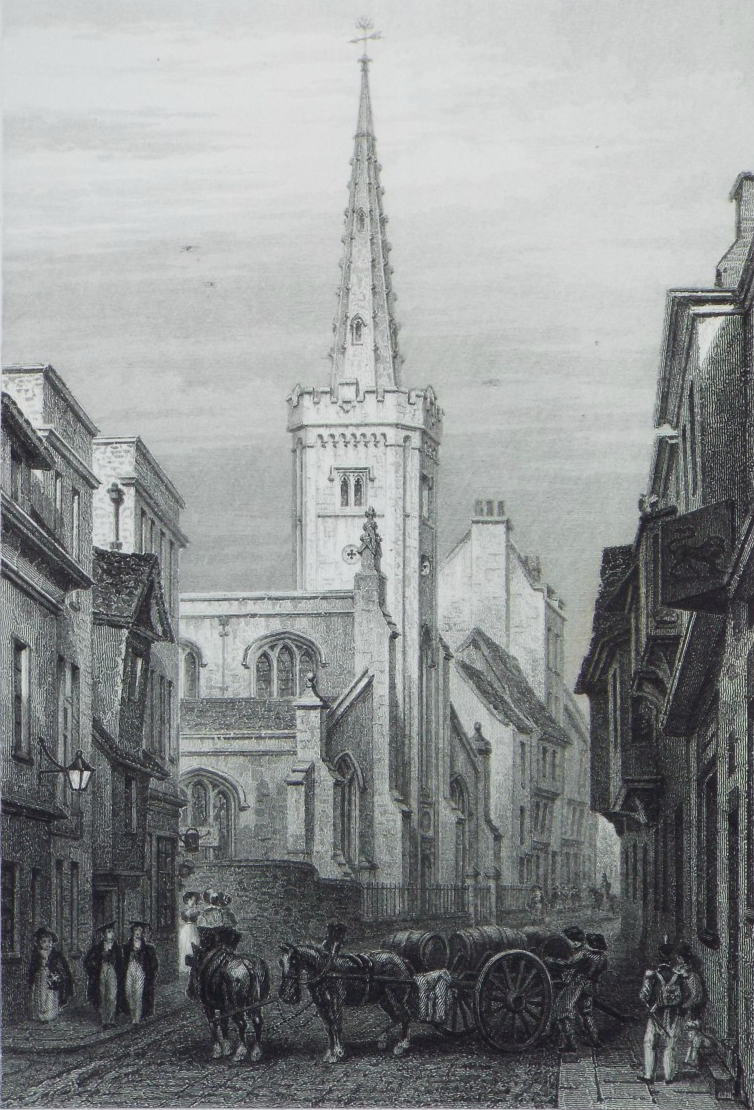
The church in the mid-19th century before the spire was removed

The church has the oldest memorial to a Mayor of Cambridge; the French inscription on the tombstone of Eudo of Helpringham who died in 1329 during his sixth mayoralty gives an early version of the modern form of the name of the town—'Caunbrege'. In the north aisle there is a beam with a carved punning inscription of c. 1538, which is thought to indicate that Thomas Brakyn, who lived in the parish at the time, contributed to the cost; he is buried in St Clement's churchyard. The church registers begin in 1560.

== History of church life ==
A notable Vicar of St Clement's was Canon Edmund Gough de Salis Wood, who served as Curate to the Revd Arthur Ward from 1865 to 1885, and then as Vicar from 1885 to 1930. He lived in the Old Vicarage, and was buried in the churchyard by special permission from the Diocese of Ely. He was a tractarian who followed ritualistic worship at St Clement's, though he adhered strictly to the Book of Common Prayer. With his brother, he founded the Society for the Maintenance of the Faith, to hold patronage for Anglo-Catholic parishes. He was also a noted authority on ecclesiastical law, and his publications include The Regal Power of the Church, Or, the Fundamentals of the Canon Law: A Dissertation, Macmillan & Bowes, 1888. The chapel in the south aisle of the church is a memorial to Canon Wood.

His successor was the barrister-priest Fr James Tait Plowden-Wardlaw, Vicar from 1931 to 1941, who often published as 'Father Clement' or 'Clement Humilis' and maintained the Anglo-Catholic tradition. His publications include Catholic Reunion: An Anglican Plea for a Uniate Patriarchate of Canterbury and for an Anglican Ultramontanism, Oxford, 1935. He was followed by Fr Cuthbert Cubitt Keet, another Anglo-Catholic, and an authority on the psalms, whose publications include A Study of the Psalms of Ascent, Mitre, 1969. Subsequent priests included the Venerable David Walser and Fr Ian McMahon.

=== Present day ===
The church housed a Greek Orthodox congregation of St Athanasios from 1968, until the congregation moved to its own church on Cherry Hinton Road. St Clement's is currently home to the Parish of St Ephraim the Syrian, an English-speaking Russian Orthodox parish of the Diocese of Sourozh.

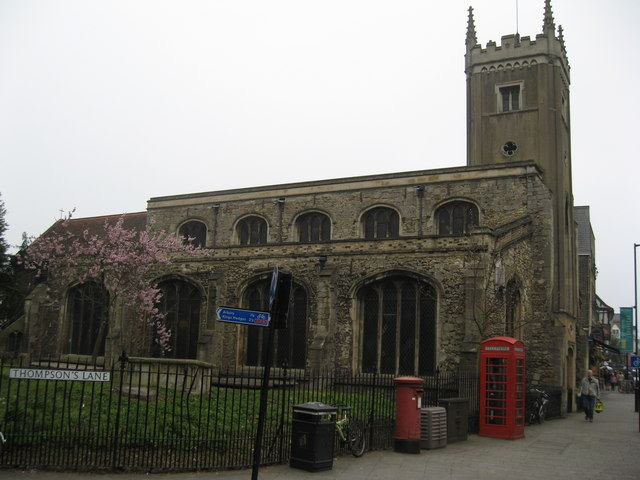
St Clement's viewed from the north

After a long vacancy, a viability plan, drawn up by a working group from the congregation, was accepted by the Bishop of Ely in December 2013. A Priest-in-Charge (Canon Nick Moir) was appointed in June 2014. The church has embarked upon a process of renewal, continuing to stand in the Prayer Book Catholic tradition of the Church of England. In 2016 the church, currently on the Heritage at Risk Register, received a £94,000 grant from the National Heritage Memorial Fund.

As a traditionalist catholic parish, the PCC of St Clement's passed resolutions A and B of the Priests (Ordination of Women) Measure 1993, rejecting the ordination of women to the priesthood. Under the 2014 House of Bishops' Declaration, the parish requested to receive alternative episcopal oversight from the Bishop of Richborough. As of 2020, it has rescinded these resolutions and remains under the episcopal care of the Bishop of Ely.

In 2022, bellringing group, the Society of Cambridge Youths, installed a ring of bells at the church.

== Clergy ==
- Laurence Chaderton
- William Cowie
- Lionel Gatford
- Arthur Ward
- James Tait Plowden-Wardlaw
