= Ralph de Werewell =

Archdeacon of Barnstaple

Ralph de Werewell was Archdeacon of Barnstaple until 1209.
