= William Elyot =

English churchman

William Elyot was an English churchman, Archdeacon of Barnstaple during 1503. He had been a Fellow of All Souls College, Oxford and rector of Blackawton.
