= Ralph (archdeacon of Barnstaple) =

Ralph was Archdeacon of Barnstaple until 1143.
