= Ronald Herniman =

Ronald George Herniman (17 August 1905 – 22 January 1998) was Archdeacon of Barnstaple from 1970 to 1988.

He was educated at Birkbeck College. He served in the RAF during World War II. Ordained in 1953, he began his career with a curacy at Christ Church, Cockfosters. After this he was Director of Philosophical Studies at Oak Hill Theological College from 1955 to 1961. He was the Rector of the Exe Valley Group of Churches from then until 1972; and after that of Shirwell with Loxhore. His widow, Grace, died in 2010.

Church of England titles
Preceded by Arthur Ward	Archdeacon of Barnstaple; 1970–1988	Succeeded by Bertram Trevor Lloyd
