= Thomas Brerwood =

Archdeacon of Barnstaple

Thomas Brerwood (died c. 1544) was Archdeacon of Barnstaple from 1528 to 1544.

He was a fellow of All Souls' College, Oxford in 1511, B.C.L. in 1511/12 and D.C.L. in 1527

He was canon of St. Paul's cathedral from 1518 to 1524, archdeacon of Barnstaple from 1528 to 1544, rector of St. Ewe from 1536 and chancellor to the Bishop of Exeter.

His will was dated 22 May 1544 and proved in March 1545.

Church of England titles
Preceded by Richard Tollett	Archdeacon of Barnstaple; 1515–1544	Succeeded by John Pollard
