= John de Bradleigh =

John de Bradleigh was the Archdeacon of Barnstaple until 1267.
