= Archdeacon of Barnstaple =

Administrative unit of the Church of England

The Archdeaconry of Barnstaple or Barum is one of the oldest archdeaconries in England. It is an administrative division of the Diocese of Exeter in the Church of England.

== History ==
The Diocese of Exeter was divided into four archdeaconries in Norman times, probably during the bishopric of Osbern FitzOsbern (1072–1103):

- Exeter
- Barnstaple
- Totnes
- Cornwall

In 1782, it was noted that the archdeaconry contained the deaneries of Barum (Barnstaple), Chumleigh, Hertland, Shirwell, South Molton and Torrington.

The archdeaconry currently comprises the following deaneries:

- Deanery of Barnstaple
- Deanery of Hartland
- Deanery of Holsworthy
- Deanery of Shirwell
- Deanery of South Molton
- Deanery of Torrington

== List of archdeacons ==
The list of archdeacons is from the Fasti Ecclesiae Anglicanae 1300-1541: Volume 9, Exeter Diocese.

=== High Medieval ===
- Allured (first archdeacon)
- ?–1143: Ralph (I)
- c. 1155: William de Auco
- bef. c. 1184–aft. c. 1185: Roger
- bef. 1203–?: Thomas
- 30 September 1209–?: Ralph de Werewell
- John
- bef. c. 1219–?: Ralph (II)
- ?–8 February 1227 (d.): Isaac
- Walter de Pembroke (afterwards Archdeacon of Totnes)
- 21 January 1263 – 1264: Henry de Bracton
- 25 May 1264–?: Richard Blund (afterwards Archdeacon of Totnes;

possibly son of Richard Blund, Bishop of Exeter)

- 6 November 1265–May 1267: Godfrey Giffard (also Archdeacon of Wells from 1267; later Bishop of Worcester)
- May 1267–?: John de Bradleigh
- January 1271–?: Thomas de Hertford
- 28 August 1279–?: Philip of Exon

=== Late Medieval ===
- ?–1308: Ralph Germeyn
- 13 October 1308 – 1309: William Melton (later Archbishop of York)
- 4 January 1309 – 1309: William Fitsrogo
- 30 March 1309 – 1312: John Wele
- ? ("a short time"): Bartholomew de Sancto Laurentio
- 26 March 1312 – 3 December 1314 (res.): Walter Giffard
- 7 February 1315 – 1318 (d.): Richard de Morcester (afterwards Archdeacon of Exeter)
- 22 September 1318 – 1329: Richard de Wideslade
- 10/15 December 1329 – 1330: William Zouche
- 17 December 1330 – 1349: John de Nassington
- 8 April 1350 – 1351: John de Reynham
- c. 1352: Hugh de Monyton
- 23 February 1355 – 2 September 1358: John de Derby
- 2 September 1358–c. 1367: William de Mugge
- bef. 1371 or 23 February 1384–c. 1387: Henry Whitefield
- bef. 1395 or 8 September 1399 – 1400: Robert Rygge
- 17/22 August 1400 – 1400: Richard Aldtyngton
- 1 November 1400 – 1429 (res.): John Orum
- 2 August 1429 – 1442 (d.): John Waryn
- 3 August 1442 – 1445 (res.): Richard Helyer
- 16 June 1445 – 1449 (res.): Michael Tregury (afterwards Archbishop of Dublin)
- 25 January 1450 – 1459: Roger Keys
- 12 July 1462–October 1475 (d.): William Fulford
- 27 October 1475 – 1476 (res.): John Stubbes
- 10 December 1476 – 1478 (res.): Owen Lord
- 18 February 1478 – 8 October 1485 (d.): Robert Barforth
- bef. 1492–c. 1506: William Elyot
- ?–1508: John Vesey (later Dean of Windsor and Bishop of Exeter)
- 3 August 1508–c. 1512: Richard Norton
- c. 1512–1515 (res.): John Young
- 12 April 1515 – 1518 (d.): John Tyake
- 19 January 1518 – 26 April 1528 (d.): Richard Tollett
- 26 April 1528 – 29 May 1544 (d.): Thomas Brerwood

=== Early modern ===
- 16 June 1544 – 1554 (deprived): John Pollard (also Archdeacon of Wilts until 1544, Archdeacon of Cornwall until 1545)
- 20 April 1554 – 1582 (res.): Henry Squire
- 7 January 1583 – 1585: Robert Lawe
- 24 April 1585 – 1605: William Tooker
- 27 November 1605 – 21 November 1645 (d.): William Helyar
- 1645–1660: Vacancy during the English Commonwealth.
- 31 August 1660 – 1662: James Smith
- 1662–1679 (d.): Joshua Tucker
- 29 August 1679 – 1703 (d.): William Read
- 24 September 1703 – 1709 (d.): Robert Burscough
- 9 September 1709 – 11 August 1724 (d.): Thomas Lynford (also Canon of Westminster)
- 1724–1731: Lewis Stephens (afterwards Archdeacon of Chester)
- 28 October 1731 – 1744 (d.): John Grant
- 16 March 1745 – 26 October 1791 (d.): William Hole
- 3 November 1791 – 1798 (d.): Roger Massey
- 14 March 1798 – 3 July 1799 (d.): John Andrew
- 25 July 1799 – 28 June 1805 (d.): Peregrine Ilbert
- 16 August 1805–? (res.): Jonathan Fisher
- 3 November 1807 – 1826 (d.): Thomas Johnes
- 1826–1830 (res.): John Bull
- 1830–1847: George Barnes
- 1847–1865: John Bartholomew

=== Late modern ===
- 1865–1885: Henry Woollcombe
- 1885–1890: Herbert Barnes
- 1890–24 December 1908 (d.): Albert Seymour
- 1908–9 July 1930 (d.): Robert Trefusis, Bishop of Crediton
- 1930–26 June 1935 (d.): Frank Jones
- 1935–1945: Edgar Hay
- 1946–1958: Denis James
- 1958–1962: Guy Sanderson
- 1962–1970: Arthur Ward (afterwards Archdeacon of Exeter)
- 1970–1988: Ronald Herniman
- 1989–2002 (ret.): Trevor Lloyd
- 2003–2014 (ret.): David Gunn-Johnson
- 1 September 2014 – 2015: Mike Edson (Acting)
- 23 March 2014 – 6 September 2020: Mark Butchers
- September 2021 onwards: Verena Breed

== Sources ==
- Le Neve, John; Hardy, Sir Thomas Duffus (1854). Archdeacons of Barum or Barnstaple . Fasti ecclesiae Anglicanae. Vol. 1. Oxford: Oxford University Press. pp. 405–408 – via Wikisource.
- Horn, Joyce M. (1964), Fasti Ecclesiae Anglicanae 1300–1541, vol. 9, pp. 19–21
- Gribble, Joseph Besly–Memorials of Barnstaple: being an attempt to supply the want of a history of that ancient borough; 1830; pp 483–486 (Google eBook)
