= Thomas (archdeacon of Barnstaple) =

Thomas was Archdeacon of Barnstaple until 1203.
