= John Darby =

John Darby may refer to:

- John Darby (NASCAR official), NASCAR Sprint Cup Series director
- John Fletcher Darby (1803–1882), American politician
- John M. Darby, botanist (1804–1877), American academic and chemist
- John Nelson Darby (1800–1882), 19th-century Anglo-Irish evangelist and religious writer
- John Darby (Dean of Chester) (1831–1919), Anglican priest
- John Darby (printer) (died 1704), English printer

== Fictional ==
- Darby and Joan, a character in this poem

== See also ==
- John Derby (disambiguation)
