= Denis James =

Denis James was Archdeacon of Barnstaple from 1946 to 1958.

James was born on 3 May 1895 and educated at Cirencester Grammar School. He served in the Indian Army during World War I and was ordained after a period of study at Salisbury Theological College in 1923. He served curacies at Carisbrooke in the Isle of Wight and Portsea, Portsmouth; and held incumbencies in Gosport and Retford before his years as an Archdeacon.

He died on 28 July 1965.

== Notes ==
Church of England titles
Preceded by Edgar Hay	Archdeacon of Barnstaple; 1946–1958	Succeeded by Wilfrid Guy Sanderson
