= John Grant (priest) =

John Grant (died c.1744) was Archdeacon of Barnstaple from 1731 to 1744.

He was an investor in the slave-trading Royal African Company, selling shares worth £250 (equivalent to £47,500 in 2025) on 23 January 1724.

Church of England titles
Preceded by Lewis Stephens	Archdeacon of Barnstaple; 1731–1744	Succeeded by William Hole
