= Thomas Lynford =

Thomas Lynford (died 1724) was Archdeacon of Barnstaple.

He was a fellow of Christ's College, Cambridge, graduating B.A. in 1670/1 and M.A. in 1674 and B.D. in 1689.

He was rector of St. Edmund, Lombard Street, London and chaplain in ordinary to William III and Queen Mary. He was canon of Westminster Abbey from 1700 to 1724 and archdeacon of Barnstaple from 1709 until c.1731.

He had been licensed in 1689 to marry Elizabeth Dingham of St. Giles-in-the-Fields, London.
