= John Young (suffragan bishop in London) =

English churchman and academic

John Young or Yonge (1463–1526) was an English churchman and academic. He was titular bishop of Callipolis as suffragan bishop to Richard FitzJames, the bishop of London; and from 1514 his archdeacon of London. He was also Dean of Chichester; and Warden of New College, Oxford, from 1521. He has often been confused with others of the same name, in particular John Yonge.
