= William de Mugge =

Archdeacon of Barnstaple

William de Mugge was the Archdeacon of Barnstaple during 1358.
