= The Baron of Beef =

Pub in Cambridge, England

Coordinates: 52.209°N 0.118°E

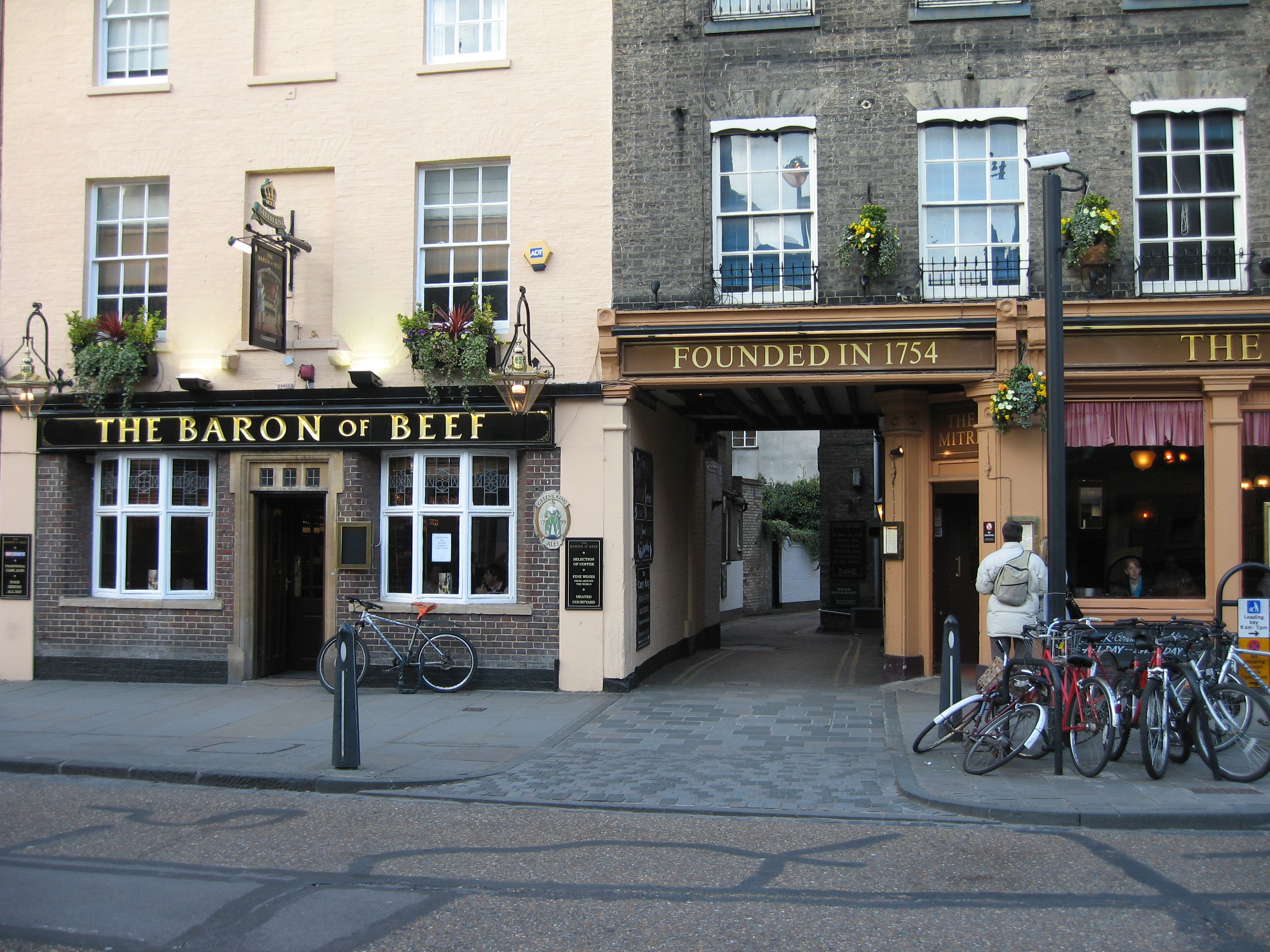
The Baron of Beef public house on Bridge Street

The Baron of Beef is a pub in Bridge Street, Cambridge, England, owned by Bob Jones.

Michael Peacock, columnist of the Town Crier, gave his former paper, the Daily Mirror, a story about Chris Curry and Clive Sinclair having a fight there. This was allegedly over Curry's decision to leave Sinclair to join Hermann Hauser to establish Acorn Computers in competition with Sinclair's ZX80 microcomputer. This was dramatised in the 2009 BBC Four television programme Micro Men.

Tom Baker, the Doctor Who actor, stayed at The Baron of Beef while filming Shada.

Douglas Adams, creator of The Hitchhiker's Guide to the Galaxy, drank at The Baron of Beef also, according to an interview on The South Bank Show.
