= Philip of Exon =

Philip of Exon was Archdeacon of Barnstaple until 1279.
