= Schellekens =

Schellekens is a Dutch (mostly patronymic) surname. Schelleken was a diminutive of Germanic names like Schalk and Godschalk (=God's servant) in North Brabant. Dutch surnames similarly derived are Schalken, Schel(l), Schellen, Schellens, and Scheltens. People with these surnames include:

Schellekens

- Anne Schellekens (born 1986), Dutch rower
- Elisabeth Schellekens (born 1970s), British philosopher
- Harry Schellekens (born 1952), Dutch football goalkeeper
- Imke Schellekens (born 1977), Dutch equestrian
- Maarten Schellekens, possible birth name of Martinus Becanus (1563–1624), Jesuit theologian
- Paul Schellekens (born 1951), Dutch civil servant and diplomat

Schalken, Schalcken

- Godfried Schalcken (1643–1706), Dutch genre and portrait painter
- Sjeng Schalken (born 1976), Dutch tennis player

Schellens

- Gerrits Schellens (born 1966), Belgian triathlete

Scheltens

- Philip Scheltens (born 1957), Dutch neurologist

== See also ==
- Schalk
- Schell, a surname with several origins
