= Henry Whitefield =

Henry Whitefield was the Archdeacon of Barnstaple from 1371 to 1384.
