= Richard Blund (archdeacon of Barnstaple) =

Richard Blund was Archdeacon of Barnstaple from 1264 to 1265.

== Notes ==
Church of England titles
Preceded by Henry de Bracton	Archdeacon of Barnstaple; 1264–1265	Succeeded by Godfrey Giffard
