= John Pollard (priest) =

Archdeacon

John Pollard was a 16th-century Archdeacon of Wiltshire, Archdeacon of Cornwall, Archdeacon of Barnstaple and Archdeacon of Totnes.

He was one of eleven sons of Sir Lewis Pollard (c.1465–1526) of King's Nympton, Devon, MP for Totnes and Justice of the Common Pleas, by his wife Agnes Hext. He was educated at Oxford University and graduated B.A. in 1522/3 and M.A. in 1526.

He was vicar of Minety and archdeacon of Wiltshire in 1539, until deprived under Queen Mary in 1544. He was prebendary of Brecon 1542–51, archdeacon of Cornwall from 1543 to 1545, rector of Portishead, Somerset (1543–1550) and archdeacon of Barnstaple in 1544 (until deprived under Mary I in 1554). He was rector of Ermington mediety 1545–1554, of Widdicombe (or Withycombe) 1549–1560 and of Newton Ferrers in 1553–1556, rector of Wheatfield, Oxfordshire, 1553–1577, canon of Sarum 1556–1559 and archdeacon of Totnes in 1558.

Church of England titles
Preceded by Thomas Brerwood	Archdeacon of Barnstaple; 1544–1554	Succeeded by Henry Squire
