= James Plowden-Wardlaw =

English barrister and priest

James Tait Plowden-Wardlaw KC (1873 – 19 November 1963) was a barrister and a priest of the Church of England.

James Tait Wardlaw was born in 1873, baptized on 28 Jan 1874, the son of James Campbell Wardlaw of Shanklin, Isle of Wight, and his second wife Augusta Ellen Chichele-Plowden. He assumed the surname Plowden-Wardlaw by deed poll on 25 Feb 1901. He was educated at Malvern College and King's College, Cambridge, where he gained the degree Master of Arts in March 1900.

He was called to the Bar (Lincoln's Inn) in 1901. He served as an advocate in the Supreme Court of the Cape Colony, South Africa in 1901 and of the Transvaal, 1903. He was Public Prosecutor of Pretoria, 1902.

He was ordained a priest in 1911. He was first a curate at St George's Church, Beckenham and then chaplain of St Edward's, Cambridge, 1913–17. He served as a chaplain with the Royal Army Chaplains' Department, 1916–18. He was rector of St George's, Beckenham, 1919–25, chaplain of St Paul's, Cannes, 1928–9, and vicar of St Clement's Church, Cambridge, 1931–41.

Plowden-Wardlaw retired to Cambridge in 1953, and died 10 years later.

He married, 1904, Edith Hay, second daughter of Richard Frederick Fotheringham Campbell, MP for Ayr Burghs, and had issue.

Ivan Clutterbuck recalls Plowden-Wardlaw at Beckenham: "He was an excellent preacher, no doubt due to his legal training. He did not cease demonstrating that the Church of England was a lawful part of the universal Catholic Church and our worship faithfully reflected this."

== Publications ==
Among Plowden-Wardlaw's publications (some issued under the pseudonyms Father Clement or Clement Humilis) are:

- The Test of War
- (contributor) Religious Reconstruction after the War: a Cambridge programme (1916)
- Catholic reunion: an Anglican plea for a uniate Patriarchate of Canterbury and for an Anglican ultramontanism
- Service Book (St George's Beckenham). Published by the Society of SS Peter and Paul (1923)
- Vox Dilecti..Messages from the Master. (1931)
- Vox Domini
- Daily Messages from the Master (1933)
- [https://archive.org/details/supplement-to-the-missal Supplement to the Missal: The Proper of Masses in Commemoration of Thirty-nine Beati of the Anglican Communion (London: W. Knott & Son, 1933)
