= Richard de Morcester =

Richard de Morcester was an Archdeacon in the Diocese of Exeter from 1315 to 1318.

He was Archdeacon of Barnstaple from 1315 to 1318 and Archdeacon of Exeter in 1318.

Church of England titles
Preceded by William Fitsrogo	Archdeacon of Barnstaple; 1315–1318	Succeeded by Walter Giffard
Preceded by Richard de Coleton	Archdeacon of Exeter; 2 February 1318 –11 June 1318	Succeeded by Thomas de Hereward
