= Robert Burscough =

English divine

Robert Burscough (1651 –July 1709) was an English divine.

The son of Thomas Burscough, he was born at Cartmel, Lancashire, in 1651. He entered Queen's College, Oxford, as servitor in 1668, and took his B.A. in 1672 and M.A. in 1682. In 1681 he was presented by Charles II of England to the vicarage of St Mary's Church, Totnes, Devonshire, in succession to John Prince, author of the Worthies of Devon. He was prebendary of Exeter Cathedral in 1701, and archdeacon of Barnstaple in 1703. He was buried at Bath on 29 July 1709. He is characterised by Anthony à Wood as "a learned man, zealous for the church of England, and very exemplary in his life and conversation."

Notable works include A Treatise of Church Government, occasion'd by some letters lately printed concerning the same subject (1692), A Discourse of Schism; addressed to those Dissenters who conformed before the Toleration and have since withdrawn themselves from the communion of the Church of England (1699), A Vindication of the “Discourse of Schism, Exeter, (1701), A Discourse of the Unity of the Church, of the Separation of the Dissenters from the Church of England, of their Setting up Churches, Exeter, (1704) and A Vindication of the Twenty-third Article of Religion (1702).

It has been said that William Burscough, Bishop of Limerick, Ardfert and Aghadoe from 1725 until 1755, was his son, but such a connection between the two men is not supported by evidence.
