= John Yonge =

English ecclesiastic and diplomat (c. 1465–1516)

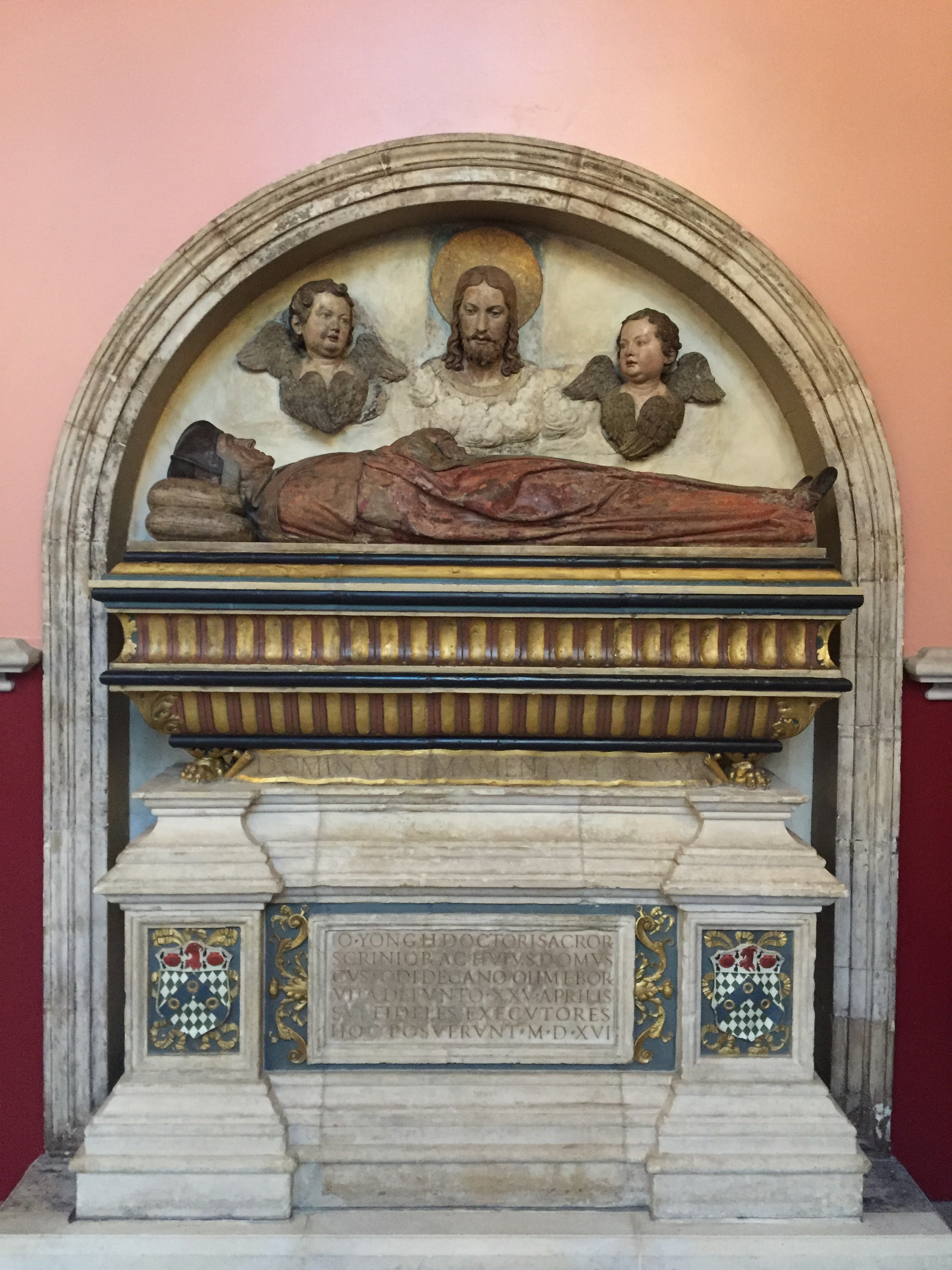
Tomb monument of John Yonge in the Maughan Library, King's College London

John Yonge (c. 1465 – 25 April 1516) was an English ecclesiastic and diplomatist, who also served as Master of the Rolls from 1507 until his death.

He is not to be confused with his contemporary John Young (suffragan bishop in London) (1463–1526).

== Life ==
John Yonge was born at Upper Heyford, Oxfordshire, and educated at Winchester and New College, Oxford, where he became a fellow in 1485. Probably the son of John Yonge, Lord Mayor of London (elected 1466), he was ordained in 1500 and held several livings (and the office of Archdeacon of Barnstaple) before receiving his first diplomatic mission to arrange a commercial treaty with the archduke of Austria in 1504, and in the Low Countries in 1506 in connection with the projected marriage between Henry VII and Margaret of Savoy.

In 1507 he was made Master of the Rolls, and in the following year was employed in various diplomatic missions. He was one of the ambassadors who arranged the Holy League in 1513, and accompanied Henry VIII during the ensuing campaign. He was on terms of close friendship with Dean Colet, and was a correspondent of Erasmus.

In 1514 he was made dean of York in succession to Wolsey, and in 1515 he was one of the commissioners for renewing the peace with Francis I. In the same year he became archdeacon of Barnstaple.

Yonge died in London on 25 April 1516. His effigial tomb monument is in the former Rolls Chapel, now part of the Maughan Library, King's College London.

== Arms ==
The arms pictured here relate to John Yonge, Somerset Herald and are not those pictured above on the tomb of John Yonge.

Coat of arms of John Yonge
Escutcheon Azure, 3 griffins segreant argent, beaks & claws gules.
