= Arthur Ward (cricketer) =

English cricketer, cricket administrator, and clergyman

Personal information
- Full name: Arthur Robert Ward
- Born: 29 December 1829; Bloomsbury, London, England
- Died: 25 September 1884 (aged 54); Cambridge, Cambridgeshire, England
- Batting: Unknown
- Relatives: William Ward (father); Henry Ward (brother); Matthew Ward (brother)

Domestic team information
- Years: Team
- 1852–1854: Cambridge University
- 1853–1854: Marylebone Cricket Club

Career statistics
Competition	First-class
Matches	12
Runs scored	226
Batting average	11.30
100s/50s	–/1
Top score	53*
Catches/stumpings	4/–
- Source: Cricinfo, 25 January 2023

Arthur Robert Ward (29 December 1829 – 25 September 1884) was an English clergyman, cricketer and cricket administrator who played in 12 first-class cricket matches for Cambridge University and amateur sides in the 1850s. He was born at Bloomsbury in London and died at Cambridge.

Ward was the son of William Ward, a director of the Bank of England, Member of Parliament for the City of London and himself a famous cricketer. He was educated at St John's College, Cambridge and graduated from Cambridge University in 1855 with a Bachelor of Arts degree, which converted to a Master of Arts in 1858.

As a cricketer, Ward was a middle-order batsman, though it is not known whether he was right- or left-handed. His best innings was an unbeaten 53 for Cambridge University against the Marylebone Cricket Club (MCC) in 1853, and that year he also won a Blue by appearing in the University Match against Oxford University. He should have had a second Blue in 1854 as he was captain of the Cambridge University team, but he missed the University Match through illness. In addition to games for Cambridge University, he also played in 1853 and 1854 for the MCC and in 1853 for a "Gentlemen of England" side.

After graduating from Cambridge, Ward was ordained as a deacon in the Church of England and then as a priest, both in 1856. He served as curate at All Saints' Church, Cambridge to 1860, and from then until his death in 1884 as vicar of St Clement's Church, also in Cambridge. He maintained his links with Cambridge University cricket, serving as President between 1873 and 1884, during which time he also served as treasurer to his death. Many years after his death, The Times published a reminiscent letter from the eminent late Victorian cricketer C. I. Thornton which recalled Ward as a "very stout" man and remarked on his capacity for refreshment: "At a big dinner... Ward took 11 bottles Apollinaris [German carbonated water], two bottles champagne, one bottle port. It had no deleterious effect on him at all."
