= Plymtree =

- Village and civil parish
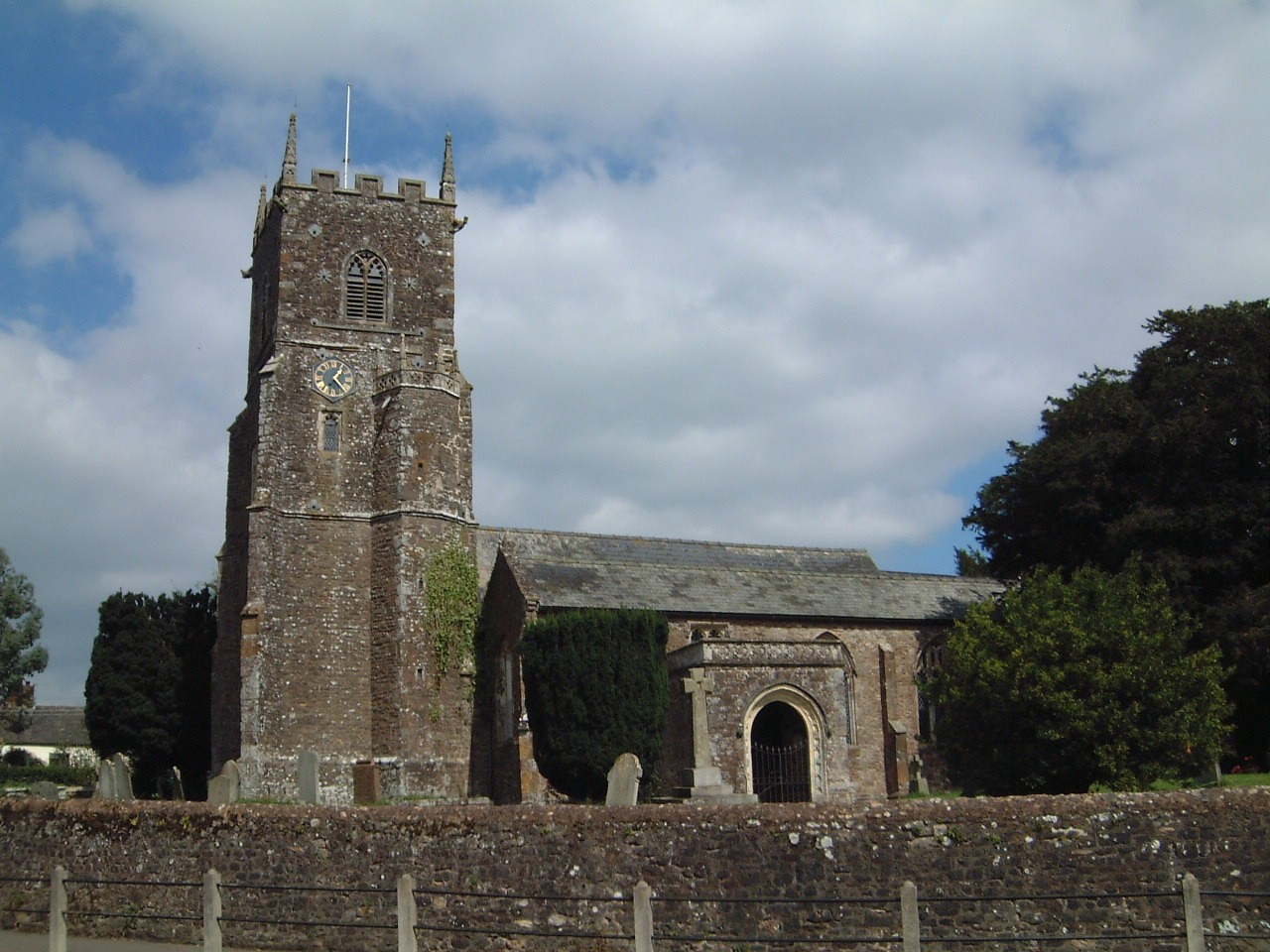
- St John's Church, Plymtree
- Interactive map of Plymtree
- Coordinates: 50°49′N 3°21′W
- Country: England
- County: Devon

Population (2001)
  - Total: 605
- Website: plymtree.org.uk

Plymtree is a small village and civil parish about 3.5 miles south of the town of Cullompton in the county of Devon, England. The parish is surrounded, clockwise from the north, by the parishes of Broadhembury, Payhembury, Clyst Hydon and Cullompton. In 2001 it had a population of 605, compared to 359 in 1901.

The village has a public house called The Blacksmith Arms and a Church of England primary school (https://plymtree-primary.devon.sch.uk/devon/primary/plymtree) which is part of the Culm Valley Federation with Kentisbeare and Culmstock Schools. There is a small community run village shop and post office, a village hall, playground and recreation field. The yearly country fayre is held on the August Bank Holiday which raises funds for the Village Hall and local Riding for the Disabled Group. It has a cricket club and tennis court.

== Parish church ==
St John the Baptist's church is medieval; the tower and the south aisle are Perpendicular but the nave and chancel are older. The rood screen is a splendid example and exceptionally well preserved. It incorporates emblems which indicate that it was given by Isabel widow of Humphrey Stafford, Earl of Devon, who was beheaded in 1469. The wainscoting is painted with figures but they are not of high aesthetic value. There is a small alabaster relief of the Resurrection of Christ which is Flemish work of about 1600. In the churchyard of St John the Baptist's church is a historic yew tree.

The first known English personification of Christmas was associated with merry-making, singing and drinking. A carol attributed to Richard Smart, Rector of Plymtree from 1435 to 1477, has 'Sir Christemas' announcing the news of Christ's birth and encouraging his listeners to drink: "Buvez bien par toute la compagnie, / Make good cheer and be right merry, / And sing with us now joyfully: Nowell, nowell."

== Notable people ==
In 1832 Joseph Dornford was presented by his Oxford college to the rectory of Plymtree, and in 1847 he was collated by Henry Phillpotts a prebendary of Exeter Cathedral. He died at Plymtree on 18 January 1868, aged 74.

== Historic estates ==
The parish of Plymtree contains various historic estates including:

- Fordmore, anciently Ford's Moore, from before 1161 to 1702 the seat of the at Ford (later "Ford") family.
- Plymtree Manor.
- Woodbeer Court.
