= Arthur Ward (priest) =

Arthur Frederick Ward (23 April 1912 – October 1998) was Archdeacon of Barnstaple from 1962 to 1970 and Archdeacon of Exeter from 1970 to 1981.

== Early life ==
Ward was born in 1912 and educated at Armstrong College, Newcastle. He began his ordained ministry as a curate at St Michael's Byker. He was then an incumbent at Harpurhey, Nelson-in-Marsden, Paignton and Shirwell with Loxhore.

== Notes ==
Church of England titles
Preceded by Richard Babington	Archdeacon of Barnstaple; 1962–1970	Succeeded by Ronald George Herniman
Preceded by Wilfrid Guy Sanderson	Archdeacon of Exeter; 1970–1981	Succeeded by John Richards
