= John de Derby =

14th-century England priest

John de Derby was Archdeacon of Barnstaple from 1355 to 1358.
