= Hugh de Monyton =

Hugh de Monyton was the Archdeacon of Barnstaple during 1352.
