= Richard Aldtyngton =

Archdeacon of Barnstaple, England, in 1400

Richard Aldtyngton (or Allerton) was briefly the Archdeacon of Barnstaple, England in 1400.
