= William Hole (priest) =

Archdeacon of Barnstaple

William Hole, MA (1710–1791) Vicar of Bishops Nympton was Archdeacon of Barnstaple from 16 March 1745 to 26 October 1791.

Church of England titles
Preceded by John Grant	Archdeacon of Barnstaple; 1745–1791	Succeeded by Roger Massey
