= William Fulford =

William Fulford was Archdeacon of Barnstaple from 1462 until 1475.
