= Jonathan Fisher (priest) =

Jonathan Parker Fisher (baptised 28 September 1757 – 31 July 1838) was Archdeacon of Barnstaple during 1805: he was later Sub-Dean of Exeter Cathedral.

He was the son of Rev. John Fisher and Elizabeth Fisher. His elder brother was Rev. John Fisher, Bishop of Salisbury. He was educated at Charterhouse School in Surrey. and University College, Oxford (BA, 1778; MA, 1780; BD, 1802; DD, 1807). He died at the rectory in Farringdon, Devonshire, aged 81.
