= William Tooker =

English churchman, Dean of Lichfield

William Tooker (or Tucker) (Exeter, 1557 or 1558 – 19 March 1621) was an English churchman and theological writer, who was archdeacon of Barnstaple and later dean of Lichfield.

== Life ==
Born at Exeter in 1557 or 1558, he was the third son of William Tooker of that town by his wife Honora, daughter of James Erisey of Erisey in Cornwall. He was admitted to Winchester College in 1572, and became a scholar at New College, Oxford, in 1575, graduating B.A. on 16 Oct. 1579 and M.A. on 1 June 1583, and proceeding B.D. and D.D. on 4 July 1594. In 1577 he was elected to a perpetual fellowship, and in 1580 was appointed a canon of Exeter. In 1584 he was presented to the rectory of Kilkhampton in Cornwall, and in the following year resigned his fellowship on being collated archdeacon of Barnstaple on 24 April.

In 1588 he was appointed chaplain to Elizabeth I and rector of West Dean in Wiltshire. In 1590 he became rector of Clovelly in Devon, but resigned the charge in 1601. On 16 February 1605 he was installed dean of Lichfield, resigning his archdeaconry. According to Thomas Fuller, James I intended the bishopric of Gloucester for him, and actually issued the congé d'élire, but afterwards revoked it. Tooker died at Salisbury on 19 March 1620 or 1621, and was buried in the cathedral. He left a son Robert, who in 1625 became rector of Vange in Essex.

== Works ==
Tooker was a good scholar, and, according to Fuller, 'the purity of his Latin pen procured his preferment.' He was also a skilful courtier in his choice of topics. In 1597 he published Charisma sive Donum Sanationis (London), a historical vindication of the power inherent in the English sovereign of curing the king's evil. This work won him especial regard from Elizabeth I, whose possession of the power was a proof of the validity of her succession. Tooker traced the healing power back to (the legendary) Lucius of Britain; but he rejected the contemporary beliefs about touch pieces as superstitions.

In 1604 he published a treatise entitled Of the Fabrique of the Church and Churchmens Livings (London), dedicated to James I, whose chaplain he was, in which he attacked the tendency of puritanism towards ecclesiastical democracy, on the ground that it preceded spiritual anarchy. Besides the works mentioned, he was the author of Duellum sive Singulare Certamen cum Martino Becano Jesuita (London, 1611), written against Martin Becanus in the allegiance oath controversy, in defence of the ecclesiastical authority of the English king, to which Becanus replied in Duellum Martini Becani Societatis Jesu Theologi cum Gulielmo Tooker de Primatu Regis Angliae, Mainz 1612.
