= Joshua Tucker =

Joshua Tucker (died 1690) was Archdeacon of Barnstaple.

He was the son of Thomas Tucker, of South Molton, Devon and studied at Exeter College, Oxford, matriculating in 1626/7, graduating B.A. in 1629/30 and M.A. in 1633.

He was rector of High Bickington, Devon, 1647. He was canon of Salisbury Cathedral in 1660 and collated archdeacon of Barnstaple in 1662, serving until his death.

His will was proved in 1679. He had been licensed as a widower to marry Frances Joyner, a widow of Greenwich, Kent.
