= Henry Woollcombe =

Henry Woollcombe (or Woolcombe; 26 March 1813 – 4 June 1885) was an Anglican clergyman who was Archdeacon of Barnstaple from 1865 until his death. A Graduate of Christ Church, Oxford, he held incumbencies at Kingsteignton and Heavitree. He was born in Broadhembury, Devon, the eldest son of Henry Woollcombe.

Church of England titles
| Preceded by John Bartholomew | Archdeacon of Barnstaple; 1865–1885 | Succeeded by Herbert Barnes |
