= Hugh Oldham =

English cleric, Bishop of Exeter and patron of education (c.1452–1519)

The Right Reverend Hugh Oldham
- Bishop of Exeter
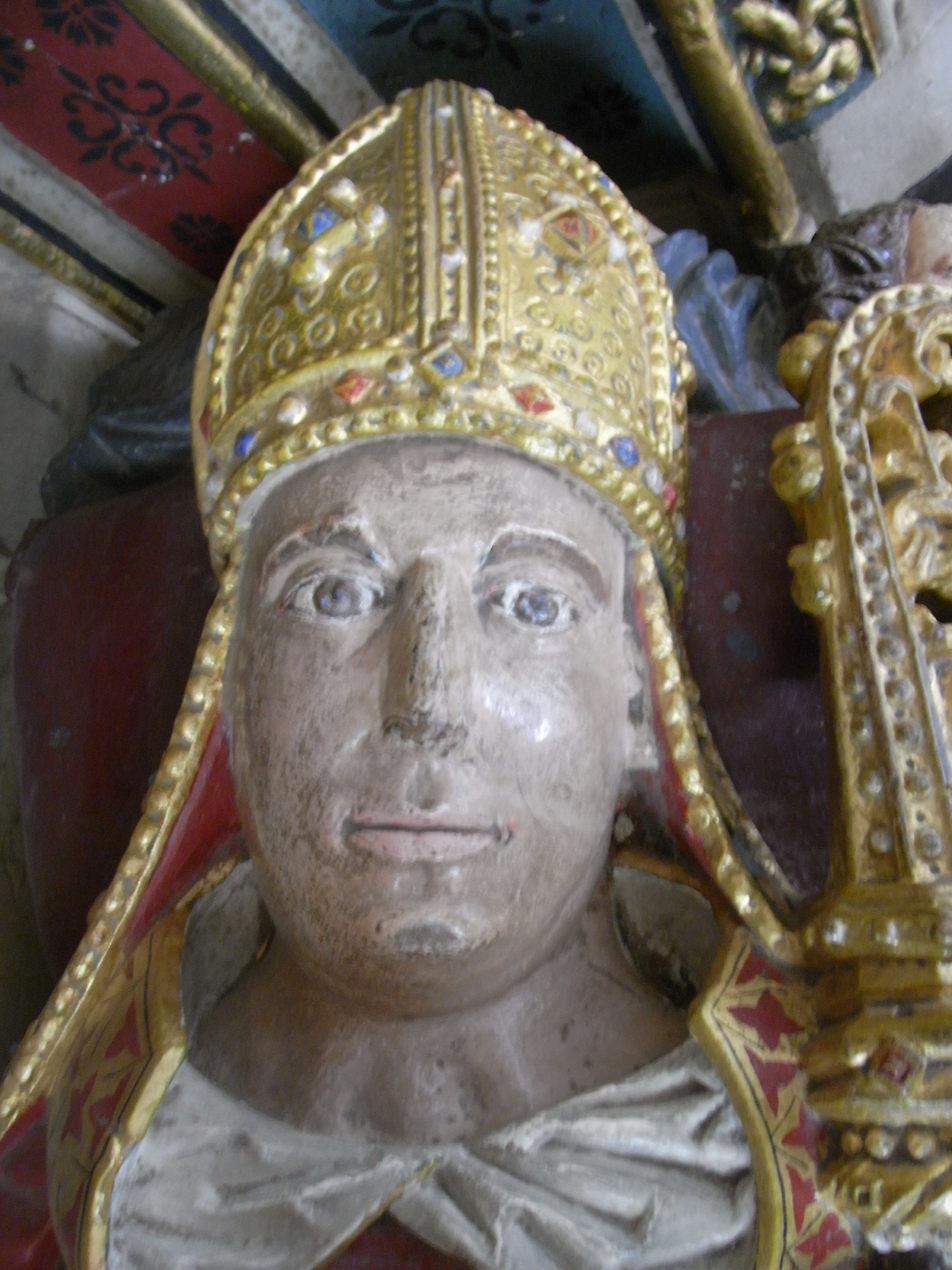
- Effigy of Hugh Oldham (d. 1519), Bishop of Exeter, Oldham Chapel, south aisle, Exeter Cathedral
- Church: Roman Catholic
- See: Exeter
- Installed: 12 January 1505
- Term ended: 25 June 1519
- Predecessor: John Arundel
- Successor: John Vesey

Orders
- Consecration: 5 January 1505 by William Warham

Personal details
- Born: c. 1452 Lancashire, England
- Died: 25 June 1519 Exeter, Devon
- Buried: Exeter Cathedral

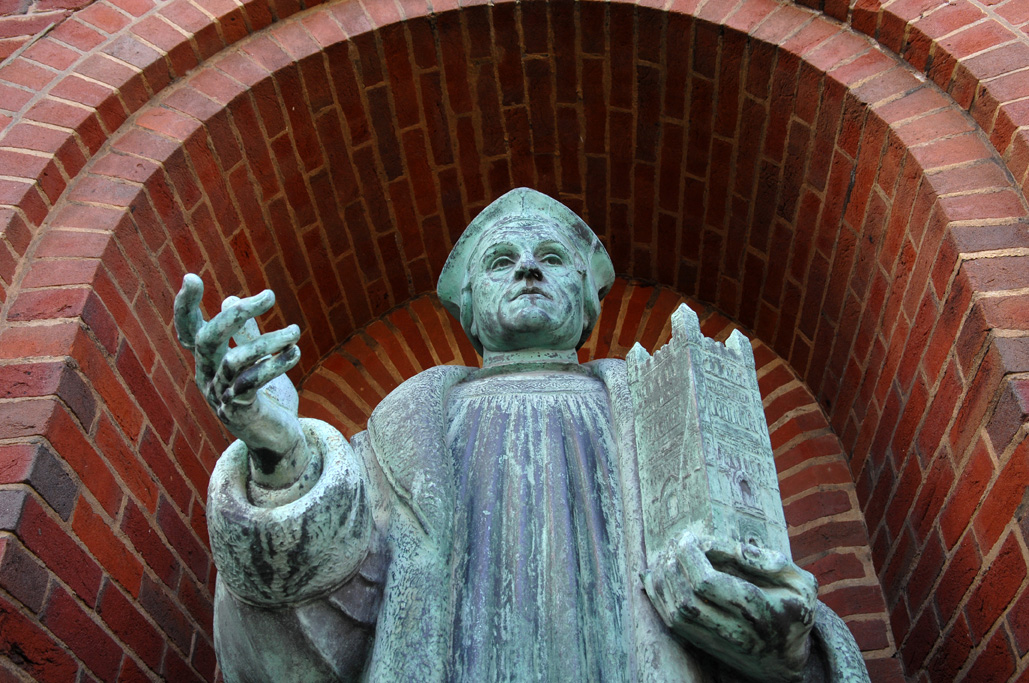
Statue of Hugh Oldham at The Manchester Grammar School

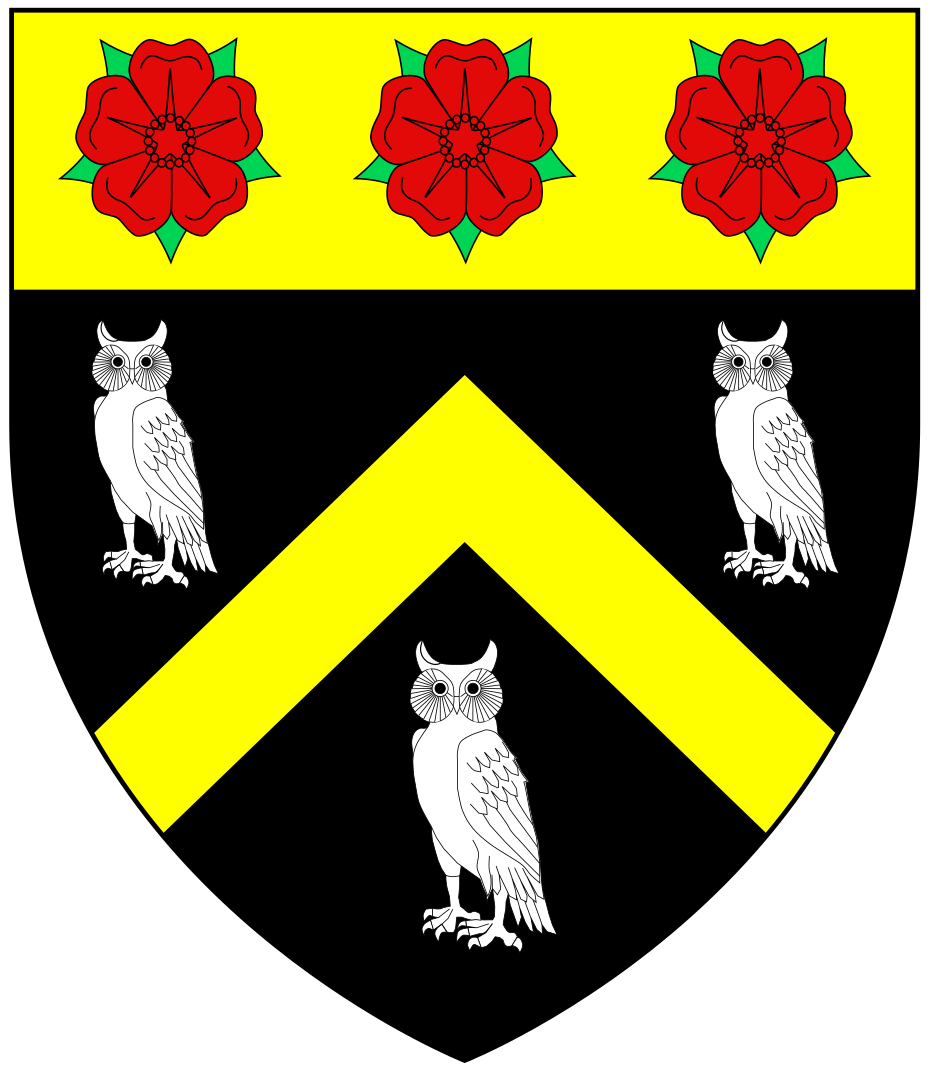
Canting arms of Oldham: Sable, between three owls argent, a chevron or, and on a chief of the third, three roses gules barbed vert

Hugh Oldham (c. 1452 – 25 June 1519) was an English cleric who was Bishop of Exeter (1505–19) and a notable patron of education as a founder and patron of The Manchester Grammar School and Corpus Christi College, Oxford.

Born in Lancashire to a family of minor gentry, he probably attended both Oxford and Cambridge universities, following which he was a clerk at Durham, then a rector in Cornwall before being employed by Lady Margaret Beaufort (mother of King Henry VII), rising to be the chancellor of her household by 1503. During this time he was preferred with many religious posts all over the country, being made archdeacon of Exeter in 1502 and finally bishop of that city in 1505, a decision that was probably influenced by Lady Margaret.

He was a conscientious bishop who ensured that only educated people were appointed to ecclesiastical posts. His patronage of educational establishments included the foundation of The Manchester Grammar School and Corpus Christi College, Oxford for which he donated £4,000. After his death he was buried in Exeter Cathedral in a chantry chapel that he had caused to be built for that purpose. The chapel is decorated with numerous carvings of owls, which were his personal device.

== Early life ==
Oldham was one of the younger of six sons born to Roger Oldham and his wife Margery who were, the limited evidence suggests, yeomen or minor gentry at Ancoats, which at the time was a village in North West England, but is now an inner city area of Manchester. There are few records of his early life, but it is known that he attended university, studying canon law and either arts or civil law probably at Oxford, and he was later (in 1493) a bachelor of law at Cambridge. There is no contemporary evidence, however, that he was a member of Queens' College, Cambridge as was claimed by Thomas Fuller in his Worthies of England of 1662 and often repeated.

In 1475 he was described in a deed transferring property to him from his eldest brother James as a "clerk of Durham". At this time he was most likely either in the household of, or employed by Lawrence Booth, Bishop of Durham, whose family came from the same area as Oldham's and by whom James had also been employed. He was rector of Lanivet in Cornwall between 1488 and 1493, when he resigned the living on a pension of £12. At this time he was also a servant to William Smyth, who was keeper of the hanaper in the Court of Chancery. In 1492 he was the receiver for Lady Margaret Beaufort's estates in the West Country, and by 1503 he had risen to be the chancellor of her household.

In the years following 1490, Oldham was made a canon of the cathedrals of Exeter, Lichfield, Lincoln, St Paul's, Salisbury and York. In 1496 William Smyth, who was by then Bishop of Coventry and Lichfield, appointed him to the non-residential post of master of the hospital of St John in Lichfield, to which Smyth had recently added a free grammar school and almshouse. The year 1499 saw him established as dean of Wimborne in Dorset, and in 1502 he was made archdeacon of Exeter. In 1503, he had sufficient prestige to be present at the placing of the foundation stone of the Henry VII Lady Chapel at Westminster Abbey.

== Bishop of Exeter ==
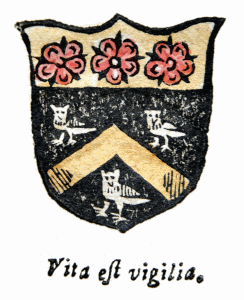
Bishop Oldham's coat of arms. Differences of his arms form the arms of Oldham Metropolitan Borough Council and of his foundations Manchester Grammar School and Corpus Christi College, Oxford

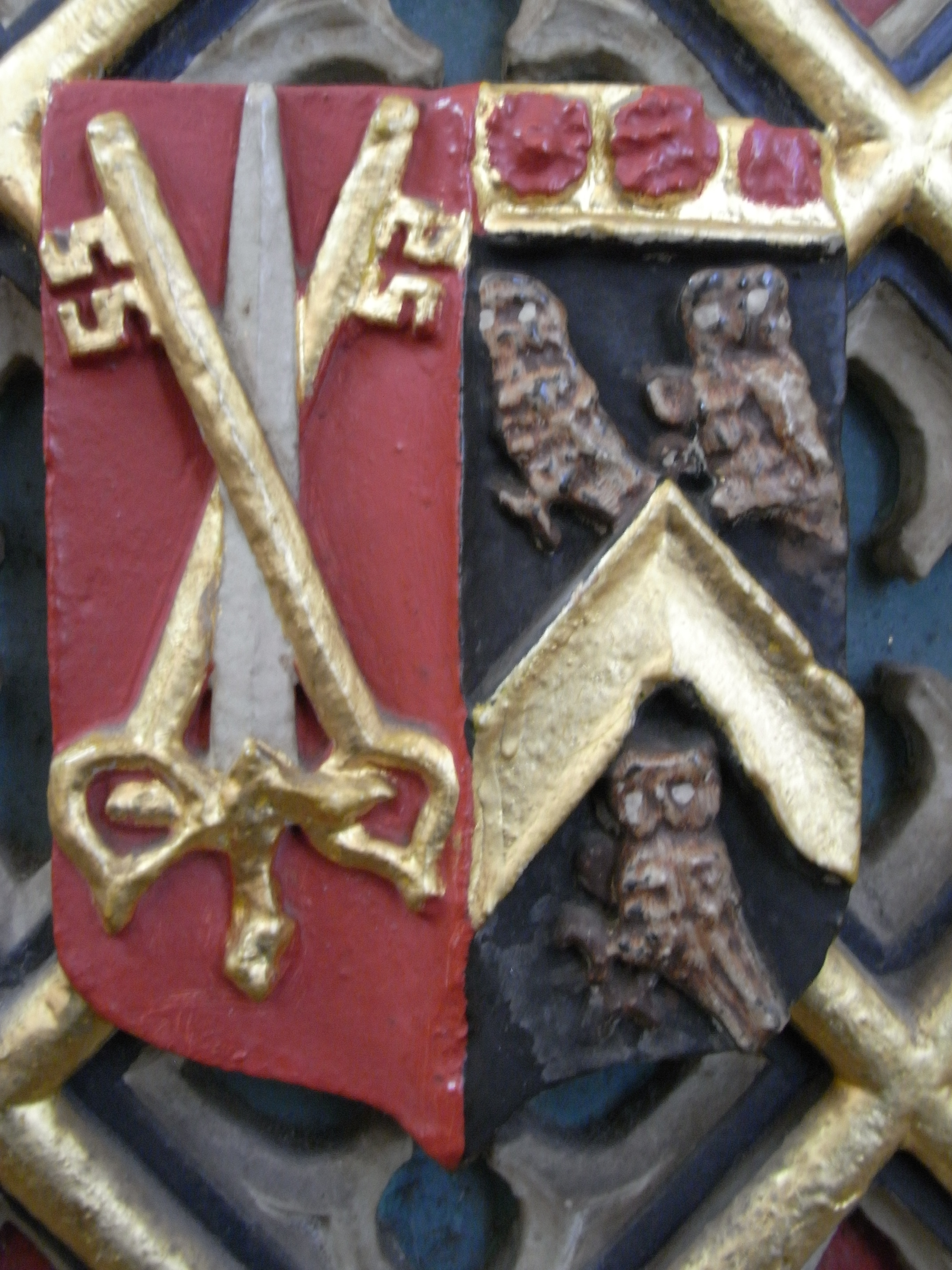
Heraldic escutcheon on tomb of Hugh Oldham (d.1519), Bishop of Exeter: Dexter: Gules, a sword erect in pale argent, hilted or surmounted by two keys addorsed in saltire of the last (See of Exeter) impaling: Sable, a chevron or between three owls argent on a chief of the second three roses gules (Oldham). The arms of Oldham can also be seen sculpted in stone on the tower of the Bishop's Palace, Exeter

Possibly with some influence from Lady Margaret Beaufort (who was the mother of the then reigning king, Henry VII), Oldham was appointed as Bishop of Exeter on 24 November 1504, and was consecrated in the post on 12 January 1505. He evidently took his duties as bishop seriously and ensured that only educated people, such as university graduates, were raised to most of the important roles under his control. He also instigated examinations to select the best candidates for ordination.

Bishop Oldham's coat of arms, shown here, are described as "Sable, a chevron or, between three Owls proper; on a chief of the second, three Roses gules, barbed vert." Oldham adopted the owl as his personal device. It was a play on words or rebus based on his surname, which would probably have been pronounced at the time as owl-dom.

From 1510 to 1513 he was one of a group of bishops who resisted, largely successfully, what they considered were undue claims made by William Warham, Archbishop of Canterbury, regarding the probate courts. In 1511 he regulated many cathedral matters by the issue of statutes, and he was not shy in confronting other religious houses when he thought it appropriate. He successfully annexed Warland Hospital in Totnes from the Trinitarian Order in 1509. This was done, as was the similar annexation of Clyst Gabriel at Sowton, to help finance the provision of regular meals for the twenty vicars choral at his Cathedral.

He was initially successful in his litigation against Richard Banham, the abbot of Tavistock Abbey, who in 1513 had declared his abbey exempt from the bishop's right of episcopal visitation. Oldham quickly excommunicated him, but after Banham's personal appeal that he be "absolved from his censures", Oldham reinstated him, on payment of five pounds. However, soon afterwards Banham appealed to Archbishop William Warham and Richard FitzJames, Bishop of London, who decided early in 1514 that since he had not produced any evidence of papal exemption, he had to submit to the bishop. Still not satisfied, Banham appealed directly to Rome and eventually received a papal bull, dated 14 September 1517, that exempted him totally from episcopal jurisdiction and took the Abbey under the sole protection of the Holy See, on payment of twenty shillings annually. These events are in direct contrast to what was written in 1601 by Francis Godwin in his Catalogue of the Bishops of England where he stated that it was Oldham who was excommunicated by the pope as a result of this dispute. Godwin's version of events was followed by several later historians, but Mumford (1936) flatly stated that "there is no record of any such excommunication".

Hugh Oldham had a brother, Bernard, who also followed a religious career. At Hugh's request, Lady Margaret Beaufort had seen that he was installed as rector in Crewkerne, Somerset, in around 1495. While there, Bernard helped John Combe, a lawyer and precentor of Exeter Cathedral, who came from Crewkerne, establish a free grammar school in the town. After Lady Margaret's death in 1509, Hugh spent a long time with his brother in Crewkerne, and arranged for him to be Archdeacon of Cornwall, a post which he held from 1509 to 1515. On 5 April 1515 Bernard was made treasurer of Exeter Cathedral, but he died within a month of taking up the post.

George Oliver in his Lives of the Bishops of Exeter (1861), relates an anecdote, originally told by John Hooker in the late 16th century, regarding the bishop's punctuality of dining at eleven o'clock in the morning, and of supping at five o'clock in the afternoon. Apparently to ensure precision he had a house-clock to strike the hours, and a servant to look after it. If the bishop was prevented by important business from coming to table at the appointed time, the servant would delay the clock's striking the hour until he knew that his master was ready. Sometimes, if asked what was the hour, the servant would humorously answer, "As your lordship pleaseth," at which the bishop would smile and go his way. Hooker also summed up his opinion of Bishop Oldham in these words: "A man having more zeal than knowledge and more devotion than learning; somewhat rough in speeches but friendly in doings [...] albeit he was not very much learned, yet a great favourer and a friend both to learning and to learned men".

== Interest in education ==
As bishop, Oldham showed a keen interest in education, probably influenced by his brother Bernard's experiences in Crewkerne. He donated £4,000 and land in Chelsea towards Corpus Christi College, Oxford, which his friend and former Bishop of Exeter, Richard Foxe was in the process of establishing. In 1513, Foxe's original intention had been for the college to be for monks, similar to the long-established Durham College and Canterbury College, both at Oxford. However, Oldham appears to have persuaded Foxe to found a secular college instead, along the lines of New College or Magdalen, supposedly telling him that "monks were but a sort of bussing [buzzing] flies ... whose state could not long endure"—showing, according to some, that Oldham was well aware of the coming Reformation. In return for his generosity, daily prayers for him were recited in the new chapel at Corpus Christi both during his lifetime and after his death, and the college still has a contemporary portrait of him.

Oldham may also have patronized Brasenose College, Oxford, which his former master William Smyth had founded in 1509. The historian John Hooker stated that Oldham's advances to Smyth were rebuffed, but evidence of the patronage existed in the form of his coat of arms that used to be set in a library window there. He apparently also offered help to Exeter College, Oxford, established in 1314 by one of his predecessors at Exeter, Bishop Stapledon, but in this case there is no evidence to contradict Hooker's statement that his offer was rejected.

Oldham's interests also extended to lower levels of education. He ensured that the younger members of Exeter's cathedral choir attended the city high school, for instance, but his main endowment in this field was made back in his home county of Lancashire. On 2 July 1515 he signed an endowment trust deed establishing the Manchester Free Grammar School for Lancashire Boys which later became The Manchester Grammar School. This deed promoted "godliness and good learning" and promised that any boy showing sufficient academic ability, regardless of background, could attend, free of charge. A site was purchased in September 1516 and construction took place between April 1517 and August 1518. The total cost, as shown by a bill signed by Oldham, was £218.13s.5d, most of which must have been given by Oldham himself.

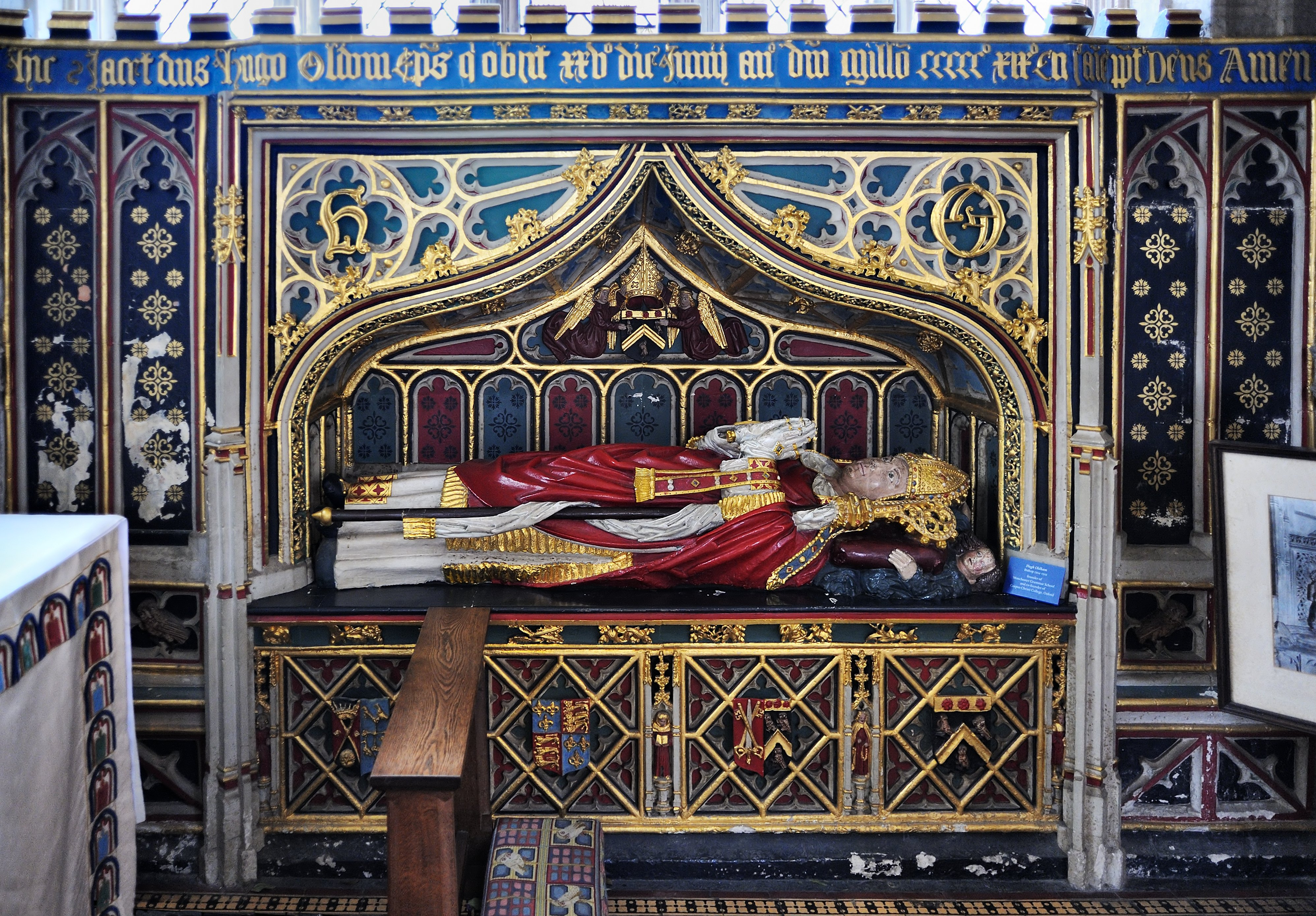
Oldham's tomb in Exeter Cathedral

== Oldham's death, his chapel and tomb ==
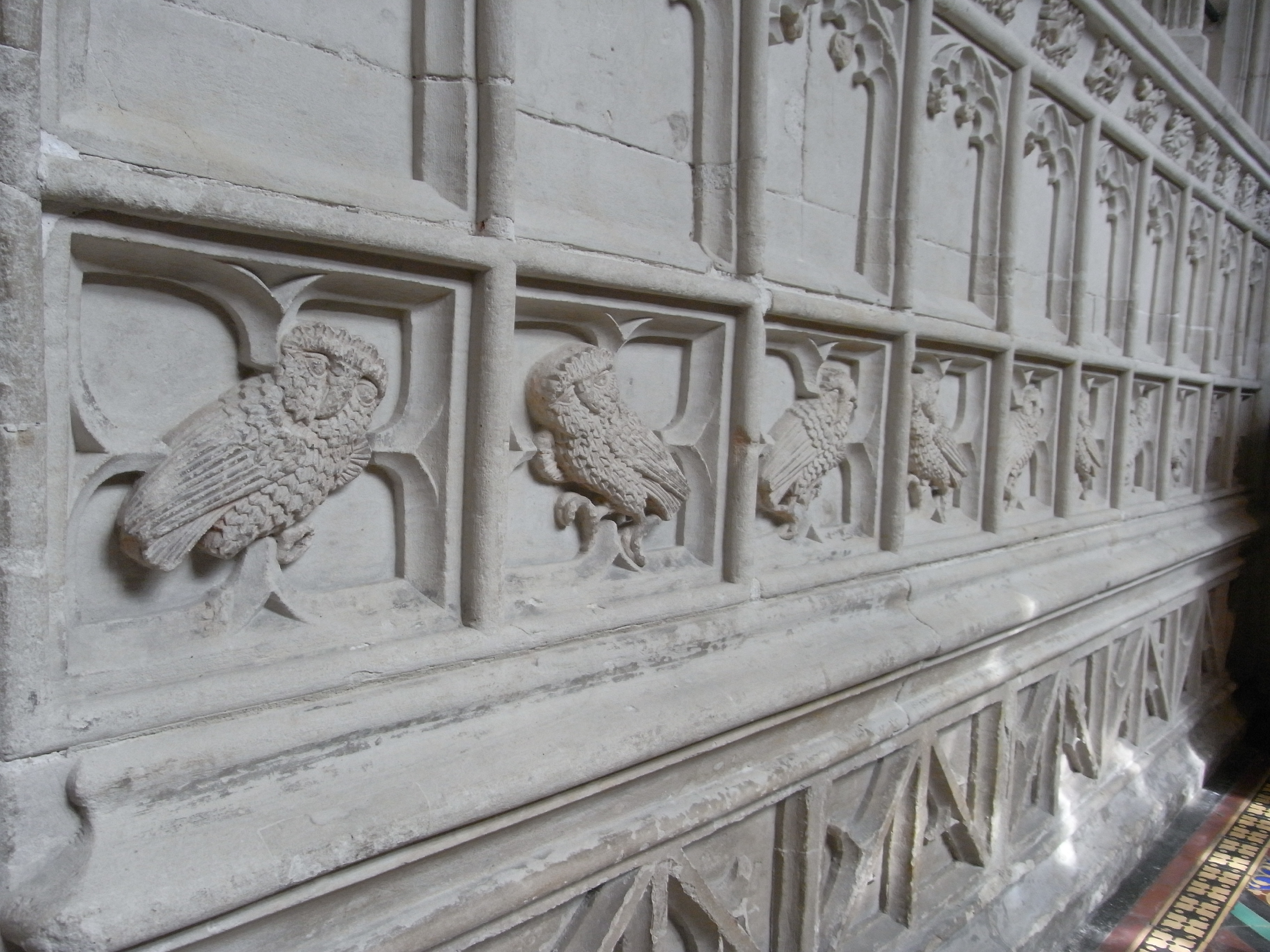
Some of about 59 sculpted owl rebuses on the walls, ceiling and tomb in the chantry chapel of Bishop Oldham

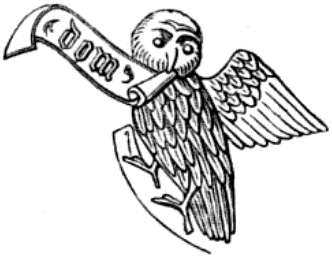
The owl-dom rebus. A depiction of the stone carving in Oldham's chantry

Sir John Speke, a wealthy Devon knight, and Bishop Oldham jointly planned the construction of two new chantry chapels in complementary positions off the north and south choir-aisles of Exeter Cathedral. Oldham's chapel, off the south aisle, was apparently complete by 1513. It was dedicated to St Saviour, and Oldham intended his body to rest there. Speke died on 28 April 1518 and was interred in his tomb off the north aisle. On 16 December of the same year, Oldham drew up his will in which he gave £80 for the vicars choral to celebrate a daily mass for his soul at his tomb. He died just six months later, on 25 June 1519.

His body lies in his chantry chapel which is decorated with numerous carvings of the owl that was his personal device. One of the owls carries a scroll in its beak, bearing the letters "DOM". His tomb is surmounted by a brightly painted, but rather crudely carved effigy, typical of the general decline in the quality of sepulchral monuments of the early 16th century. The tomb was restored by Corpus Christi College in the late 19th century. It was restored again and recoloured, together with many other monuments in the cathedral, between 1956 and 1967.

== Legacy ==
Bishop Oldham is well remembered by The Manchester Grammar School: on a Sunday at the end of June each year representatives from the school hold a commemorative service in Exeter Cathedral during which a wreath is laid on his tomb. Since 2005 the school has held an annual Hugh Oldham Lecture, with speakers that have included Astronomer Royal Martin Rees, historian Michael Wood and Lord Winston. And in 2001 the Bishop of Exeter, Michael Langrish gave a speech to the London Section of the Old Mancunians' Association in which he emphasised two facets of Bishop Oldham's life, both of which he said have relevance today: the importance of learning and education that is broad-based, humane and directed to the well-being of society, and to be open to the future and critically appreciative of what it might be. A life-size bronze statue of the bishop, sculpted by William Macmillan in 1931, stands in the school grounds, and the school's badge still incorporates Oldham's owls.

Hugh Oldham Lads Club, one of the first Lads Clubs in Manchester and similar in its purpose to the later Salford Lads Club, was founded by the educator Alexander Devine in 1887 as a result of his concern for the welfare of children. It continued until 1958.

== Sources ==
- Erskine, Audrey; Hope, Vyvyan; Lloyd, John (1988). Exeter Cathedral – A Short History and Description. The Dean & Chapter of Exeter Cathedral. ISBN 0-9503320-4-6.
- Lepine, David; Orme, Nicholas (2003). Death and Memory in Medieval Exeter. New series. Vol. 46. Devon and Cornwall Record Society. ISBN 0-901853-46-1.
- Oliver, George (1861). Lives of the Bishops of Exeter and a History of the Cathedral. Exeter: William Roberts. Archived from the original on 26 July 2011.
- Orme, Nicholas (1986), "Sir John Speke and his Chapel in Exeter Cathedral", Report and Transactions of the Devonshire Association, 118
- Pickerill, J. B. (2001), The Portcullis and the Owl – An account of the times of Hugh Oldham and his Patroness (PDF), The Manchester Grammar School Old Boys Network, archived from the original (PDF) on 27 July 2011

Catholic Church titles
Preceded by John Arundel	Bishop of Exeter; 1504–1519	Succeeded by John Vesey
