= William Sheffield =

William Sheffield may refer to:

- William Sheffield (academic) (c.1732–1795), English museum keeper and college provost
- William Sheffield (judge), American attorney and judge
- William Paine Sheffield Sr., U.S. Representative and Senator from Rhode Island
- William Paine Sheffield Jr., U.S. Representative from Rhode Island
- William Sheffield (fl. 1407–1421) for Rutland (UK Parliament constituency)
- William Sheffield (died 1646), MP for Hedon, 1614 and Thirsk (UK Parliament constituency), 1624
- Will Sheffield (born 2000), English cricketer
- Bill Sheffield (1928–2022), American politician and former governor of Alaska
