= Stephen Townesend =

Stephen Townesend may refer to:

- Stephen Townesend (priest), Dean of Exeter, 1583–1588
- Stephen Townesend (surgeon), English surgeon, stage actor, anti-vivisectionist and writer

== See also ==
- Stephen J. Townsend, United States Army general
