= Edward Willoughby =

Edward Willoughby (died 23 November 1508) was Dean of Exeter between 1496 and 1508.

== Career ==
He was appointed:

- Prebendary of Liddington under Shaftesbury
- Prebendary of North Grantham at Salisbury 1488
- Dean of Exeter 1496 - 1508
- Archdeacon of Stafford

He was appointed to the twelfth stall in St George's Chapel, Windsor Castle in 1495, and held the stall until 1508.

== Notes ==
Catholic Church titles
Preceded by John Arundel	Dean of Exeter; 1496–1509	Succeeded by Thomas Hobbes
