= Richard Bancroft =

Archbishop of Canterbury from 1604 to 1610

The Most Reverend and Right Honourable Richard Bancroft
- Archbishop of Canterbury
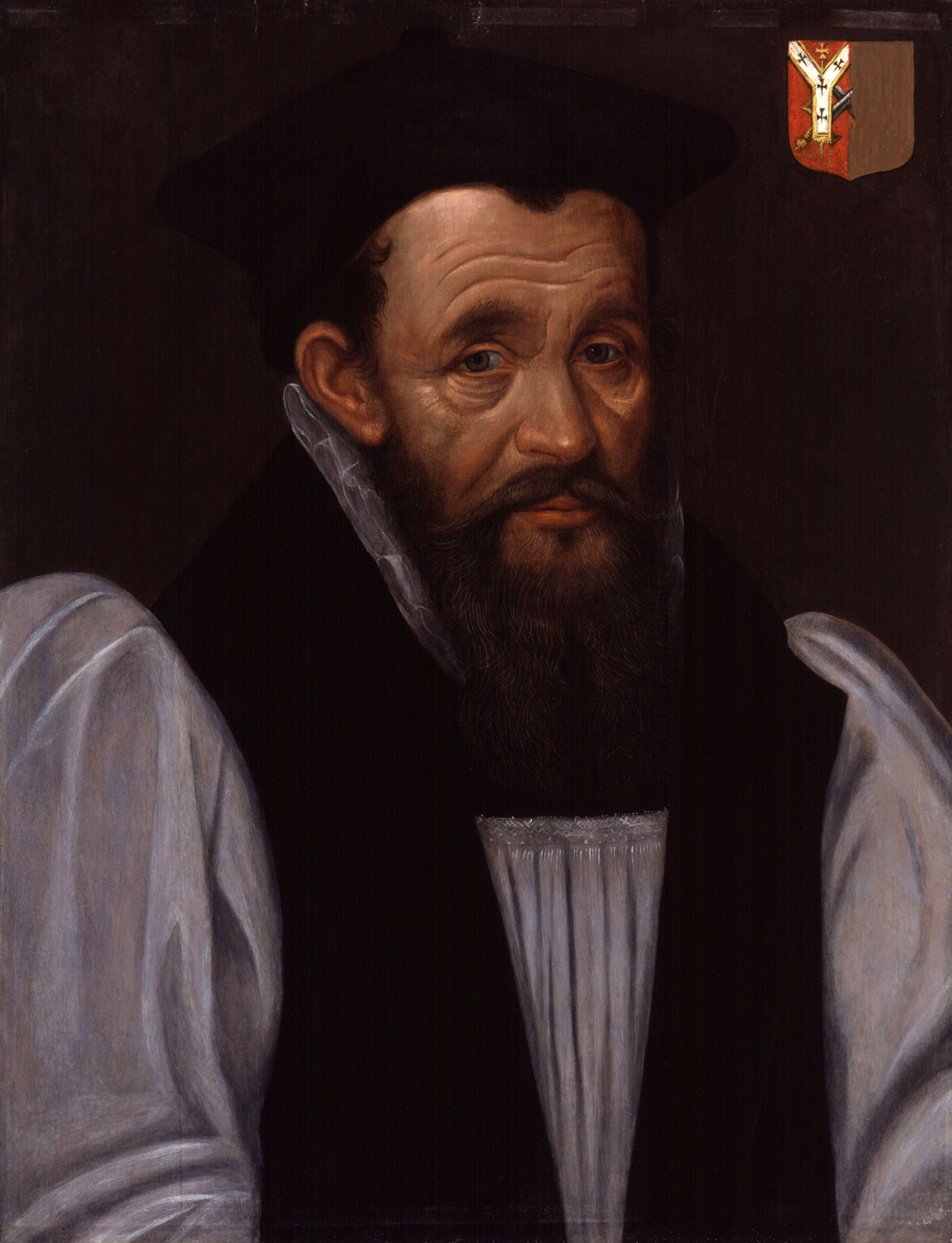
- Church: Church of England
- Diocese: Canterbury
- Installed: November 1604
- Term ended: 2 November 1610
- Predecessor: John Whitgift
- Successor: George Abbot

Orders
- Ordination: 1574 by Richard Cox
- Consecration: 8 May 1597 by John Whitgift

Personal details
- Born: September 1544 Farnworth, Lancashire, England
- Died: 2 November 1610 (aged 66) Lambeth, Surrey, England
- Buried: Lambeth
- Denomination: Anglican
- Parents: John Bancroft; Mary Curwen
- Education: Christ's College, Cambridge, Jesus College, Cambridge

Richard Bancroft (September 1544 – 2 November 1610) was an English churchman, Archbishop of Canterbury from 1604 to 1610 and "chief overseer" of the King James Bible.

== Life ==
Bancroft was born in September 1544 at Farnworth, now part of Widnes, Cheshire (not to be confused with Farnworth in Bolton, Lancashire), second son of Mary [Curwen] and John Bancroft. His mother was the daughter of James Curwen and niece to Hugh Curwen, Archbishop of Dublin from 1555 to 1567, then Bishop of Oxford until his death in November 1568.

He was initially educated at the local grammar school, founded by bishop William Smyth, also from Farnworth. He became a scholar of Christ's College, Cambridge in 1563, and graduated BA in 1567, MA in 1570 (at Jesus College, Cambridge), DD 1585.

Bancroft was older than most students at Cambridge, reportedly due to money problems, and was apparently more successful at sports (wrestling, boxing and quarterstaff) than study. During his many years there, Bancroft was one of the students chosen to meet Queen Elizabeth I when she visited the university. In 1564, his uncle Hugh obtained a sinecure for him at St Patrick's, Dublin. Ordained about that time, he was named chaplain to Richard Cox, then bishop of Ely, and in 1575 was presented to the rectory of Teversham in Cambridgeshire. The next year he was one of the preachers to the university.

In 1584 he was made rector of St Andrew, Holborn. In 1585 he was appointed treasurer of St Paul's Cathedral, London, and in 1586 was made a member of the ecclesiastical commission. On 9 February 1589 he preached at Paul's Cross a sermon, the substance of which was a passionate attack on the Puritans. He described their speeches and proceedings, caricatured their motives, denounced the exercise of the right of private judgment, and set forth the divine right of bishops in such strong language that Sir Francis Knollys, the Puritanically inclined Treasurer to the Household, held it to amount to a threat against the supremacy of the crown.

In the following year Bancroft was made a prebendary of St Paul's; he had been canon of Westminster since 1587. He was chaplain successively to Lord Chancellor Hatton and Archbishop Whitgift. In June 1597, he was consecrated Bishop of London; and from this time, in consequence of the age and incapacity for business of Archbishop Whitgift, he was virtually invested with the power of primate, and had the sole management of ecclesiastical affairs. Among the more noteworthy cases which fell under his direction were the proceedings against "Martin Marprelate", Thomas Cartwright and his friends, and John Penry, whose "seditious writings" he caused to be intercepted and given up to the Lord Keeper.

In 1600 he was sent on an embassy, with others, to Emden, for the purpose of settling certain matters in dispute between the English and the Danes. This mission, however, failed. Bancroft was present at the death of Queen Elizabeth I.

Bancroft died having never married, 2 November 1610. He was interred in the parish Church at Lambeth with a simple stone slab marking the grave. A keen reader, he left behind a library of over 6,000 volumes.

=== Archbishop of Canterbury ===
In March 1604 Bancroft, on Whitgift's death, was appointed by royal writ president of convocation then assembled; and he there presented a book of canons collected by himself. It was adopted and received the royal approval, but was strongly opposed and set aside by Parliament two months afterwards. In the following November he was elected successor to Whitgift in the see of Canterbury. He continued to show the same zeal and severity as before, and with so much success that Lord Clarendon, writing in his praise, expressed the opinion that "if Bancroft had lived, he would quickly have extinguished all that fire in England which had been kindled at Geneva."

In 1608 he was chosen chancellor of the University of Oxford. One of his last public acts was a proposal laid before Parliament for improving the revenues of the Church, and a project for a college of controversial divinity at Chelsea. In the last few months of his life he took part in the discussion about the consecration of certain Scottish bishops, and it was in pursuance of his advice that they were consecrated by several bishops of the English Church. By this act were laid the foundations of the Scottish Episcopal Church. Bancroft was "the chief overseer" of the authorized version of the Bible. He died at Lambeth Palace on 2 November 1610.

== Discovery of his coffin ==
In 2016, during the refurbishment of the Garden Museum, which is housed at the medieval church of St Mary-at-Lambeth, 30 lead coffins were found; one with an archbishop's red and gold mitre on top of it. On one of these coffins, a metal plate served to identify it as being that of Bancroft.

== Arms ==
Coat of arms of Richard Bancroft
Notes When Bancroft was serving as a bishop his arms would be displayed impaled with the arms of the diocese and topped with a mitre. Escutcheon Or on a bend between six crosslets Azure three garbs of the field.

== See also ==
- John Bancroft, his nephew and Master of University College, Oxford
- Hugh Curwen, Archbishop of Dublin 1555 to 1567, Bishop of Oxford 1567 to 1568

Church of England titles
Preceded by Richard Fletcher	Bishop of London; 1597–1604	Succeeded by Richard Vaughan
Preceded by John Whitgift	Archbishop of Canterbury; 1604–1610	Succeeded by George Abbot
Academic offices
Preceded by Earl of Dorset	Chancellor of the University of Oxford; 1608–1610	Succeeded by Baron Ellesmere
