= Henry Somerset =

Henry Somerset may refer to:

- Henry Somerset, 2nd Earl of Worcester (c. 1496–1549), English nobleman
- Henry Somerset, 1st Marquess of Worcester (bef. 1590–1646), English peer, son of Edward Somerset, 4th Earl of Worcester
- Henry Somerset, 1st Duke of Beaufort (1629–1699/1700), 3rd Marquess of Worcester, English peer
- Henry Somerset, 2nd Duke of Beaufort (1684–1714), only son of Charles Somerset, Marquess of Worcester
- Henry Somerset, 3rd Duke of Beaufort (1707–1745), also known as Henry Scudamore, the elder son of the 2nd Duke of Beaufort
- Henry Somerset, 5th Duke of Beaufort (1744–1803), son of the 4th Duke of Beaufort
- Henry Somerset, 6th Duke of Beaufort (1766–1835), British peer and son of the 5th Duke of Beaufort
- Henry Somerset, 7th Duke of Beaufort (1792–1853), British peer, soldier and son of the 6th Duke of Beaufort
- Henry Somerset (British Army officer) (1794–1862)
- Henry Somerset, 8th Duke of Beaufort (1824–1899), British peer, soldier and politician, son of the 7th Duke of Beaufort
- Henry Somerset, 9th Duke of Beaufort (1847–1924), British peer and son of the 8th Duke of Beaufort
- Lord Henry Somerset (1849–1932), British politician and third son of the 8th Duke of Beaufort
- Lady Henry Somerset (1851–1921), British philanthropist, temperance leader and campaigner for women's rights
- Henry Somerset, 10th Duke of Beaufort (1900–1984), British peer, son of the 9th Duke of Beaufort
- Henry Somerset, 12th Duke of Beaufort (born 1952), British peer, son of the 11th Duke of Beaufort
- Henry Plantagenet Somerset (1852–1936), pioneer pastoralist and politician in Queensland, Australia
- Henry de Somerset, Dean of Exeter between 1302 and 1307
- Lord Henry Arthur George Somerset (1851–1926)
