= John Hales (bishop of Coventry and Lichfield) =

15th-century Bishop of Coventry and Lichfield

The Right Reverend John Hales
- Bishop of Coventry and Lichfield
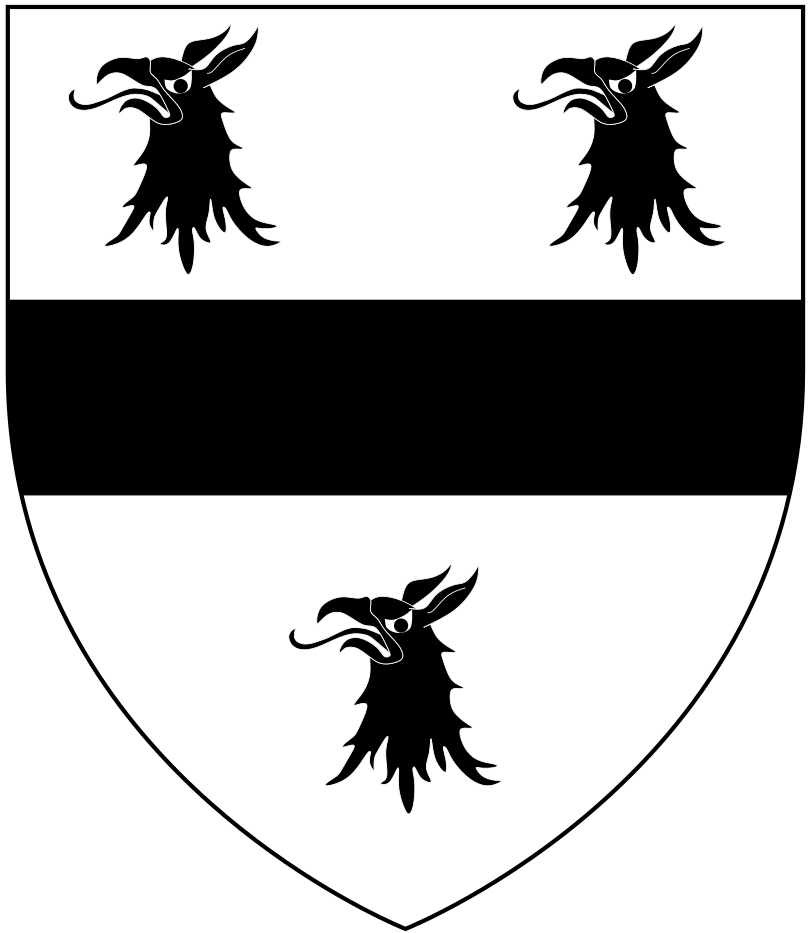
- Arms of Hals of Kenedon in the parish of Sherford, Devon: Argent, a fess between three griffin's heads erased sable
- Appointed: 20 September 1459
- Term ended: between 15 September and 30 September 1490
- Predecessor: Reginald Boulers
- Successor: William Smyth

Orders
- Consecration: 25 November 1459

Personal details
- Died: September 1490
- Denomination: Catholic

John Hales (c. 1400–1490) (alias Hals, Halse, etc.) was Bishop of Coventry and Lichfield (1459–1490). He was one of the Worthies of Devon of the biographer John Prince (d.1723).

== Origins ==
Hales was the second son of John Hals (fl.1423) of Kenedon in the parish of Sherford, Devon (a Justice of the Common Pleas and in 1423 a Justice of the King's Bench) by his first wife, a daughter of the Mewye (alias Mewy) family of Whitchurch near Tavistock, Devon. His great-uncle was Richard Hals (d.1418), a Canon of Exeter Cathedral in Devon, and Treasurer of Exeter Cathedral in 1400, who in 1414 was sent as Ambassador to Brittany. Bishop Hals appointed his kinsman Edmund Hals as Archdeacon of Salop from an unknown date until 1485 and as Archdeacon of Derby from 1485, probably until his death. The mansion house of the Hals' at Kenedon, originally quadrangular in form, is today represented by a small 16th c. farmhouse known as Keynedon, about 1 mile south of the village of Sherford. The early 15th century gate-tower of the house was demolished in about 1850.

== Career ==
Hales was Provost of Oriel College, Oxford, from 1446 to 1449. He was Dean of Exeter between 1457 and 1459. In 1470, during the reign of King Henry VI, Hales was appointed Keeper of the Privy Seal, but lost the office on the restoration of King Edward IV in 1471. Hales was nominated as Bishop of Coventry and Lichfield on 20 September 1459, and was consecrated on 25 November 1459. He died between 15 and 30 September 1490, aged about 90, and was buried in Lichfield Cathedral.

== Sources ==
- Fryde, E. B.; Greenway, D. E.; Porter, S.; Roy, I. (1996). Handbook of British Chronology (Third revised ed.). Cambridge: Cambridge University Press. ISBN 0-521-56350-X.

Academic offices
Preceded by Walter Lyhert	Provost of Oriel College, Oxford; 1446–1449	Succeeded by Henry Sampson
Political offices
Preceded by Thomas Rotheram	Lord Privy Seal; 1470–1471	Succeeded by Thomas Rotheram
Catholic Church titles
Preceded by John Cobethorn	Dean of Exeter; 1457–1459	Succeeded by Henry Webber
Preceded by Reginald Boulers	Bishop of Coventry and Lichfield; 1459–1490	Succeeded by William Smyth
