= Gregory Dodds =

Dean of Exeter

Gregory Dodds was Dean of Exeter between 1560 and 1570. He had been prior of Cambridge Blackfriars at its dissolution.

== Notes ==
Religious titles
Preceded by Thomas Reynolds	Dean of Exeter; 1560–1570	Succeeded by George Carew
