= William Sheffield (judge) =

American judge

William Sheffield was an American attorney and judge in the state of California. He was a general legal counsel for the Church of Jesus Christ of Latter-day Saints (LDS Church) in the Asia Area of the church. He was closely connected with sending Mormon missionaries to India in the late-20th century. Sheffield also served as a judge in the Superior Courts of California, Orange County.

== Early life ==
Sheffield earned his undergraduate degree from California State University, Long Beach. He completed a law degree at the University of California, Berkeley.

== Career ==
He served as a member of Indira Gandhi's defense team in the late 1970s. From 1983 to 1985 Sheffield was a judge on the Superior Court of California, sitting in Orange County. In 1985, Sheffield resigned his judgeship and enrolled in Yale Divinity School. Sheffield began attending services of the Methodist Church. His wife was a Latter-day Saint.

Sheffield's investigations of Mormonism while at Yale led him to enroll at Brigham Young University (BYU), which had created a graduate program in theology. He did much of his work at BYU under Joseph Fielding McConkie and eventually joined the LDS Church, whereupon he returned to Yale and completed his divinity degree. After completing his divinity degree from Yale, he worked as the LDS Church's legal counsel in Asia where he used his connections with Rajiv Gandhi to get LDS Church missionaries allowed into that country.

=== Feelings/Le feu aux poudres ===
In 1988 William Sheffield defended Morris Albert Kaiserman in a plagiarism lawsuit over his hit song "Feelings". Gaste received approximately 1/2 million dollars US for the plagiarism lawsuit over Gaste's obscure song in the 1957 French movie soundtrack of "Le feu aux poudres". This soundtrack earned less than $15,000 in worldwide royalties. This is a partial and simplified soundtrack of “Pour Toi”. Morris Kaiserman was accused of using “Pour Toi” verbatim to produce "Feelings". William Sheffield didn't prevail in his defense. Incidental to the lawsuit, Sheffield purchased the remaining rights to "Feelings". Gaste's lawyers failed to protect future ASCAP royalties which were substantial, unlike "Pour Toi".

In other lawsuits, Sheffield defended a hippopotamus that escaped from an animal safari attraction in Irvine California. He sued the Pope over the death of a St. Bernard canine purchased from a catholic monastery in Switzerland. In addition to animal rights, Sheffield was a successful criminal defense attorney in Orange county CA, until his elevation to Superior Court judge in 1983.

Sheffield had a major role in the development of Dr. ADSN Prasad's humanitarian Pathway Center for Mentally and Physically Disabled Children in Chennai, India. He met Dr. Prasad in 1988 and spent decades helping Pathway develop funding and vision to grow to serve tens of thousands of people. This included establishing the US-based 501(c)(3) organization Pathway Centre for Mentally and Physically Handicapped Children.

Upon completion of his assignment for the Church in 1990, Sheffield returned to Southern California where he became an active mediator/arbitrator, having conducted over 5000 mediations and arbitrations. Sheffield was named among the top twenty neutrals in California by the Daily Journal. He was named among the top lawyers in America.

Following his retirement, Sheffield was hired by the Los Angeles Unified School District to investigate complaints of retaliatory suspensions of students for actions by their parents in a San Fernando Valley Middle School.

Sheffield wrote the article "Voices from the Dust" in the Encyclopedia of Mormonism.
