= Alexander Wallace (priest) =

English priest, colonial administrator and author

Alexander Ross Wallace (27 September 1891 – 26 August 1982) was an English priest, colonial administrator, and author. He was the Dean of Exeter in the Church of England from 1950 to 1960.

Wallace was educated at Clifton and Corpus Christi College, Cambridge. He entered the Indian Civil Service in 1914 and when World War I came joined the 17th Cavalry. In 1922 he became a schoolmaster at Wellington College, Berkshire. From 1925 to 1930, he was Headmaster at Cargilfield School, Edinburgh . Further headships followed at Blundell's (1930–1933) and Sherborne (1934–1950) before his ordination in 1939. He was a Canon Residentiary at Salisbury Cathedral from 1942 to 1950 when he became Dean of Exeter Cathedral. He retired to Lyme Regis, Dorset.

Church of England titles
Preceded by Spencer Cecil Carpenter	Dean of Exeter; 1950– 1960	Succeeded by Marcus Knight
