= Cambridge Blackfriars =

Priory in Cambridgeshire, England

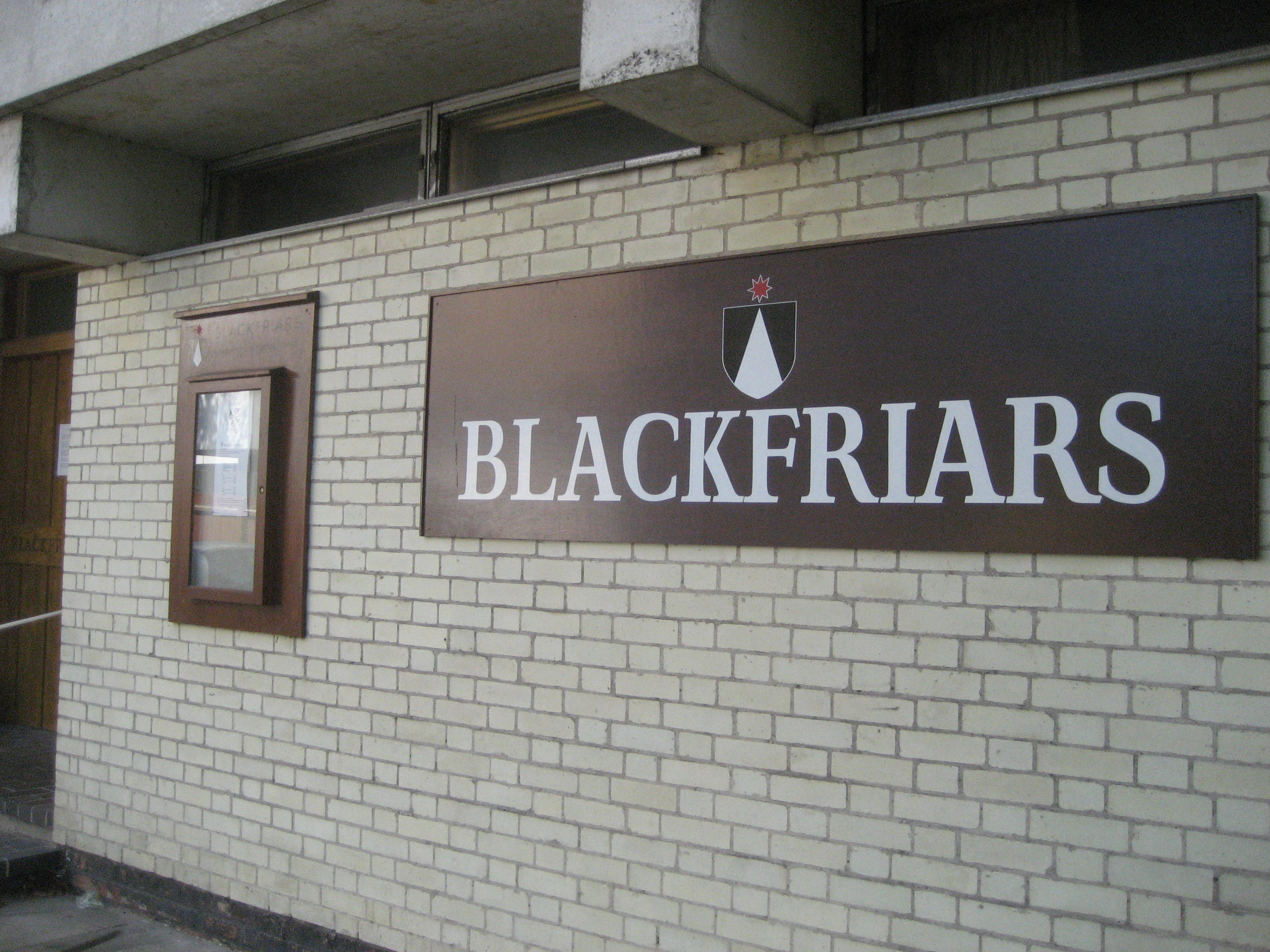
- The front of the priory

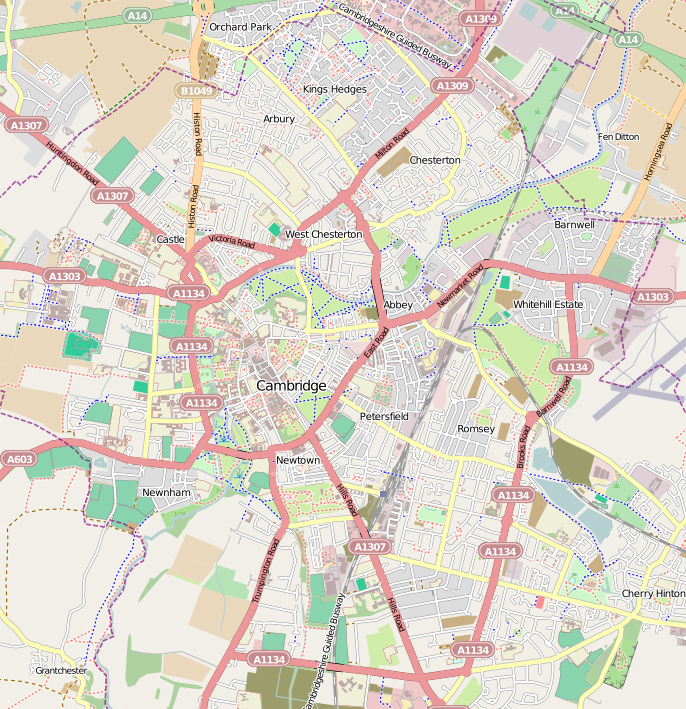
- Location within Cambridge
- Interactive map of Cambridge Blackfriars

Monastery information
- Full name: Priory of St Michael the Archangel
- Order: Dominican Order
- Established: 1238
- Disestablished: 1538
- Reestablished: 1938
- Dedication: Michael the Archangel
- Diocese: East Anglia

People
- Founder: Sebastian Bullough (1938)
- Prior: Robert Verrill
- Important associated figures: Aidan Nichols, Richard Finn, Yves Congar

Site
- Location: Buckingham Road, Cambridge, CB3 0DD England
- Coordinates: 52.21376°N 0.10924°E
- Public access: Limited, but accessible after Daily Mass
- Website: Blackfriars Cambridge

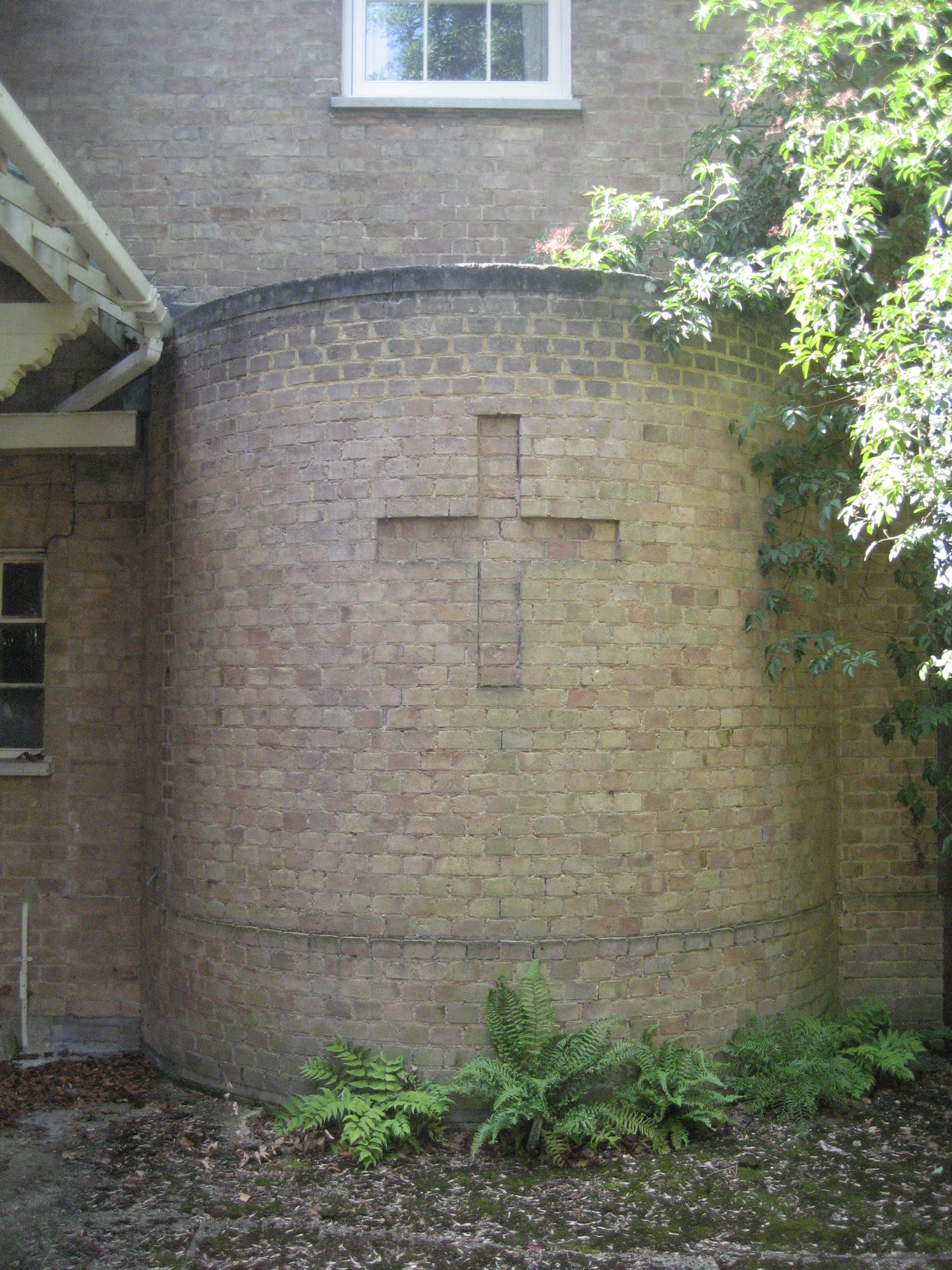
Cross

Cambridge Blackfriars is a priory of the Dominican Order in Cambridgeshire, England. It was established in 1238, dissolved in 1538 and re-established in 1938. It continues to operate as a Dominican priory and, in 2000, became the novitiate house of the English Province of the Order of Preachers.

The new site is at Buckingham Road, Cambridge, close to Murray Edwards College. Two existing houses were linked by a new wing in 1961–1962 designed by David Roberts. The original house was offered to the Order in 1938 by the widow of Professor Edward Bullough. The second house, Howfield, the family home of Arthur Stanley Ramsey, was bought in 1955.

The medieval Dominican Friary was founded before 1238. At the time of its dissolution in 1538, there was a prior and fifteen others. The last prior Gregory Dodds was later Dean of Exeter. A friar John Scory in 1551 became a bishop in the Church of England. Emmanuel College was founded on the site in 1584 and the college's Front Court incorporates 14th-century work from the Friary, in the North Range and Hall.

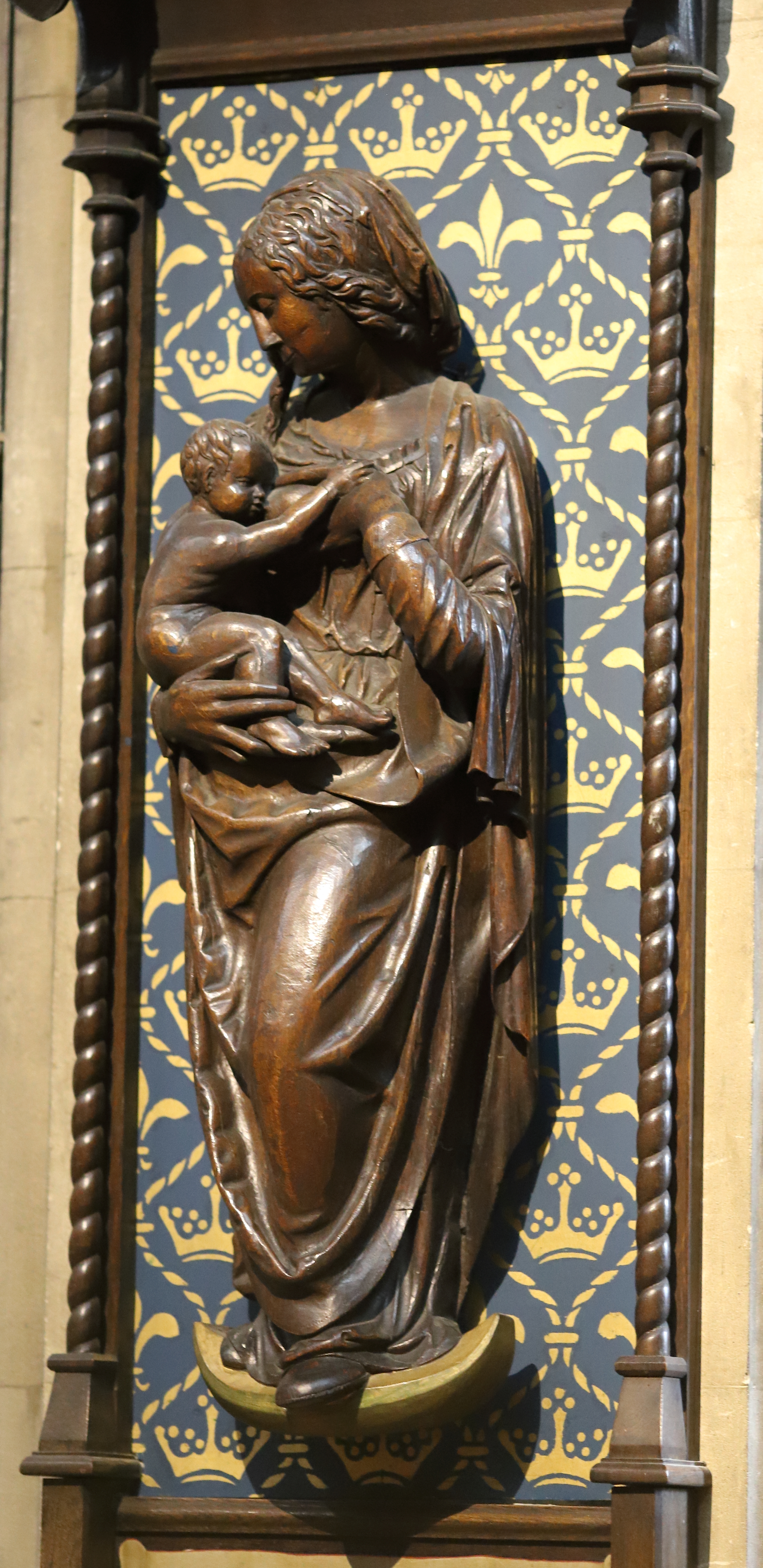
Statue of the virgin and child in the Church of Our Lady and the English Martyrs, reputed to have been removed from the Dominican Friary

The statue of the virgin and child now in the Church of Our Lady and the English Martyrs in Cambridge is reputed to have been in the Dominican Friary before the dissolution. In 1538 John Hilsey sent Gregory Dodds to Thomas Cromwell, Henry VIII's chief minister, to request that the image of Our Lady of Grace be removed from the friary. The statue now in the church is said to have been discovered in Emmanuel College in 1850.
