= Matthew Warren =

- Born: 1642; England
- Died: 1706 (aged 63–64); England
- Education: St John's College, Oxford
- Occupations: Minister, pastor
- Parent: John Warren

Matthew Warren (1642–1706) was an English nonconformist minister and tutor.

== Life ==
He was a younger son of John Warren of Otterford, Somerset. He was educated at Crewkerne grammar school, and St John's College, Oxford, where he matriculated on 3 July 1658. At the Restoration of 1660 he left Oxford with his tutor. After a year at Reading he returned to Otterford, and began to preach. He held no living, but was silenced by the Uniformity Act 1662.

After this he employed himself as a tutor—Warren was one of the first nonconformists who trained students for the ministry. The date at which he began this work was not later than 1671, when John Shower entered with him. Among his early pupils was Christopher Taylor (died 26 October 1723), in whose ordination at Lyme Regis, Dorset, he took part on 25 August 1687. By this time he had moved to Taunton, where, with Emanuel Hartford (died 4 August 1706, aged 65), he founded a dissenting congregation under the declaration for liberty of conscience (1687).

At Taunton he continued his academy; his most distinguished pupil was Henry Grove. Warren encouraged his students to read modern books and promoted biblical criticism. He was successful in his congregation at Paul's meeting; originally presbyterian, but it became congregationalist. He died at Taunton on 14 June 1706. His funeral sermon was preached by John Sprint of Milbournport. He was married and left children. Christopher Taylor wrote a Latin epitaph for him.
