= Roger de Wynkleigh =

13th-century English Dean of Exeter

Roger de Wynkleigh was Dean of Exeter between 1231 and 1252.

== Notes ==
Preceded by Serlo (priest)	Dean of Exeter; 1231–1252	Succeeded by William de Stanwey
