= Crewkerne Grammar School =

Crewkerne Grammar School Latin: Schola Crokorniensis
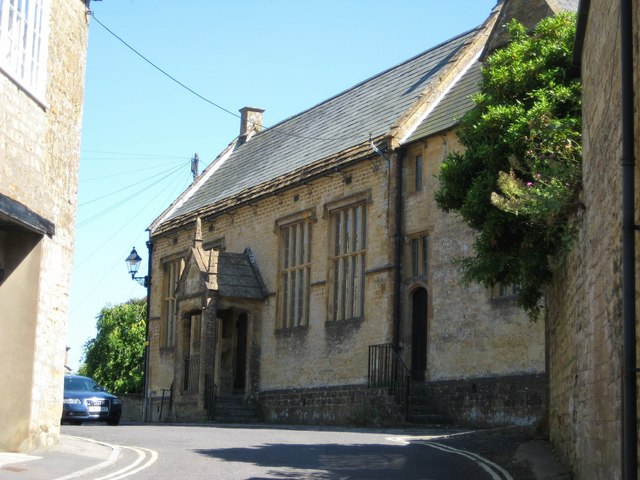
- The old school building, now a church hall

Location
- Abbey Street, Crewkerne; Crewkerne, Somerset; England
- Coordinates: 50°53′07.5″N 2°47′53″W

Information
- Type: Private grammar school
- Motto: Venite filii obedite mihi, timorem Domini ego vos docebo (Come, boys, obey me, I shall teach you the fear of the Lord)
- Religious affiliation: Church of England
- Established: 1499; 527 years ago
- Founder: John de Combe
- Closed: 1904
- Gender: Boys
- Age range: 7–17

Crewkerne Grammar School was a grammar school in the town of Crewkerne in the English county of Somerset.

== History ==
The school was founded in 1499 by John de Combe, a precentor of Exeter Cathedral and former vicar of Crewkerne, who had been born in the town. He and other later benefactors endowed the school with land and houses. In 1577, the trustees of the school were "six of the most discreetest men in town". In the 17th century, the trustees gave other support to the poor of the town, lending money during the plague, buying fire buckets, and helping to fund the conversion of the bridewell into a workhouse.

The grammar school building in Abbey Street, immediately north of St Bartholomew's church, dates from 1636 and was used by the school until 1882.

It was reported in 1855 that by a recent order of the Court of Chancery the school was free to all sons of inhabitants living within six miles of Crewkerne "for instruction in Latin, Greek, and the principles of the Established Church". There were then four exhibitions for former pupils going on to the University of Oxford and three others, founded by Lord Wynford, each worth £25 a year for four years, of which two were for the universities of Oxford and Cambridge, the third for training in a learned profession. In 1870, John Marius Wilson noted that the school had an income from endowments of £320 a year.

In 1882, the school moved to new premises called de Combe House on Mount Pleasant. On the new site the school had a house system, and houses included Nelson (red), Blake (blue), Hardy (green), and Drake (yellow).

In 1904, after a prolonged financial crisis, the school was closed. In the following year, Wadham School, an ordinary Board of Education secondary school, was opened at de Combe House.

The old school building in Abbey Street is now the church hall of the nearby parish church of St Bartholomew's, and is a Grade II listed building. Most of the grammar school’s artefacts were acquired by the St Martins Preparatory School and were later moved to the town's museum. Many carved initials dating from the 19th century survive in the dado panelling of the Abbey Street building.

== Notable former pupils ==
- James Mountford Allen (1809–1883), architect
- Charles Brooke (1829–1917), Rajah of Sarawak
- Thomas Hardy (1769–1839), captain of HMS Victory at the Battle of Trafalgar
- Marwood Munden (1885–1952), doctor and cricketer
- Matthew Warren (1642–1706), nonconformist minister and tutor
- William Best, 1st Baron Wynford (1767–1845), Chief Justice of the Common Pleas

== Masters of the grammar school ==
- 1547 John Byrde
- 1609–1613: Rev. James Wood
- 1613–1637: Rev. John Ball
- 1637–1645: Rev. Thomas Lambert M.A.
- 1645: Rev. Josiah Tompkins
- 1647: Mr. Jarvis Stipend
- 1647: James Metford
- 1838–1875: Rev. Charles Penny D.D.
- 1883: Rev. Frederic Weller M.A.

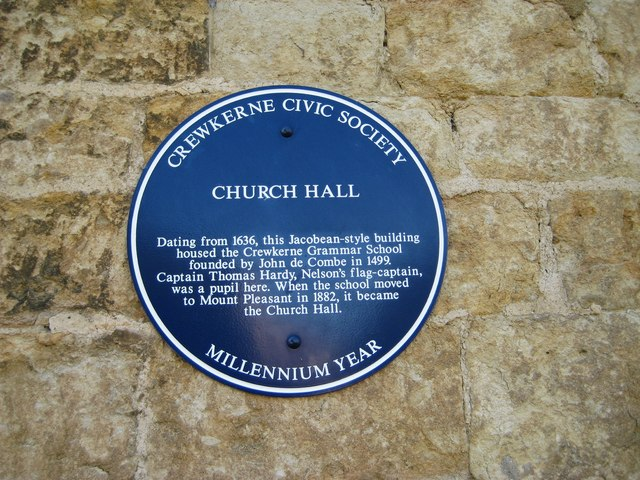
Blue plaque commemorating the use of the building by the school

== St Martins Preparatory School ==
In 1939, at an early point in the Second World War, the St Martins School, an independent boarding school, moved to Crewkerne from Thames Ditton, Berkshire, making use of the former Grammar School properties in Abbey Street, the gymnasium and hall in the town, the building opposite the hall, de Combe House, Mount Pleasant, and Chard Road.

In 1940, St Martins acquired the Crewkerne Grammar School playing fields.

In the 1980s St Martins Prep School was in Abbey Street. In 2003, it became a pre-school only and was renamed St Martins Day Nursery & Pre-School. This closed in 2012.

Little is known in Crewkerne of the school’s origins before 1939, but it is believed it occupied the site of a current school which was newly established in 1946.

=== Heads of St Martins ===
- 1964: Mr J. H. Blackmore
- 1976-1984: Lt. Col. Tony and Mrs Dowse-Brennan
- 1984-1991: Mr and Mrs Murrell
- 1991-2003 Julie Murrell
