= William de Stanwey =

13th-century English Dean of Exeter

William De Stanwey (sometimes recorded as Mgr William de stanwey) was Dean of Exeter between 1252 and 1268.

== Notes ==
Catholic Church titles
Preceded by Roger de Wynkleigh	Dean of Exeter; 1252–1268	Succeeded by Roger De Toriz
