= Roger de Toriz =

13th-century Dean of Exeter

Roger de Toriz was Dean of Exeter between 1268 and 1274.

== Notes ==
Catholic Church titles
Preceded by William de Stanwey	Dean of Exeter; 1268–1274	Succeeded by John Noble
