= Serlo (priest) =

13th-century English Dean of Exeter

Serlo was Dean of Exeter between 1225 and 1231. Previously he had been Rector of Colaton Raleigh.

== Notes ==
Catholic Church titles
Preceded by Inaugural appointment	Dean of Exeter; 1225–1231	Succeeded by Roger de Wynkleigh
