= St Luke's Church, Farnworth =

Coordinates: 53.3844°N 2.7273°W

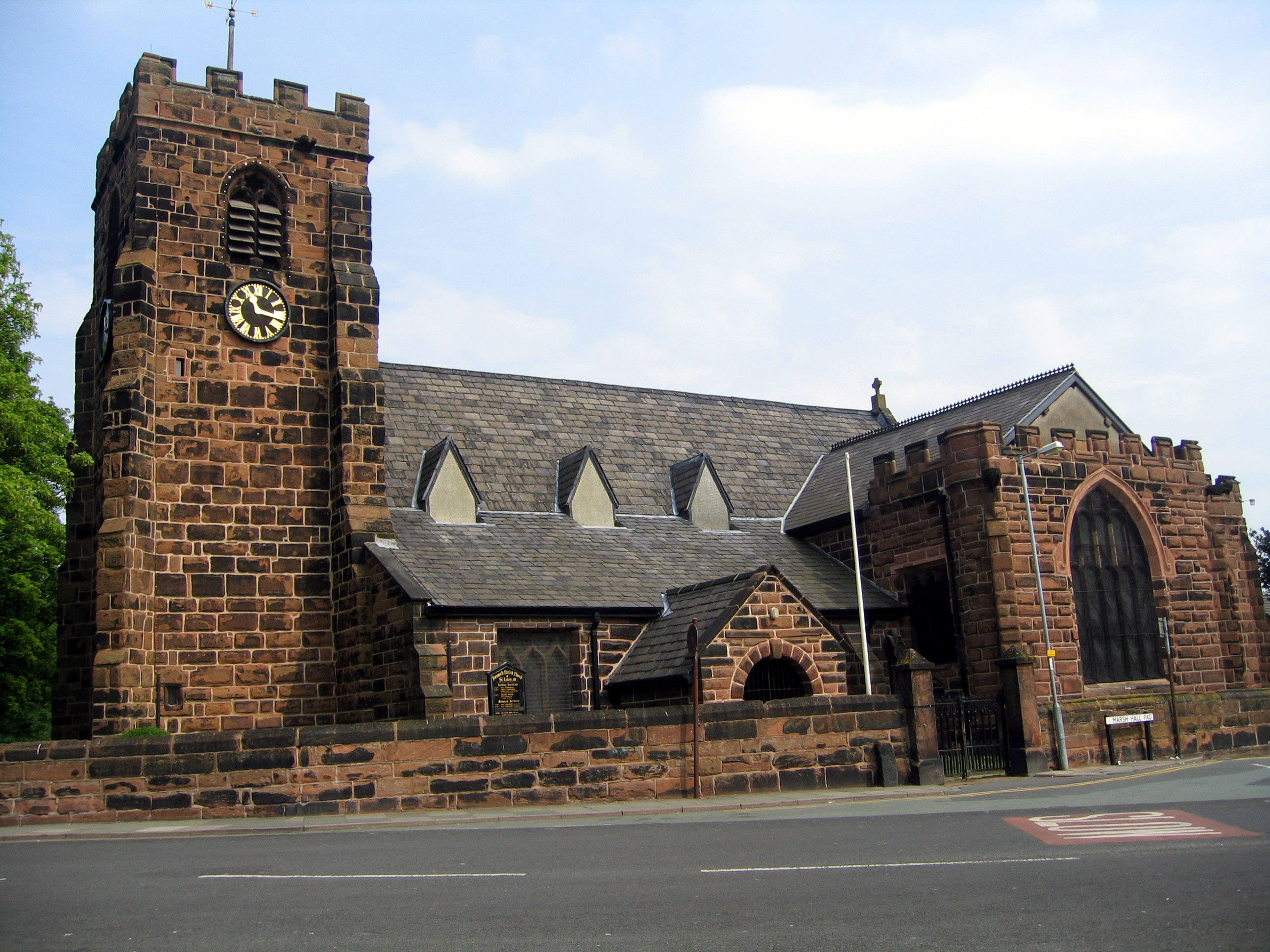
- St Luke's Church, Farnworth, from the south in 2007

- Location in Cheshire
- OS grid reference: SJ 516,877
- Location: Farnworth, Widnes, Cheshire
- Country: England
- Denomination: Anglican
- Website: Saint Luke, Farnworth

History
- Status: Parish church
- Dedication: Saint Luke

Architecture
- Functional status: Active
- Heritage designation: Grade II*
- Designated: 30 May 1963
- Architect: Paley, Austin and Paley
- Architectural type: Church
- Style: Gothic

Specifications
- Materials: Red sandstone, slate roof

Administration
- Province: York
- Diocese: Liverpool
- Archdeaconry: Warrington
- Deanery: Widnes
- Parish: Farnworth

Clergy
- Vicar: Team Rector = Revd Robert Lyon Pearson

St Luke's Church, Farnworth, Widnes, is a church in Farnworth, which was once a separate village but is now part of the town of Widnes in Cheshire, England. The church dates back to the 12th century and contains several items of historical interest, particularly hatchments and memorials. It is recorded in the National Heritage List for England as a designated Grade II* listed building, and is an active Anglican parish church in the diocese of Liverpool, the archdeaconry of Warrington and the deanery of Widnes.

== History ==
Farnworth is an ancient village, situated approximately 2 miles (3 km) north of the River Mersey in what used to be the county of Lancashire. It has now been subsumed into the town of Widnes in the borough of Halton, in the ceremonial county of Cheshire. Around 1180, a chapel dedicated to St Wilfrid was built in the village when it was known as St Wilfrids-on-the-Hill. It was a chapel of ease to the mother church at Prescot. Included within its boundaries were the townships of Bold, Appleton, Cronton, Cuerdley, Ditton and Penketh. Originally Farnworth was within the Mercian diocese of Lichfield but following the dissolution of the monasteries in 1541 when the abbey at Chester was converted into a cathedral and Farnworth became part of the diocese of Chester. In 1859, the church was re-dedicated to St Luke and, in 1880, it became a parish in the diocese of Liverpool.

Over the years the church has had a number of benefactors, one of the earliest being Yorfrid the first (and in its own right the only) Baron of Widnes (the barony passed to the Barons of Halton when his daughter married William FitzNigel, the 3rd Baron of Halton). Since then, over the centuries, the main benefactors have been the Bold family of the nearby township of Bold.

Over the centuries, the church has undergone several changes, both internally and externally. The first extension was about 1280–1300 when the north aisle was added. Between 1360 and 1380 the south aisle was added and around this time the tower was also built. The Bold Chantry (or Chapel) was added in 1406 and in 1431, the east end was extended. In 1500, the Cuerdley chapel was added to the south of the church. This was provided by Bishop William Smyth to allow his tenants in the village of Cuerdley to attend mass without coming into contact with the people of Farnworth at a time when plague was prevalent in the area. At a restoration in 1855 the nave, the north aisle and the Bold Chapel were rebuilt, the east end of the chancel was restored and the north side of the church and the vestry were repaired. A new roof was added to the nave. Galleries were built and the organ was moved into the gallery on the west wall. This restoration was carried out by William Culshaw. Farnworth became a separate parish in 1859. The last major internal restoration took place in 1894–95 when the galleries were removed and the plaster was stripped from the walls. Two new vestries were erected on the north side of the chancel and a new organ was installed. This restoration was carried out by the Lancaster architects Paley, Austin and Paley at a cost of £4,011 (equivalent to £460,000 in 2025).

== Architecture ==
=== Exterior ===
The church is built in red sandstone with a slate roof. Its plan consists of a west tower, a five-bay nave with a clerestory, north and south aisles, a south transept, north and south porches, and a chancel which is narrower and less lofty than the nave. The north aisle is almost fully occupied by the Bold chapel. To the north of the chancel are two vestries. The tower has corner buttresses, a curvilinear west window and smaller louvred windows on all faces at the bell-stage. A clock face is on the south side. The clerestory windows are pitched dormers. The tower, chancel and transept are crenellated and the chancel has crocketted finials.

=== Interior ===
The octagonal font is made from local sandstone. It has been dated to around 1280. It was placed on a circular plinth during the 1894–95 restoration. The altar is made from wood taken from the rood screen which was taken down at the Reformation. The screen under the tower arch dates from the 17th century. A pew behind the pulpit is dated 1607. In the church are seven hatchments on the walls of the nave relating to the Bold family, dating from 1762 to 1840. The lectern and pulpit date from the 1894–95 restoration. The stained glass in the north aisle dated 1876 was made by Morris & Co. and depicts the scene of the fiery furnace in the book of Daniel. The glass in the east window is by Burlison and Grylls, dated 1891, and that in the west window and in the east window in the transept are by Shrigley and Hunt. In the chancel are memorials to John and Edward Atherton who died respectively in 1826 and 1820 showing a sarcophagus in relief which is by T. Franceys and Spence of Liverpool. On the south wall is a pink marble tablet to the memory of the scientist Ferdinand Hurter who died in 1898.

In the Bold chapel, the communion table dates from the early 17th century. A sham book case in the chapel was formerly a concealed door dating from around 1810 which was originally in the library of Bold Hall. The monuments in the chapel are considered to be "one of the best collections in the county". The oldest is a crude effigy of a knight, probably Richard Bold, dating from around 1602. The others include memorials to another Richard Bold, who died in 1635, and his wife; to Richard Bold who died in 1704, which consists of a cartouche with cherubs; to Peter Bold who died in 1762 by B. Bromfield of Liverpool; and to Anna Maria Bold, who died in 1813, by G. Bullock. The memorial to Peter Patten Bold, dated 1822 and signed by Francis Chantrey is in white marble and depicts a woman kneeling over a pedestal. The memorial to Mary, Princess Sapieha (1795–1824) who died from tuberculosis only 2 years after her marriage, was made in Rome by Pietro Tenerani. Behind the altar is a white effigy to the memory of Alice Houghton, dated 1852. The organ was built by Peter Concaher and in 1986 it was restored by Reeves. There is a ring of six bells which were cast in 1956 by John Taylor and Company.

== External features ==
In the churchyard, there is a sundial that was originally located in the garden of Bold hall. It was given to the church after the demolition of the New Hall in 1899. Additionally, there is a column approximately 9 feet (3 m) in height, which is part of an old churchyard cross. In the southeast corner of the churchyard is a former bridewell dating from 1827 and constructed from sandstone with a slate roof. It is a Grade II listed building.

== The legend of the griffin ==
This tells the story of how a griffin was terrorising the people and the animals of the area. The village blacksmith was persuaded to fight it. After a prolonged battle, he emerged victorious, slaying the griffin and earning acclaim as a hero by the people and given the name of "The Bold". This is said to be the origin of the family name of Bold and the griffin appears on all the family's heraldic decorations.

== See also ==
- Grade I and II* listed buildings in Halton (borough)
- Listed buildings in Widnes
- List of works by Paley, Austin and Paley
- List of extant works by Culshaw and Sumners
