= John Cobethorn =

15th-century Dean of Exeter

John Cobethorn was Dean of Exeter between 1419 and 1457.

== Notes ==
Catholic Church titles
Preceded by Stephen Payn	Dean of Exeter; 1419–1457	Succeeded by John Hals
