= Farnworth, Cheshire =

Area of Widnes, Cheshire, England

Coordinates: 53.384°N 2.728°W

Farnworth
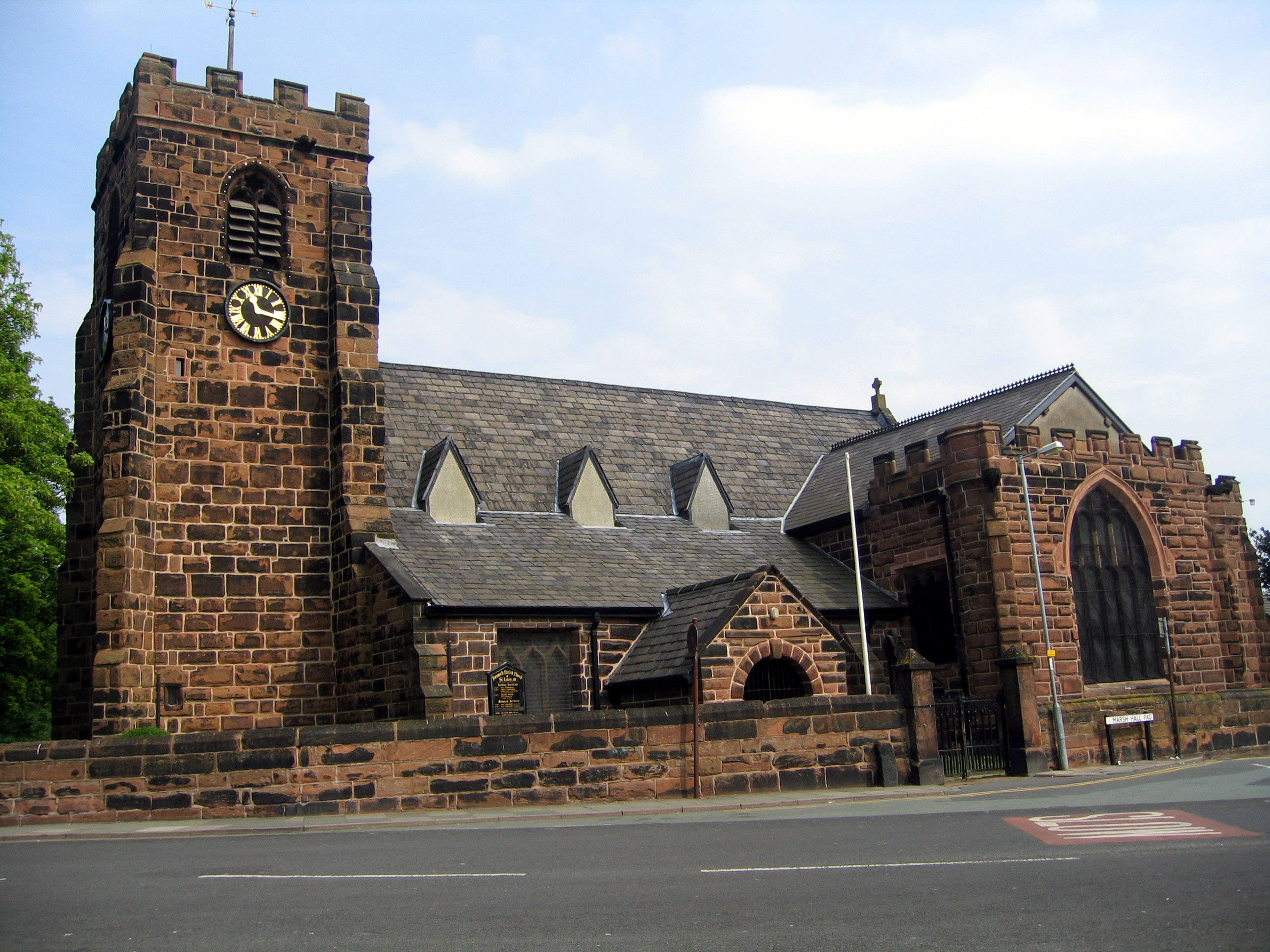
- St Luke's Church

- Location within Cheshire
- Population: 7,990 (in 2021)
- OS grid reference: SJ516877
- Unitary authority: Halton
- Ceremonial county: Cheshire
- Region: North West
- Country: England
- Sovereign state: United Kingdom
- Post town: WIDNES
- Postcode district: WA8
- Dialling code: 0151
- Police: Cheshire
- Fire: Cheshire
- Ambulance: North West
- UK Parliament: Widnes and Halewood

Farnworth is a northern area of the town of Widnes in Halton, Cheshire, England. Originally a village lying between Prescot and Penketh, it is an electoral ward in the Borough of Halton with a population of 7,990 in 2021.

== History ==
The name Farnworth derives from the Anglo-Saxon word fearn or fern and weorthig, meaning farm or estate, and it therefore means "fern-farm".

The village was established on higher ground 2 miles (3 km) to the north of the River Mersey and was for many years an isolated community. The earliest documentary evidence relating to the village is a charter dated 1352 when Henry, Duke of Lancaster established a halmote court for the manor of Widnes. The origins of the village are unknown. A chapel had been founded in the village about 1180 which was dedicated to St Wilfrid; it was enlarged in the 14th century and a tower added, and later re-dedicated to become St Luke's Church. At this time the village was part of the extensive parish of Prescot, and Farnworth had chapelry status.

A grammar school was established in the village in 1507 by Bishop William Smyth who had been born in the village. Bishop Smyth also founded a chapel in the church for the use of his tenants in the village of Cuerdley, and a footpath across the fields from Cuerdley to Farnworth; this was to allow the tenants to attend church without passing along the main street of Farnworth when the plague was present.

From around 1714, annual three-day wakes were held in October, when stalls were set up in the village street. On the first day, usually a Monday, there was bear-baiting and bull-baiting, and on the Tuesday horse and cattle sales were held. There were horse races and races for human participants. Each evening there was music and dancing in the Ring 'o Bells, the village public house. The wakes ended in 1863, to be followed by an annual show organised by the Farnworth Agricultural Society. This came to an end with the onset of World War I in 1914.

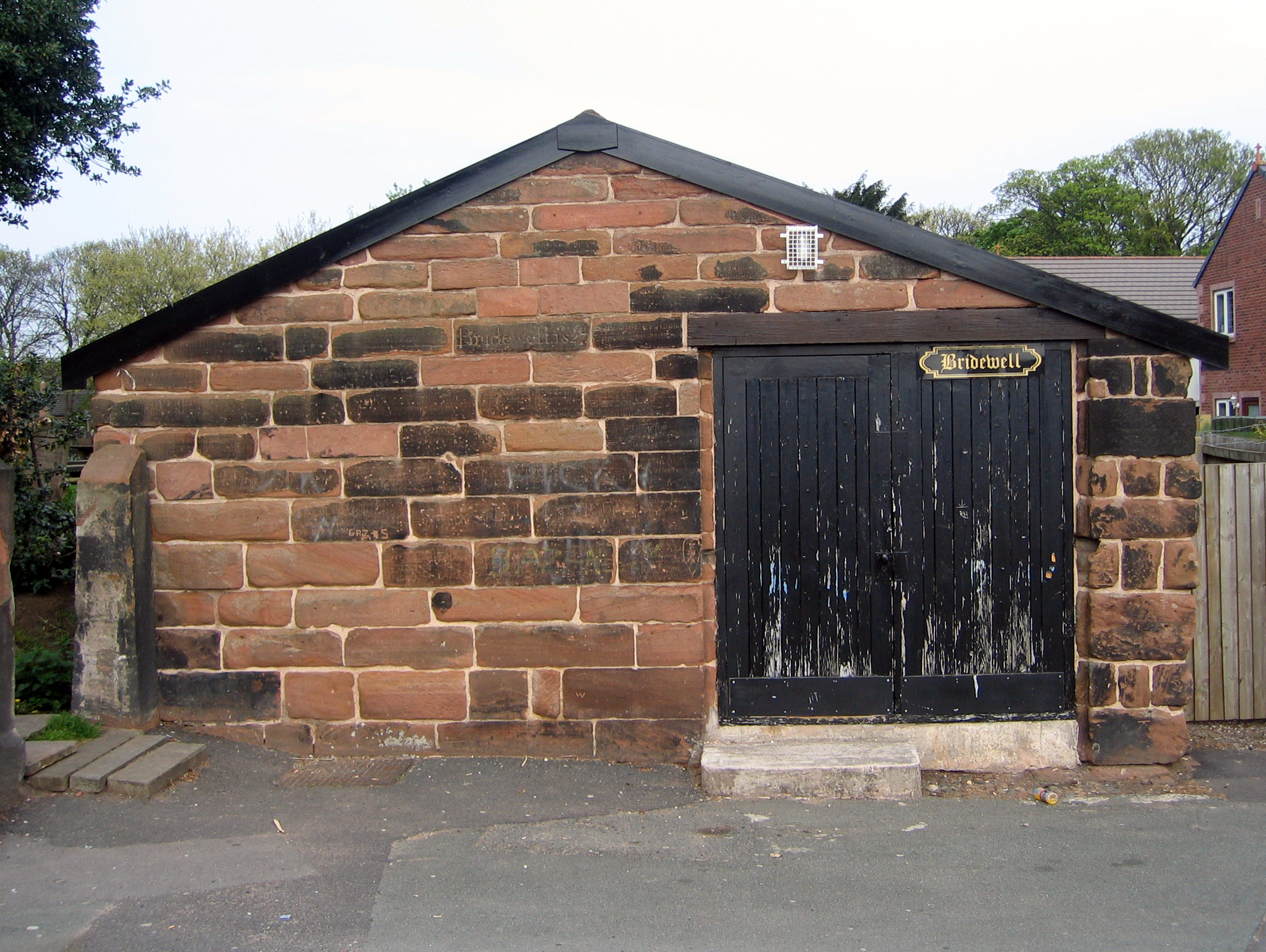
Bridewell

In 1827 a bridewell was built near the church, replacing the one formerly on the site from the 14th century. A Sunday school was held in the church from 1780 and a separate building to house it was built in 1831. Farnworth Church Day School was founded in the late 18th century and this was initially held in the Cuerdley chapel of the church. In 1842 it shared accommodation with the grammar school but moved into its own premises in Pit Lane in 1844–45, becoming Farnworth National School. Farnworth Methodist Chapel was opened in 1849.

Under the Local Government Act 1972, in April 1974 the area around Widnes, including Farnworth, was transferred from Lancashire to the new Borough of Halton, in the ceremonial county of Cheshire.

== Legend of the griffin ==
The legend states that the village was threatened by a griffin which was killed by the village blacksmith. He was named "Bold" and the tradition states that this is the origin of the local noble family of that name. The griffin is incorporated in the coat of arms of the Bold family.

== Notable people ==
Three men born in or near the village of Farnworth achieved prominent positions in the English church. They were William Smyth (c.1460–1514) who became Bishop of Coventry and Lichfield, then Bishop of Lincoln and who built the grammar school in the village; Richard Barnes (1532–1587) who became Bishop of Carlisle, then Bishop of Durham; and Richard Bancroft (1544–1610) who became Bishop of London and then Archbishop of Canterbury. Also born in the village was Roy Chadwick (1893–1947), the designer of the Avro Lancaster bomber.

== See also ==
- Listed buildings in Widnes
