= Richard de Coleton =

14th-century Dean of Exeter

Richard de Coleton was Dean of Exeter between 1327 and 1335.

== Notes ==
Catholic Church titles
Preceded by Bartholomew de Sancto Laurentio	Dean of Exeter; 1327–1335	Succeeded by Richard de Braylegh
