= Andrew de Kilkenny =

13th-century Dean of Exeter

Andrew de Kilkenny was Dean of Exeter between 1283 and 1302.

== Notes ==
Catholic Church titles
Preceded by John Pycot	Dean of Exeter; 1283–1302	Succeeded by Henry de Somerset
