= Richard Eyre (priest) =

Richard Montague Stephens Eyre (16 May 1929 – 12 December 2012) was an Anglican priest. He was the Dean of Exeter from 1981 to 1995.

Eyre was educated at Charterhouse School and Oriel College, Oxford. He was ordained as an Anglican priest in 1957 and began his ministry as a curate at St Mark's Portsea, Portsmouth. After this, he was a tutor at Chichester Theological College then a chaplain at Eastbourne College. From 1965 to 1973, he was the Vicar of Arundel and from 1975 to 1981, the Archdeacon of Chichester, before his appointment as the Dean of Exeter.

== See also ==
Church of England titles
Preceded by Clifford Chapman	Dean of Exeter; 1981– 1995	Succeeded by Keith Jones
