= Robert Sumpter =

14th-century Dean of Exeter

Robert Sumpter was the Dean of Exeter between 1363 and 1378.

== Notes ==
Catholic Church titles
Preceded by Reginald de Bugwell	Dean of Exeter; 1363–1378	Succeeded by Thomas Walkyngton
