= Thomas Lowe (priest) =

English cleric

The Very Reverend Thomas Lowe
- Dean of Exeter
- Church: Church of England
- Diocese: Diocese of Exeter
- Elected: 27 June 1839
- In office: 1839–1861
- Predecessor: Whittington Landon
- Successor: Charles John Ellicott
- Previous posts: Precentor and canon residentiary of Exeter Cathedral (1832–1839)

Personal details
- Born: Thomas Hill Peregrine Furye Lowe; 21 December 1781 Bromsgrove, Worcestershire, England
- Died: 17 January 1861 (aged 79) The Deanery, Exeter, Devon, England
- Buried: Exeter Cathedral
- Denomination: Anglican
- Spouse: Ellen Lucy Pardoe
- Children: 10
- Education: Westminster School; Trinity College, Oxford

Thomas Hill Peregrine Furye Lowe (21 December 1781 – 17 January 1861) was an English cleric. He was Dean of Exeter from 1839 to his death. His election followed a dispute between the chapter of Exeter Cathedral and the Crown over the right to choose the dean, which subsequently became the subject of proceedings in the Court of Queen's Bench.

== Life ==
Lowe was born at Bromsgrove, Worcestershire, the eldest son of Thomas Humphrey Lowe and his wife Lucy Hill. His maternal grandfather, Thomas Hill of Court of Hill, represented Leominster in Parliament.

Lowe was educated at Westminster School and Trinity College, Oxford, where he matriculated on 6 November 1799, aged 17. He graduated BA in 1805 and MA in 1818. Lowe was admitted as a student of Lincoln's Inn in 1804, but pursued a career in the Church of England.

He was a curate at Shelsley Beauchamp, Worcestershire, in 1810. In 1812 he had a post as domestic chaplain with Henry Hall Gage, 4th Viscount Gage, and in 1814 another curacy, at Diddlebury in Shropshire. In 1820 he became vicar of Grimley, Worcestershire. He was rector of Holy Trinity, Exeter from 1837 to 1840, and Dean of Exeter from 1839 for the rest of his life.

== Writings ==
In 1825 Lowe published An Essay on the Absolving Power of the Church, dealing with the authority to grant absolution in the offices for the ordination of Church of England priests.

His 1849 sermon The Sacredness of Life, and the Doom of Murder defended the retention of capital punishment on scriptural grounds. Historian James Gregory discusses the sermon as an example of Anglican opposition to the contemporary movement for abolition of the death penalty.

A sermon delivered by Lowe at Exeter Cathedral in November 1852 was published as Auricular Confession. It prompted a published response from Bishop Phillpotts, to which Lowe replied in Confession and Absolution, issued in an expanded second edition in 1853.

== Family ==
Lowe married in 1808 Ellen Lucy Pardoe (died 1843), eldest daughter of George Pardoe of Nash Court, Shropshire. Their children were:

- Lucy (died 1865 at age 56), married in 1828 Rev. Thomas James Rocke, as his first wife
- Helen (died 1881 at age 72), unmarried
- Thomas Lowe (born 1811, died in Australia)
- George Lowe (1813–1885), cleric, married 1842 Louisa, youngest daughter of Thomas Crookenden of Rushford Hall, Suffolk
- Arthur Lowe (1814–1882), naval officer, married: 1848 Katharina Ommaney, youngest daughter of John Acworth Ommanney R.N.; 1858 Florence Strode, younger daughter of George Strode of Newnham Park, Devon; 1864 Elizabeth Henrietta, eldest daughter of Henry Ducie Chads, R.N.
- Herbert Lowe, baptised 1816
- Noel Lowe (1817–1857), cleric, married 1847 Louisa Julia, younger daughter of John Moore-Stevens of Winscott, Devon
- Anna, baptised 1819, died unmarried 1880
- Emma, baptised 1821, died unmarried 1892
- Harriet, baptised 1822, died unmarried 1898.

Church of England titles
Preceded by Whittington Landon	Dean of Exeter; 1839–1861	Succeeded by Charles John Ellicott
