= Richard de Braylegh =

14th-century Dean of Exeter

Richard de Braylegh was Dean of Exeter between 1335 and 1353.

== Notes ==
Catholic Church titles
Preceded by Richard de Coleton	Dean of Exeter; 1335–1353	Succeeded by Reginald de Bugwell
