= Thomas Walkyngton =

14th-century Dean of Exeter

Thomas Walkyngton was Dean of Exeter between 1378 and 1385.

== Notes ==
Catholic Church titles
Preceded by Robert Sumpter	Dean of Exeter; 1378–1385	Succeeded by Ralph Tregrision
