= Whittington Landon =

English academic (c. 1758–1838)

Whittington Landon (c. 1758 – 29 December 1838) was an academic at the University of Oxford and an Anglican clergyman who became Dean of Exeter.

== Life ==
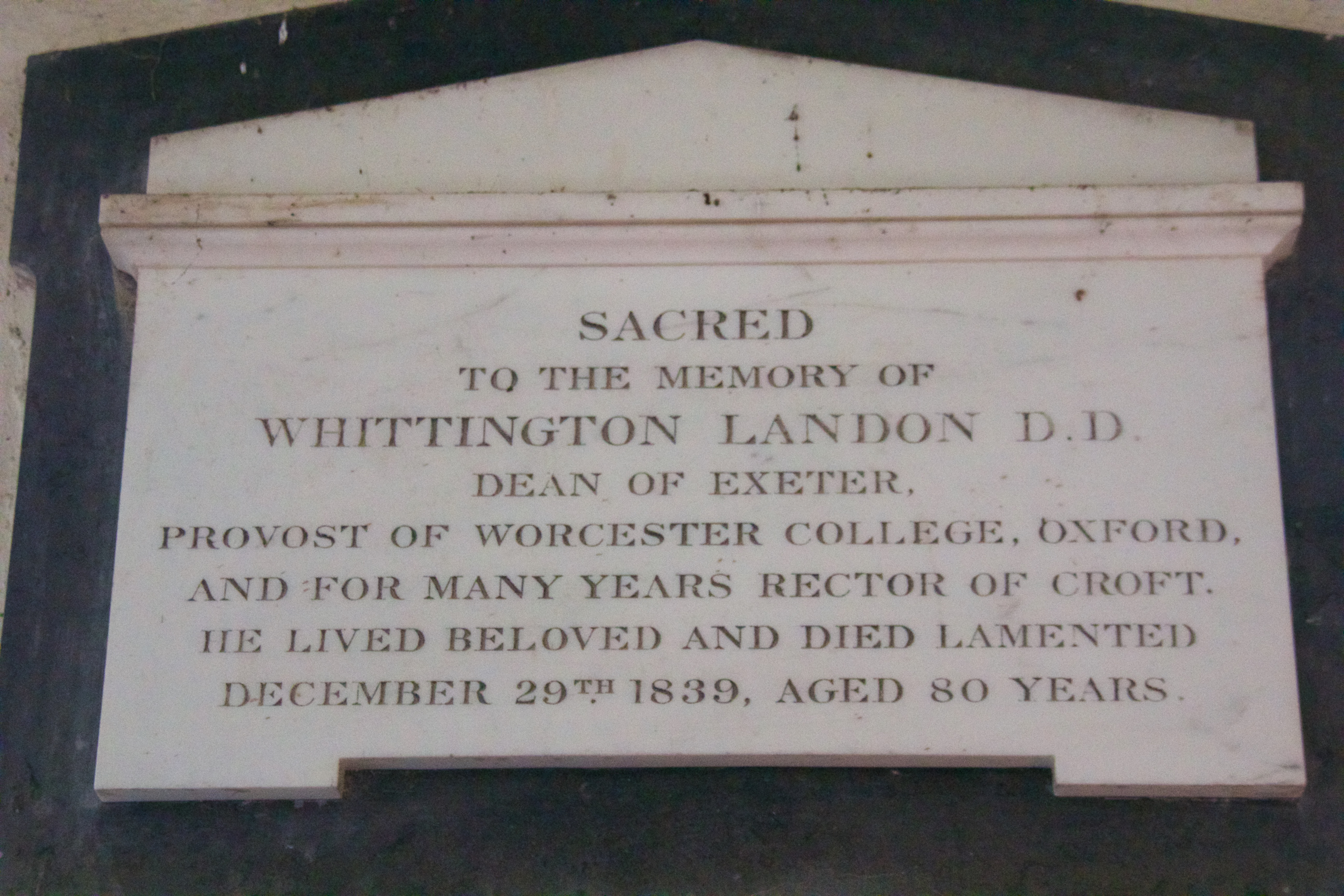
Memorial stone at St Michael and All Angels, Croft Castle

Whittington Landon, the son of John Landon from Tedstone, Herefordshire, matriculated at the University of Oxford as a member of Worcester College on 13 October 1775, aged 17. He obtained his Bachelor of Arts degree in 1779 and was elected to a college fellowship in 1782, the same year in which he took his Master of Arts. He obtained two further degrees: Bachelor of Divinity in 1790 and Doctor of Divinity in 1795. He was elected Provost of Worcester College in 1795, and held this position until his death. He was appointed Keeper of the Archives of the university in 1796, and held this post until 1815. He also served as vice-chancellor of the University from 1802 to 1806. He died on 29 December 1838.

Landon was also an ordained priest in the Church of England. He was rector of the Herefordshire parish of Croft with Yarpole from 1796 until his death in 1838. He added the positions of prebendary of Norwich (1811 to 1813) and of Salisbury (1821 until his death; he was vicar of the prebendary parish of Bishopstone, near Swindon from 1822 to 1826). He was Dean of Exeter (1813 until his death), and vicar of Branscombe, Devon (1827 to 1830).

His son J. W. R. Landon was also ordained, and followed Landon as vicar of Bishopstone. Landon was the uncle of the poet Letitia Elizabeth Landon, the daughter of his older brother John. Letitia's brother Whittington was named after him.

Academic offices
Preceded by William Sheffield	Provost of Worcester College, Oxford; 1795–1838	Succeeded by Richard Lynch Cotton
Preceded by Michael Marlow	Vice-Chancellor of Oxford University; 1802–1806	Succeeded by Henry Richards
Church of England titles
Preceded by John Garnett	Dean of Exeter; 1813 – 1838	Succeeded by Thomas Hill Lowe
