= Reginald de Bugwell =

14th-century Dean of Exeter

Reginald de Bugwell was Dean of Exeter between 1353 and 1363.

== Notes ==
Catholic Church titles
Preceded by Richard de Braylegh	Dean of Exeter; 1353–1363	Succeeded by Robert Sumpter
