= Stephen Payn =

15th-century Dean of Exeter

Stephen Payn was Dean of Exeter between 1415 and 1419. He was preceded by Ralph Tregrision and followed by John Cobethorn.

== Notes ==
Catholic Church titles
Preceded by Ralph Tregrision	Dean of Exeter; 1415–1419	Succeeded by John Cobethorn
