= John Noble (Dean of Exeter) =

13th-century Dean of Exeter

John Noble was Dean of Exeter between 1274 and 1280.

== Notes ==
Catholic Church titles
Preceded by Roger de Toriz	Dean of Exeter; 1274–1280	Succeeded by John Pycot
