= Marcus Knight (priest) =

English priest (1903–1988)

Marcus Knight FKC (11 September 1903 – 11 December 1988) was an Anglican priest. He was the Dean of Exeter in the Church of England from 1960 to 1972.

Knight was educated at Christ's Hospital and King's College London. After serving curacies in Stoke Newington and Ealing, he became the Priest-Vicar of Exeter Cathedral. After this, he served as the Vicar of Cockington before becoming the Rural Dean of Atherstone. He was a canon of St Paul's Cathedral, London from 1946 to 1960 when he was appointed as the Dean of Exeter. He was awarded an honorary doctorate by Exeter University.

Church of England titles
Preceded by Alexander Ross Wallace	Dean of Exeter; 1960– 1972	Succeeded by Clifford Thomas Chapman
