= John Arundel (bishop of Exeter) =

15th and 16th-century Bishop of Coventry and Lichfield

- Bishop of Exeter
- Appointed: 5 July 1502
- Term ended: 1504
- Predecessor: Richard Redman
- Successor: Hugh Oldham
- Previous post: Bishop of Coventry and Lichfield

Orders
- Consecration: 30 November 1496

Personal details
- Died: 1504
- Denomination: Catholic

John Arundel (died 1504) was a medieval Bishop of Coventry and Lichfield and Bishop of Exeter.

== Biography ==
Arundel was the son of Renfry Arundell, High Sheriff of Cornwall, and was educated at the college of Augustinian Canons in St. Columb and at Exeter College, Oxford.

Arundel was appointed a Canon of Windsor in 1479, a position he held until 1496.

After graduating with a Master's in Arts, Arundel was ordained and presented as rector to St. Columb Major. From 1482 to 1496 he served as Dean of Exeter and on 3 August 1496 was nominated as Bishop of Coventry and Lichfield and consecrated on 30 November 1496. He was translated to Exeter on 5 July 1502.

Arundel died in London in 1504 and lies buried in St. Clement's Church without Temple Bar.

== See also ==
- Arundell family

== Citations ==
Catholic Church titles
Preceded by Lionel Woodvile	Dean of Exeter; 1482–1496	Succeeded by Edward Willoughby
Preceded by William Smyth	Bishop of Coventry and Lichfield; 1496–1502	Succeeded by Geoffrey Blythe
Preceded by Richard Redman	Bishop of Exeter; 1502–1504	Succeeded by Hugh Oldham
