= Bartholomew de Sancto Laurentio =

14th-century Dean of Exeter

Bartholomew de Sancto Laurentio was the Dean of Exeter between 1311 and 1326.

== Notes ==
Catholic Church titles
Preceded by Thomas de Lechlade	Dean of Exeter; 1311–1326	Succeeded by Richard de Coleton
