= Clifford Chapman =

Dean of Exeter from 1973 to 1980

Clifford Chapman in 1979

Clifford Thomas Chapman FKC (23 May 1913 – 25 May 1982) was an Anglican priest. He was the Dean of Exeter in the Church of England from 1973 to 1980. Chapman was educated at Sir Walter St John’s School and King's College London. He was ordained in 1937 and began his ministry with curacies at All Saints' Child’s Hill and St Paul’s Winchmore Hill. After this he was the minister of the Church of Ascension Conventional District, Preston Road, Wembley and then the Rural Dean of Chelsea. From 1950 to 1961 he was the Rector of Abinger and from then until his appointment as the Dean of Exeter in 1973 he was a residentiary canon of Guildford Cathedral.

Church of England titles
Preceded by Marcus Knight	Dean of Exeter; 1973–1980	Succeeded by Richard Eyre
