= John Pycot =

13th-century Dean of Exeter

John Pycot was Dean of Exeter between 1280 and 1283.

Implicated in the murder of one of the Bishop of Exeter's men, Walter Lechlade, in the close of Exeter Cathedral on 5 November 1283 following a local feud, he was banished in December 1285 to a monastery.

Catholic Church titles
| Preceded by John Noble | Dean of Exeter; 1280–1283 | Succeeded by Andrew de Kilkenny |
