= Ralph Tregrision =

14th-century Dean of Exeter

Ralph Tregrision was Dean of Exeter between 1385 and 1415.

== Notes ==
Catholic Church titles
Preceded by Thomas Walkyngton	Dean of Exeter; 1385–1415	Succeeded by Stephen Payn
