= Thomas de Lechlade =

14th-century Dean of Exeter

Thomas de Lechlade was Dean of Exeter between 1307 and 1309.

== Notes ==
Catholic Church titles
Preceded by Henry de Somerset	Dean of Exeter; 1307–1309	Succeeded by Bartholomew de Sancto Laurentio
