= Henry Webber (priest) =

15th-century Dean of Exeter

Henry Webber was Dean of Exeter between 1459 and 1477.

== Notes ==
Catholic Church titles
Preceded by John Hals	Dean of Exeter; 1459–1477	Succeeded by Lionel Woodville
