= Dean of Exeter =

Head of the Chapter of Cathedral Church of Saint Peter in Exeter, England

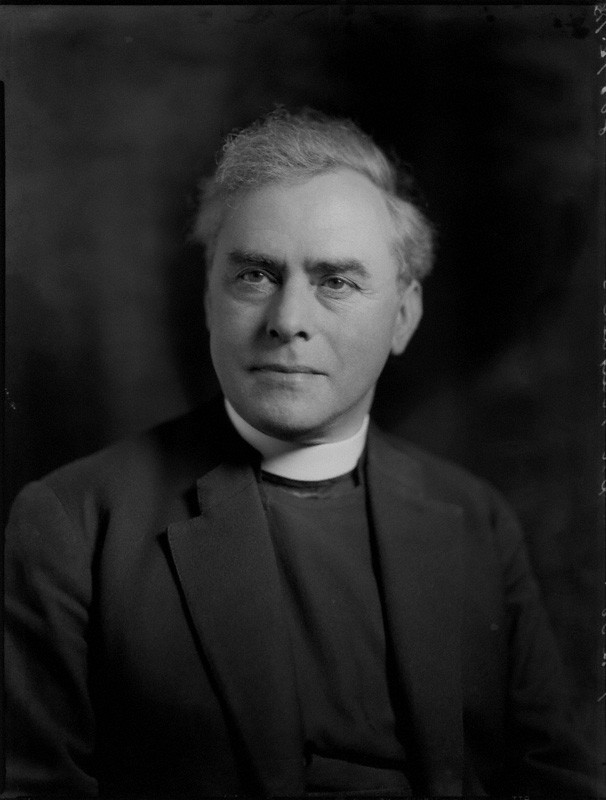
Walter Matthews, Dean of Exeter (1931-1934)

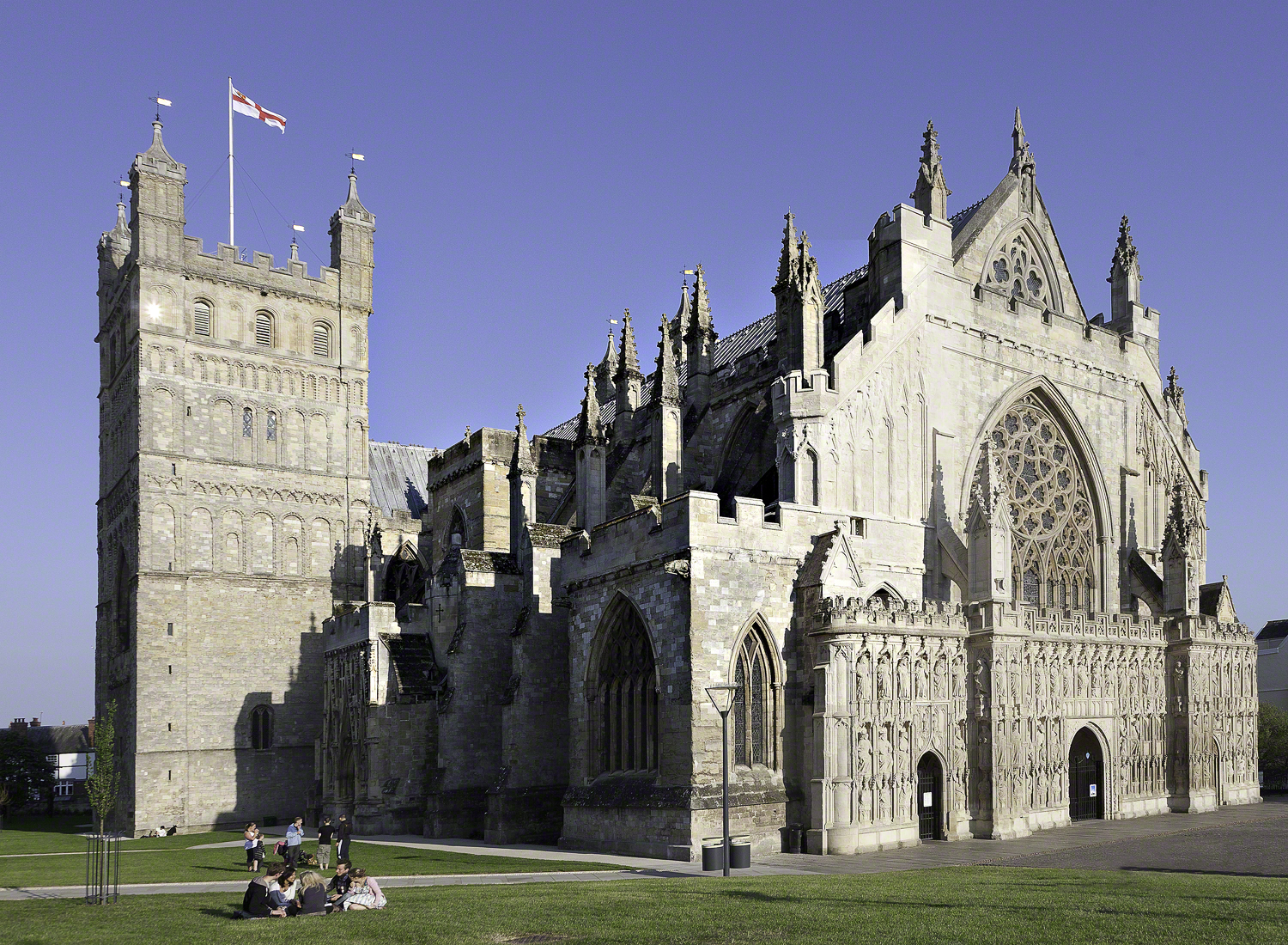
Exeter Cathedral, the maintenance of the structure and decoration of which is traditionally one of the principal duties of the dean

The Dean of Exeter is the head of the Chapter of Cathedral Church of Saint Peter in Exeter, England. The chapter was established by William Briwere, Bishop of Exeter (1224–44) who set up the offices of dean and chancellor of Exeter Cathedral, allowing the chapter to elect those officers. The deanery is at 10 The Close, Exeter. The current dean is Jonathan Greener.

== List of deans ==
=== High Medieval ===
- 1225–1231 Serlo
- 1231–1252 Roger de Wynkleigh
- 1252–1268 William de Stanwey
- 1268–1274 Roger de Toriz
- 1274–1280 John Noble
- 1280–1283 John Pycot
- 1283–1302 Andrew de Kilkenny

=== Late Medieval ===
- 1302–1307 Henry de Somerset
- 1307–1309 Thomas de Lechlade
- 1311–1326 Bartholomew de Sancto Laurentio
- 1328–1335 Richard de Coleton
- 1335–1353 Richard de Braylegh
- 1353–1363 Reginald de Bugwell
- 1363–1378 Robert Sumpter
- 1378–1385 Thomas Walkyngton
- 1385–1415 Ralph Tregrision
- 1415–1419 Stephen Payn
- 1419–1457 John Cobethorn
- 1457–1459 John Hals
- 1459–1477 Henry Webber
- 1477–1478 Peter Courtenay
- 1478–1482 Lionel Woodville
- 1482–1496 John Arundel

=== Early modern ===
- 1496–1509 Edward Willoughby
- 1509 Thomas Hobbes
- 1509–1519 John Vesey
- 1519–1527 Richard Pace
- 1527–1537 Reginald Pole
- 1537–1552 Simon Haynes
- 1553 James Haddon
- 1554–1558 Thomas Reynolds
- 1560–1570 Gregory Dodds
- 1571–1583 George Carew
- 1583–1588 Stephen Townesend
- 1589–1629 Matthew Sutcliffe
- 1629–1661 William Peterson
- 1661–1662 Seth Ward
- 1662–1663 Edward Young
- 1663–1680 George Cary (1611-1680), of Clovelly
- 1680–1701 The Hon Richard Annesley, later 3rd Baron Altham

(The Lord Altham from 1700)

- 1703–1705 William Wake
- 1705–1717 Lancelot Blackburne
- 1717–1726 Edward Trelawney
- 1726–1740 John Gilbert
- 1741–1742 Alured Clarke
- 1742–1748 William Holmes
- 1748–1762 Charles Lyttleton
- 1762–1784 Jeremiah Milles
- 1784–1790 William Buller
- 1790–1802 Charles Harward

=== Late modern ===
- 1803–1809 Charles Talbot
- 1809–1810 George Gordon
- 1810–1813 John Garnett
- 1813–1838 Whittington Landon
- 1839–1861 Thomas Lowe
- 1861–1863 Charles Ellicott
- 1863–1867 The Viscount Midleton
- 1867–1883 Archibald Boyd
- 1883–1900 Benjamin Cowie
- 1900–1918 Alfred Earle
- 1918–1931 Henry Gamble
- 1931–1934 Walter Matthews
- 1935–1950 Spencer Carpenter
- 1950–1960 Alexander Wallace
- 1960–1972 Marcus Knight
- 1973–1980 Clifford Chapman
- 1981–1995 Richard Eyre
- 1996–2004 Keith Jones
- 2005–2011 Jonathan Meyrick
- 2012–2017 Jonathan Draper
- 26 November 2017 – present Jonathan Greener
