= Kenedon =

Historic manor in Devon, England

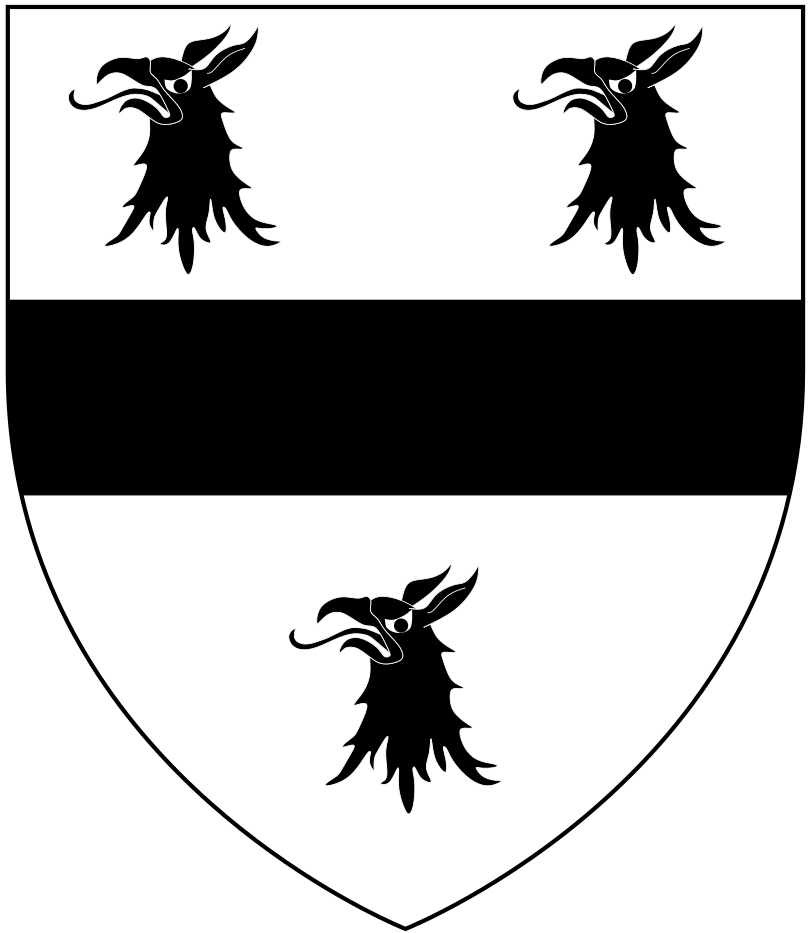
Arms of Hals of Kenedon: Argent, a fess between three griffin's heads erased sable

Kenedon is an historic manor situated in the parish of Sherford in Devon.

== History ==
It is listed in the Domesday Book of 1086 as Chenigedone, the 55th of the 58 Devonshire holdings of Ralph de Pomeroy, feudal baron of Berry Pomeroy, one of the Devon Domesday Book tenants-in-chief of King William the Conqueror. It was subsequently held by the Praulle (alias Prall) family, under the overlordship of the honour of Berry Pomeroy. Roger Prall held it in 1242 (during the reign of King Henry III (1216-1272)), and his descendants, two of whom were named William, held it for a further three generations. It then became the seat of John Hals (fl.1423) (son of John Hals of Lavant in Cornwall), a Justice of the Common Pleas and in 1423 a Justice of the King's Bench. His second son was John Hales (c. 1400-1490), Bishop of Coventry and Lichfield (1459-1490). The Bishop's great-uncle was Richard Hals (d.1418), a Canon of Exeter Cathedral in Devon, and Treasurer of Exeter Cathedral in 1400, who in 1414 was sent as Ambassador to Brittany. The Hals family held it for many generations, although they moved their seat to Efford in the parish of Egg Buckland, which manor they had inherited by the marriage of Richard III Hals (great-grandson of John Hals the judge) to Joan Whitley, 2nd daughter and co-heiress of Richard Whitley of Efford. Finally, following the death of Matthew Halse (1657/8-1684) of Efford without male progeny, the Hals estates descended to his sisters:

- Rebecca Hals (born 1661), 5th sister, heiress of Efford, wife of Henry Trelawny (c.1658-1702) of Whitleigh, Member of Parliament and Vice-Admiral of Cornwall, 7th son of Sir Jonathan Trelawny, 2nd Baronet (c.1623–1681). She was the mother of Sir Harry Trelawny, 5th Baronet (1687–1762), an aide-de-camp to the Duke of Marlborough and Member of Parliament.
- Amy Hals (born 1665), 6th sister, heiress of Kenedon, wife of Jonathan Elford of Bickham.

The mansion house was originally quadrangular in form, and is today represented by a small 16th c. farmhouse known as Keynedon, about 1 mile south of the village of Sherford. The early 15th century gate-tower of the house was demolished in about 1850.
