= Marwood Munden =

English soldier, doctor, and cricketer

Personal information
- Full name: Marwood Mintern Munden
- Born: 13 June 1885; Ilminster, Somerset, England
- Died: 8 March 1952 (aged 66); Eastcombe, Gloucestershire, England

Domestic team information
- Years: Team
- 1908: Somerset

Career statistics
Competition	FC
Matches	3
Runs scored	31
Batting average	6.20
100s/50s	0/0
Top score	11
Balls bowled	–
Wickets	0
Bowling average	–
5 wickets in innings	–
10 wickets in match	–
Best bowling	0
Catches/stumpings	0/–
- Source: CricketArchive, 22 December 2015

Marwood Mintern Munden (13 June 1885 – 8 March 1952) was a British doctor and cricketer who played three first-class cricket matches for Somerset in 1908. He was born in Ilminster, Somerset and died in Eastcombe, Gloucestershire. A substantial biographical note on him written by a member of his family on the Royal Army Medical Corps website says that he was known in the family as "Mintern Munden," not Marwood Munden.

== Background and early career ==
Munden was the third son and seventh child of the Ilminster doctor, Charles Munden. He was educated at Crewkerne Grammar School and then studied medicine at Guy's Hospital in London, qualifying in 1911. He married in 1912 and set up in general practice at Chalford, Gloucestershire.

== Cricket career ==
Munden made three appearances in first-class cricket for Somerset in the 1908 season as a batsman. He scored 11 in each innings of the match against Kent at the Crabble Athletic Ground, Dover in July. But returning for two matches in a week in August, he scored just nine against Hampshire. And then in the return match against Kent he failed to score in either innings.

== War service ==
Munden joined the Royal Army Medical Corps in 1916 and served with the 89th Field Ambulance and the second battalion of the Royal Fusiliers in France. He was awarded the Belgian Croix de Guerre for his work evacuating wounded Belgian troops. He was commissioned as a temporary lieutenant in 1918 and discharged at the end of the First World War.

== Later life ==
After the war, Munden returned to Gloucestershire, and remained there in general practice as a doctor until his death in 1952. He no longer played first-class cricket, but turned out for amateur sides including the Gloucester Gypsies touring team and also captained Stroud Cricket Club. He was also involved in hunting and fishing.
