= Spencer Carpenter =

Anglican priest and author (1877–1959)

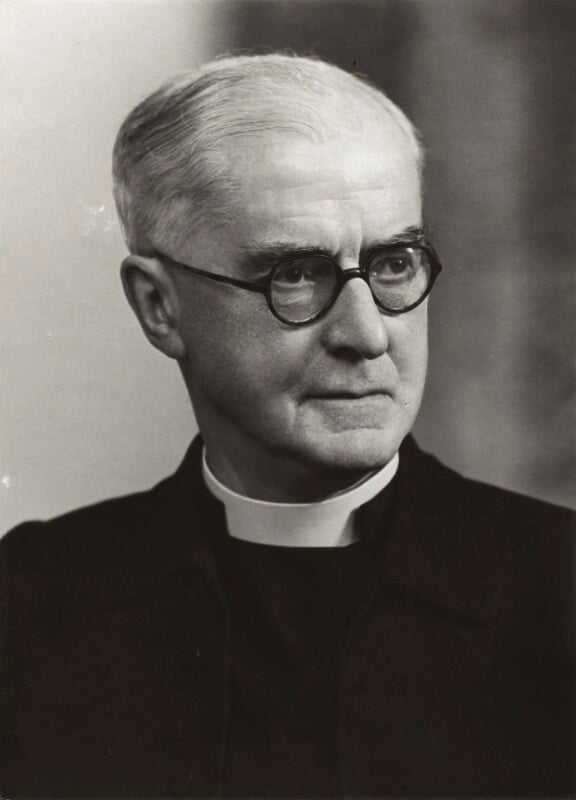
Carpenter in 1949

Spencer Cecil Carpenter (3 November 1877 – 19 August 1959) was an Anglican priest and author. He was the Dean of Exeter in the Church of England from 1935 to 1950.

Carpenter was educated at University College School and Gonville and Caius College, Cambridge. He was ordained in 1903 and began his ecclesiastical career with a curacy at St Paul's, Walworth. He was successively Vice-Principal of Westcott House, Cambridge; Warden of the Gonville and Caius College Mission in Battersea then Fellow and Tutor of Selwyn College, Cambridge. From 1922 to 1930 he was Vicar and Rural Dean of St Peter's, Bolton.

In 1929, he became an Honorary Chaplain to the King. In 1930, he left Selwyn to become simultaneously Master of the Temple in London and Professor of Theology at Queen's College, Harley Street. He retained all three positions until his appointment to the Deanery in 1935. In the same year, he also became Provost of King's College, Taunton, a position he held until 1953.

== Works ==
- A Parson’s Defence, 1912
- Christianity according to St Luke, 1919
- A Large Room, 1923
- The Anglican Tradition, 1928
- The Church and Politics, 1934
- The Bible View of Life, 1937
- Faith in Time of War, 1940
- Exeter Cathedral, 1942
- Life of Bishop Winnington-Ingram, 1949
- The Church in England, 597–1688, 1954
- Duncan-Jones of Chichester, 1956
- Eighteenth Century Church and People, 1959

Church of England titles
Preceded by Walter Robert Matthews	Dean of Exeter; 1935–1950	Succeeded by Alexander Ross Wallace
