= Henry de Somerset =

14th-century English Dean of Exeter

Henry de Somerset (died 1307) was an English churchman who served as the Dean of Exeter between 1302 and 1307.

== Notes ==
Catholic Church titles
Preceded by Andrew de Kilkenny	Dean of Exeter; 1302–1307	Succeeded by Thomas de Lechlade
