= A. D. S. N. Prasad =

Indian NGO founder (1952–2015)

- Born: 29 March 1952; Mysore, Karnataka, India
- Died: 8 September 2015 (aged 63); Chennai, India
- Education: All India Institute of Speech and Hearing
- Occupations: Founder - Director, Pathway Centers for Children
- Known for: Special education
- Spouse: Chandra Prasad
- Children: 1
- Website: pathway.org.in

Dr. A. D. S. N. Prasad is the founder of Pathway Centers for Children, a non-profit and non governmental organization located in Chennai and other rural parts of Tamil Nadu, India, that is dedicated to the welfare of children with mental handicap and those who are destitute or otherwise disadvantaged.

== Pathway Centers for Children ==
As a 22-year-old speech pathologist and audiologist, Prasad learned that to pay for his professional services clients quite often would have to sell everything they had and would make great sacrifices. Impressed by this, he eventually started giving free services to whoever needed it.

Prasad established Pathway with a motive to help those were underprivileged and disadvantaged in the society.

== Writing ==
A biography on Prasad's, life "Prasad Enroru Thai" (Tamil: பிரசாத் என்றொ௫ தாய்)was released in October 2008.

== Awards ==
- Award for "Services Rendered to the Mentally Disabled" Council of Parent's Association of the Mentally Retarded, Chennai 2002.
- "Vocational Excellence" Award to A.D.S.N. Prasad for his services to the Disabled - Rotary Club International, 1999.
- 1998 Award for "Most Outstanding Institution in India Serving the Disabled" and "Most Outstanding Employer of the Disabled in India" - Prime Minister of India, Mr. Atal Bihari Vajpayee.
- "Best Institution Serving the Disabled" - Chief Minister of Tamil Nadu, Ms. J. Jayalalithaa, 1995.
- "Best Employer of the Disabled" - Social Welfare Minister, Government of Tamil Nadu, 1995.'
- "Best Employees" awarded to two Special Pathway Employees - Social Welfare Minister, Government of Tamil Nadu, 1995.
- "Exceptional Contribution for Services to People" Government of Karnataka, 1995.
- "Services Rendered to the Mentally Disabled in India" - Japanese SIVUS Council, 1993.
