= William Sheffield (academic) =

British academic (c. 1732 – 1795)

- Born: c.1732
- Died: 1795
- Occupations: College head; museum keeper
- Employer(s): Worcester College, Oxford; Ashmolean Museum
- Known for: Provost of Worcester College; Keeper of the Ashmolean Museum

William Sheffield (c. 1732 – 1795) was an English college head and museum curator.

== Career ==
Sheffield was Keeper (head) of the Ashmolean Museum from 1772 until his death. He was also Provost of Worcester College from 1777 at the University of Oxford until his death, succeeding William Gower. Along with Stephen Long Jacob, a Fellow of the college, he was a plantsman and instrumental in developing 26 acres of newly acquired land at the college, including tree-planting.

Academic offices
Preceded by William Gower	Provost of Worcester College, Oxford; 1777–1795	Succeeded by Whittington Landon
