= Thomas Hobbes (priest) =

Dean of Exeter

Thomas Hobbes was Dean of Exeter during 1509.
