= Stephen Townesend (priest) =

Stephen Townesend was Dean of Exeter between 1583 and 1588.

== Notes ==
Religious titles
Preceded by George Carew	Dean of Exeter; 1583–1588	Succeeded by Matthew Sutcliffe
