= Sherford (near Kingsbridge) =

Village in Devon, England

Coordinates: 50°17′07″N 3°42′55″W

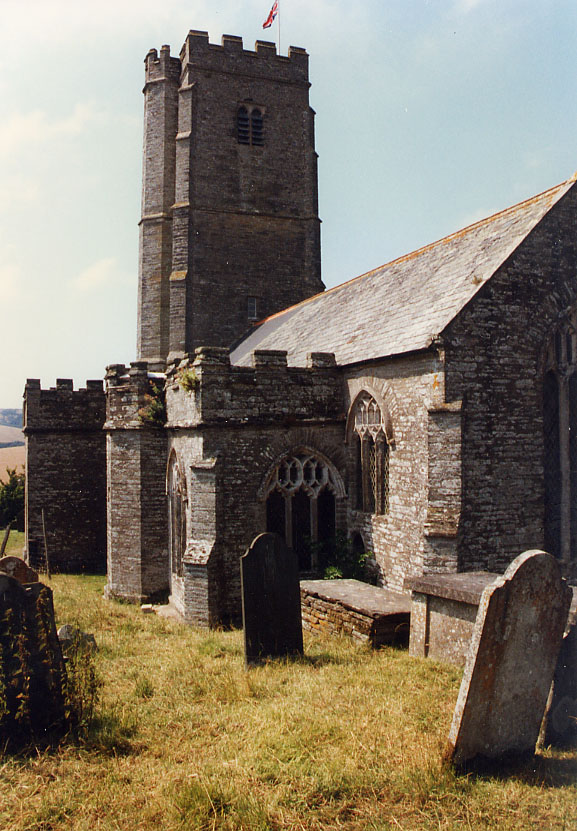
- St Martin's Church, Sherford

- Location within Devon
- Civil parish: Frogmore and Sherford
- District: South Hams
- Shire county: Devon
- Region: South West
- Country: England
- Sovereign state: United Kingdom

Sherford is a village and former civil parish and manor, now in the parish of Frogmore and Sherford, in the South Hams district, in the county of Devon, England. It is situated about 2 1/2 miles (4 km) east of the town of Kingsbridge. It should not be confused with the new town Sherford to be built on the outskirts of Plymouth, about 18 miles (29 km) to the north-west. The parish church is dedicated to Saint Martin of Tours. In 1961 the parish had a population of 258. On 1 April 1986 the parish was abolished and merged with parts of South Pool and Charleton to form "Frogmore and Sherford". Sherford was recorded in the Domesday Book as Sireford/Sirefort/Sireforda.

== Historic estates ==
Within the parish are various historic estates including:

=== Kenedon ===
Kenedon, a manor listed in the Domesday Book of 1086 as Chenigedone, later a seat of the Hals family. The mansion house is today represented by a small 16th c. farmhouse known as Keynedon, about 1 mile (1.6 km) south of the village of Sherford.

=== Malston ===
Malston, a seat of the Reynell family of East Ogwell, which two manors they had inherited in the 14th century, on the marriage of Walter Reynell (fl.1363/4) (from Cambridgeshire) to Margaret Stighull, daughter and heiress of William Stighull of Malston and East Ogwell.

=== Stancombe Dawney ===
Stancombe Dawney, in the parish of Sherford. It came into the possession of the Pollexfen family in 1624. It was the birthplace of Henry Pollexfen (1632–1691), of Nutwell in the parish of Woodbury, Devon, Lord Chief Justice of the Common Pleas. In about 1730 it passed to the Drake family of Buckland Monachorum, and in 1758 was sold by Sir Francis Henry Drake, 5th Baronet (1723–1794) to John Furlong. In 1778 it became the property of the Cornish family who held it in 1911.
