= John de Comb =

John de Comb (or Combe) was the member of Parliament for Gloucester in the Parliament of 1305.
