= William Smyth =

English bishop (c. 1460–1514)

The Right Reverend William Smyth
- Bishop of Lincoln
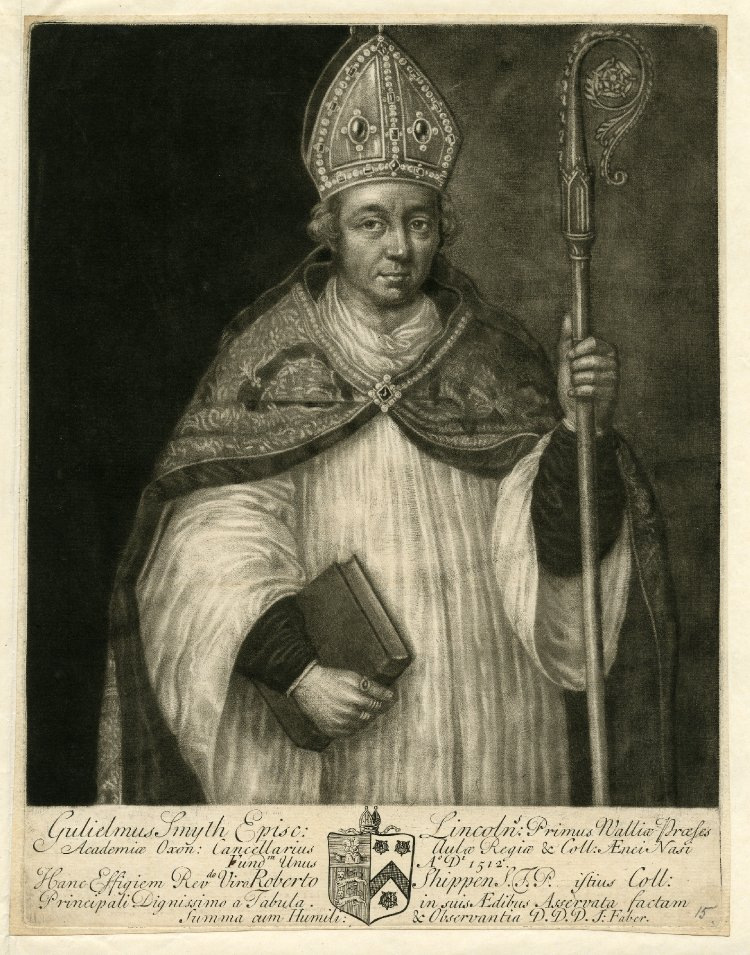
- Church: Roman Catholic
- Appointed: 6 November 1496
- Term ended: 2 January 1514
- Predecessor: John Russell
- Successor: Thomas Wolsey
- Previous post: Bishop of Coventry and Lichfield

Orders
- Consecration: 3 February 1493 by John Morton

Personal details
- Born: c. 1460 Farnworth, Widnes, Lancashire
- Died: 2 January 1514 Buckden Palace

William Smyth (or Smith) (c. 1460 – 2 January 1514) was Bishop of Coventry and Lichfield from 1493 to 1496 and then Bishop of Lincoln until his death. He held political offices, the most important being Lord President of the Council of Wales and the Marches. He became very wealthy and was a benefactor of a number of institutions. He was a co-founder of Brasenose College, Oxford and endowed a grammar school in the village of his birth in Lancashire.

== Early life and education ==
Smyth was born in the south Lancashire village of Farnworth in the parish of Prescot, which now falls within the town of Widnes in the Borough of Halton. Smyth was the fourth son of Robert Smyth of Peel Hall. He was allegedly brought up during his youth at nearby Knowsley Hall, the home of Thomas Stanley, 1st Earl of Derby. At this time Stanley was married to his second wife Lady Margaret, Countess of Richmond. Lady Margaret was the mother of the future Henry VII by her previous marriage to Edmund Tudor, 1st Earl of Richmond, and she was to have an important influence in Smyth's life.

Smyth went to the University of Oxford. His college is uncertain, being either Oriel or Lincoln, or both in succession. In 1476 he gained the degree of bachelor of canon law and by 1492 he had received the degree of bachelor of civil law.

== Ecclesiastical life ==
On 24 September 1485, one month after the battle of Bosworth and the consequent accession to the throne of Henry VII, Smyth was given the benefice of the deanery of Wimborne, Dorset, where Lady Margaret's parents were buried. On 20 October 1485 he was made a canon and prebendary of St Stephen's Chapel in the Palace of Westminster, where he became dean in 1490. He later obtained the livings of Combe Martin, Devon, of Great Grimsby and on 14 June 1492 he was instituted as rector of Cheshunt, Hertfordshire. It is not possible to be sure about all his preferments because of his common name.

On 1 October 1492 he became bishop of Coventry and Lichfield and was consecrated on 3 February 1493 by Archbishop Morton. On 6 November 1496 he was translated to the diocese of Lincoln.

== Political life ==
On 20 September 1485 Smyth gained a place in the Court of Chancery as keeper of the hanaper which gave him a salary for life. In 1486 he obtained a grant for the custody of the daughters of Edward IV. In 1493 Smyth was appointed a member of Prince Arthur's Council of Wales and the Marches. In 1500 he was made Chancellor of the University of Oxford.

Prince Arthur died in April 1502 and in August of that year Smyth became Lord President of Wales, giving him full responsibility for the exercise of royal power in Wales and the marches. He continued to hold this post until at least 1512 or, possibly, until his death. By August 1502 he was no longer Chancellor of Oxford University.

== Philanthropy ==
In November 1495 Smyth refounded the hospital of St John the Baptist in Lichfield and added to it a school for poor children. In 1500 he founded the Cuerdley Chapel which was added to the south aisle of St Luke's Church, Farnworth for the use of his tenants from Cuerdley. The nearby village of Cuerdley was the seat of the very ancient Smith family of Cuerdley his armorial progenitors from which the renowned Captain John Smith also claimed his lineage. He purchased land including a footpath from the village to the church to allow entry for his tenants by a separate door to avoid contact with the residents of Farnworth at the time of the plague. In 1507 he made an endowment of £350 to found a grammar school in Farnworth, the village of his birth.

Also in 1507 Smyth founded a fellowship in Oriel College, Oxford, and gave manors to Lincoln College. Around the same time he and Sir Richard Sutton set out to found a new college in Oxford. They rebuilt Brasenose Hall, added other existing halls to it, and having obtained a charter in 1512, called it "The King's haule and college of Brasennose". This is now Brasenose College. Smyth's intention at the college was to benefit clergy from the north of England. The twelve fellows of the college were to have been born in the diocese of Coventry and Lichfield, or to have come from Lancashire, and particularly from the area of his birthplace. He gave to the college his lands of Cold Norton and, by his will, a considerable legacy of lands, plate, vestments, manuscripts and books.

== Reputation and legacy ==
Smyth's ecclesiastical, legal and political duties resulted in his having a very busy life, only at times being resident in his diocese. He was very wealthy and was described by Hugh Latimer as being one of the "unpreaching prelates"; no sermons by him survive. He indulged in nepotism. Matthew Smyth was the first principal of Brasenose College, a William Smyth was archdeacon of Northampton and then of Lincoln and another William Smyth was appointed to St John's Hospital at Lichfield.

William Smyth died on 2 January 1514 at Buckden Palace, now in Cambridgeshire, one of the residences of the bishops of Lincoln. In addition to bequests to Brasenose College and Lincoln Cathedral, he made provision for a hospital at Banbury. He is buried in Lincoln Cathedral.

== Citations ==
Academic offices
Preceded by John Morton	Chancellor of the University of Oxford; 1500–1502	Succeeded by Richard Mayew
Catholic Church titles
Preceded by John Hales	Bishop of Coventry and Lichfield; 1492–1496	Succeeded by John Arundel
Preceded by John Russell	Bishop of Lincoln; 1496–1514	Succeeded by Thomas Wolsey
