= Armorial of bishops of Exeter =

Wikimedia list article

Arms of the diocese: Gules, a sword in pale, point towards the chief, hilted and pommelled or, enfiling two keys in saltire or.

Old diocesan arms: Gules, two keys addorsed in bend sinister or, enfiled by a sword in bend argent pommelled and hilted gold.

The Diocese of Exeter has existed since 1050, when Bishop Leofric moved the seat of his diocese from Crediton.

== Diocesan arms ==
The current version of the arms, containing an upright sword (for St.Paul) and keys in saltire (for St.Peter), dates from the late 15th or early 16th century. It is variously shown with the sword below, between (enfiling), or on top of (surmounting) the keys.

Prior to the modern arms being adopted, the sword was is bend, either sinister (bottom left to top right) or dexter (top left to bottom right), and the keys were side by side in bend in the opposite direction, either addorsed (wards facing away from each other) or accosted (wards facing the same direction).

== Arms of bishops ==
=== 11th-14th centuries ===
Heraldry developed in the mid-12th century. Arms of earlier bishops are later attributions.

Arms	Bishop and blazon
	Leofric, Bishop 1050–1072 Escutcheon: Or, on a cross flory sable a mitre of the field.
	Osbern FitzOsbern, Bishop 1071–1103 Escutcheon: Gules, a bend argent beneath a fess or.
	William Warelwast, Bishop 1107–1138 Escutcheon: Azure, a saltire or. An alternative attribution is Gules, two keys paleways, impaling, Or, a sword point upwards.
	Robert Warelwast, Bishop 1138–1155 Escutcheon: Azure, a saltire or. An alternative attribution is Gules, two keys paleways, impaling, Or, a sword point upwards.
	Robert of Chichester, Bishop 1155–1160 Escutcheon: Chequy or and gules, a chief vair. These arms originally belonged to the Raleigh family of Raleigh in Pilton, Devon, and weren't inherited by the Chichesters until at least the late 14th century, through marriage to the Raleigh heiress, despite which they appear in Exeter Cathedral's Great East Window to represent Robert. It is also not certain that Robert was a member of the same Chichester family.
	Bartholomew Iscanus, Bishop 1161–1184 Escutcheon: Per pale gules and sable (sable and argent, West.), six dolphins argent. Arms are alternatively given as Per pale sable and argent, six dolphins counter-changed.
	John the Chanter, Bishop 1186–1191 Escutcheon: Argent, a cross and a chief sable.
	Henry Marshal, Bishop 1194–1206 Escutcheon: Or, a lion rampant gules, a bordure azure mitred of the first. Alternative arms attributed to Marshal are the arms of his brother, William, Earl of Pembroke: Per pale or and vert, a lion rampant gules.
	Simon of Apulia, Bishop 1214–1223 Escutcheon: Azure, three mitres or.
	William Briwere. Bishop 1224–1244 Escutcheon: Gules, a bend wavy or. Brewer's arms are also shown within a bordure azure charged with alternate keys and mitres.
	Richard Blund, Bishop 1245–1257 Escutcheon: Lozengy or and sable.
	Walter Branscombe, Bishop 1258–1280 Escutcheon: Or, on a chevron sable between two keys palewise in chief and a sword in base of the second, three cinquefoils of the first. The flowers on the chevron are alternatively blazoned as gillyflowers. The keys and sword are alternatively shown white (in breach of the rule of tincture).
	Peter Quinel, Bishop 1280–1291 Escutcheon: Azure, a cross argent, two roses in chief, two fleurdelys in base or
	Thomas Bitton, Bishop 1291–1307 Escutcheon: Ermine, a fess gules.
	Walter de Stapledon, Bishop 1308–1326 Escutcheon: Argent, two bends wavy sable, a bordure azure double keyed or. The bends are alternatively blazoned nebuly. The keys are sometimes shown erect rather than in saltire.
	James Berkeley, Bishop 1326–1327 Escutcheon: Gules, a chevron between ten crosses pattee argent, an annulet for difference.
	John Grandisson, Bishop 1327–1329 Escutcheon: Paly of six argent and azure, on a bend gules a mitre between two eagles displayed or. The mitre on the bend replaces a third eagle in the Grandisson family arms.
	Thomas de Brantingham, Bishop 1370–1394 Escutcheon: Sable, a fess counter-embattled between three Catherine wheels or.
	Edmund Stafford, Bishop 1395–1419 Escutcheon: Or, a chevron gules, a bordure azure semée of mitres of the field.

=== 15th-17th centuries ===
Arms	Bishop and blazon
	John Catterick, Bishop 1419 Escutcheon: Argent, on a fess engrailed sable three trefoils or. An alternative coat is Sable, three cats passant gardant in pale argent.
	Edmund Lacey, Bishop 1420–1455 Escutcheon: Azure, three shovellers' heads erased or.
	George Neville, Bishop 1458–1465 Escutcheon: Gules, a saltier argent and label compony argent and azure. These arms are also recorded as quartering Argent, three lozenges in fess gules (in a bordure) and Or, an eagle displayed vert..
	John Booth, Bishop 1465–1478 Escutcheon: Argent, three boars' heads erased erect sable, a label gules. The label is alternatively blazoned azure.
	Peter Courtenay, Bishop 1478–1487 Escutcheon: Or, three torteaux, a label azure charged with nine plates. Alternatively, the label is charged with three mitres, nine mitres, or nine annulets.
	Richard Foxe, Bishop 1487–1492 Escutcheon: Azure, a pelican in piety or. Alternatively, in a bordure or, with a canton ermine, or both bordure and canton.
	Oliver King, Bishop 1493–1495 Escutcheon: Argent, on a chevron sable three escallops of the field. Alternatives- Argent, a fess engrailed between two crowns sable, Quartering, Party per chevron argent and azure, three lions rampant counterchanged, those in chief combatant, and Party per fess gules and argent, three roses counterchanged.
	Richard Redman, Bishop 1496–1502 Escutcheon: Gules, three cushions ermine (Redman); quartering Gules, a lion rampant argent, on his shoulder a fleurdelys (Aldborough).
	John Arundel, Bishop 1502–1504 Escutcheon: Sable, six martlets three, two and one argent.
	Hugh Oldham, Bishop 1505–1519 Escutcheon: Sable, a chevron or between three owls argent, on a chief or three roses gules.
	John Vesey, Bishop 1519-1551 and 1553–1554 Escutcheon: Argent, on a cross sable a buck's head couped between four martlets of the field, on a chief azure a cross patonce between two roses or. Alternatively, the cross is cabossed.
	Myles Coverdale, Bishop 1551–1553 Escutcheon: Quarterly, per fess indented gules and or, a rose between two fleurs-de-lys in chief and a fleur-de-lys between two roses in base, all counterchanged.
	James Turberville, Bishop 1555–1560 Escutcheon: Ermine, a lion rampant gules crowned or. The field is alternatively blazoned argent.
	William Alley, Bishop 1560–1571 Escutcheon: Azure, a pale engrailed ermine between two lions rampant argent. Alternatively, the pale is not engrailed, the liones are ermine and are crowned.
	William Bradbridge, Bishop 1571–1578 Escutcheon: Azure, a pheon argent.
	John Woolton, Bishop 1579–1594 Escutcheon: Or, a lion rampant supporting a saltier engrailed humette gules. Alternatives- Gules, a saltier engrailed or and Argent, three standing cups with covers sable. (His mother's coat).
	Gervase Babington, Bishop 1595–1597 Escutcheon: Argent, ten torteaux in pile, a label azure. Alternatively, with a label of five points gules.
	William Cotton, Bishop 1598–1621 Escutcheon: Argent, ten torteaux in pile, a label azure. Alternatively, no label, a label of five points, or a label azure.
	Valentine Cary, Bishop 1621–1626 Escutcheon: Argent, on a bend sable three roses of the field, a mullet for difference.
	Joseph Hall, Bishop 1627–1641 Escutcheon: Sable, three talbots' heads erased argent, langued gules.
	Ralph Brownrigg, Bishop 1642–1646 Escutcheon: Argent, a lion rampant sable guttee d'or between three crescents gules.
	John Gauden, Bishop 1660–1662 Escutcheon: Azure, a chevron ermine between three leopards' heads or; a bordure of the second.
	Seth Ward, Bishop 1662–1667 Escutcheon: Azure, a cross patonce or.
	Anthony Sparrow, Bishop 1667–1676 Escutcheon: Ermines, three roses argent.
	Thomas Lamplugh, Bishop 1676–1688 Escutcheon: Or, a cross flory sable.
	Sir Jonathan Trelawny, Bt., Bishop 1689–1707 Escutcheon: Argent, a chevron sable, a canton of Ulster.

=== Since the 18th century ===
Arms	Bishop and blazon
	Ofspring Blackall, Bishop 1708–1716 Escutcheon: Argent, a greyhound courant sable collared or, on a chief dancetty of the second, three bezants.
	Lancelot Blackburne, Bishop 1717–1724 Escutcheon: Argent, a fess nebuly between three mullets sable.
	Stephen Weston, Bishop 1724–1742 Escutcheon: Argent, a cross calvary gules; on a chief azure five bezants.
	Nicholas Clagett, Bishop 1742–1746 Escutcheon: Ermine, on a fess sable three pheons or.
	George Lavington, Bishop 1747–1762 Escutcheon: Argent, a saltire gules; on a chief of the second three boars' heads or; a crescent for difference.
	Frederick Keppel, Bishop 1762–1777 Escutcheon: Gules, three escallops argent; a martlet for difference.
	John Ross, Bishop 1778–1792 Escutcheon: Gules, three water bougets argent.
	William Buller, Bishop 1792–1796 Escutcheon: Sable, on a cross argent quarterly pierced four eagles displayed of the field.
	Reginald Courtenay, Bishop 1797–1803 Escutcheon: Or, three torteaux and a label azure, quartering Or, a lion rampant azure.
	John Fisher, Bishop 1803–1807 Escutcheon: Sable, on a mount vert two stags saliant affrontant argent, collared and chained or.
	George Pelham, Bishop 1807–1820 Escutcheon: Azure, three pelicans in piety argent; quartering, Gules, two demi-belts paleways, buckles towards chief.
	William Carey, Bishop 1820–1830 Escutcheon: Argent, on a bend sable three roses of the field, on a chief gules two crosses patée or. Alternatively blazoned with three crosses patée on the chief.
	Christopher Bethell, Bishop 1830 Escutcheon: Argent, on a chevron between three boars' heads sable, an estoile or.
	Henry Phillpotts, Bishop 1831–1869 Escutcheon: Gules, a cross between four swords erect argent, hilts and pommels or.
	Frederick Temple, Bishop 1869–1885 Escutcheon: Or, an eagle displayed sable (for Leofric, Earl of Mercia); quartering Argent, two bars sable, each charged with three martlets or (Temple).
	Edward Bickersteth, Bishop 1885–1900 Escutcheon: Argent, a cross flory sable charged with five mullets or; on a chief azure three roses or.
	Herbert Edward Ryle, Bishop 1901–1903 Escutcheon: Azure, on a bend erminois cotised argent between four crosses patée fitchy of the second, three cinquefoils argent.
	Archibald Robertson, Bishop 1903–1916 Escutcheon: Gules, on a chevron between three wolves' heads erased argent, three mullets of the field.
	Lord William Cecil, Bishop 1916–1936 Escutcheon: Quarterly : 1st and 4th, Barry of ten, argent and azure, over all, six escutcheons, sable, three, two, and one, each charged with a lion rampant, of the first ; a crescent for difference (Cecil), 2nd and 3rd, Argent, on a pale sable, a conger's head erased and erect or, charged with an ermine spot (Gascoigne).
	Charles Curzon, Bishop 1936–1948
	Robert Mortimer, Bishop 1949–1973 Escutcheon: Quarterly : 1st and 4th, Barry of six or and azure, on a chief of the flrst two pallets between two base gyrons of the second, over all an inescutcheon argent; 2nd and 3rd Or, ten fleurs de lys in pile azure, a chief of the second.
	Eric Mercer, Bishop 1973–1985
	Hewlett Thompson, Bishop 1985–1999.
	Michael Langrish, Bishop 1999–2013
	Robert Atwell, Bishop 2014–2023
	Mike Harrison, Bishop 2024–present
