= Huxley =

Huxley may refer to:

== People ==
- Huxley (surname)
- The British Huxley family
  - Thomas Henry Huxley (1825–1895), British biologist known as "Darwin's Bulldog"
  - Aldous Huxley (1894–1963), British writer, author of Brave New World, grandson of Thomas Huxley
  - Julian Huxley (1887–1975), British biologist, brother of Aldous Huxley
  - Andrew Huxley (1917–2012), British biologist, brother of Aldous Huxley
  - Anthony Huxley (1920–1992), British botanist, son of Julian Huxley
  - Francis Huxley (1923–2016), British botanist, anthropologist and author, son of Julian Huxley

== Geography ==
- Huxley, Alberta, Canada
- Huxley, Cheshire, England
- Huxley, Iowa, United States
- Huxley, Texas, United States
- Huxley River, New Zealand
- Mount Huxley (disambiguation)

== Education ==
- Huxley College of the Environment, a college of Western Washington University

== Other ==
- Huxley (lunar crater)
- Huxley (Martian crater)
- Huxley (video game), an MMOFPS by Webzen Games Inc.
- Huxley Pig, an animated television series
- Huxley, the third generation of 3D printers from the RepRap Project
- Huxley, the main antagonist in The Adventures of Elmo in Grouchland

== See also ==
- Huxley Stakes, a horse race run at Chester, England
