= John Douglas Sandford =

English cricketer, clergyman

Personal information
- Full name: John Douglas Sandford
- Born: 3 August 1832; Chillingham, Northumberland, England
- Died: 26 May 1892 (aged 59); Windsor, Berkshire, England
- Batting: Unknown
- Relatives: Ernest Sandford (brother); Temple Sandford (nephew)

Domestic team information
- Years: Team
- 1855–1856: Oxford University
- 1869: Marylebone Cricket Club

Career statistics
Competition	First-class
Matches	3
Runs scored	45
Batting average	9.00
100s/50s	–/–
Top score	20
Catches/stumpings	1/–
- Source: Cricinfo, 15 April 2020

John Douglas Sandford (3 August 1832 – 26 May 1892) was an English first-class cricketer and a judicial official in the Indian Civil Service.

== Biography ==
The son of future Archdeacon of Coventry John Sandford, he was born in August 1832 at Chillingham, Northumberland. He was educated at Rugby School, before going up to Trinity College, Oxford. While studying at Oxford, he made two appearances in first-class cricket for Oxford University against the Marylebone Cricket Club (MCC) in 1855 and 1856.

After graduating from Oxford, Sandford joined the Indian Civil Service in 1856, where he served in the North-Western Provinces and rose up the judicial system in British India to become the judicial commissioner of Burma and Mysore. He returned to England in 1868, where became a student of the Inner Temple at the age of 36, and was called to the bar in June 1870. The year following his return to England, and thirteen years after his previous appearance in first-class cricket, Sandford played a first-class match for the MCC against Oxford University at Oxford. After being called to the bar, he returned to British India where he practiced as a barrister until his departure in 1882. He retired two years later in 1884. Sandford died in May 1892 at Windsor, Berkshire.

Born into and ecclesiastical family, his younger brother, Ernest, was the Archdeacon of Exeter (in addition to being a first-class cricketer), and his elder brother, Charles, who was the Bishop of Gibraltar. His grandfather, Daniel Sandford, was the Bishop of Edinburgh. His nephew, Temple Sandford, was also a first-class cricketer.
