= John Sandford (Archdeacon of Coventry) =

19th-century Archdeacon of Coventry

John Sandford (1801 - 1873) was Archdeacon of Coventry from 1851 until his death.

== Life ==
Sandford was educated at Balliol College, Oxford; and was Rector of Alvechurch from 1854 until his death on 22 March 1873.

== Private life ==
He married the writer for women, Elizabeth Poole. Her books advised women to accept their domestic and secondary role to men. They had five sons including the eldest who was Henry Ryder Poole Sandford who was a school inspector. Henry married Margaret Sandford who led The Queen's School, Chester. John and Elizabeth's other sons included John, a cricketer and judicial official in British India, and Ernest and Charles, who were both senior Anglican clergy.

Church of England titles
Preceded by William Spooner	Archdeacon of Coventry; 1851–1873	Succeeded by Charles Holbech
