= John Moore-Stevens =

John Moore-Stevens may refer to:

- John Moore-Stevens (priest)
- John Moore-Stevens (MP)
