= Elizabeth Sandford =

British domestic moralist (1797/8–1853)

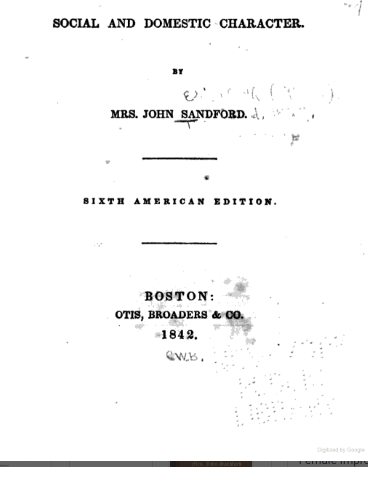
- 6th edition dated 1842 in the USA
- Born: 1797/8
- Died: 15 September 1853; Dunchurch
- Writing career
- Pen name: Mrs John Sandford
- Subject: advice for women
- Notable works: Woman in her Social and Domestic Character

Elizabeth Sandford, born Elizabeth Gabriel Poole, who wrote as Mrs John Sandford (1797/8 – 15 September 1853) was a British domestic moralist. She wrote advice books for women to help them with their domestic and secondary role to men.

== Life ==
Sandford was born in 1797 or 1798, her father was Richard J. Poole of Sherbourne and she comes to notice when she published her first book in 1831 under the name of "Mrs John Sandford". The book was titled Woman in her Social and Domestic Character and it was specifically aimed at women readers. The book sold well.

She had married John Sandford the recently ordained chaplain to the marquess of Queensberry on 23 August 1825 at Wells in Somerset. Her new husband was her second cousin, and her sister Ethel Maria Ruscombe Poole married Henry Poole's brother, Ernest Grey Sandford.

Elizabeth Sandford became a notable author of tracts on domestic morality. Her husband became the to vicarage of Chillingham in Northumberland in 1827, the chaplain of Long Acre, London, and the rector of Dunchurch in 1836.

Sandford's books advised women to accept their domestic and secondary role to men.

Their daughter Margaret became a writer and she married Henry Ryder Poole Sandford.

== Death and legacy ==
Sandford died in Dunchurch in 1853 the year that her husband took on the Grimley with Hallow (1853). He held the rectory of Alvechurch near Bromsgrove from 1854 until his death and in time became the archdeacon of Coventry. He married again in 1856. Her daughter, Margaret Sandford, in time, became the head of The Queen's School in Chester.

Sandford's approach to the role of women was continued by the writings of Sarah Stickney Ellis who opened a school based on her ideas.
