= Penny Driver =

Penelope May "Penny" Driver (born 20 February 1952) is an Anglican priest.

Driver was educated at Manchester University and ordained deacon in 1987 and priest in 1994. She began her ordained ministry as a curate in Cullercoats and the Newcastle Diocesan Youth Advisor. After this, she was Youth Chaplain for the Diocese of Ripon from 1988 to 1996 and then its Assistant Director of Ordinands from 1996 to 1998; and director from then until 2006, when she became Archdeacon of Exeter. In 2011, she was appointed Archdeacon of Westmorland and Furness. She retired in late 2016.

Church of England titles
Preceded by Paul Gardner	Archdeacon of Exeter; 2006–2011	Succeeded by Christopher Futcher
Preceded by George Howe	Archdeacon of Westmorland and Furness; 2011–2016	Succeeded by Vernon Ross archdeacon-designate
