= Andrew Beane =

British Anglican priest

Andrew Mark Beane (born 9 November 1972) has been Archdeacon of Exeter since September 2019.

Beane was educated at St John's College, Nottingham and ordained in 2003. After a curacy at Thorpe St Andrew he held incumbencies at Horsham St Faith and then Aylsham until his appointment as Archdeacon.

Church of England titles
| Preceded by Christopher Futcher | Archdeacon of Exeter; 2019– | Succeeded by Incumbent |
