= Justice Patterson =

Justice Patterson may refer to:

- Anne M. Patterson (born 1959), associate justice of the New Jersey Supreme Court
- Frances Patterson (1954–2016), justice of the High Court of England
- Neville Patterson (1916–1987), associate justice and chief justice of the Supreme Court of Mississippi

== See also ==
- William Paterson (judge) (1745–1806), associate justice of the United States Supreme Court
- John M. Patterson (1921–2021), chief justice of a "Special Supreme Court" that tried the case of Alabama Chief Justice Roy Moore
- Judge Patterson (disambiguation)
