= Temple Sandford =

English cricketer

Personal information
- Full name: Temple Charles Gabriel Sandford
- Born: 16 May 1877; Landkey, Devon, England
- Died: 27 December 1942 (aged 65); Marlborough, Wiltshire, England
- Batting: Right-handed
- Bowling: Wicket-keeper
- Relatives: Ernest Sandford (father); John Sandford (uncle)

Domestic team information
- Years: Team
- 1908–1931: Wiltshire
- 1901–1904: Devon
- 1900: Oxford University

Career statistics
| Competition | First-class |
|---|---|
| Matches | 2 |
| Runs scored | 19 |
| Batting average | 6.33 |
| 100s/50s | –/– |
| Top score | 11 |
| Catches/stumpings | 1/– |
- Source: Cricinfo, 9 February 2011

Temple Charles Gabriel Sandford (16 May 1877 – 27 December 1942) was an English cricketer. Sandford was a right-handed batsman and a wicket-keeper. He was born in Landkey, Devon and was the son of Ernest Sandford who played first-class cricket for Oxford University and the Gentlemen.

Sandford was named after Frederick Temple, Bishop of Exeter at the time of Sandford's birth and later Archbishop of Canterbury. He was generally known as "Sandy". He was educated at Marlborough College and at Keble College, Oxford where in addition to playing cricket he won a Blue for field hockey in two seasons.

In 1900, he played two first-class matches for Oxford University against Worcestershire and Surrey. In his two first-class matches he scored 19 runs at a batting average of 6.33, with a high score of 11. In the field he took a single catch. In 1901, he played in Devon's inaugural Minor Counties Championship season, making his debut against Wiltshire. Sandford captained Devon on occasions and represented the county from 1901 to 1904. In 1908, he joined Wiltshire, making his debut for the county against the Surrey Second XI. He played Minor counties cricket for Wiltshire from 1908 to 1931, playing his final match against Berkshire. Though he kept wicket early in his career, later on he became a slow bowler; he was described as a "punishing" batsman.

Sandford became a schoolmaster at Marlborough College where he had been educated himself and was a housemaster there for 30 years, and in charge of rugby, hockey and cricket. He retired from teaching in 1937 but resumed again at the start of the Second World War and was still a schoolmaster when he died in Marlborough, Wiltshire on 27 December 1942.
