= Huxley Thompson =

Arthur Huxley Thompson (8 July 1872 – 17 April 1951) was a Church of England priest and author, most notably archdeacon of Exeter from 1930 until his death.

Thompson was educated at Malvern and Jesus College, Oxford and ordained in 1898. After curacies at Ashburton and Wolborough he held incumbencies in Ide and Exeter. He was a canon residentiary of Exeter Cathedral from 1930; and treasurer from 1939.

Church of England titles
Preceded by William Frederick Surtees	Archdeacon of Exeter; 1930–1951	Succeeded by Wilfrid Arthur Edmund Westall
