= Governor Harper =

Governor Harper may refer to:

- Charles Harper (colonial administrator) (1876–1950), Governor of St. Helena from 1925 to 1932
- Joseph M. Harper (1787–1865), Acting Governor of New Hampshire in 1831
