= Frederick Sanders =

Frederick Arthur Sanders (1856-1930) was a Church of England priest, most notably Archdeacon of Exeter from 1909 until 1924.

Sanders was born in Exeter; educated at Marlborough and Keble College, Oxford; and ordained in 1879. After a curacies in Lichfield and Buckland Monachorum he held incumbencies at Brixton and Woodleigh.

He died on 14 August 1930.

Church of England titles
Preceded by Ernest GreySandford	Archdeacon of Exeter; 1909–1924	Succeeded by William Frederick Surtees
