= David Huxley =

David Huxley may refer to:

- David Bruce Huxley (1915–1992), English financier and lawyer
- David Huxley, Australian ice hockey player, captain of Adelaide Adrenaline
- David Huxley, Cary Grant's character in the 1938 film Bringing Up Baby
- David Huxley, a character in 8mm 2

== See also ==
- Huxley (surname)
