= Tony Tremlett (archdeacon) =

Archdeacon of Totnes (1937–2016)

Anthony Frank Tremlett (25 August 1937 – September 2016) was an Anglican archdeacon.

Tremlett was educated at Plymouth College and had a career on the railways until he was ordained in 1982. He was successively curate, priest in charge and Vicar of Southway. He became Archdeacon of Totnes in 1988 and Archdeacon of Exeter in 1994.

One of his sons, Andrew, is also a senior Church of England priest.

Tremlett died in Derriford Hospital, Plymouth, in September 2016.

Church of England titles
Preceded by Richard Hawkins	Archdeacon of Totnes; 1988–1994	Succeeded by Richard Gilpin
Preceded by John Richards	Archdeacon of Exeter; 1994–2002	Succeeded by Paul Gardner
