= Darell Trelawny =

Darell Trelawny or Trelawney (c. 1695–1727), of Coldrenick, near Liskeard, Cornwall, was a British politician who sat in the House of Commons briefly in 1727.

Trelawny was the eldest son of Edward Trelawney of Coldrenick, Dean of Exeter, and his wife Elizabeth Darell, daughter of Thomas Darell of Chawcroft, Hampshire. He was a descendant of Sir Jonathan Trelawny, MP of Trelawne (died 1604). He matriculated at Christ Church, Oxford on 26 March 1713, aged 17.

At the 1722 British general election, Trelawny stood unsuccessfully at Callington and Truro. He was also defeated at a by-election at Lostwithiel in January 1727. However, he was returned as Member of Parliament for Lostwithiel by the Administration at the 1727 British general election.

Trelawny had succeeded his father to Coldrenick in 1726. He suffered ill-health and set out for Lisbon via Falmouth for recovery, shortly after his election, but died unmarried on the way on 14 October 1727. He left his estates to his brother Charles, and was determined that if his brother died, they should go to his maternal relatives, the Darells, and under no circumstances to his cousins, the Trelawnys of Trelawne who had treated him with disregard.

Parliament of Great Britain
| Preceded by Sir Orlando Bridgeman; Hon. Sir William Stanhope | Member of Parliament for Lostwithiel; 1727–Oct 1727; With: Sir Orlando Bridgeman | Succeeded by Anthony Cracherode; Sir Edward Knatchbull |
