= Paul Gardner (priest) =

British priest

Paul (Douglas) Gardner (born 28 May 1950) is a Christian priest and author.

Gardner was educated at Leeds Grammar School, King's College London and Ridley Hall, Cambridge. He was ordained deacon in 1980, and priest in 1981.; After a curacy at, St Martin, Cambridge he was a Lecturer at Oak Hill Theological College. He was vicar of St John the Baptist, Hartford, Cheshire from 1990 to 2003; archdeacon of Exeter from 2003 to 2005 and senior minister of Christ Church Presbyterian Church, Atlanta, Georgia from 2005 to 2017.

Church of England titles
Preceded by Anthony Frank Tremlett	Archdeacon of Exeter; 2003–2005	Succeeded by Penelope May Driver
