= Judge Patterson =

Judge Patterson may refer to:

- Lester W. Patterson (1893–1947), county court judge from Bronx County New York
- Robert P. Patterson (1891–1952), judge of the United States Court of Appeals for the Second Circuit
- Robert P. Patterson Jr. (1923–2015), judge of the United States District Court for the Southern District of New York

== See also ==
- Justice Patterson (disambiguation)
