= Peter Coleman (bishop) =

Bishop of Crediton

Peter Everard Coleman AKC (28 August 1928–27 December 2001) was Bishop of Crediton from 1984 to 1996.

Coleman was educated at the Haileybury and Imperial Service College and King's College London before becoming its chaplain until 1966. He married Princess Elisabeth-Donata Reuss of Köstritz (Donata; 8 June 1932 - 24 April 2022) in 1960. They had two sons and two daughters. Following this he was vicar of St Paul's Clifton, then Director of Ordinands in the Diocese of Bristol and finally (before his ordination to the episcopate) Archdeacon of Worcester. In retirement he ministered in the Diocese of Bath and Wells as an assistant bishop until his death.

Church of England titles
Preceded by Philip Pasterfield	Bishop of Crediton; 1984–1996	Succeeded by Richard Hawkins
