= Daniel Estcott =

Anglican clergyman

The Venerable Daniel Estcot (24 October 1627 – 28 March 1668) was an Anglican clergyman.

He was educated at Wadham College, Oxford. He became a Fellow of Wadham in 1651. The Rector of Barrow in 1691. He held the living at Dunchideock He became a Canon of Exeter Cathedral in 1663 and Archdeacon of Exeter in 1665, holding both positions until his death. He is buried in Exeter Cathedral.
