= Arthur Graeme West =

Arthur Graeme West (September, 1891 – 3 April 1917) was a British writer and war poet. West was born in Eaton, Norfolk, educated at Highgate School, then Blundell's School and Balliol College, Oxford, and killed by a sniper in 1917.

== Military service ==
West enlisted as a Private with the Public Schools Battalion in January 1915. He joined from a feeling of duty and patriotism, but the war had a profound effect on him. An individualist who hated routine and distrusted discipline, he developed an intense abhorrence to army life and began to question the very core of his beliefs – in religion, patriotism and the reason for war. This growing disillusionment found expression in two particularly powerful war poems he wrote during this time: "God, How I Hate You" and "Night Patrol". In his diary he describes reading Bertrand Russell's writings on pacifism, which made a great impression on him. In August 1916 he became a second lieutenant in the Oxfordshire and Buckinghamshire Light Infantry. Shortly after, he wrote to his new battalion threatening to desert the army - but he could not bring himself to post the letter. Less than a year later, on 3 April 1917, he was shot dead by a sniper's bullet near Bapaume.

== Writing ==
West is principally known for one book, The Diary of a Dead Officer (1919), which presents a scathing picture of army life and a vivid account of daily life in the trenches. The book was published posthumously and edited by C. E. M. Joad, an Oxford colleague of West's and an active pacifist (and contemporary of West's at Blundell's). It was reissued in 1991 by the Imperial War Museum and published again by Greenhill Books in 2007 with an introduction by Nigel Jones. The first edition of the book consisted of an introduction by Joad, extracts from West's 1915-17 diary, and several essays and poems. Joad edited the book as pacifist propaganda and it was published jointly by the left-wing Herald newspaper and Sir Francis Meynell's Pelican Press (Meynell's other publications had included Sassoon's protest in 1917). Jones' edition does not include Joad's introduction.

== Bibliography ==
- Santanu Das (2005). Touch and Intimacy in First World War Literature. Cambridge: Cambridge University Press. ISBN 978-0-521-84603-5
- Cyril Joad (2007), The Diary of a Dead Officer: Being the Posthumous Papers of Arthur Graeme West (Greenhill Books), ISBN 1-85367-729-9; ISBN 978-1-85367-729-8
- Dennis Welland, Arthur Graeme West: a messenger to Job, Renaissance and Modern Studies, ed. G.R. Hibberd (1966).
- Samuel Hynes, An introduction to Graeme West, English Literature of the First World War Revisited [Series], ed. M. Roucoux (Amiens, 1989).
