= Sarah Stickney Ellis =

English author (1799–1872)

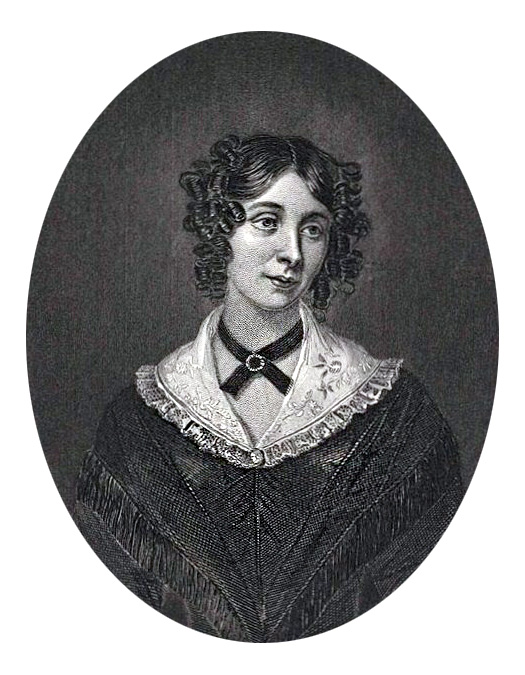
- Sarah Stickney Ellis as depicted in her book The Wives of England
- Born: Sarah Stickney; 1799, 1810
- Died: 16 June 1872
- Occupations: Writer, editor
- Spouse: William Ellis

Sarah Stickney Ellis, born Sarah Stickney (1799 – 16 June 1872), also known as Sarah Ellis, was an English author.^{[1]} She was a Quaker turned Congregationalist. Her numerous books are mostly about women's roles in society. She argued that women had a religious duty as daughters, wives and mothers to provide an influence for good that would improve society.

== Early life ==
Sarah Stickney had been brought up as a Quaker, but latterly chose to be an Independent or Congregationalist, as did many of those involved in the London Missionary Society. She shared her future husband's love of books and of writing. Already a published writer (Pictures of Private Life and The Poetry of Life), she was also a contributor to The Christian Keepsake and Missionary Annual edited by the widower Rev William Ellis. She and Ellis met at the home of a mutual friend, who held prominent positions in the London Missionary Society, and with whom she worked for the missionary cause and to promote their common interest in temperance.

The couple married on 23 May 1837 but were unable to take a honeymoon, as William's eldest daughter Mary was ill. She died in June and was buried in the London burial ground of Bunhill Fields, next to her mother. William Ellis had started to become a successful writer on the topography, history, botany, and ethnography of Polynesia, since returning from the South Seas. Sarah Ellis gained her own success, primarily with books on women's roles in society.

== Conduct books ==
Well-known works of Sarah Ellis are The Wives of England (1843), The Women of England, The Mothers of England, The Daughters of England, and some more directly educational works such as Rawdon House and Education of the Heart: Women's Best Work. Related to her principal literary theme of moral education for women, she established Rawdon House in Hertfordshire, a school for young ladies intended to apply the principles illustrated in her books to the "moral training, the formation of character, and in some degree the domestic duties of young ladies." Unusually for the time, the school was non-denominational and included cookery and house management in the curriculum.

With few exceptions, boys and girls were educated separately in 19th-century England, and the question of how to educate women was a subject of debate. It was common for women, as well as men, to believe that the former should not be educated in the full range of subjects, but should focus on domestic skills. Elizabeth Sandford wrote for women in support of this view, whilst others such as Susanna Corder ran a novel Quaker girls' school at Abney Park, instituted by the philanthropist William Allen, which dissented from convention by teaching all the latest sciences as early as the 1820s. In Education of the Heart: Women's Best Work (1869), Sarah Ellis accepted the importance of intellectual education for women alongside training in domestic duties but stressed that since women were the earliest educators of the men who predominantly ran and decided upon education in Victorian society, women primarily needed a system of education that developed sound moral character in their offspring.

Ellis aimed much of her prescriptive writing in the 1840s and 1850s at the expanding lower middle class in the suburbs. Her readers were women who might be the first in their family to employ a domestic servant, striving to adapt to an exclusively domestic role. Understandably, historians have focused on Ellis's education of these women in domestic duties, along with appropriate submission to their husbands: in the famous phrase, to "suffer and be still."

After visiting The Great Exhibition, Ellis wrote about its impression on her in, ‘The Exhibition. Letter from a Country Visitor to her Friend in the North’, Morning Call (1851).

However, there was another side to her writing. She insisted that women should remain single if they could not find a "reasonable" husband. She was conscious of the widespread incidence of marital disharmony in middle-class marriages as women struggled to submit to husbands whom Ellis calls, ambiguously, "the lords of creation", and she wrote of the need for wives to "humor" or manipulate their husbands in their own interests and in the interests of marital harmony. In private correspondence, she spoke of tensions in her own marriage with William Ellis and of friends who had left their husbands.

== Aesthetics ==
Ellis also wrote about art and aesthetics. This included the 1835 book The Poetry of Life and the 1866 book The Beautiful in Nature and Art. She defined aesthetics as "the science which treats of the perception of the beautiful in nature, in art, and in literature". She gave an account of natural beauty and argued that art could be beautiful if it was based on close observation of natural beauty and drew out the ideal character of naturally beautiful objects. She discussed symbolism and the historical development of art, praising ancient Egyptian art which, she says, was the true beginning of art.

Her book The Beautiful in Nature and Art was reissued in an 8-volume series of works in nineteenth-century British aesthetics edited by John Vladimir Price.

== Later life ==
After 35 years of marriage, the Ellises died within a week of each other in June 1872. She was buried in the Quaker Burial ground at Hoddesdon, Hertfordshire near their home, returning to her Quaker roots, whilst her husband was laid to rest in the Congregationalists' non-denominational Abney Park Cemetery on the outskirts of Victorian London.

== Selected works ==
- Rawdon House
- The Beautiful in Nature & Art
- The Family Monitor
- Northern Roses
- Education of the Heart: Women's Best Work
- The Wives of England
- The Women of England
- The Mothers of England
- The Daughters of England
- A Summer and Winter in the Pyrenees
- Social Distinctions; or Hearts and Homes (1848–1849)
- Look to the End; or, The Bennets Abroad (1845)
