= Richard Shore (cricketer) =

English cricketer

Personal information
- Full name: Richard Graham Shore
- Born: 9 March 1941 (age 85); Winton, Hampshire, England
- Batting: Right-handed
- Bowling: Right-arm medium

Domestic team information
- Years: Team
- 1962: Oxford University

Career statistics
Competition	First-class
Matches	4
Runs scored	46
Batting average	7.66
100s/50s	–/–
Top score	24
Balls bowled	756
Wickets	10
Bowling average	39.50
5 wickets in innings	–
10 wickets in match	–
Best bowling	3/57
Catches/stumpings	1/–
- Source: Cricinfo, 16 April 2020

Richard Graham Shore (born 9 March 1941) is an English former first-class cricketer and British Army officer.

Shore was born in March 1941 at Winton, Hampshire. He was educated at Blundell's School, before going up to Brasenose College, Oxford. While studying at Oxford, he made four appearances in first-class cricket for Oxford University in 1962. He scored 47 runs in his four matches, with a high score of 24, while with his right-arm medium pace bowling, he took 10 wickets at an average of 39.50 and best figures of 3 for 57.

After graduating from Oxford, Shore joined the British Army and was commissioned as a second lieutenant on probation with the Devonshire and Dorset Regiment in October 1967. He was confirmed in the rank coming in March 1968, with promotion to lieutenant following in February 1970. In December of the same year, he was promoted to captain. He was promoted to major in December 1974, before being promoted to lieutenant colonel in June 1982. Shore retired from active service in September 1993, at which point he was appointed to the Reserve of Officers.
