= Archdeacon of Exeter =

Church of England ecclesiastical office

The Archdeacon of Exeter is a senior ecclesiastical officer of the Diocese of Exeter in the Church of England. The modern diocese is divided into four archdeaconries: the archdeacon of Exeter supervises clergy and buildings within the area of the Archdeaconry of Exeter.

== History ==
The first recorded archdeacon of Exeter occurs in 1083, around the time when archdeacons were first appointed in Britain. Around that time, the Diocese of Exeter was divided into four archdeaconries: Exeter, Cornwall, Totnes (or Totton) and Barnstaple (or Barum). This configuration of archdeaconries within the diocese remained for almost 800 years, until the creation of the independent Diocese of Truro from the Cornwall archdeaconry. On 22 March 1918, the archdeaconries were reconfigured and the Archdeaconry of Plymouth created from Totnes archdeaconry. Presently, the diocese operates an informal 'area scheme' such that responsibility for roughly half the diocese is delegated to each suffragan bishop: special oversight is given to the Bishop of Crediton for the Barnstaple and Exeter archdeaconries and to the Bishop of Plymouth for the Plymouth and Totnes archdeaconries.

== List of archdeacons ==
=== High medieval ===
Sole (or primary) archdeacons of the diocese

- ?–28 June 1083 (d.): Odo
- ?–11 March 1104 (d.): Rolamnus
- aft. 1103–11 August 1107 (res.): William Warelwast

During (or possibly before) the episcopacy of William Warelwast (1107–1137), the other three archdeaconries were instituted.

Archdeacons of Exeter

- Ernaldus (died 14 March 1136)
- bef. 1113–18 December 1138 (res.): Robert Warelwast
- bef. 1143–aft. 1143: Walter de Constantiis
- 1162 - 1188: Henry Fitzharding
- ?–17 February 1155 (d.): Ralph
- 1155–1161 (res.): Bartholomew Iscanus

Baldwin of Forde, Archdeacon of Totnes was said in 1165 to have held this post.

- bef. 1205–1221 (d.): Henry Fitz Robert de Molesiis/de Melvile
- ?–December 1225 (res.): Serlo
- aft. 1225–bef. 1236: Bonus
- bef. 1236–21 September 1247 (d.): Bartholomew
- bef. 1269–1269 (res.): Roger de Thoriz
- 3 September 1270 – 1274 (res.): John Norilis/Norle
- 22 December 1274 – 1282 (res.): John of Pontoise
- bef. 1284–aft. 1287: Robert de Evesham
- bef. 1290–aft. 1292: Peter de Insula (later Archdeacon of Wells)
- bef. 1295–bef. 1311: Bartholomew de Sancto Laurentio (also Archdeacon of Barnstaple; Dean of Exeter from 1310)

=== Late medieval ===
- 10 March 1308–? (deprived): Richard de Plumstok/de Plumpstock (unsuccessful royal grant)
- 20 June 1311–bef. 1312 (d.): William FitzRogo
- 5 March 1312 – 1317 (res.): John Wele
- 16 August 1317 – 2 February 1318 (deprived): Richard de Coleton (collation reversed)
- 2 February 1318–bef. 1318 (d.): Richard de Morcester
- 11 June 1318–bef. 1329 (d.): Thomas de Hereward
- 29 November 1329 – 1330 (res.): John de Northwode
- 18 April–5 July 1330 (d.): William de Grandisson/Grandison
- 12 July 1330 – June 1331 (exch.): William Zouche
- June 1331–bef. 1345 (res.): Thomas de Nassington
- 15 December 1345–bef. 1360 (d.): Otto/Otho de Northwode
- 16 November–27 December 1360 (res.): Philip de Beauchamp/de Bello Campo (underage)
- 27 December 1360 – 1361 (res.): Stephen de Pempel/de Penpel/de Pympel
- 1361–1371 (d.): Philip de Beauchamp (again)
- 20 August 1371 – 1 March 1375 (deprived): Thomas de Swaby/Swaby (royal grant; revoked)
- 1 March 1371 – 1378 (deprived): Peter Cardinal de Vernhio (Peter de Everino; cardinal-deacon of Santa Maria in Via Lata)
- 10 July 1379–aft. 1379: John Cheyne
- bef. 1384–16 August 1397 (d.): Philip Cardinal de Alencon (Philippe Valois d'Alençon, cardinal-bishop of Sabina)
- 8 November 1397–bef. 1399: William Waltham
- 9 April 1399–bef. 1399 (res.): Nicholas Bubwith
- 21 October 1399 – 1403 (res.): Walter Cook
- 11 June 1403 – 31 May 1408 (d.): Angelo Cardinal Acciaioli (Cardinal-bishop of Ostia)
- 7 December 1408 – 28 February 1410 (exch.): William Pilton/Thomas Pylton
- c. 1408–14 July 1410 (res.): Anthony Cardinal de Calvis (Antonio Calvi, cardinal-priest of San Marco; unsuccessful papal grant)
- 28 February 1410 – 1417 (res.): Thomas Hendeman
- 25 January–May 1417 (res.): Roger Bolter
- 21 September 1417–bef. 1425 (d.): John Schute
- 1418: Thomas Redman (ineffective exchange)
- 27 September 1425–bef. 1438 (d.): James Carslegh
- 5 December 1438–bef. 1444 (res.): Peter Stukeley/Stukelegh
- 21 March 1444 – 1453 (d.): John Druell
- 8 June 1453 – 7 January 1475 (exch.): Peter Courtenay
- 7 January 1475 – 23 October 1482 (d.): Robert Aiscough/Ayscogh
- aft. 1482–1492 (d.): David Hopton
- 3 February 1492–c. 1493 (res.): Richard Nykke
- bef. 1504 – November 1504 (res.): Hugh Oldham
- 13 January 1505 – 1515 (res.): Richard More
- 19 June 1515–bef. 1519 (d.): John Fulford
- 19 January 1519 – 27 December 1555 (d.): Adam Travesse

=== Early modern ===
- 1551–?: Rowland Taylor (burned at the stake, 1555)
- 30 January 1556–bef. 1569 (res.): George Carew
- 20 October 1569–bef. 1583 (d.): Robert Fisher/Fysher
- 14 January 1583 – 25 November 1633 (d.): Thomas Barrett
- 16 January 1634–bef. 1643 (d.): Aaron Wilson
- 21 September 1643–bef. 1662 (res.): Edward Young
- 18 August 1662–bef. 1665 (res.): Robert Cary
- 4 February 1665 – 28 March 1668 (d.): Daniel Estcott
- 28 March 1668 – September 1676 (res.): Anthony Sparrow, Bishop of Exeter
- 24 October 1676 – 1 February 1704 (d.): Edward Lake
- 1 April 1704 – 1707 (res.): Jonathan Trelawny, Bishop of Exeter
- 7 February 1708 – 29 November 1716 (d.): Ofspring Blackall, Bishop of Exeter
- 1 March 1717 – 21 October 1726 (d.): Edward Trelawney
- 11 November 1726–bef. 1732: Richard Ibbetson
- 26 January 1732 – 1820: successive Bishops of Exeter held the archdeaconry for this period
- 29 December 1820 – 1865 (d.): John Moore-Stevens (Moore-Stevens after July 1832)

=== Late modern ===
- April 1865 – February 1875 (d.): Philip Freeman
- February 1875 – 1888 (d.): Henry Sanders
- 1888–1909 (ret.): Ernest Sandford
- 1909–1924 (ret.): Frederick Sanders
- 1925–1930 (res.): William Surtees
- 1930–17 April 1951 (d.): Huxley Thompson
- 1951–1958 (res.): Wilfrid Westall (also Bishop suffragan of Crediton from 1954)
- 1958–1970 (ret.): Richard Babington (afterwards archdeacon emeritus)
- 1981–1994 (res.): John Richards
- 1994–2002 (ret.): Tony Tremlett
- 2003–2005 (res.): Paul Gardner
- 2006–2012 (res.): Penny Driver
- 28 April 2012 – 7 September 2019 (res.): Christopher Futcher (became Archdeacon in Cyprus)
- 25 September 2019 – present: Andrew Beane

== Sources ==
- Le Neve, John; Hardy, Sir Thomas Duffus (1854). Archdeacons of Exeter . Fasti ecclesiae Anglicanae. Vol. 1. Oxford: Oxford University Press. pp. 392–397 – via Wikisource.
- Horn, Joyce M. (1964), Fasti Ecclesiae Anglicanae 1300–1541, vol. 9, pp. 12–15
