= Margaret Sandford =

English headmistress and author (1839–1903)

- Born: Margaret Poole; 20 March 1839; Bridgwater, England
- Died: 1903 (aged 63–64)

Margaret Elizabeth Sandford born Margaret Elizabeth Poole (20 March 1839 – 1903) was an English headmistress and author. She was an anti-suffragist who led The Queen's School, Chester from 1886.

== Life ==
Sandford was born in Bridgwater in 1839. Her parents were Maria (born Westmacott) and Gabriel Stone Poole who was a solicitor. Her education is not known but by 1867 her writing was published in a magazine and by 1870 she had her first book published which was titled Pictures of Cottage Life in the West of England.

She married Henry Ryder Poole Sandford. Her parents-in-law were Elizabeth Sandford whose books advised women to accept their domestic and secondary role to men and her father-in-law, John Sandford, was the Archdeacon of Coventry. Her new husband was her second cousin, and her sister Ethel Maria Ruscombe Poole married her husband's brother Ernest Grey Sandford.

Her husband died 1883 and she was considered as a candidate to Girton College's mistress but she took the position of assistant mistress at the Girls' Public Day School Company's Sheffield high school. Sandford taught divinity, history, and literature there until 1886 when she became the head of The Queen's School in Chester. She extended the curriculum including languages, mathematics, chemistry, gymnastics, and she introduced a novel approach to art developed by Robert Aplett in Bradford.

Sandford was open to women being involved in the administration of education but she was opposed to women gaining the right to vote. In 1895 she had a public debate with the suffragist leader Millicent Fawcett on the question of women having the vote. She was the head of the school until she died in 1903.
