= William Warelwast =

11th-century Norman bishop of Exeter

- Bishop of Exeter
- Elected: 11 August 1107
- Term ended: c. 26 September 1137
- Predecessor: Osbern FitzOsbern
- Successor: Robert Warelwast
- Other post: Archdeacon of Exeter

Orders
- Consecration: 11 August 1107 by Anselm

Personal details
- Died: c. 26 September 1137

William Warelwast (Note: Sometimes known as William de Warelwast.) (died 1137) was a medieval Norman cleric and Bishop of Exeter in England. Warelwast was a native of Normandy, (Note: His name originates probably from Véraval (Warelwast 1024), now sometimes misspelled Ver-à-Val, a hamlet of Autretot, which is about 3.1 mi (5.0 km) to the northwest of Yvetot in Normandy, now in the region Normandy in France.) but little is known about his background before 1087, when he appears as a royal clerk for King William II. Most of his royal service to William was as a diplomatic envoy, as he was heavily involved in the king's dispute with Anselm, the Archbishop of Canterbury, which constituted the English theatre of the Investiture Controversy. He went several times to Rome as an emissary to the papacy on business related to Anselm, one of whose supporters, the medieval chronicler Eadmer, alleged that Warelwast bribed the pope and the papal officials to secure favourable outcomes for King William.

Possibly present at King William's death in a hunting accident, Warelwast served as a diplomat to the king's successor, Henry I. After the resolution of the Investiture Controversy, Warelwast was rewarded with the bishopric of Exeter in Devon, but he continued to serve Henry as a diplomat and royal judge. He began the construction of a new cathedral at Exeter, and he probably divided the diocese into archdeaconries. Warelwast went blind after 1120, and after his death in 1137, was succeeded by his nephew, Robert Warelwast.

== Early life ==
Little is known of Warelwast's background or family before 1087. Later in life he was involved in founding Augustinian houses of canons, which – according to historian D. W. Blake – implies that he was an Augustinian canon or spent some of his early years in a house of such canons. Several medieval chroniclers hostile to Warelwast, including Eadmer, claim that he was illiterate, but his career suggests otherwise, as it involved the extensive use of written documents. He must also have been an accomplished speaker, given the number of times he was used as a diplomat. He was possibly educated at Laon, where later in life he sent his nephew, Robert Warelwast, to school. Another nephew, William, became the bishop's steward.

Warelwast may have been a clerk for King William I of England, as a confirmation charter from the time of King Stephen (reigned 1135–1154) records that a grant of churches in Exeter was given to Warelwast by "Willelmus, avus meus", or "William, my grandfather/ancestor"; Stephen was a grandson of William I, who reigned 1066–1087. But this charter may be a forgery, or the Willelmus referred to may have been William II rather than William I. The charter itself is insufficient evidence to confidently assert that Warelwast served William I, even though most such grants were made as a reward for royal service. It may have been that Warelwast was awarded land by William I not because he was a royal servant but because he was a relative; certainly, the late-medieval writer William Worcester claimed that Warelwast was related to the king.

== Royal clerk under King William II ==
The first reliable mentions of Warelwast occur early in the reign of King William II, when Warelwast appears as authorizing writs for the king. As well as being a royal clerk, Warelwast acted as a judge in a legal case between St Florent Abbey in Saumur and Fécamp Abbey, heard before King William II some time between 1094 and 1099 at Foucarmont.

Warelwast served as the king's envoy to Pope Urban II in 1095, when the king sought to have the newly appointed Archbishop of Canterbury, Anselm of Canterbury, removed from office. He visited the pope with another royal clerk, Gerard, with orders to recognize Urban as pope in return for Anselm's deposition, at least according to Eadmer, an Anselm partisan. The two clerks travelled very quickly, as they did not leave before 28 February 1095 and were back in England by 13 May 1095. Eadmer claimed that the ambassadors were supposed to acquire a pallium, the symbol of an archbishop's authority, for the king to give to his new choice as archbishop. But although the king may have instructed his envoys to attempt to secure these objects, he was probably willing to negotiate and to settle for less. The two clerks returned with a papal legate, Walter of Albano, who accepted the king's recognition of Urban but refused to allow Anselm's deposition. The king did nevertheless manage to secure recognition of his royal rights in the church, and a concession that no papal legates or communications would be sent without his approval. It may well be that the king always regarded Anselm's deposition as unlikely.

Warelwast was probably sent as an envoy to Urban in 1096 to bribe the pope into recalling the papal legate Jarento, who had been sent to England to protest the king's conduct towards the church. In addition to his ambassadorial duties, Warelwast acted as a royal justice under King William; the records of one case have survived.

Shortly before Anselm went into exile in 1097, Warelwast searched his baggage, probably looking for communications to the pope, either from Anselm or other English bishops, rather than for valuables, and in particular for any letters of complaint. Warelwast was the king's envoy at Rome when during his exile Anselm petitioned to have the king excommunicated, which according to Eadmer, who was also present, Warelwast succeeded in preventing by bribing the pope and papal officials. The king had sent Warelwast to Urban at Christmas 1098, with his reply to a letter the pope had written ordering the restoration of Anselm's estates.

== Royal service for King Henry I ==
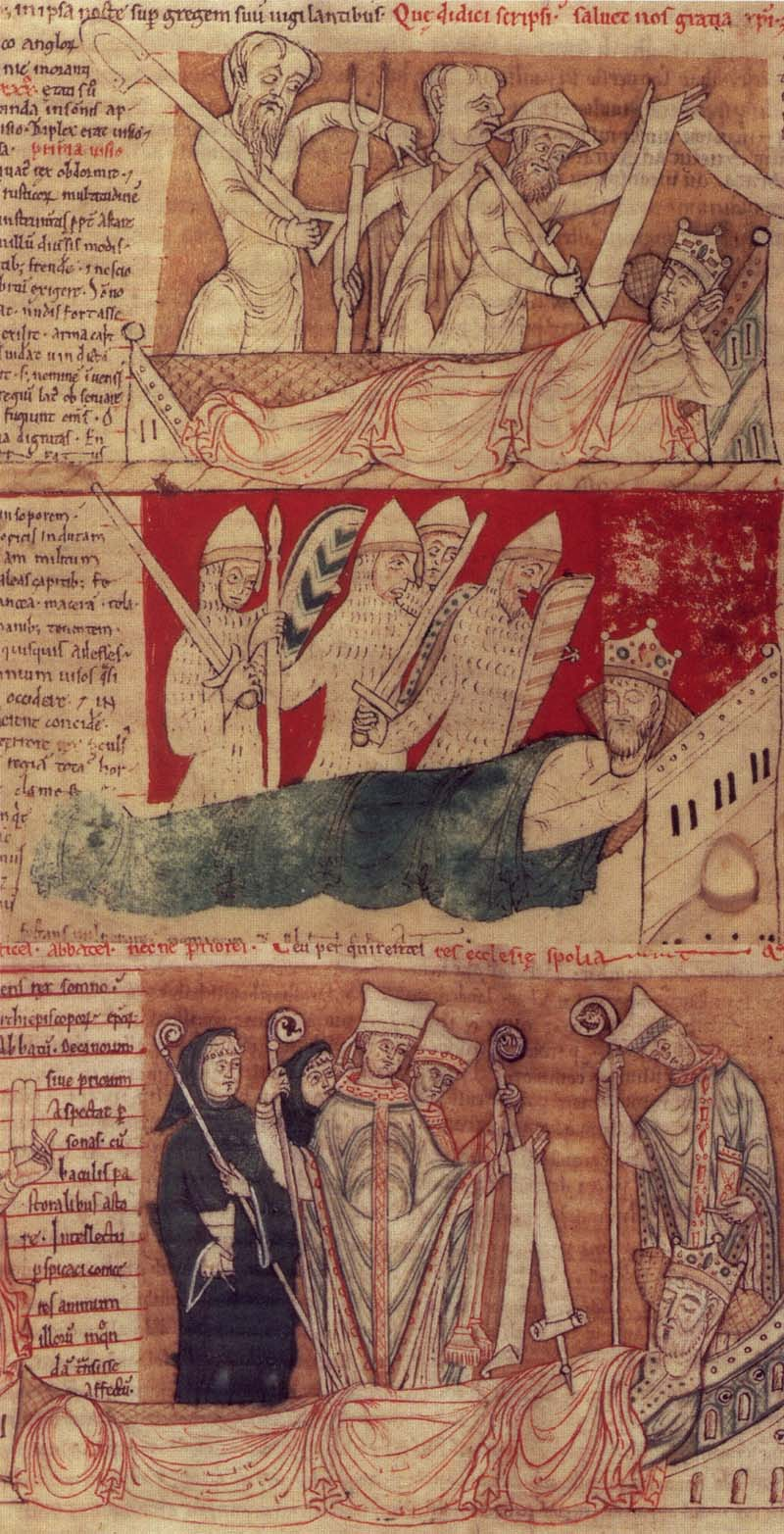
King Henry's Dream from a 12th-century manuscript of the Chronicon ex chronicis of John of Worcester

Warelwast may have been with the hunting party on 2 August 1100, in which King William was accidentally killed, as he was one of the witnesses to the letter sent on 5 August 1100 from William II's brother, the new King Henry I, to Anselm, recalling the archbishop. King Henry continued to use Warelwast as an ambassador, sending him to Rome in 1101 to bring back Pope Paschal II's reply to a letter written by Henry immediately after his accession. Henry was seeking a reconciliation with the papacy, and confirmed to the pope the rights and obedience which his father had rendered, but he also requested the same rights within the Church as his father had enjoyed, chiefly the lay investiture of bishops and the granting of the symbols of episcopal authority by laymen. Paschal declined to grant Henry those rights.

It was Warelwast who told Anselm in 1103 that the king would not permit his return to England. This came after a failed joint mission by Warelwast and Anselm to Paschal, attempting to resolve the dispute between Henry and the archbishop over the king's investiture of bishops, a dispute generally known as the Investiture Controversy. It is quite likely that the king had given instructions that if the mission failed, Warelwast was to inform Anselm that he should only to return to England if he agreed with the king's position in the dispute. In 1106, Warelwast was the king's negotiator in the discussions that led to the settlement of the Investiture Controversy in England. The king ultimately lost little, relinquishing the right to give the actual symbols of episcopal authority to a newly elected bishop in return for continuing to receive homage from the bishops. Early in 1106, Warelwast was sent to Bec Abbey, where Anselm was residing in exile, to inform him of the settlement and deliver to the archbishop the king's invitation to return to England. In May 1107 Warelwast acted as the king's envoy at Paschal's council at Troyes, where Paschal was attempting to secure support for Bohemond of Antioch's proposed campaign against Byzantium. Warelwast probably relayed to the pope the news that King Henry would make no contribution to Bohemond's efforts.

Henry had reserved the episcopal see of Exeter for Warelwast since the death of Osbern FitzOsbern in 1103, but the controversy over investiture meant that his election and consecration were not possible before a settlement was reached. Instead, the king gave Warelwast the office of Archdeacon of Exeter after Osbern's death. The medieval chronicler William of Malmesbury records that Warelwast had earlier tried to remove Osbern from office, but this story probably originates with Eadmer and is of dubious veracity. While archdeacon, Warelwast is recorded as being present at the transfer of a Devon church to Bath Cathedral. He was elected Bishop of Exeter, and was consecrated on 11 August 1107, by Anselm at the royal palace of Westminster. Other bishops consecrated at the same time included William Giffard to Winchester, Roger of Salisbury to Salisbury, Reynelm to Hereford, and Urban to Llandaff. Warelwast's elevation was a reward for his diplomatic efforts in the investiture crisis. The mass consecration signalled the end of the investiture crisis in England.

After his consecration, Warelwast continued to serve the king, often appearing on documents or in accounts of the royal court. The bishop served the king as a messenger, once more carrying messages to Anselm in 1108. He also served as a royal judge, hearing a case at Tamworth in 1114 and another at Westbourne the same year. He was with the king in Normandy in 1111, 1113, and 1118, and may have been in Normandy more frequently. During Henry's reign Warelwast was a witness to 20 of the king's charters.

In 1115, Henry sent Warelwast back to Rome to negotiate with Paschal, who was angry that the king was prohibiting papal legates in England, not allowing clerics to appeal to the papal court, and was failing to secure papal sanction for church councils or the translation of bishops. Warelwast was unable to change the pope's mind, but he did manage to prevent sanctions against the king. Henry also employed Warelwast as a papal envoy during the Canterbury–York disputes over the primacy in the English Church, with visits in 1119, 1120, and possibly also in 1116.

== Work as bishop ==
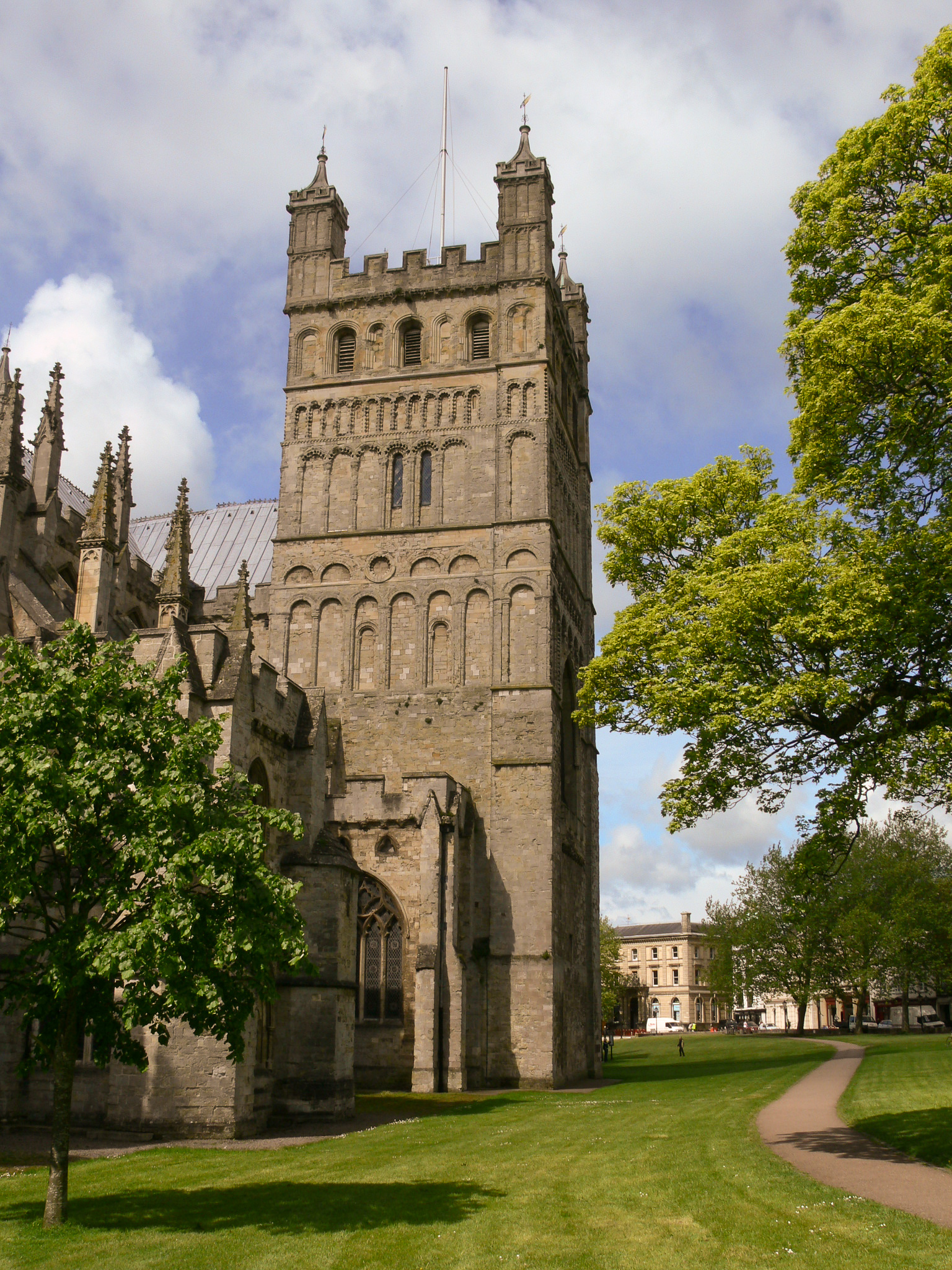
One of the transept towers at Exeter Cathedral, which date from Warelwast's time

As a bishop, Warelwast attended the Council of Reims in 1119 along with three other bishops from England, as well as the Council of Rouen in 1118, a provincial synod for Normandy. In his diocese of Exeter he began the construction of a new cathedral in about 1114; it was consecrated in 1133. The existing two towers in the transepts date from that period. He also replaced the secular clergy staffing collegiate churches with regular canons: at Plympton in 1121 with canons from Aldgate in London, and in 1127 at the church in Launceston in Cornwall. In addition he founded a house of regular canons at Bodmin. Royal charters survive that granted several churches in Cornwall, Devon, and Exeter to Warelwast. (Note: The churches are St Petrock's in Bodmin, St Stephen's in Launceston, St Stephen's in Perranzabuloe, St Stephen's in Probus, the church in Plympton, the church in Braunston, St Stephen's in Exeter, and the church in Colyton.)

Warelwast's relations with his cathedral chapter were good, and no disputes arose during his episcopate. It was not until late in his bishopric that the diocese was split into multiple archdeaconries, which appears to have happened in 1133. Warelwast instituted the two offices of treasurer and precentor for the cathedral chapter, as well as the first sub-archdeacons, who were under the archdeacons. Sub-archdeacons are not attested again at Exeter until the episcopate of Bartholomew Iscanus, who was bishop from 1161 to 1184. William of Malmesbury felt that during Warelwast's episcopate, the cathedral chapter relaxed its communal living, which previously had been strong. It is likely that during Warelwast's episcopate, the canons of the cathedral chapter quit living in a communal dormitory.

Warelwast went blind in his later years, starting in about 1120, which William of Malmesbury regarded as a fitting punishment for Warelwast's alleged attempts to remove his predecessor from office early. He died about 26 September 1137, and was buried in the priory at Plympton. He may have resigned his see prior to his death. The 16th-century antiquary John Leland thought that Warelwast resigned his see before 1127, became a canon at Plympton, and died in 1127. Although Leland's year of death is incorrect, it is possible that Warelwast became a canon shortly before his death. The Annales Plymptonienses records that Robert of Bath, the Bishop of Bath, gave Warelwast his last rites on 26 September 1137, and records that the dying bishop was made a member of the collegiate church at Plympton. Warelwast's nephew Robert Warelwast succeeded as bishop at Exeter in 1138; Robert had been appointed archdeacon of Exeter by his uncle.

The historian C. Warren Hollister described William Warelwast as a "canny and devoted royal servant".

== Citations ==
Catholic Church titles
Preceded by Osbern FitzOsbern	Bishop of Exeter; 1107–1137	Succeeded by Robert Warelwast
