= Wallace (lunar crater) =

Lunar crater

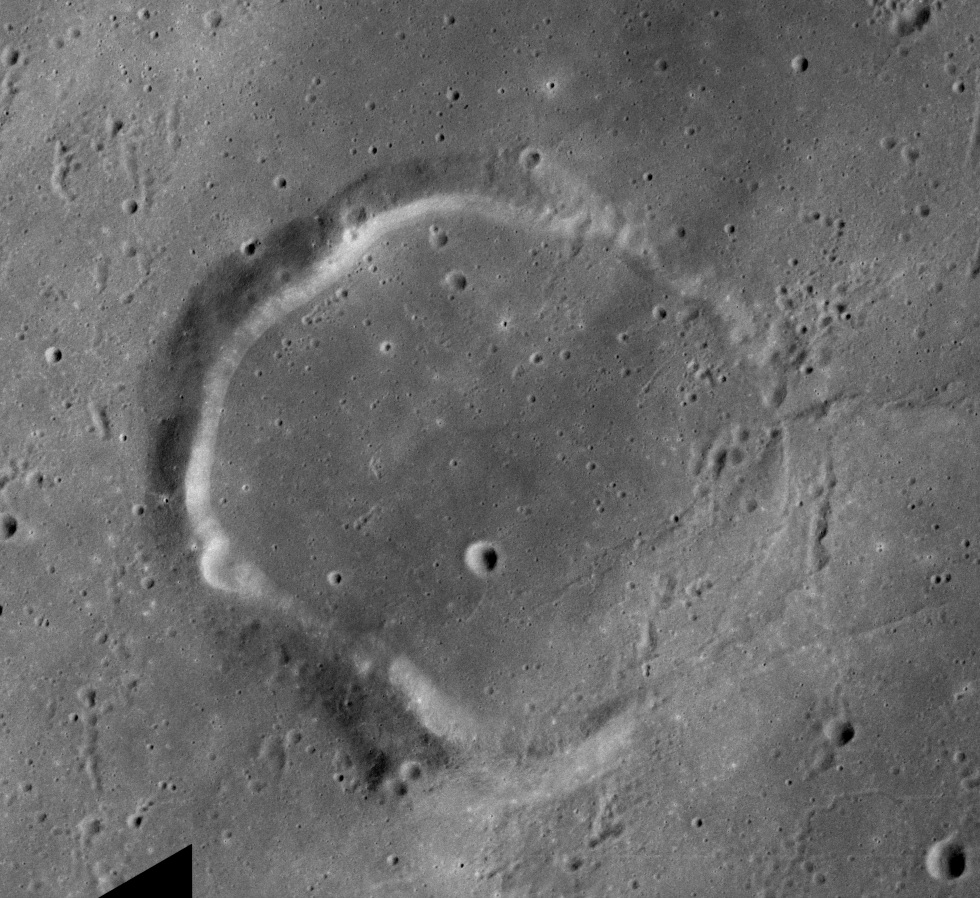
- Apollo 17 Mapping Camera image
- Coordinates: 20.3°N 8.7°W
- Diameter: 26 km
- Depth: 160 m
- Colongitude: 9° at sunrise
- Formation: Imbrian
- Eponym: Alfred R. Wallace

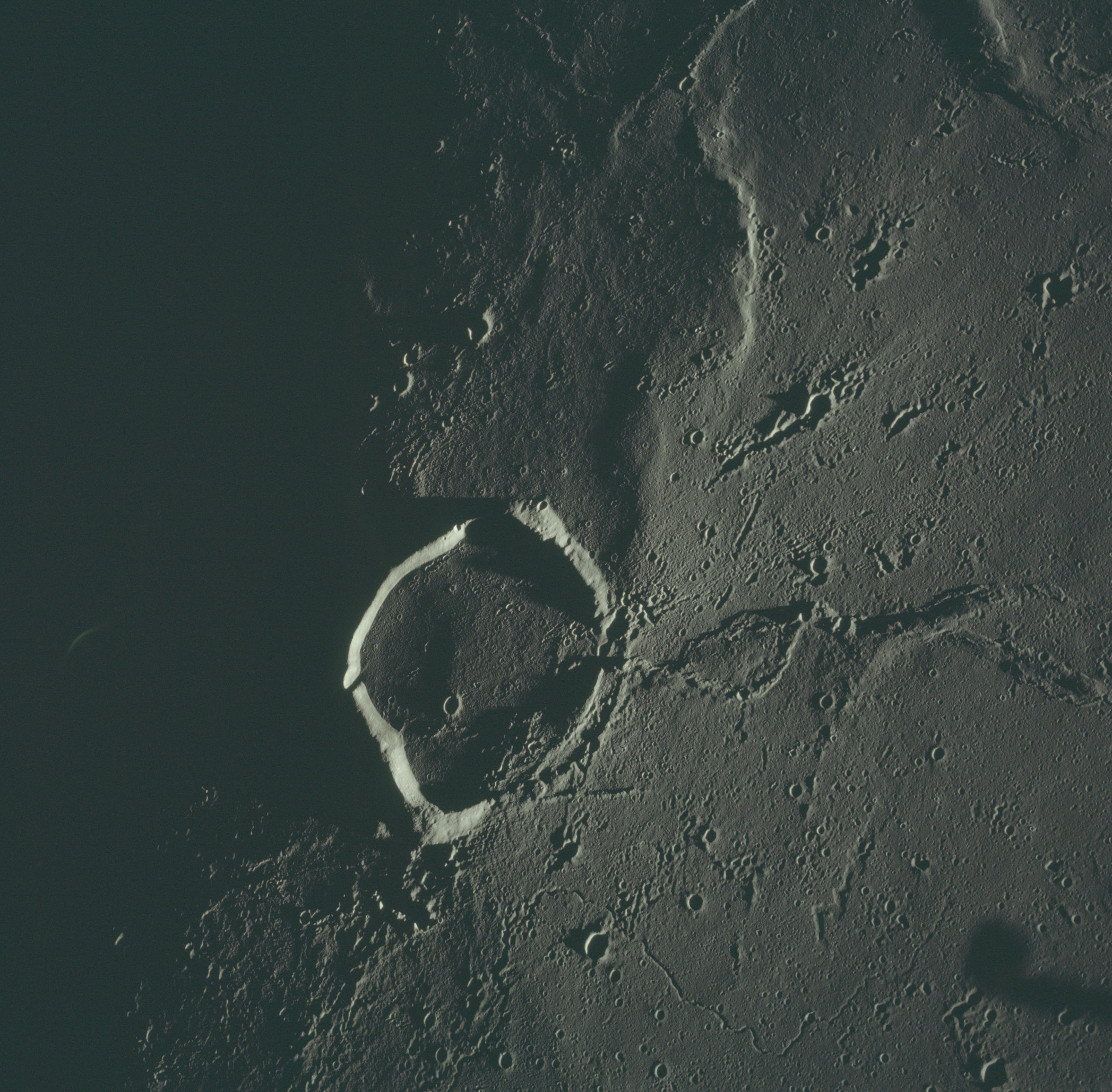
Wallace crater at the terminator. Apollo 17 image

Wallace is the remains of a lunar impact crater that has been flooded by lava. It was named after British natural historian Alfred Russel Wallace. It lies in the southeastern part of Mare Imbrium, northeast of the crater Eratosthenes. The crater rim forms a somewhat polygonal outline, and is broken in the southeast. The floor is flat and devoid of significant features, but it is overlain by ray material from Copernicus to the southwest. The rim ascends to an altitude of 0.4 km above the lunar mare.

== Satellite craters ==
By convention, these features are identified on lunar maps by placing the letter on the side of the crater midpoint closest to Wallace.

| Wallace | Latitude | Longitude | Diameter |
|---|---|---|---|
| A | 19.2° N | 5.6° W | 4 km |
| C | 17.6° N | 6.4° W | 5 km |
| D | 17.9° N | 5.7° W | 4 km |
| H | 21.3° N | 9.1° W | 2 km |
| K | 19.3° N | 6.8° W | 3 km |
| T | 21.9° N | 5.1° W | 2 km |

The following craters have been renamed by the IAU.

- Wallace B — See Huxley (lunar crater).

== View ==
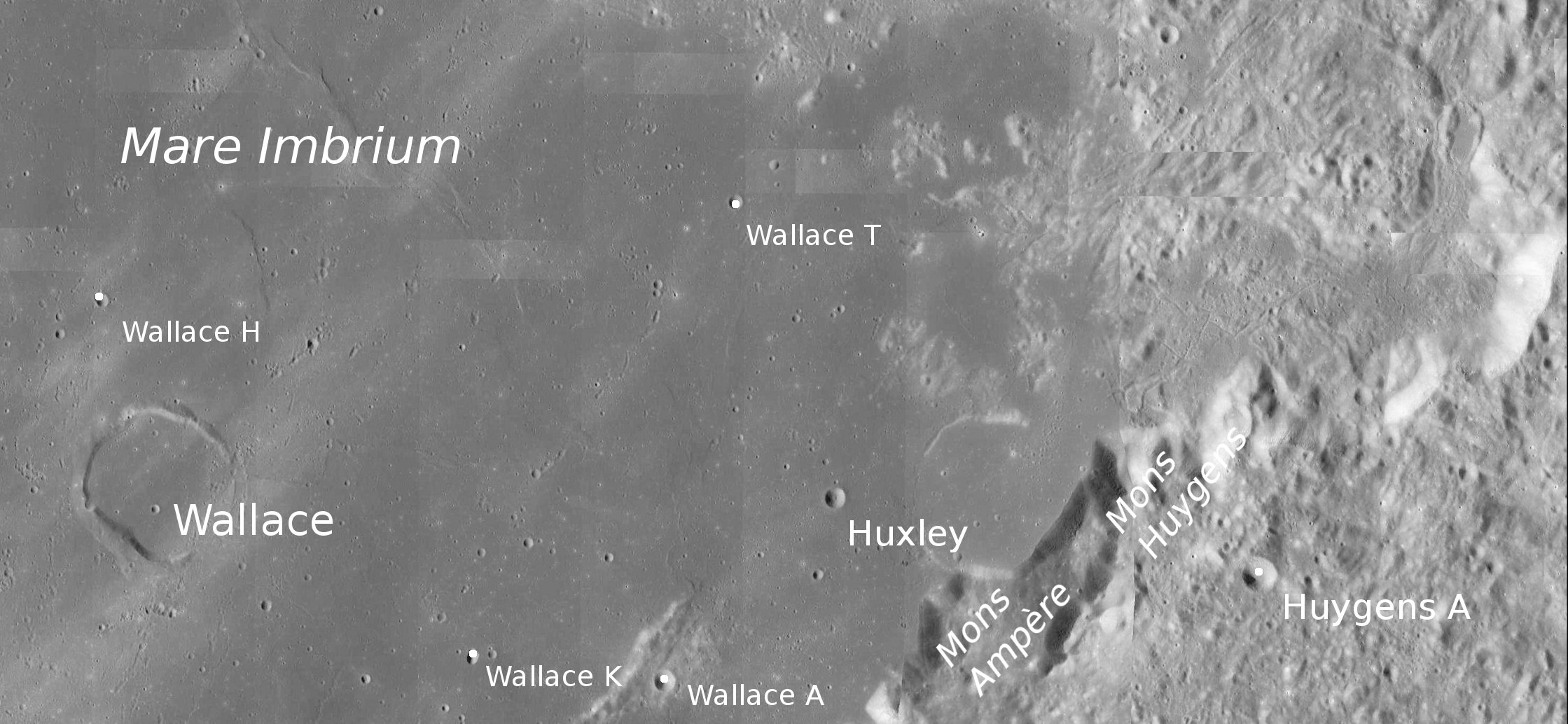
Wallace

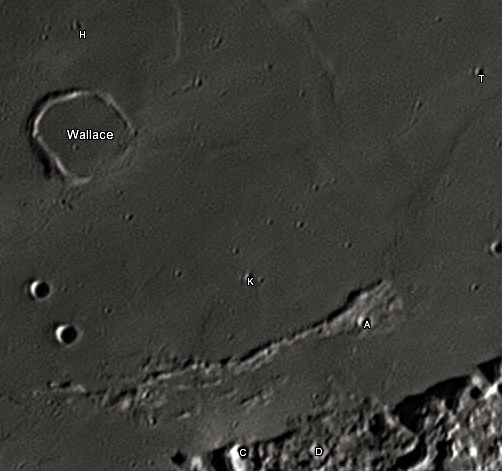
Wallace crater and its satellite craters taken from Earth in 2012 at the University of Hertfordshire's Bayfordbury Observatory with the telescopes Meade LX200 14" and Lumenera Skynyx 2-1
