= Philip Pasterfield =

Philip John Pasterfield was Bishop of Crediton from 1974 to 1984.

Pasterfield was born in Canada on 14 January 1920 and educated at Denstone College and Trinity Hall, Cambridge. After World War II service with the Somerset Light Infantry he studied for ordination and began his career with a curacy at Streatham. He was made a deacon on Trinity Sunday 1951 (20 May) and ordained a priest the Trinity Sunday following (8 June 1952) — both times by Bertram Simpson, Bishop of Southwark, at Southwark Cathedral. Following this he was Vicar of West Lavington, West Sussex then Woolbeding in the same area; and finally, before his ordination to the episcopate, Rural Dean of Birkenhead. He was consecrated a bishop on 18 October 1974 by Michael Ramsey, Archbishop of Canterbury, at Westminster Abbey. In retirement he continued to serve the Diocese of Exeter as an honorary assistant bishop until his death on 29 January 2001.

Church of England titles
Preceded by Wilfrid Westall	Bishop of Crediton; 1974 – 1984	Succeeded by Peter Coleman
