= Robert Trefusis =

English bishop (1843–1930)

- Bishop of Crediton
- Diocese: Diocese of Exeter
- In office: 1897–1930 (d.)
- Successor: William Surtees
- Other post: Archdeacon of Barnstaple (1909–1930)

Orders
- Ordination: 1866
- Consecration: 1897 by Frederick Temple (Canterbury)

Personal details
- Born: 24 January 1843 Bideford, Devon, UK
- Died: 9 July 1930 (aged 87)
- Denomination: Anglican
- Parents: Robert Trefusis, 17th Baron Clinton (grandfather)
- Education: Exeter College, Oxford

Robert Edward Trefusis (24 January 1843 – 9 July 1930) was the first suffragan Bishop of Crediton from 1897 to 1930.

== Origins ==
Trefusis was born in Bideford in 1843, the second son of George Trefusis (1793–1849), a younger son of Robert Trefusis, 17th Baron Clinton (1764–1797).

== Career ==
Trefusis was educated at Cheltenham College and Exeter College, Oxford. Ordained in 1866, he began his ordained ministry as a curate in Buckingham. He was then appointed by his cousin Mark Rolle, Lord of the manor and patron of the living, as Vicar of Chittlehampton. The parish church of Chittlehampton was dedicated to the little-known St Urith, believed to have been a local Saxon maiden born and martyred within the parish, and Trefusis named one of his daughters Hyeritha Trefusis in her honour. She became known to local parishioners as "Miss Urith".

He subsequently served for 33 years as Bishop suffragan of Crediton; he was also additionally Archdeacon of Barnstaple from 1909. He was consecrated a bishop on St Matthias' Day (24 February 1897), by Frederick Temple, Archbishop of Canterbury, at St Paul's Cathedral. He died on 9 July 1930.

He celebrated the dedication of the Exeter War Memorial.

Church of England titles
New title	Bishop of Crediton; 1897–1930	Succeeded by William Surtees
