= Robin Lloyd-Jones =

British writer (1934–2024)

Robin Lloyd-Jones (5 October 1934 – 5 September 2024) was a British writer of both fiction and non-fiction.

== Life and career ==
Lloyd-Jones was born in London on 5 October 1934. He grew up in India, before being educated at Blundell's School in Devon and Selwyn College, Cambridge, where he graduated with a pass degree in social anthropology in 1957. He then moved to Scotland to work as an Education Adviser for Strathclyde Regional Council. He soon became part of the vibrant Scottish writing scene, serving as President of the Scottish Association of Writers (1993–1996) and President of the Scottish Branch of PEN International (1997–2000), and chairing the Writers in Prison Committee which campaigns on behalf of persecuted writers. He was for several years a tutor in Creative Writing at the University of Glasgow.

Lloyd-Jones died on 5 September 2024, at the age of 89.

== Publications ==
=== Books ===
- Autumn Voices: Scottish writers over 70 talk about creativity in later life (PlaySpace Publications, 2018) "An engaging book with an important message." (James Robertson); "This book is just amazing. A treasure trove." (John Killick).
- The Sweet Especial Scene (Two Ravens Press, 2014) - a collection of wilderness writings spanning 40 years.
- The Sunlit Summit (Sandstone Press, 2013) – a biography of the Scottish mountaineer, writer and conservationist, W.H. Murray. "A subtle and wonderful biography." (Robert Macfarlane); "Robin Lloyd-Jones treats the reader to a masterclass in the biographer's art." (Ken Lussey). Winner of the Saltire Society's Research Book of the Year Award 2013.
- Argonauts of the Western Isles (updated version with new chapters, Whittles Publishing, 2008) - non-fiction account of sea kayaking on the west coast of Scotland.
- Red Fox Running (Andersen Press, 2007) – a novel for teenagers, set in the Arctic, looking at environmental issues. Short-listed for Heart of Hawick Children's Book Award; long-list for Manchester Children's Book Award.
- Fallen Pieces of the Moon (Whittles Publishing, 2006) – an account of a kayak trip in Greenland made by the author.
- Fallen Angels (Canongate, 1992) – short stories about the lives of street children in South America. "Compassionate and deeply moving" (Contemporary Review); "His commitment and empathy show. This book hurts" (Books in Scotland).
- Argonauts of the Western Isles (Diadem, 1989) – non-fiction account of sea kayaking on the west coast of Scotland.
- The Dreamhouse (Hutchinson, 1985) – a novel. A surrealist satire set in a remote 19th century gold-rush town in Alaska. The arrival of a con-man turns the community upside down. A Booker Prize entry. "Fantastic, funny and inventive, a tonic to read" (The Guardian).
- Lord of the Dance (Gollancz and Arena; in US: Little Brown; in Spain: Argos Vergara, all in 1983) – a novel. A 16th century English doctor on a quest to find a cure for leprosy in the India of Moghul Emperor, Akbar. Winner of BBC Bookshelf First Novel Award and a Booker Prize entry. "A significant literary discovery" (The Glasgow Herald); "Astonishing imaginative brilliance" (The Times).

=== Radio Drama ===
- Rainmaker (BBC radio drama, 1997) – two missionaries in 19th century Africa are caught up in a rainmaking ritual and sacrifice.
- Ice in Wonderland (BBC radio drama, 1992 – an adaptation for radio of the author's novel, The Dreamhouse. Winner of BBC Best Radio Drama Script Award, 1994. "An original and remarkable script." (Radio Times).

=== Film Scripts ===
- Forest - a 20-minute DVD commissioned by Warwick University Engineering Department, 2012.
- Wolf - a 20-minute film for Timespan Arts Centre, Helmsdale, about the last wolf in Sutherland, 2011.
- River - a 10-minute DVD sponsored by Scottish Natural Heritage, 2009.

=== Articles ===
Many articles for Scots Magazine, the Scotsman, the Glasgow Herald, the Guardian, the Times Educational Supplement and other journals. Description of a moonlight climb anthologised in The Winding Trail (Diadem, 1981).
