= Gilbert Phelps =

British educationist and author (1915–1993)

Gilbert Phelps (3 January 1915 – 15 June 1993) was a British educationist and author, best known for nine distinguished novels that he wrote between 1953 and 1975 and for his literary criticism which embraces several foreign literatures, chiefly Russian and African.

== Life ==
Gilbert Henry Phelps was born in Gloucester, won a scholarship to a grammar school and another to Cambridge, where he graduated with a double First in English. He was a research student, lecturer, and tutor at Cambridge from 1937 to 1939. From 1940 to 1942, during the Second World War, he lectured for the British Council in Lisbon. On returning to England, he became Senior English Master at Blundell's School.

Phelps began writing when he was still at school. His collections of poems and short stories appeared in many periodicals and collections, both in England and America. His first novel the Dry Stone was published both in England and America in 1953, as was his second novel A Man in His Prime. He wrote articles on literary and educational subjects and also wrote for radio. Phelps then became Chief Instructor, Sound, for Staff Training at the BBC. He wrote, edited and contributed introductions to a number of books published by the Folio Society.

Phelps married Kay Batchelor, a writer and broadcaster.

== Career with BBC ==
Phelps's appointments with the BBC included:

- Talks Producer, BBC Bristol 1945-50
- Supervisor, Educational Talks 1950-52
- Producer, Third Programme 1950-53
- General Instructor, Staff Training Department, BBC 1953-56
- General Instructor 1956-60

== Bibliography ==
- Living Writers; Being Critical Studies Broadcast in the BBC 3rd Programme (editor, 1947)
- The Dry Stone, published in the United Kingdom and then published in the U.S.A. under the title The Heart in the Desert (1954)
- A Man in His Prime, published in the United Kingdom by Hutchinson (1955)
- The Russian Novel in English Fiction (1956)
- The Centenarians: A Fable (1958)
- The Love Before the First (1960)
- A Short History of English Literature (1962), revised and expanded as A Survey of English Literature (1965)
- The Winter People (1963)
- Tenants of the House (1971)
- The Old Believer, published in the U.S.A. under the title Mortal Flesh (1973)
- The Rare Adventures and Painful Peregrinations of William Lithgow (editor, 1974)
- The Low Roads (1975)
- Squire Waterton (1976)
- Arlott and Trueman on Cricket (editor, 1977)
- From Myth to Modernism: A Short Guide to the World Novel (1987)
