= Edward Trelawney =

English clergyman

Edward Trelawney (c. 1653 – October 1726), of Coldrenick, near Liskeard, Cornwall, was an English Anglican clergyman who served as dean and archdeacon of Exeter between 1717 and 1726.

Trelawney was the son of Jonathan Trelawny, gentleman of St Germans, Cornwall, and a descendant of Sir Jonathan Trelawny, MP of Trelawne (died 1604) who left the Coldrenick estate in Menheniot to his second son Edward. He matriculated at Trinity College, Oxford, on 7 April 1671, aged 18. He was awarded B.A. from Christ Church, Oxford, in 1674 and an M.A. in 1677.

Trelawney was appointed rector of St Tudy in 1677, and of South Hill, Cornwall, in 1691. He became a canon in 1699 and sub-dean of Exeter in 1705. In 1717 he became Dean of Exeter and Archdeacon of Exeter and remained in post until his death on 21 or 24 October 1726.

Trelawney married Elizabeth Darell, daughter of Thomas Darell of Chawcroft, Hampshire and had sons Darell and Charles, who were both Members of Parliament.

There are a number of interesting monuments to the Trelawnys in Menheniot parish church including those of Edward Trelawney, Dean of Exeter (d. 1726) and Darell Trelawny.

== Notes ==
Church of England titles
| Preceded by Lancelot Blackburne | Dean of Exeter; 1717–1726 | Succeeded by John Gilbert |
| Preceded by Ofspring Blackall | Archdeacon of Exeter; 1717–1726 | Succeeded by Richard Ibbetson |
