= Blundell's School =

Public school in Devon, England

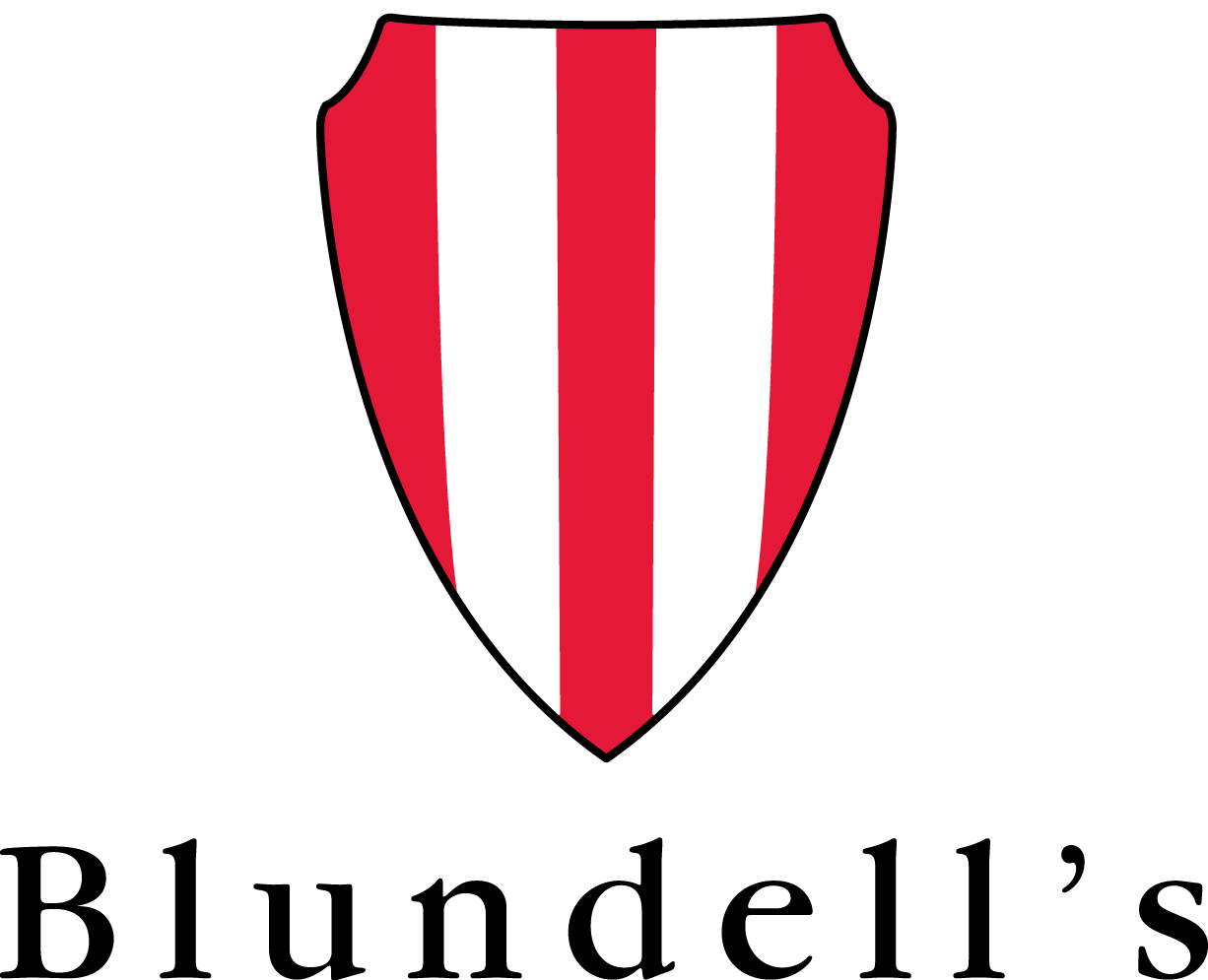

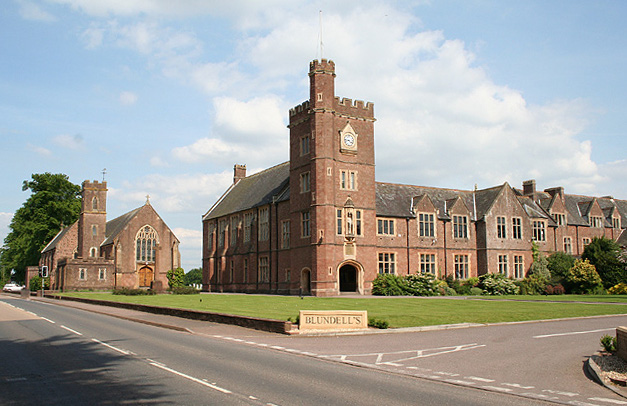

Location
- Blundells Road; Tiverton, Devon, EX16 4DN; England; 50.906499°N 3.466174°W

Information
- Type: Public school Private day and boarding school
- Motto: Pro Patria Populoque (For the country and the people)
- Established: 1604; 422 years ago
- Founder: Peter Blundell
- Department for Education URN: 113575 Tables
- Chairman of the Governors: Nigel Hall
- Head: Bart Wielenga
- Staff: 360
- Gender: Co-educational
- Age: 3 to 18
- Enrolment: c. 615 in senior school c. 251 in preparatory school
- Houses: Francis House (Boys) Gorton House (Girls); North Close (Girls); Old House (Boys); Petergate (Boys); School House (Years 7 and 8) Westlake (Sixth Form)
- Colours: Red & White
- Former pupils: Old Blundellians
- Website: http://www.blundells.org

Blundell's School is an independent co-educational boarding and day school in the English public school tradition, located in Tiverton, Devon. It was founded in 1604 under the will of Peter Blundell, one of the richest men in England at the time, and moved to its present site on the outskirts of the town in 1882.

The full boarding fees are £45,750 per year. The school offers several scholarships and bursaries and provides flexi-boarding. The school has 360 boys and 225 girls, including 117 boys and 85 girls in the Sixth Form and is a member of the Headmasters' and Headmistresses' Conference.

== History ==
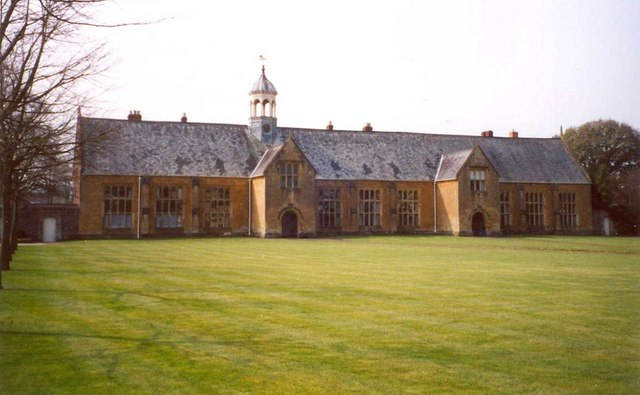
Old Blundell's

Peter Blundell, one of the wealthiest merchants of Elizabethan England, died in 1601, having made his fortune principally in the cloth industry. His will set aside considerable money and land to establish a school in his home town "to maintain sound learning and true religion". Blundell asked his friend John Popham, Lord Chief Justice of England, to carry out his wishes, and appointed a number of local merchants and gentry as his first trustees (known as feoffees). The position of feoffee is no longer hereditary, but a number of notable local families have held the position for a considerable period: the first ancestor of the current chairman of the governors to hold that position was elected more than 250 years ago, and the Heathcoat-Amory family have a long tradition of service on the Governing Body, since Sir John Heathcoat-Amory was appointed in 1865.

The Old Blundell's School was built to be much larger and grander than any other in the West Country, with room for 150 scholars and accommodation for a master and an usher. The Grade I listed building is now in the care of the National Trust and the forecourt is usually open to visitors. One ex-Blundell's boy was the writer R. D. Blackmore, who in the novel Lorna Doone set the stage for a fight between John Ridd and Robin Snell on the Blundell's triangular lawn.

Peter Blundell's executors established links with Balliol College, Oxford, and with Sidney Sussex College, Cambridge, and large sums were settled to provide for scholarships for pupils of the school to attend those colleges.

The prep school St Aubyn's was moved to the Blundell's campus in 2000, taking over the day-boy house Milestones and the Sanatorium, and was renamed Blundell's Prep School. It has about 250 pupils aged from three years to eleven. The headmaster is Andy Southgate.

=== 2024 attempted murder ===
In 2024, a pupil at the school was found guilty of attempted murder of two other students and one of the staff using a hammer; he had been 16 at the time of the assaults in 2023. The Guardian said that "a troubling picture emerged of aspects of life at the 400-year-old school", with bullying, children having weapons and unrestricted access to their mobile telephones.

The boy was sentenced to life in prison, with a minimum of 12 years. In November 2024, Mrs Justice Cutts lifted the anonymity orders and named him as Thomas Wei Huang from Malaysia.

== Sport ==
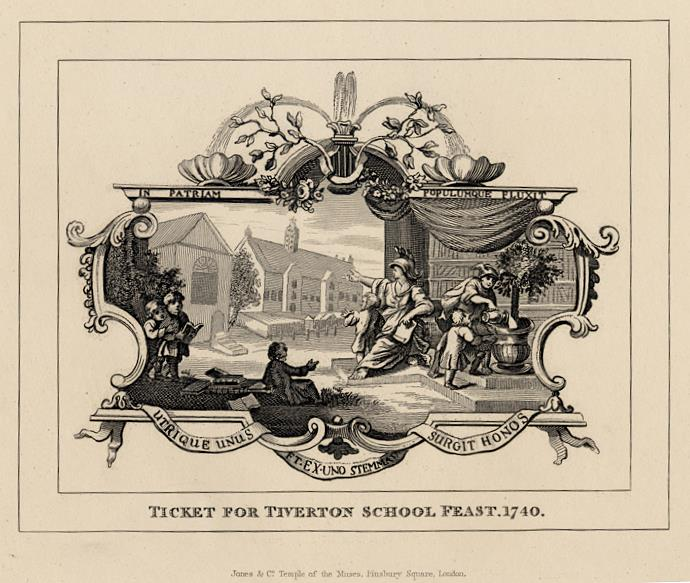
1740 ticket for Blundell's School Feast by William Hogarth

=== Rugby ===
Rugby is the main sport played at Blundell's in the Autumn and Spring terms. The earliest mention of "football" in the Blundellian was in 1861 and the first recorded "rugger" match played by boys at Blundell's was in 1868 against Tiverton Rugby Club, making the school one of the oldest anywhere formally to play the game. The Blundell's crest still hangs in the main room at Twickenham in recognition of this.

OBs Dave Lewis Gloucester Rugby, Matt Kvesic and Will Carrick-Smith Exeter Chiefs all currently play in the Aviva Premiership.

Sam Maunder, brother of Jack Maunder, plays for England U18 squad.

=== The Russell ===
An annual tradition is a cross-country run known as the Russell, named after Old Boy Jack Russell, a vicar and dog-breeder. It was first run in 1887, and 2009 saw the 129th run.

== Southern Railway Schools Class ==
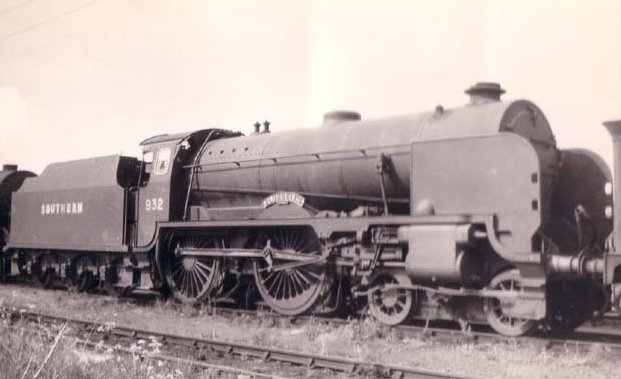
932 Blundell's Schools Class 4-4-0 at Eastleigh in 1948.

The School lent its name to the thirty-third steam locomotive (Engine 932) in the Southern Railway's Class V of which there were 40. This class was also known as the Schools Class because all 40 of the class were named after prominent English public schools. Blundell's, as it was called, was built in 1934. The locomotive bearing the school's name was withdrawn from service in January 1961. In 2009 Hornby produced a model of this particular Schools class locomotive. As the product photograph shows, while the name of this locomotive has been variously quoted as Blundells or Blundell's, the apostrophe does actually appear on the nameplate.

== Old Blundellians ==
The first known society of former pupils, known as Old Blundellians (OBs), was established as early as 1725.

William Hogarth engraved the letterhead for the invitation to a dinner for former pupils of the School in 1725 and the ticket for Tiverton School Feast in 1740.

Notable former pupils include:

- Robert Arundell, Governor of the Windward Islands and Barbados
- Vernon Bartlett, journalist and politician
- Edward Bellew, drainage inspector and winner of the Victoria Cross
- Dominic Bess, England cricketer
- R. D. Blackmore, author of Lorna Doone
- Richard Bowring, Master of Selwyn College, Cambridge
- William Buckland, geologist
- William Edward Buckley, professor of Anglo-Saxon
- George Bull, theologian and bishop
- Giles Bullard, High Commissioner to the West Indies
- Charles Campion, food critic
- Bampfylde Moore Carew, rogue and imposter
- Aelred Carlyle, missionary and monk
- Frederick William Cuming, 1900 Olympic gold medal winner as part of the UK cricket team
- Charles Cornwallis Chesney, soldier and military writer
- George Tomkyns Chesney, soldier and novelist
- Ben Collins, Formula 3 racing driver and the infamous Stig
- John Conybeare, Bishop of Bristol and notable 18th-century theologian
- Natalie Dew, actress
- John Davis, Welsh cricketer
- Edward Dayman, hymn writer
- John Ebdon, writer
- John Eliot, English statesman
- Tristan Evans, Drummer & backing vocals for UK based band The Vamps
- Howard Ford, Olympic athlete
- Charles Rossiter Forwood, lawyer and Attorney General of Fiji
- Francis Fulford, Anglo-Catholic bishop of Montreal
- John Gay, philosopher
- Anthony Gifford, cricketer and educator
- Michael Gilbert, writer of mysteries and thrillers
- Douglas Gracey, Commander in Chief Pakistan Army 1948–51
- Charles Harper, Governor and Commander-in-Chief of St. Helena 1925–1932
- C. Brian Haselgrove mathematician best known for disproving the Pólya conjecture in 1958
- Thomas Hayter, bishop of Norwich 1749–61, bishop of London 1761–62
- Abraham Hayward, man of letters
- Archibald Hill, Nobel Prize winner
- David Gordon Hines, developer of co-operatives in Tanganyika and Uganda
- Walter Hook, Tractarian vicar of Leeds
- Ella Hunt, actress, dickinson, anna and the apocalypse, intruders
- James Jeremie, academic and churchman
- John Jeremie, Governor of Sierra Leone
- C. E. M. Joad, intellectual, broadcasting personality and fare dodger
- Philip Keun, Special Operations Executive Captain and co-leader of the Jade-Amicol French resistance network.
- Geoffrey Lampe, theologian and winner of the Military Cross
- Wilfrid Le Gros Clark, surgeon, primatologist and paleoanthropologist who disproved Piltdown Man
- Robin Lloyd-Jones, Author
- Jeremy Lloyds, Test Cricket umpire
- George Malcolm, army officer
- Thomas Manton, Puritan clergyman
- John Margetson, former British Ambassador to Vietnam, the United Nations, and the Netherlands.
- Vic Marks, Somerset and England cricketer
- John Marrack, emeritus Professor of Chemical Pathology in the University of London
- Michael Mates, former MP (constituency of East Hampshire)
- Hugh Morris, England cricketer and current managing director of the England and Wales Cricket Board
- Gordon Newton, Editor of the Financial Times
- Christopher Ondaatje, author and donor to the Labour Party
- William Pillar, Fourth Sea Lord and Chief of Naval Supplies
- John de la Pole, 6th Baronet
- Ben Rice, novelist
- John Rinkel, Olympic athlete
- Jack Russell, Victorian hunting parson, dog breeder
- Peter Schidlof, Austrian-British violist and co-founder of the Amadeus Quartet
- Edward Seymour, 16th Duke of Somerset
- Evelyn Seymour, 17th Duke of Somerset
- Percy Seymour, 18th Duke of Somerset
- Richard Sharp, England rugby captain
- Richard Shore, cricketer
- Frederick Spring, senior army officer
- Trevor Spring, army officer
- J. C. Squire, poet, writer, historian, and influential literary editor
- Donald Stokes, industrialist and peer
- Jon Swain, award-winning writer, whose memoirs were portrayed in the film The Killing Fields
- Frederick Temple, Archbishop of Canterbury
- Clem Thomas, Wales Rugby Captain
- Georgia "Toff" Toffolo, television and media personality
- Charles Trevelyan, 1st Baronet, English civil servant, governor of Madras
- Henry Hawkins Tremayne, creator of the Lost Gardens of Heligan
- John Van der Kiste, author
- Walter Walker, controversial soldier and writer
- Arthur Graeme West, war poet
- John Whiteley, Deputy Chief of the Imperial General Staff 1949–53
- Cyril Wilkinson, Great Britain hockey player and Olympic Gold Medallist
- Geoffrey Willans, humorist and co-author of Nigel Molesworth series
- Matthew Wood, 1st Baronet, Lord Mayor of London, MP for the City of London and close friend of Queen Caroline
- John Wyndham, author whose work included The Day of the Triffids and The Midwich Cuckoos

== Headteachers ==
- 2018-present: Bart Wielenga
- 2013–2018: Nicola Huggett
- 2012–2013: Randall Thane
- 2004–2012: Ian Davenport
- 1992–2004: Jonathan Leigh
- 1980–1992: A. J. D. Rees
- 1971–1980: A. Clive S. Gimson
- 1959–1971: J. M. Stanton
- 1947–1959: J. S. Carter
- 1943–1947: R. L. Roberts
- 1934–1942: Neville Gorton
- 1930–1933: Alexander Wallace
- 1917–1930: Arthur Edwin Wynne
- 1874–1917: A. L. Francis
- 1847–1874: John Hughes
- 1834–1847: Henry Sanders
- 1823–1834: Alldersey Dicken
- 1797–1823: William Richards
- 1775–1797: Richard Keats, rector of Bideford and King's Nympton, father of Richard Goodwin Keats (1757–1834), Martha Keats (1753–1833) and of Lewis William Buck (1784–1858), MP.
- 1757–1775: Philip Atherton
- 1740–1757: William Daddo
- 1734–1740: Samuel Wesley
- 1733–1734: John Jones
- 1730–1733: Samual Smith
- 1698–1730: William Rayner
- 1684–1698: John Sanders
- 1669–1684: George Hume
- 1651–1669: Henry Batten
- 1648–1651: Henry Osborne
- 1604–1647: Samuel Butler

== Notable former masters ==
Former masters of Blundell's have included:

- Terry Barwell, cricketer
- Manning Clark, historian
- Neville Gorton, Bishop of Coventry
- Malcolm Moss, politician
- Grahame Parker, sportsman
- C. Northcote Parkinson, naval historian and author of the bestselling book Parkinson's Law
- Gilbert Phelps, writer and broadcaster
- Lawrence Sail, poet
- Willi Soukop, sculptor
- Stephen Spender, poet and essayist
- Mervyn Stockwood, missioner to the School and later Bishop of Southwark
- Samuel Wesley (the Younger), poet and churchman
