= Richard Ibbetson =

Richard Ibbetson was Archdeacon of Exeter from 11 November 1726 until his death on 1 September 1731.

Ibbetson was born at Ledston in the West Riding of Yorkshire and educated at University College, Oxford. He became a Fellow of Oriel College, Oxford in 1700; Rector of Hadleigh, Suffolk in 1714; Rector of Lambeth in 1718;Prebendary and Canon Residentiary of Exeter Cathedral in 1716; and its Precentor in 1723. He died at Hackington.

Church of England titles
Preceded by Edward Trelawney	Archdeacon of Exeter; 1726–1732	Succeeded by Stephen Weston
