= Aaron Wilson (priest) =

The Venerable Aaron Wilson (16 October 1589 – 28 March 1643) was an Anglican clergyman and divine.

== Life ==
Aaron Wilson matriculated from Queen's College, Oxford, on 16 October 1607, as "cler. fil. æt. 18". He graduated MA in 1615, and D.D. on 17 May 1639. He held the living of St Stephen's, Walbrook: he was collated rector in December 1625. He was appointed chaplain to Charles I and installed Archdeacon of Exeter in January 1634; in this same year he became vicar of Plymouth (St. Andrew's), to which benefice he was instituted by Charles I. In the same year he made a nomination of Theodore Holdich to be one of the preachers in India. Wilson and his flock quarrelled over temporalities, and he took proceedings in the Star-chamber, but failed to prove the alleged encroachments. The corporation, nevertheless, thought it wise to surrender the right of presentation to the King, who regranted it under conditions. When the Civil War broke out, the vicar was sent prisoner by the townsfolk to Portsmouth; he died at Exeter in July 1643, bequeathing to his son an unswerving faith in the greatness of royal prerogative.

== Bibliography ==
- Seccombe, Thomas (1900). "Wilson, John (1627?-1696)" . In Lee, Sidney (ed.). Dictionary of National Biography. Vol. 62. London: Smith, Elder & Co. p. 104.
