= Robert of Chichester =

12th-century Bishop of Exeter

- Bishop of Exeter
- Appointed: before June 1155
- Term ended: before April 1161
- Predecessor: Robert Warelwast
- Successor: Bartholomew Iscanus
- Other post: Dean of Salisbury

Personal details
- Died: before April 1161
- Denomination: Catholic

Robert of Chichester (died before April 1161) was a medieval Bishop of Exeter.

Robert is often confused with his predecessor, Robert Warelwast. His surname comes from a single source, one of his successors. He was a relative of David FitzGerald, bishop of St David's, but the exact relationship is unknown. He held a prebend at Islington in the diocese of London, and was dean of Salisbury from 1148. He was consecrated on 5 June 1155 or perhaps on 3 June.

John of Salisbury felt that Robert gained the bishopric by simony, and his rule seems to have been unpopular. He brought in a number of clergy from the diocese of Salisbury, and acted as a patron to his successor Bartholomew Iscanus as well as Baldwin of Exeter, who was later to become Archbishop of Canterbury.

Robert died on 10 March 1160 according to the Handbook of British Chronology, but other sources just say he died before 18 April 1161. His burial site is unknown.

== Citations ==
Catholic Church titles
Preceded by Robert Warelwast	Bishop of Exeter; 1155–1160	Succeeded by Bartholomew Iscanus
