= Bishop of Crediton =

Episcopal title

The Bishop of Crediton is an episcopal title which takes its name from the town of Crediton in Devon, England. Since 1897, it has been used by the Church of England as the title of a suffragan bishop who, along with the Bishop of Plymouth, assists the diocesan Bishop of Exeter in overseeing the Diocese of Exeter.

The title was originally used by the Anglo-Saxons in the 10th and 11th centuries for a diocese covering Devon and Cornwall.

== List of bishops suffragan ==
Bishops suffragan of Crediton
From	Until	Incumbent	Notes
1897	1930	Robert Trefusis	
1930	1954	William Surtees	
1954	1974	Wilfrid Westall	
1974	1984	Philip Pasterfield	
1984	1996	Peter Coleman	
1996	2004	Richard Hawkins	Formerly Bishop of Plymouth.
2004	October 2012	Bob Evens	Retired on 31 October 2012.
November 2012	19 April 2015	Nick McKinnel	Translated to Plymouth 19 April 2015.
22 July 2015	8 March 2018	Sarah Mullally	Announced 9 June 2015; consecrated 22 July; translated to London on 8 March 2018. translated to Canterbury on 28 January 2026.
2018	2025	Jackie Searle	Consecrated 27 September 2018; retired January 2025.
2025	present	Moira Astin	Announced June 2025; and consecrated 3 July.
