= Osbern FitzOsbern =

11th and 12th-century Bishop of Exeter

- Bishop of Exeter
- Appointed: 1072
- Predecessor: Leofric
- Successor: William Warelwast
- Other post: royal chaplain

Orders
- Consecration: 27 May 1072 by Lanfranc

Personal details
- Died: 1103
- Denomination: Catholic

Osbern FitzOsbern (d. 1103) was a Norman churchman. He was a relative of King Edward the Confessor as well as being a royal chaplain. During Edward's reign he received the church at Bosham, near Chichester. He was present at the consecration of Westminster Abbey at Christmas 1065. He was a steward for King William I of England during his reign, as well as being a friend of the king. The story that he became William's chancellor is based entirely on a charter that modern historians have declared mostly spurious. He became Bishop of Exeter in 1072, and was consecrated at St. Paul's in London on 27 May 1072 by the Archbishop of Canterbury, Lanfranc.

Osbern was present at the church councils held in 1072 and 1075. Osbern was present at the first Christmas court held by King William II of England after his accession. Osbern did not attend the church council held by Anselm, the new Archbishop of Canterbury in 1102, as he was ill.

Osbern became embroiled in a dispute with the monks of Battle Abbey, who had established a priory in Exeter. The cathedral chapter of Exeter objected to the priory establishing a graveyard or ringing their bells, and both sides appealed to Anselm, who ruled in Battle's favour on the bell issue. The dispute over the graveyard was still ongoing in 1102, when Pope Paschal II wrote to Osbern ordering him to allow the priory to establish a graveyard for their benefactors.

Osbern died in 1103, having gone blind before his death. Frank Barlow, a medieval historian, described Osbern as "unsociable".

William FitzOsbern, Earl of Hereford was his brother. Their father was Osbern de Crépon, a guardian and seneschal to the young Duke William.

== Sources ==
- Barlow, Frank (1970). Edward the Confessor. Berkeley, CA: University of California Press. ISBN 0-520-01671-8.
- Barlow, Frank (1979). The English Church 1066–1154: A History of the Anglo-Norman Church. New York: Longman. ISBN 0-582-50236-5.
- Barlow, Frank (1983). William Rufus. Berkeley, CA: University of California Press. ISBN 0-520-04936-5.
- Brett, M. (1975). The English Church under Henry I. Oxford, UK: Oxford University Press. ISBN 0-19-821861-3.
- Douglas, David C. (1964). William the Conqueror: The Norman Impact Upon England. Berkeley, CA: University of California Press. OCLC 399137.
- Fryde, E. B.; Greenway, D. E.; Porter, S.; Roy, I. (1996). Handbook of British Chronology (Third revised ed.). Cambridge, UK: Cambridge University Press. ISBN 0-521-56350-X.
- Kingsford, C. L. (2004). "Osbern (d. 1103)". In Costambeys, Marios (ed.). Oxford Dictionary of National Biography. Oxford University Press. doi:10.1093/ref:odnb/20866. (subscription, Wikipedia Library access or UK public library membership required)
- Vaughn, Sally N. (1987). Anselm of Bec and Robert of Meulan: The Innocence of the Dove and the Wisdom of the Serpent. Berkeley, CA: University of California Press. ISBN 0-520-05674-4.

Catholic Church titles
Preceded by Leofric	Bishop of Exeter; 1072–1103	Succeeded by William Warelwast
