= Robert Warelwast =

12th-century Bishop of Exeter

- Bishop of Exeter
- Appointed: 10 April 1138
- Term ended: c. 28 March 1155
- Predecessor: William Warelwast
- Successor: Robert of Chichester

Orders
- Consecration: 18 December 1138 by Alberic

Personal details
- Died: c. 28 March 1155
- Buried: Exeter Cathedral
- Denomination: Catholic

Robert Warelwast (died 1155) was a medieval Bishop of Exeter.

== Life ==
Warelwast and his successor, Robert of Chichester are often confused. Warelwast was the nephew of the previous bishop, William Warelwast, and was appointed archdeacon of Exeter by his uncle. He had been educated at Laon, sent there by his uncle to study under Master Anselm of Laon.

Warelwast was nominated on 10 April 1138 at a royal council held at Northampton. Probably, he was elected by the cathedral chapter and his election was formally accepted by King Stephen of England at Northampton. He was consecrated on 18 December 1138 by the papal legate Alberic, because the archbishopric of Canterbury was vacant.

Warelwast went to the Lateran Council held by Pope Innocent II in 1139. During King Stephen's reign, he was forced to recognize Baldwin de Redvers as Earl of Cornwall, but continued to date his charters by Stephen's regnal years. He seems to have favored Stephen, but his diocese was not strategically significant in the civil war, and he was little bothered by the disorders of the reign. He did excommunicate Matilda's half-brother Reginald fitz Roy, whom she had made Earl of Cornwall, but this was because Richard had ravaged church lands.

Warelwast failed to attend the Council of Rheims in 1148, and was suspended from his bishopric by Pope Eugene III for this. Warelwast was a patron of Baldwin of Exeter, the future Archbishop of Canterbury, sending Baldwin to Italy to study canon law.

Warelwast died about 28 March 1155. He was still alive on 7 February 1155 when he oversaw the translation of relics at Launceston Priory, but died soon after that. He was buried in his cathedral.

== Citations ==
Catholic Church titles
Preceded by William Warelwast	Bishop of Exeter; 1138–1155	Succeeded by Robert of Chichester
