= Frances Patterson =

British judge (1954–2016)

Dame Frances Patterson DBE
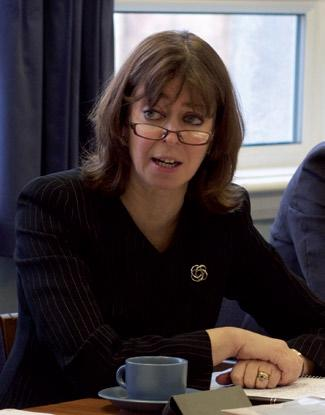
- Patterson in 2012

Justice of the High Court
- In office 2013–2016
- Monarch: Elizabeth II

Personal details
- Born: 29 November 1954 County Durham, England
- Died: 20 December 2016 (aged 62)
- Spouse: Graham Nicholson (m. 1980)
- Children: Oliver; Leo; Simon
- Education: University of Leicester

Dame Frances Silvia Patterson, DBE (29 November 1954 – 20 December 2016), styled The Hon. Mrs Justice Patterson, was a judge of the High Court of England and Wales.

Born in County Durham, Patterson was educated at The Queen's School, Chester and the University of Leicester.

Patterson was called to the bar at Middle Temple in 1977. Following a period as a Law Commissioner she was appointed to be a judge of the High Court of Justice (Queen's Bench Division) on 1 October 2013.

Patterson was appointed a Dame Commander of the Order of the British Empire on 18 February 2014.

Patterson was married to Dr. Graham Nicholson; they had three sons, Oliver, Leo and Simon. She died after a short illness on 20 December 2016, aged 62.
