= Wilfrid Westall =

Bishop of Crediton

Wilfrid Arthur Edmund Westall (20 November 1900 – 22 February 1982) was an English Anglican bishop in the 20th century. He served as the Archdeacon of Exeter and as a Bishop of Crediton (both in the Diocese of Exeter).

== Early life ==
Westall was born into a clerical family—his father was St Leger Westall (a priest); Wilfrid was a great-grandson of the artist William Westall ARA (1781–1850). He was educated at Merchant Taylors' School, an all-boys public school in the City of London. He went on to study theology at St Chad's College, Durham University, graduating with distinction.

== Career ==
Westall was ordained into the Church of England in 1925: Having been deaconed previously, he was priested on Trinity Sunday (7 June) by Ernest Barnes, Bishop of Birmingham, at Birmingham Cathedral. He was a curate in Birmingham and at the Church of the Good Shepherd, Brighton. In 1930, he was appointed Vicar of St Wilfrid's Church, Brighton. He further served as a Vicar at Hawnby and Shaldon. He was appointed Archdeacon of Exeter in 1951, and a Canon residentiary of Exeter Cathedral. Late in his life he wrote The Life of the Cathedral Church of Saint Peter in Exeter. On 18 October 1954, he was consecrated a bishop by Geoffrey Fisher, Archbishop of Canterbury, at Westminster Abbey, to serve as Bishop of Crediton (one of two suffragan bishops of the Diocese of Exeter). In 1958, he resigned as archdeacon and canon of Exeter to concentrate on his duties as Bishop. He retired on 29 June 1974.

For many years, he frequently appeared on the panel of the radio programme Any Questions?. He was keenly interested in railways and the nickname of "God's Wonderful Railway" for the Great Western Railway has been attributed to him.

== Lourdes ==
He led the first Anglican pilgrim to Lourdes in 1963, his group contains 48 people including: 1 bishop, 6 priests,1 deacon, 2 nuns, and 6 invalid children.

== Later life ==
He died on 22 February 1982, at the age of 81. A memorial service was held at Exeter Cathedral on 3 April 1982.

== Personal life ==
In 1927, Westall married Ruth Evans. Together they had four children; a son and three daughters.

Church of England titles
Preceded by William Surtees	Bishop of Crediton; 1954 – 1974	Succeeded by Philip Pasterfield
