= Huxley (surname) =

Huxley /ˈhʌksli/ is an English surname, originally given to people from Huxley, Cheshire. Notable people with the surname include:

- The British Huxley family:
  - Thomas Henry Huxley (1825–1895), British biologist, supporter of Charles Darwin and inventor of the term 'agnosticism'
  - Leonard Huxley (writer) (1860–1933), British writer and editor, son of Thomas Henry
  - Aldous Huxley (1894–1963), British writer, son of Leonard and author of Brave New World
  - Sir Julian Huxley (1887–1975), British biologist and author, son of Leonard
  - Sir Andrew Huxley (1917–2012), British physiologist and biophysicist, son of Leonard
  - Elspeth Huxley (1907–1997), British writer, granddaughter-in-law of Thomas
  - Sir Leonard Huxley (physicist) (1902–1988), Australian physicist, second cousin once-removed of Thomas Huxley
  - Anthony Julian Huxley (1920–1992), British botanist with the standard author abbreviation "Huxley"

== Others ==
- Hugh Huxley (1924–2013), British biologist, and Professor of Biology at Brandeis University
- Jonathan Huxley (born 1965), British artist
- Julian Huxley (rugby union) (born 1979), Australian rugby union footballer
- Martin Huxley (born 1944), British mathematician
- Parthenon Huxley (1956–2026), American musician, singer, songwriter and producer
- Rick Huxley (1940–2013), English musician

== People with the middle or given name ==
- Huxley Thompson (1872 – 1951), Church of England priest and author

=== Fictional ===
- Lenina Huxley, a character in the 1993 film Demolition Man
