= Henry Sanders (priest) =

Archdeacon of Exeter

Henry Sanders (1807–1888) was a Church of England priest, most notably Archdeacon of Exeter from 1875 until his death.

Sanders was born in Exeter and educated at Christ Church, Oxford, holding incumbencies in Langtree and Otterton. He was Head Master of Blundell's School in Tiverton from 1834; and Rector of Sowton from then until his death on 24 June 1888.
