= Charles Harper (colonial administrator) =

British civil servant

Sir Charles Harper KBE CMG (24 February 1876 – 13 May 1950) was a British colonial administrator.

== Biography ==
He was born in Barnstaple, Devon, England. He was educated at Blundell's School in Tiverton, and Exeter College, Oxford, and played rugby football for Oxford University and England.

In 1900, Harper entered the Colonial Service as a Cadet in the Gold Coast Civil Service and was attached to the Ashanti Field Force. He left the Gold Coast in 1909 when he was called to the Bar of the Inner Temple; the following year he married Marjorie Ford. Harper returned to the Gold Coast and in May 1914 was appointed Acting Colonial Secretary in Accra.

At the outbreak of World War I, he served as Senior Political Officer with the Togoland Field Force during the occupation of the former German colony, a post he held until December 1914. During 1916 he deputised for the Governor, Sir Hugh Clifford, during the latter's absence. The following year Harper proposed retiring from the Colonial Service in order to join the Army but the Colonial Office decided that he could not be released from his post in the Gold Coast.

In 1920 Harper was appointed Chief Commissioner of Ashanti. One of the most memorable events of Harper's career in Ashanti concerned the crisis that arose in 1921 when the Golden Stool of Ashanti, venerated by the Ashanti people as the symbol of the soul and spirit of their race, was discovered damaged and desecrated. Harper at once assembled the Chiefs and handed over to them the trial of the offenders, making it clear that the Government made no claim whatever to the Golden Stool. For his handling of this situation, he was awarded the CMG in 1921.

He was appointed an OBE in 1919 and knighted in 1930.

In 1925 Harper was appointed Governor and Commander-in-Chief of the island of St. Helena (1925–1932) and he served with the Ministry of Food from 1939 to 1941.

== Sources ==
- Obituary of Sir Charles Harper, The Times, Wednesday, 31 May 1950; pg. 6; Issue 51705; col E
