= Mount Huxley =

Mount Huxley is a name shared by a number of places:

- Mount Huxley (Alaska), a mountain peak in the Saint Elias Mountains
- Mount Huxley (Antarctica), a mountain in Antarctica
- Mount Huxley (California), a mountain in California
- Mount Huxley (New Zealand), a mountain in New Zealand
- Mount Huxley (Tasmania), a mountain in Australia
