= Huxley (lunar crater) =

Crater on the Moon

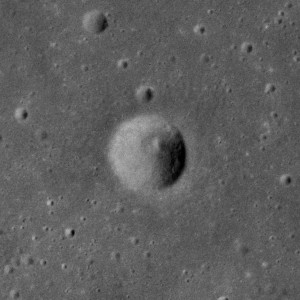
- Apollo 17 image
- Coordinates: 20.2°N 4.5°W
- Diameter: 3.48 km (2.16 mi)
- Depth: 0.55 km (0.34 mi)
- Colongitude: 5° at sunrise
- Eponym: Thomas H. Huxley

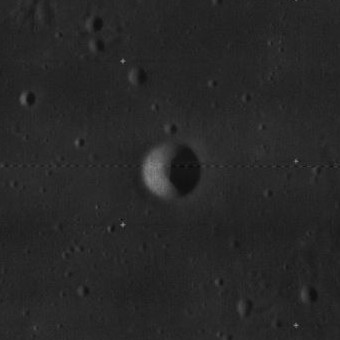
Lunar Orbiter 4 image

Huxley is a tiny lunar impact crater located in eastern inlet of Mare Imbrium, just to the north of the Montes Apenninus. It was named after British biologist Thomas Henry Huxley. To the southeast in this range is Mons Ampère. This crater was previously identified as Wallace B before being renamed by the IAU. The crater Wallace lies due west.

A previously undiscovered lunar dome was spotted near this crater in 2001.
