= John Moore-Stevens (priest) =

John Moore-Stevens was a Church of England priest, most notably Archdeacon of Exeter from 1820 until his death on 30 March 1865.

He was born in 1782 at Great Torrington, educated at Exeter College, Oxford, and held incumbencies in Langtree and Otterton.
