= William Surtees =

William Frederick Surtees (16 October 1871 – 23 March 1956) was an Anglican bishop. He was the second suffragan Bishop of Crediton from 1930 to 1954.

Surtees was educated at Bedford School and King's College, Cambridge. Ordained in 1900, he began his ecclesiastical career with a curacy in Lythe. He was then rector of Sampford Courtenay, vicar of St Simon's, Plymouth and Archdeacon of Exeter before a 24-year stint as Suffragan Bishop of Crediton. He died on 23 March 1956.

== Notes ==
Church of England titles
Preceded by Robert Edward Trefusis	Bishop of Crediton; 1930–1954	Succeeded by Wilfrid Arthur Edmund Westall
