= Christopher Futcher =

British Anglican priest (born 1958)

The Venerable Christopher Futcher
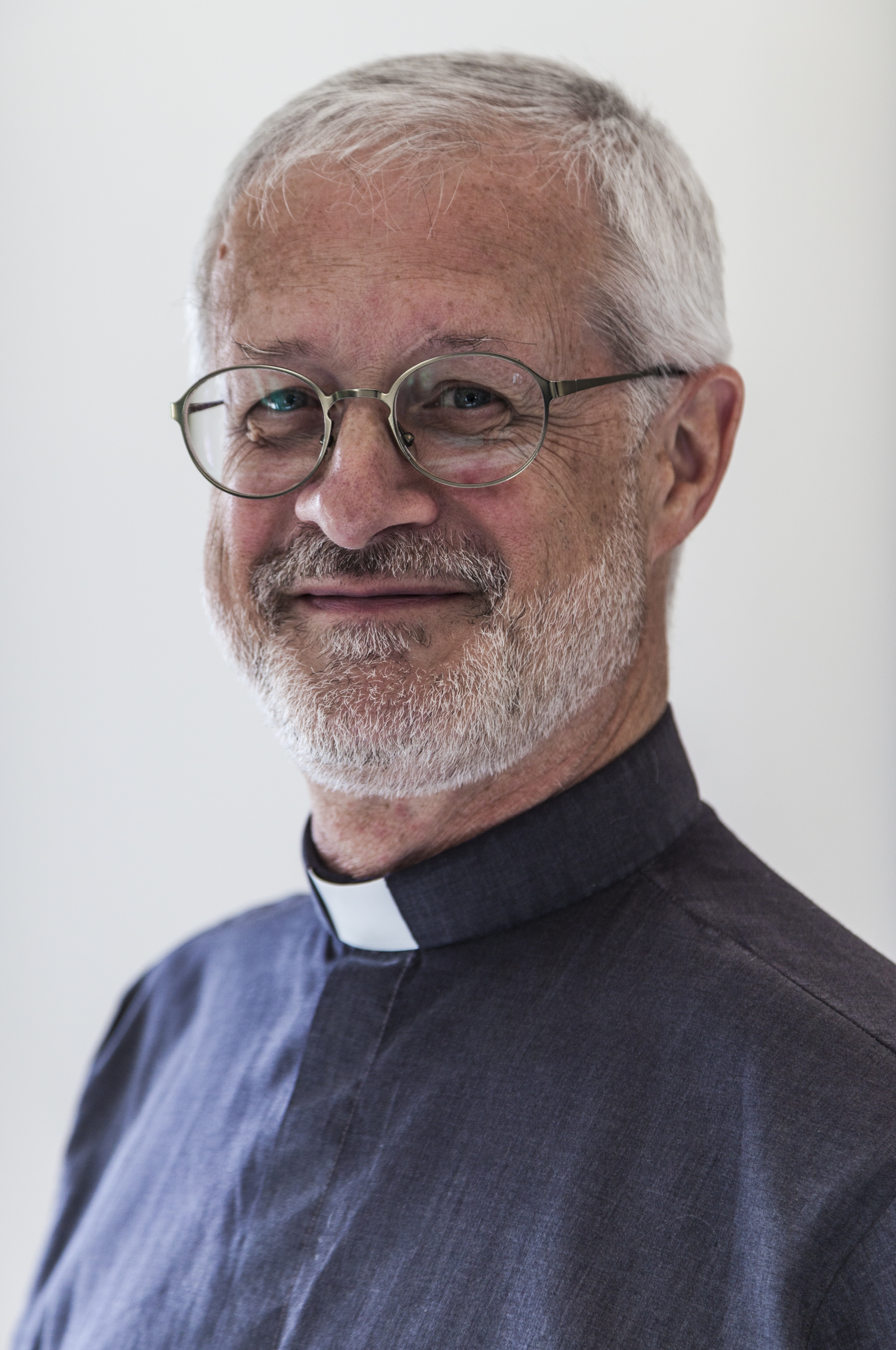
- Born: Christopher David Futcher; January 6, 1958 (age 68); Luton, England
- Spouse: Revd Anne Futcher
- Children: James and Charlotte
- Church: Church of England
- Ordained: 1982

Christopher David Futcher (born 1958) is a British Anglican priest who became Archdeacon in Cyprus on 7 September 2019; he had previously been Archdeacon of Exeter since 2012.

== Biography ==
Futcher was educated at Strode's Grammar School, the University of Edinburgh, Heythrop College, University of London, King's College London and Westcott House, Cambridge.

He was ordained deacon in 1982, and priest in 1983. After a curacy in Borehamwood he was Vicar of All Saints, Pin Green, then St Stephen, St Albans, and then rector of St Nicholas Church, Harpenden before going to Exeter. In September 2019 Futcher was collated as Archdeacon in Cyprus and licensed as the parish priest of St Helena's Church Larnaca in the Diocese of Cyprus and the Gulf. He is married to Anne, also a priest, and they have two adult children, James and Charlotte.
