= Ernest Sandford =

English cricketer

Ernest Grey Sandford (16 August 1839 – 8 March 1910) was an English first-class cricketer active in 1859 to 1861 who played for Oxford University in five matches. He was born in Dunchurch and died in Exmouth. He became a Church of England priest, most notably Archdeacon of Exeter from 1888 until his death.

Sandford was educated at Rugby and Christ Church, Oxford. He held incumbencies at Landkey and Cornwood.

Church of England titles
Preceded by Henry Sanders	Archdeacon of Exeter; 1888–1909	Succeeded by Frederick Sanders
