= Bartholomew of Exeter =

12th-century Bishop of Exeter

Bartholomew
- Bishop of Exeter
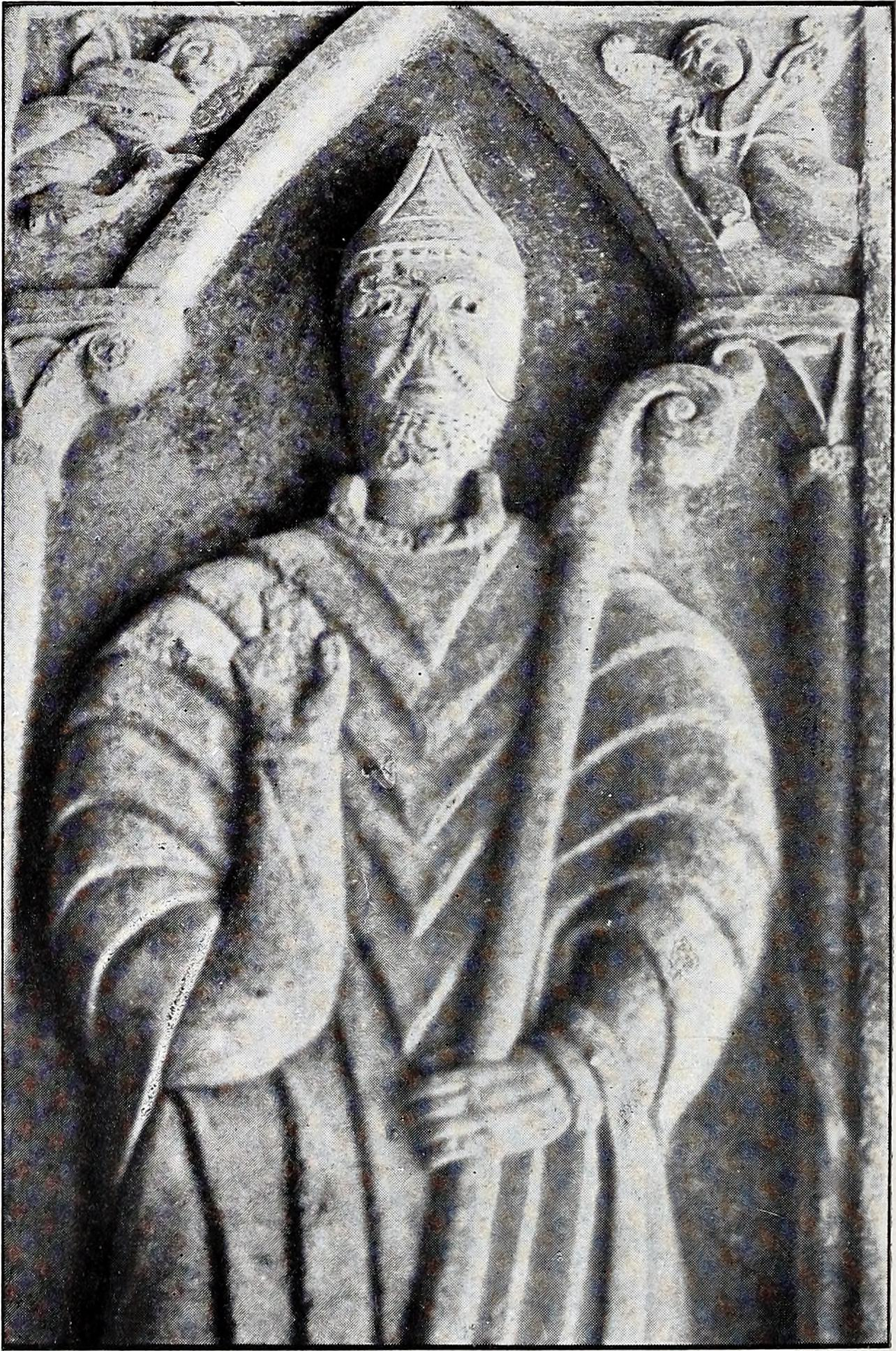
- Misericord image of Bartholomew from Exeter Cathedral
- Elected: before April 1161
- Term ended: 15 December 1184
- Predecessor: Robert of Chichester
- Successor: John the Chanter
- Other post: Archdeacon of Exeter

Orders
- Consecration: after 18 April 1161 by Walter

Personal details
- Died: 15 December 1184
- Buried: Exeter Cathedral (probably)
- Denomination: Catholic

Bartholomew of Exeter (died 1184) was a medieval Bishop of Exeter. He came from Normandy and after being a clerk of the Archbishop of Canterbury, was made Archdeacon of Exeter in 1155. He became Bishop of Exeter in 1161. Known for his knowledge of canon law, he was involved in the Becket controversy after the appointment of Thomas Becket as Archbishop of Canterbury. After Becket's death, although he was frequently at the royal court, he mainly attended to his diocese. A number of works by him survive, including sermons and treatises on law and theology.

== Early life ==
Bartholomew was a native of Normandy, and was probably born in Millières, a village in the Cotentin near Lessay and Périers. He was a clerk of Theobald of Bec, Archbishop of Canterbury before becoming Archdeacon of Exeter in 1155. He was a correspondent of John of Salisbury, as he and John had been clerks for Theobald along with Thomas Becket. Contemporaries considered Bartholomew an excellent theologian and canon lawyer. In 1159, Bartholomew took part in a synod held at London to decide between the rival claims of Popes Alexander III and Victor IV. At some point in his career, he taught at the law school at Paris.

== Election to Exeter ==
After the death of Robert of Chichester, the see of Exeter was vacant for a year before a local Gloucestershire family urged King Henry II of England to put forward one of their members as a candidate for the see. Henry did suggest the family member, Henry FitzHarding, to the cathedral chapter, but Archbishop Theobald objected that FitzHarding was unqualified. Instead, Theobald suggested Bartholomew, and eventually the king was persuaded and Bartholomew was elected. He was consecrated bishop after 18 April 1161, at Canterbury Cathedral by Walter, the Bishop of Rochester. Theobald had wished to consecrate Bartholomew himself before Theobald died, but could not because the king was abroad in Normandy and the bishop-elect had to swear fealty to the king before he could be consecrated. After his consecration, Bartholomew gave the archdeaconry of Exeter to the disappointed royal candidate.

== Time as bishop ==
During the Becket controversy between King Henry and Thomas Becket, the new Archbishop of Canterbury, Bartholomew refused to cooperate with either side, which caused the archbishop to scold him as a bad friend. At the start of the dispute, Bartholomew was sent with a royal deputation to Sens to ask the pope to send papal legates to England to settle the quarrel. Thereafter, he avoided being drawn into the controversy until 1170. When Roger of York crowned Henry the Young King later that year, Bartholomew was said to be present. In September 1170, Pope Alexander III suspended Bartholomew from office for attending the coronation, along with a number of other bishops. After Becket's murder in late 1170, John of Salisbury took refuge with Bartholomew until John was elected Bishop of Chartres in 1176. Shortly after a settlement of the dispute was reached in 1172, Henry wrote to Bartholomew saying that "I shall abolish all new customs introduced in my reign against the churches of my land (which I consider to be few or none)", which signaled Henry's intentions of mostly ignoring the settlement. Bartholomew was restored to his office before 21 December 1171, when he helped restore Canterbury Cathedral to use for religious ceremonies.

Early in his episcopate, Bartholomew attended Alexander III's council at Tours in 1163, along with a number of other English bishops. Bartholomew often acted as a judge-delegate for the papacy in cases that had been appealed to Rome. Alexander described Bartholomew, in company with Richard of Dover, another leading papal judge, as the "twin lights illuminating the English Church". In his diocese, Bartholomew is known to have visited the parishes, conducting a visitation to inquire into the management or mismanagement of church affairs. He also gave vestments and decorative objects to his cathedral church. After Becket's death, Bartholomew attended the royal court regularly between 1171 and 1179, but most of his efforts went towards administering his bishopric.

== Death and legacy ==
Bartholomew died on 15 December 1184, and was probably buried in Exeter Cathedral. A relief in Exeter has been identified as possibly Bartholomew's effigy for his tomb. A contemporary writer, Gerald of Wales, said that Bartholomew was better educated in Roman law than in canon law. The historian Austin Lane Poole said of him that he "kept out as much as possible out of secular politics, and used [his] learning and practical abilities whole-heartedly for the welfare of the church." During his bishopric, he advanced the career of Baldwin of Forde, as it was Bartholomew who made Baldwin archdeacon. He had two nephews, Jordan and Harold, who were part of his household while he was at Exeter.

At some point in his career, he wrote a Penitentiale, or penitential, which true to his canon lawyer training, quotes canon law extensively. This was based on the works of Ivo of Chartres, Burchard of Worms, Gratian, and Peter Lombard, among other authors. Besides his penitential, Bartholomew also wrote works on the doctrines of free will and predestination, entitled either De libero arbitrio or De fatalitate et fato, a collection of over a hundred sermons, and a work against Jews, entitled Dialogus contra Judaeos. So far, only the penitential has been printed. A sermon on the death of Becket by Bartholomew was seen by John Bale in the 16th century at Oxford, but it has not survived to the present.

== Citations ==
Catholic Church titles
Preceded by Robert of Chichester	Bishop of Exeter; 1161–1184	Succeeded by John the Chanter
