= The Queen's School, Chester =

The Queen's School
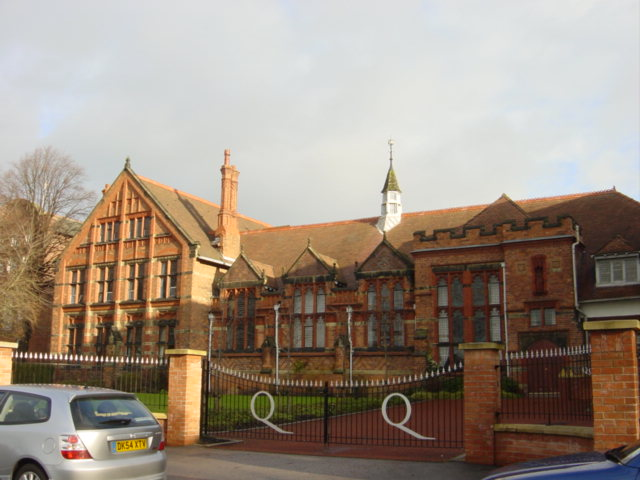

Location
- City Walls Road; Chester, Cheshire; England; 53.191°N 2.897°W

Information
- Type: Private day school
- Motto: Honour Wisdom
- Established: 1878
- Local authority: Cheshire West and Chester
- Chair of the Governors: Kirsty Whiteley
- Headmistress: Joanne Keville
- Gender: Girls
- Age: 3 to 18
- Enrolment: 514 (2020)
- Colour
- Former pupils: Queen's Alumni
- Website: http://www.thequeensschool.co.uk

The Queen's School is a private day school for girls aged 3–18 located in Chester, England. Founded in 1878 as "The Chester School for Girls", Queen Victoria, who was the school's first patron, issued a royal decree naming the school as "The Queen's School" in 1882, the only school in England to have this distinction. It is a member of the Girls' Schools Association.

== History ==
Founded in 1878 by a group of prominent Chester citizens as The Chester School for Girls, the school owes its royal name to Queen Victoria. In response to a request from the Duke of Westminster, an early benefactor of the school, in 1882 she commanded "that the School in question shall be styled the Queen's School".

The school originally had its home at 100 Watergate Flags, an 18th-century house built upon the site of an extramural Roman bathhouse.

Once again, the Duke of Westminster supported the school by offering the trustees a piece of land which had once been the site of Chester's City Gaol and House of Correction, together with a gift of £500 towards the building of a new school. In 1886 Margaret Sandford became the headteacher. She extended the curriculum including languages, mathematics, chemistry, gymnastics, and a novel approach to art developed by Robert Aplett in Bradford. Her family were concerned about women's rights. Sandford was open to women being involved in the administration of education but she was opposed to women gaining the right to vote. In 1895 she had a public debate with Millicent Fawcett on the question. She was the head until she died in 1903.

The site, right on the city walls of Chester became the home of the school's senior pupils. More recently, further buildings have been constructed or acquired, so that the school inhabits a mixture of Georgian and Victorian buildings as well as modern ones.

The Queen's Lower School was originally based in two large Victorian houses in Liverpool Road. It still occupies this site but has expanded in recent years.

== Curriculum ==
Girls are taught a range of subjects including languages, mathematics, the sciences (separately), technology, the humanities, PE and the creative arts. All pupils from Reception learn three languages and in Year 7 are required to learn Spanish and Mandarin Chinese and may choose a language of their choice from those two or French the following year.

The Queen's School regularly appears in league tables as one of the region's top independent schools based on examination results.

The Queen's Lower School was one of three independent schools in Cheshire to be named in The Sunday Times' top 100 schools for 2011 based on SAT results.

The 2011 ISI inspection rated both the Lower School and Senior School curriculum as "excellent" in all areas.

The Queen's School is the only independent school in the north of England to be recognised and designated "Confucius Classroom" status by Hanban for excellence in teaching Mandarin Chinese.

== Extracurricular ==
The school has a number of orchestras, bands, ensembles and choirs and organises regular musical and dramatic productions. The school hosts the Chester Youth Symphony Orchestra once a week. The Lower School Young Voices choir has been semi-finalists for the past three years in the BBC Songs of Praise School Choir of the Year competition, reaching the final in 2015.

Competitive sports played include hockey, lacrosse, netball, swimming, rowing, skiing, gymnastics, equestrian, badminton and athletics. Hockey, netball and swimming teams range from U10s to U18s, others for Senior School only. The school's hockey players are regularly placed as county champions or higher across a range of age groups. The Lower School team were North of England Champions in 2013 and the U14 Team were placed in the top 9 in the UK in 2016.

Both the Lower and Senior School Swimming Teams reached the National Finals in 2015.

The school's Fitness For All strategy aims to increase participation in sport by girls through offering a wide variety of non-competitive sports.

== Notable alumnae ==
- Diana Beck, the world's first female neurosurgeon
- Ann Clwyd, Welsh Labour Party politician
- Elsie Conway, phycologist and one of the few female fellows of the Royal Society of Edinburgh.
- Vivienne Faull, Bishop of Bristol and only female cathedral provost in Church of England history
- Matilda Freeman, actress
- Dame Louise Makin, businesswoman
- Frances Patterson judge of the High Court of England and Wales.
- Beth Tweddle, Olympic gymnast and three times Olympian
- Gemma Owen Love Island star

== See also ==
- Grade II listed buildings in Chester (central)
