= Ælfwald =

Ælfwald (also Alfwald or Aelfwald or Elfwald) may refer to:

- King Ælfwald I of Northumbria (died 788)
- King Ælfwald II of Northumbria (fl. 806–808)
- King Ælfwald of Sussex (fl. 765, 772)
- King Ælfwald of East Anglia (died 749)
- Ælfwold I (bishop of Crediton) (died 972)
- Ælfwold II (bishop of Crediton) (died before the period between 1011 and 1015)
- Ælfwold III (bishop of Crediton) (died between 1011 and 1015)
- Ælfwold I (bishop of Sherborne) (died 978)
- Ælfwold II (bishop of Sherborne) (died 1058)
