= Dover Grammar School for Boys =

Location
- Astor Avenue; Dover, Kent, CT17 0DQ; England; 51.128670°N 1.290470°E

Information
- Type: Foundation grammar school
- Motto: Fiat lux (Let there be light); Genesis 1:3
- Established: 1905
- Founder: Fred Whitehouse
- Local authority: Kent
- Department for Education URN: 118931 Tables
- Chair of the Governors: Sue King
- Headmaster: Philip Horstrup
- Staff: 72 (2024-2025)
- Gender: Male (11-16); mixed (16-18)
- Age: 11 to 18
- Enrollment: 795 (2017-2018)
- Capacity: 800 (2017-2018)
- Houses: Castle, Channel, Port, Priory, Pharos
- Former pupils: Old Pharosians
- Website: www.dovergramboys.kent.sch.uk

Dover Grammar School for Boys (DGSB) is a selective secondary school located in Dover, United Kingdom, whose origins can be traced back to the Education Act 1902 (the 'Balfour Act'). Originally founded as the Dover County School for Boys and Girls with locations behind the Dover Town Hall and on Priory Hill, the co-educational arrangements were early on prohibited by the Kent Education Committee. Dover Grammar School for Boys now occupies a prominent position overlooking the town of Dover on Astor Avenue. Its sister school is located in Frith Road and known as the Dover Grammar School for Girls (DGSG).

== History ==
=== The Dover County School for Boys (1905–1931) ===
The Education Act 1902 (the Balfour Act) laid the path to formal secondary education for 'able pupils' throughout the United Kingdom. In 1903 Frederick (Fred) Whitehouse M.A. (Oxon.) was appointed Dover's Director of Further Education and oversaw the transition of the local municipal school and School of Art into the new Dover County School for Boys and Girls which was formally founded in 1905. Initially, the boys' premises were in Ladywell and the girls' on Priory Hill, on the site of the private St. Hilda's School, whose headteacher was persuaded to become Head of the Girls' Department of the County School.

Increasing numbers at both schools led to wrangling between the Board of Education, Kent County Council, and the Dover Corporation. Although Fred Whitehouse and the Dover Borough preferred a co-educational arrangement, the Kent Education Committee and Board of Education insisted on separate schools. A new site for the Boys' school was eventually found in Frith Road and plans agreed in 1913. Despite the outbreak of war, building on the new premises commenced and the school moved there in October 1916.

Numbers at the School were ever-increasing and by the end of WWI there were 230 boys in the Senior school in Frith road and 77 in the Junior school on Priory Hill.

=== The 'School on the Hill' and WWII (1931–1945) ===
Despite the severe economic circumstances of the depression, Whitehouse persuaded the authorities to provide the funds for a new building in Astor Avenue.

Whitehouse believed in the maxim often attributed to Winston Churchill that "we shape our buildings and our buildings shape us" and, architecturally, the school mixes both gothic and classical influences.

Opened by the Duke of York in 1931, the future King George VI of the United Kingdom, DGSB is one of few state school in Britain to have a working organ, which is housed in the Great Hall and leaves for Hamburg every 25 years for expert care and maintenance.

During World War II, the school building was requisitioned and used by the Royal Navy as a station for WRNS with pupils and staff evacuated to Ebbw Vale in south Wales.

A notable feature of the school building is a large stained glass window showing St. George and bearing the names of past students of the school who fell in World War Two with a separate memorial to students in World War One.

=== Post-war developments (1946–present) ===
Following funding cost pressures, in 1991, the school established a joint sixth form with Dover Grammar School for Girls (DGSG) which continues to this day.

In 1994, the school became Grant Maintained after warding off a series of reorganisation proposals from Kent County Council including a relocation to the ex-Castlemount School Site in 1990 as well as the amalgamation of the 2 grammar schools to a new modern construct in Whitfield in 1993.

In 2000, a second tower was erected that differed from the design of the existing tower (known as the Old Tower to pupils) to provide additional access to IT rooms built over the school workshops.

In 2006, as a result of its specialist status as a Business and Enterprise College, the school received additional funding from the government, part of which was invested into a new Business & Enterprise suite.

In 2008 there were new proposals to move the school to Whitfield to be housed in a new building under the Labour government's Building Schools for the Future programme but this was cancelled after the 2010 General Election by Education Secretary Michael Gove.

In 2019, plans were drawn to demolish the existing buildings and erect a new modern school on the adjacent playing fields with completion originally set for 2022. Kier was appointed in August 2020 by The Department for Education (DfE) to construct the new facilities for the school. Erection of the steel skeleton for the main building was completed by Mifflin Construction in mid-2021. The building was opened to students in spring 2022 with the whole project being completed in summer 2023.

== Combined Cadet Force ==
The school also has a Combined Cadet Force (CCF) which is open to anyone from Year 8 upwards.

== House system ==
The School has operated a 'house system' since the First World War to the present time. On entry to the school pupils are allocated to a 'house' to which they owe allegiance throughout the entirety of their school career. These 'houses' primarily compete against one another in inter-house competitions. For example, in cross-country, athletics, cricket, football, or swimming.

The original four houses at the school were established in 1915, given colours (red, dark blue, light blue, and green), and named after their respective captains.

From 1915 to 1919, the houses were Street's (red), Costelloe's (dark blue), Chase's (light blue), Bromley's (green). In 1919, the house names were changed to reflect different areas of Dover District in which the boys lived: Maxton (red), Buckland (dark blue), Town (light blue), Country (green).

After the Second World War and the return of the School from Ebbw Vale, the house names were changed again. The old names were no longer relevant for the altered demographic situation of the town so the new houses were renamed to reflect the different locations occupied by the School (Park Street, Priory Hill, Frith Road, and Astor Avenue). Thus, in 1949, the names became Astor (Red), Frith (Dark Blue), Priory (Light Blue), Park (Green).

In the early 1990s, the house names were changed again to reflect areas around the town and to create a stronger association with local heritage. These names were Castle (Red), Channel (Green), Port (Blue), Priory (Yellow)

In 2019 a fifth house was added to the four house system, Pharos, represented by the colour white. Meaning the current house names are Castle (Red), Channel (Green), Pharos (White), Port (Blue), Priory (Yellow). .

== Admissions ==
The school is selective and, in order to gain entry, the prospective student must first pass the 11+ examination, informally known as the "Kent Test". Alternatively they can pass the schools in-house 'Grammar Test', which is administered by the School.

== Headteachers ==
- Mr Frederick Whitehouse MA (Oxon), (1910–1936)
- Mr John C Booth MA (Oxon), (1936–1960)
- Dr Michael G Hinton MA (Oxon), PhD (London), (1960–1968)
- Mr TS Walker BSc (Manchester), (1968–1969)
- Mr Reginald C Colman MA (Oxon) OBE, (1969–1992)
- Mr Neil A Slater MA (Cantab), (1992–2002)
- Mrs Julia Bell BA (UEA), PGCE (London), (2002–2003)
- Mrs Sally Lees MA (Oxon), (2003–2010)
- Dr Richard Moxham BA, PhD (Manchester), (2010–2014)
- Mrs Sonette Schwartz BEd (Pretoria), (Interim)
- Mrs Fiona Chapman BSc, (2014–2018)
- Mr Philip Horstrup BA (Southampton), (2018 -)

== Notable former pupils and staff ==
Former pupils are known as "Old Pharosians". The term is derived from the Latin word pharos ('lighthouse'), and refers to the famous lighthouse at Dubris built by the Romans shortly after the Claudian invasion of Britain, c. 46 CE.

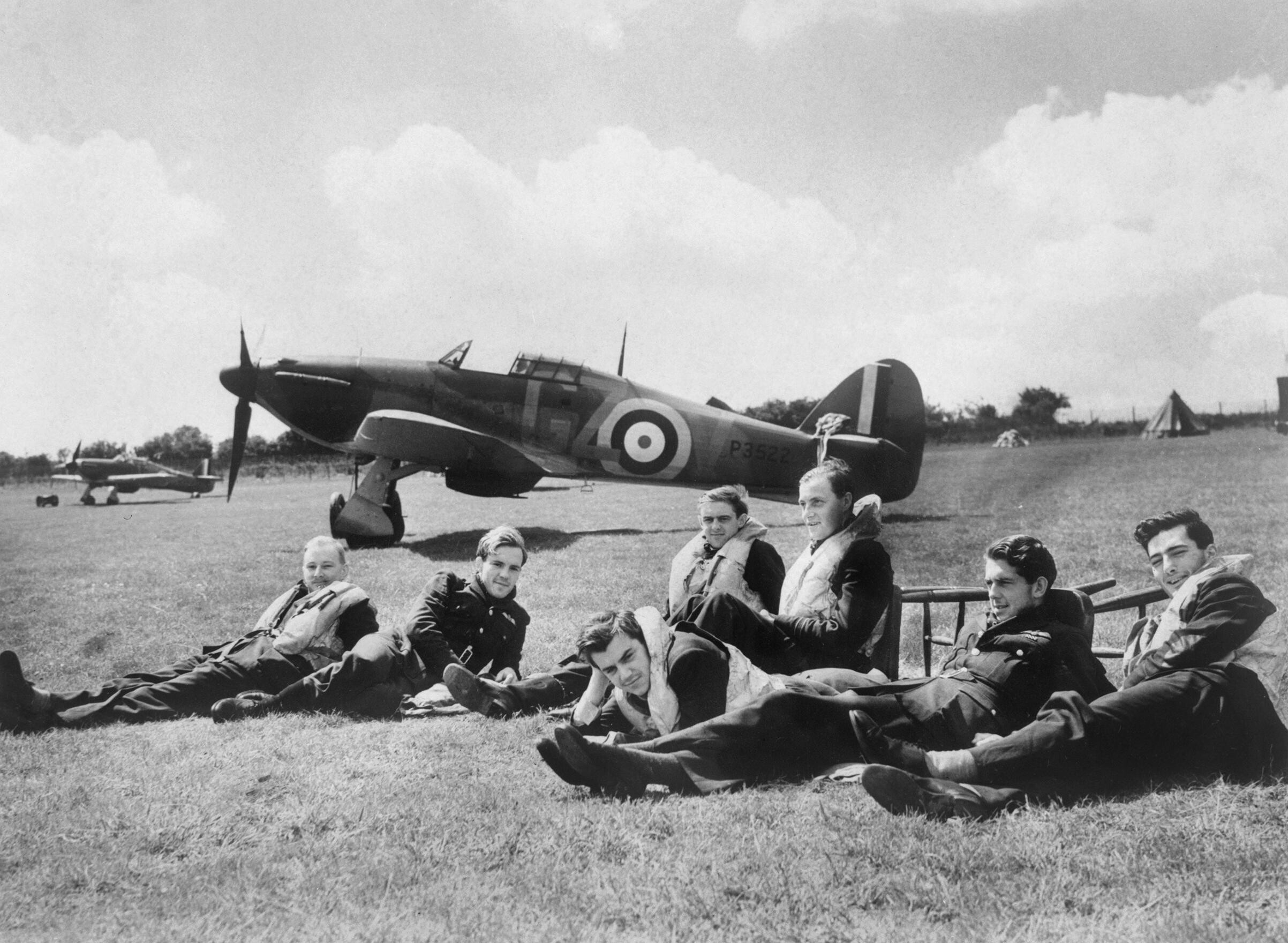
Pilot Officer Keith Gillman (second from the left), on 29 July 1940 at RAF Hawkinge

=== Military ===
- Major Ronald Bromley (1929–1936?), MC, British army officer, 9th Survey Regiment RA (9 SR). Awarded the MC.
- Major-General Eric Cole (1919–1923), OBE, CBE, CB, Royal Corps of Signals, first-class cricketer and amateur boxer
- Major General Reverend Coles Alexander Osborne (1907–1910), CIE, Director of Military Operations, GHQ, India, Commander of Kohat District.

=== Politics, civil service, and the law ===
- Professor Anthony Wilfred Bradley (1945–1952), QC, British barrister, known for expertise in UK constitutional law, social security, and human rights, Professor of Law at the University of Edinburgh.
- Francis Arthur Cockfield (1924–1933), Baron Cockfield, President of the Royal Statistical Society from 1968 to 1969, and Secretary of State for Trade from 1982 to 1983, European Commission 1984-88
- Sir William Fittall (1964–1972), private secretary to the Home Secretary (1985–1987) and Secretary of State for Northern Ireland (1992–1993). Secretary General of the Archbishops’ Council and General Synod (2002–2015)
- Sir Walter Robert (Robin) Haydon (1929–1937), British Ambassador to the Republic of Ireland, High Commissioner to Malawi and to Malta
- Antony Hook (1991–1998), barrister and Member of the European Parliament
- Sir Clifford George Jarrett (1920–1928), KBE, CB, Permanent Secretary and Lord Commissioner of the Admiralty, Permanent Secretary of the Department of Health and Social Security
- Sir John Frank Mummery (1949–1957), Lord Justice Mummery, a judge in the Court of Appeal

=== Business ===
- Bob Grigg (1924–2002), aircraft designer with de Havilland in Hertfordshire
- Herbert Loebl (1938–1939), OBE, British businessman, philanthropist, co-founder of Joyce, Loebl & co., a manufacturer of scientific instruments

=== Charitable works ===
- Lester Borley (1942–1949), CBE, director of the National Trust for Scotland.

=== Religion ===
- Rev. Edward Francis (1940–1942), Archdeacon of Bromley.
- Rev. Dr. Michael Hinton (1960–1968), former headmaster and author of the 100-Minute Bible
- Rt. Rev. Eric Mercer, Bishop of Birkenhead from 1965 to 1973 and Bishop of Exeter from 1973 to 1985
- Rt. Rev. Kenneth Newing, Bishop of Plymouth from 1982 to 1989

=== Academics and scholars ===
- Professor Bruce Bilby (1931–1940), professor of the theory of materials at the University of Sheffield from 1966 to 1984
- Professor John Clyde Binfield (1951–1958), OBE, FSA, professor of history at Sheffield University
- George William Coopland (1905–1907?), professor of medieval history, University of Liverpool. 'The Grand Old Man of English Medieval History'.
- David William Cornelius (1947–1953), MBE, forester and philanthropist
- Professor Kenneth William Donald (1920–1930), OBE, DSC, FRCP, FRCPE, physician, surgeon, pulmonologist, cardiologist, professor of medicine, and leading expert on underwater physiology and exercise physiology
- Professor Colin Malcolm Donald (1920–1926), FAAS, professor of agriculture, University of Adelaide
- Professor Henry Garland (1917?–1926), professor of German, University of Exeter
- Professor Cecil Augustus Hart (1914–1919), CMG, professor of surveying and photogrammetry at London, vice chancellor of Roorkee University, India; Rector and Principal of the Nigerian College of Arts, Sciences and Technology; Director of the London Master Builders’ Association
- Professor Arthur F. Holmes (1935–1941), professor of philosophy, Wheaton College
- Ian Charles Jarvie (1949–1955), professor of philosophy, member of the Royal Society of Canada
- Sir James Menter (1932–1939), FRS, FRMS, president of the Institute of Physics from 1970 to 1972, and principal of Queen Mary College, London from 1976 to 1986
- Professor Robert Miles (1961–1968?), professor of sociology and international studies at the University of North Carolina, Chapel Hill, Associate Dean for Study Abroad and International Exchange
- Professor Jonathan Philip Parry (1968–1975), professor of modern British history at the University of Cambridge
- Herbert Schofield (1912–1915), MC, senior physics master and principal of the Technical Institute at Ladywell. A distinguished physicist.
- Professor Robert Spicer (1961–1969), professor of Earth sciences at the Open University and visiting professor at the Chinese Academy of Sciences, Xishuangbanna Tropical Botanical Garden, Yunnan, China
- Professor David Thomas (1970–1977), professor of geography at the University of Oxford since 2004
- Eric Trist (1921–1925), psychologist, researcher, and teacher, especially in the field of organisational development
- R. J. Unstead (1926–1934), a prolific author of history books for children
- Professor Ian Watt (1924–1935), literary critic, literary historian and professor of English at Stanford University
- Professor Jonathan Wright (1973–1980), William Atwood Hilton Professor of Zoology and professor of biology at Pomona College

=== Sports ===
- Derek Aslett (1969–1976), first-class cricketer
- James Brown (2009–14), professional footballer
- Matthew Carley (1996–2003), international Rugby Union referee
- David 'Dave' Carr, footballer played for Luton, Lincoln, and Torquay.
- Patrick Croskerry, international oarsman (Canada). Competed at the 1976 Summer Olympics.
- Eddie Crush (1928–1936), first-class cricketer
- Richard Davey (1976–1983), international open water swimmer, English Channel World Record 1988 (F-E)
- David Elleray (1966–1973), MBE, football referee
- Chris Penn (1974–1981), first-class cricketer
- Hugh Styles (1985–1991), sailing World and European medallist, represented Great Britain at the 2000 Sydney Olympic Games, international sailing coach
- Brigadier William Michael Edward White (1924–1932), first-class cricketer.

=== The arts ===
- Nick 'Topper' Headon (1967–1973), drummer with The Clash

== Bibliography ==
- Ruffell, K. (1987) The Dover County School 1905-1931. Dover.
- Ruffell, K. and D. Weaver (eds.) (1982) Fifty Years On. 1931-1981. Dover, Dover Grammar School for Boys.
- Webster, M. (2020) 'Dover Grammar School for Boys (Dover County School for Boys)' The Dover Society. Newsletter 97 (March), pp. 38–41
