= Exon (disambiguation) =

Exon may refer to:

- Exon, a region of DNA that is represented in the mature form of RNA
- Exoribonuclease or ExoN, an RNA degrading enzyme
- Exoniensis or Exon., the Post-Nominal Letters for alumni / degrees from the University of Exeter
- Exon can also refer to the signature of the Bishop of Exeter
- J. James Exon (1921–2005), American politician
- Nat Exon (born 1992), Australian rules footballer
- Exon is a rank for an officer in the Yeomen of the Guard

It may also be a spelling error for:

- ExxonMobil, the energy company
- Exxon, a brand of fuel sold by ExxonMobil
