= Sideman (disambiguation) =

A sideman is a musician who performs live with a band of which they are not a permanent member.

The Sidemen is a British YouTube group.

Sideman or Sidemen may also refer to:

- Sidemen, Bali, a district in the Karangasem Regency of Bali
- Sideman (bishop), a 10th-century Bishop of Crediton, modern Exeter
- Side Man, a play by Warren Leight, finalist for the 1999 Pulitzer Prize for Drama

== See also ==
- Sidesman, a term related to churches
