= David Urquhart (bishop) =

Scottish C of E bishop

The Right Reverend David Urquhart KCMG
- Bishop of Birmingham
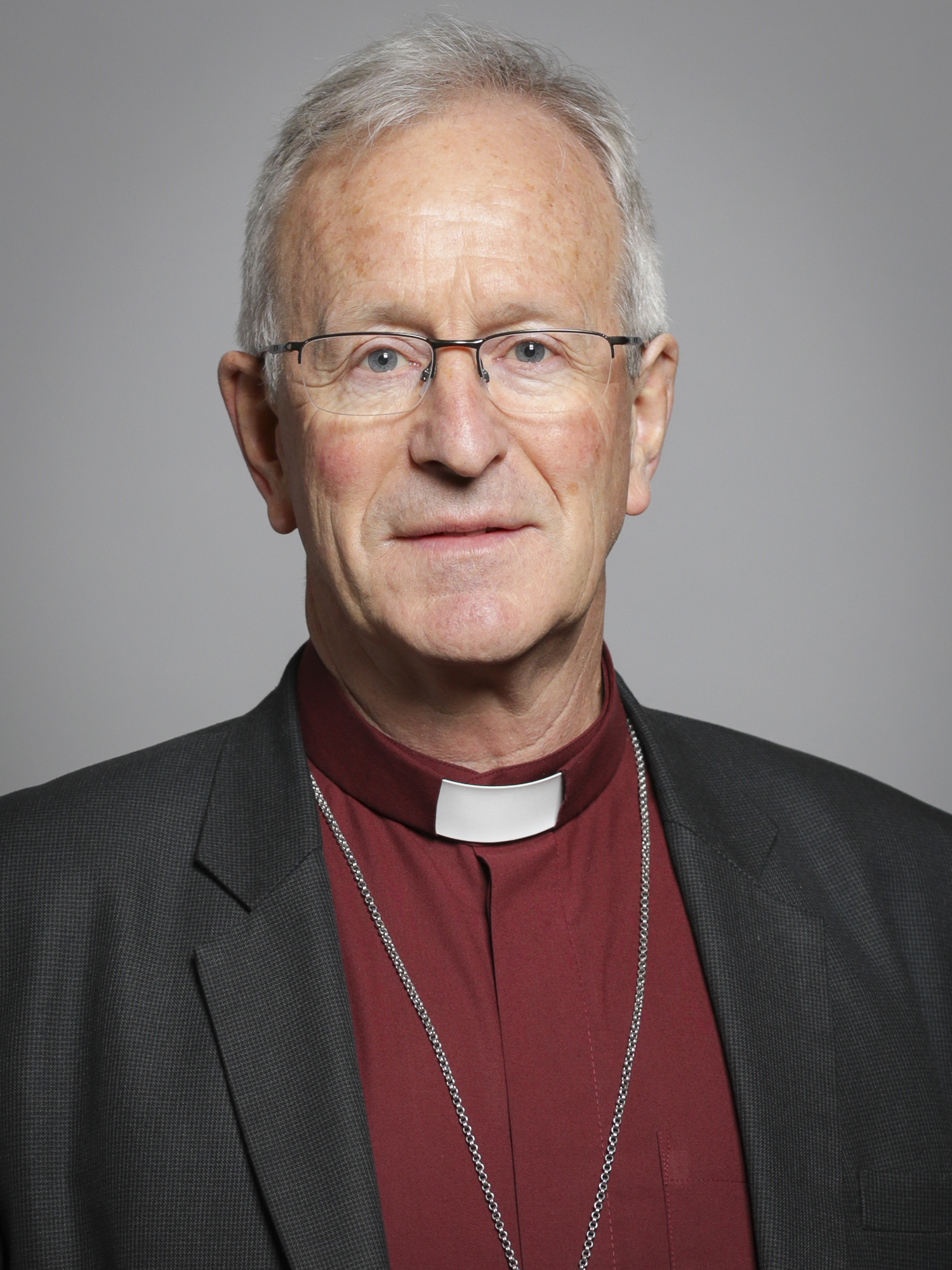
- Diocese: Birmingham
- In office: 2006–2022
- Predecessor: John Sentamu
- Other posts: Bishop of Birkenhead (2000–2006); Convenor of the Lords Spiritual (18 May 2015 – 18 October 2022); Bishop to the Archbishops of Canterbury and York (ad interim, 2023–present)

Orders
- Ordination: 1984 (deacon); 1985 (priest) by John Habgood
- Consecration: 2000

Personal details
- Born: 14 April 1952 (age 74) Scotland
- Denomination: Anglicanism
- Residence: Bishop's Croft, Harborne, Birmingham, England
- Profession: formerly commercial management
- Education: Ealing Technical College Business School, Rugby School

Convenor of the Lords Spiritual
- In office 18 May 2015 – 18 October 2022
- Preceded by: Tim Stevens
- Succeeded by: Alan Smith

Member of the House of Lords
- Lord Spiritual
- Bishop of Birmingham; 26 October 2010 – 18 October 2022

David Andrew Urquhart KCMG (born 14 April 1952) is a retired Scottish bishop. He served as the ninth Bishop of Birmingham in the Church of England.

== Early life ==
Urquhart was educated at Croftinloan School, a private school near Pitlochry, and at Rugby School, then an all-boys public school.

His first career was in commercial management with British Petroleum before studying at Ealing Technical College Business School where he received a Bachelor of Arts degree in business studies in 1977. From 1982 to 1984, he trained for the ordained ministry at Wycliffe Hall, Oxford, an evangelical Anglican theological college.

== Church career ==
Urquhart was ordained a deacon at Petertide on 1 July 1984 by John Habgood, Archbishop of York, at York Minster. He became a priest the next year, and served in Hull before becoming the vicar of Holy Trinity Church, Coventry in 1992. For his last year in Coventry, he was an honorary canon of the cathedral.

Urquhart was appointed suffragan Bishop of Birkenhead in the Diocese of Chester in 2000. He acts as the Archbishop of Canterbury's envoy to China and accompanied him on a visit to China in October 2006. Urquhart was appointed Prelate of the Order of St Michael and St George in 2005 and holds the Freedom of the Borough of Wirral.

His appointment as Bishop of Birmingham was announced in 2006 and he was enthroned on 17 November 2006, succeeding John Sentamu after Sentamu's appointment as Archbishop of York. Around 800 people attended his enthronement in Birmingham Cathedral. Urquhart was introduced as a Lord Spiritual to the House of Lords on 26 October 2010. He became the Convenor of the Lords Spiritual on 18 May 2015. In the 2018 Queen's Birthday Honours, was appointed Knight Commander of the Order of Saint Michael and Saint George (KCMG) for services to international relation; as a clergyman, he does not use the title sir.

In April 2022, it was announced that he would be retiring as Bishop of Birmingham on 18 October 2022. On 2 February 2023, it was announced that Urquhart would become Bishop to the Archbishops (i.e. right-hand bishop to the Archbishops of Canterbury and of York) for a one-year interim period starting during the week beginning 6 February 2023.

== Inauguration ==
At his enthronement Urquhart was presented with a cope which incorporated various images related to his life and the city of Birmingham. These included a bagpiper, signifying his birth and upbringing in Scotland, a motorcycle which represents one of his hobbies and the emblems of Aston Villa and Birmingham City, the two most prominent football teams from the city. The cope also features a passage from the Bible, which reads "You shall be called the repairer of the breach, the restorer of the streets to dwell in." (Isaiah 58:12). The passage was written in English, Mandarin, Hebrew and Luganda. During the ceremony in Birmingham Cathedral, Urquhart smashed a large clay pot with a mallet to signify the fragility of human life and our world.

In a message to his new diocese shortly after his enthronement, Urquhart thanked the people of Birmingham for the warm welcome he had received. He cited his desire for the diocese to engage in "worship, making disciples and prophetic witness".

== Poverty ==
Urquhart has worked successfully with representatives of several political parties in who lead Birmingham City Council, in an effort to fight poverty and social exclusion.

Inequality and social exclusion is something that we should not easily accept in a rich country and a city like ours. Our aim is to bridge the gap between the disadvantaged and the powerful, so that more people can participate in the economic and social opportunities at work, home and play.

== Safeguarding controversy ==
In December 2018, Urquhart was cited in an independent review of the ten-year handling of an abuse case in the Birmingham diocese. The report, seen by Channel 4, found the church "fell short on a number of basic standards of complaint handling” and delivered damning findings about the Bishop of Birmingham's response in 2011. It said he “lacked adequate knowledge of safeguarding and the capacity to manage the process". The survivor claimed she had been warned by an unnamed bishop not to talk to the media as it wouldn't be “very godly”. She was also forced to sign a non-disclosure agreement before seeing the review into her own case. Urquhart apologised to her and her husband “for the upset and anguish that you both have suffered as a result of the mistakes I have made in the handling of your complaint”.

== Styles ==
- The Reverend David Urquhart (1984–1999)
- The Reverend Canon David Urquhart (1999–2000)
- The Right Reverend David Urquhart (2000–2018)
- The Right Reverend David Urquhart KCMG (2018–present)

Church of England titles
| Preceded by Michael Langrish | Bishop of Birkenhead; 2000–2006 | Succeeded by Keith Sinclair |
| Preceded by John Sentamu | Bishop of Birmingham; 2006–2022 | Succeeded by Michael Volland |
Other offices
| Preceded by Tim Stevens; The Lord Bishop of Leicester | Convenor of the Lords Spiritual; 2015–2022 | Succeeded by Alan Smith; The Lord Bishop of St Albans |
