= Anthony Bradley =

Anthony or Tony Bradley may refer to:

- Anthony B. Bradley, American author and professor of religion
- Anthony W. Bradley (1934–2021), British lawyer
- Tony Bradley (basketball) (born 1998), American basketball player
- Tony Bevilacqua (born 1976), Tony Bradley while with The Distillers
