= Ronald Brown (bishop) =

British bishop (1926–2019)

The Rt Revd Ronald Brown BA(Hons)
- Bishop of Birkenhead
- Diocese: Diocese of Chester
- In office: 1974–1992
- Predecessor: Eric Mercer
- Successor: Michael Langrish
- Other post: Honorary assistant bishop in Liverpool (1992–2003)

Orders
- Ordination: c. 1952 (deacon); c. 1953 (priest)
- Consecration: 1 May 1974

Personal details
- Born: 7 August 1926
- Died: 13 June 2019 (aged 92)
- Denomination: Anglican
- Parents: Fred & Ellen
- Spouse: Joyce Hymers (m. 1951; d. 1987)
- Children: 1 son; 1 daughter
- Profession: Writer
- Education: Durham University

Ronald Brown (7 August 1926 – 13 June 2019) was the Suffragan Bishop of Birkenhead from 1974 until 1992.

Brown was educated at Durham University. After a curacy at St Laurence Chorley he was vicar of Whittle-le-Woods. Following this he was vicar of St Thomas', Halliwell, Bolton and then (his final appointment before his ordination to the episcopate) rural dean of Ashton-under-Lyne. In retirement he continued to serve as an assistant bishop in the Diocese of Liverpool until 2003. Brown returned to live in Chester and died in June 2019 at the age of 92.

Church of England titles
Preceded by Eric Mercer	Bishop of Birkenhead; 1974–1992	Succeeded by Michael Langrish
