= Eadnoth (disambiguation) =

Eadnoth is an Old English masculine name, which may refer to:

- Eadnoth the Younger, abbot of Ramsey (c. 992 — 1007 x 1009) and bishop of Dorchester (1007 x 1009 — 1016)
- Eadnoth II, bishop of Dorchester (1034 — 1049)
- Eadnoth of Crediton, Bishop of Crediton (fl. early 11th century)
- Eadnoth the Constable, held 30 holdings in Devon, Dorset, Somerset and Wiltshire before the Norman conquest
