= John Woolton =

Bishop of Exeter from 1579 to 1594

John Woolton (or Wolton) (1535? – 13 March 1594) served as Bishop of Exeter in Devon, England, from 1579 to 1594.

== Origins ==
He was born at Whalley, Lancashire in about 1535, the son of John Woolton of Wigan, by his wife Isabella Nowell, a daughter of John Nowell of Read Hall near Whalley, and sister of Alexander Nowell (c. 1517 – 13 February 1602), Protestant theologian and Dean of St Paul's.

== Career ==
He was admitted as a student of Brasenose College, Oxford, on 26 October 1553, when aged about 18, and supplicated for the degree of B.A. on 26 April 1555. Soon afterwards he left for Germany with his uncle Alexander Nowell and remained abroad until the accession of Queen Elizabeth I in 1558. On 25 April 1560 he was ordained a deacon by Edmund Grindal, Bishop of London, and he proceeded to priest on 4 June 1560.

Woolton found patrons in William Alley, Bishop of Exeter, and Francis Russell, 2nd Earl of Bedford, Lord Lieutenant of Devon (1584-5). He was appointed to the rectory of Sampford Peverell (16 August 1561), to the rectory of Whimple, the vicarage of Braunton (4 May 1570), and to the rectory of Kenn (15 October 1573), all in Devon. A canonry at Exeter was conferred on him in March 1565; he read a divinity lecture there twice a week and preached twice every Sunday, and during the plague in the city during the summer of 1570 he attended the sick.

By the new charter, dated 28 July 1578, Woolton, probably through his uncle's influence, was constituted the first warden of the collegiate church of Manchester. On 11 October in that year Bridget, Countess of Bedford, recommended him to Lord Burghley as a fitting person to fill the vacant bishopric of Exeter. He was duly appointed to the see, supplicated for the degrees of B.D. and D.D. at Oxford on 26 May 1579, and was consecrated in the archiepiscopal chapel at Croydon on 2 August 1579. As the bishopric had become of small value, Woolton was allowed to hold with it the place of archpriest at Haccombe in Devon (20 October 1581) and the rectory of Lezant in Cornwall (1584).

Woolton remodelled the statutes at Exeter Cathedral. In 1581 he deprived Anthony Randal, parson of Lydford, a follower of the Family of Love, and made others who had accepted the Family's doctrines recant in the cathedral. Many strong accusations, some amounting to fraudulent misgovernment, were made against his running of the diocese to the archbishop of Canterbury in 1585. His answers to the charges were satisfactory, though he was obliged to admit his comparative poverty, and that he had placed his son in jail.

== Land purchases ==
In 1593 he purchased from the Brett family the estates of Pilland, Upcott, Beara and Cladovin all in the parish of Pilton in North Devon. His son Dr John Woolton and his grandson, Anthony Woolton, lived at Pilland until about 1637.

== Marriage and children ==
He married and had a large family, leaving progeny including:

- John Woolton, M.A., eldest son, a fellow of All Souls' College, Oxford, who erected a monument to his father's memory in Exeter Cathedral. He retired from practice at Exeter to the estate of Pilland in the parish of Pilton, North Devon, which his father had purchased.
- (daughter), who married Francis Godwin, successively Bishop of Llandaff and Bishop of Hereford.
- Alice Woolton, who married William Sharpe of Tiverton in Devon, 3rd son of Robert Sharpe, a merchant in the City of London, by his wife Jeliane Mallory, eldest daughter and co-heiress of Sir Richard Mallory, Lord Mayor of London in 1564.

== Death and burial ==
He died on 13 March 1594 at the Bishop's Palace, Exeter, and was buried on 20 March in Exeter Cathedral, on the south side of the choir, where survives his chest tomb with inscribed black marble slab on top. Another monument in his memory, erected by his eldest son, survives very high up on a wall of the north transept.

== Works ==
Woolton was author of the following theological treatises:

- An Armour of Proofs, 1576.
- A Treatise of the Immortalitie of the Soule, 1578.
- The Christian Manuell, 1576; reprinted by the Parker Society, 1851.
- The Castell of Christians and Fortresse of the Faithfull, n.d. [1577]: the dedication is to Francis Walsingham.
- A new Anatomie of the whole Man, 1576.
- Of the Conscience: a Discourse, 1570.
- David's Chain.

== Arms ==
Coat of arms of John Woolton
Escutcheon Or, a lion rampant supporting a saltier engrailed humetté gules.

Church of England titles
Preceded by William Bradbridge	Bishop of Exeter; 1579–1594	Succeeded by Gervase Babington
