= Victor Alexander Gascoyne-Cecil =

British Army officer (1891–1977)

Lieutenant-Colonel Victor Alexander Gascoyne-Cecil (21 May 1891 – 17 January 1977) was a British soldier.

The son of a Bishop of Exeter, Lord William Cecil and Lady Florence Mary Bootle-Wilbraham, and the grandson of a prime minister, the Marquess of Salisbury, he was educated at Westminster School and the Royal Military College, Sandhurst.

He joined the Hampshire Regiment during the First World War, was promoted to major in the Tank Corps, and was twice wounded. In October 1917 he took out a patent on a water heater. After the war, Gascoyne-Cecil's regiment was posted to British India. In 1922, he fought on the North-West Frontier with Afghanistan. When the Second World War broke out in 1939, his regimental battalion was recalled.

On 25 November 1915, Gascoyne-Cecil married Fairlie Estelle Caroline, elder daughter of Lieutenant Colonel Arthur Watson of the Suffolk Regiment. They had two sons, Rupert Arthur Victor Gascoyne-Cecil (1917– 2004) and Anthony Robert Gascoyne-Cecil (1921–1998).

In 1949, Gascoyne-Cecil was appointed High Sheriff of Essex. He was also a Deputy Lieutenant for Essex from 1951 to 1968.
