= Robert Miles (sociologist) =

British sociologist

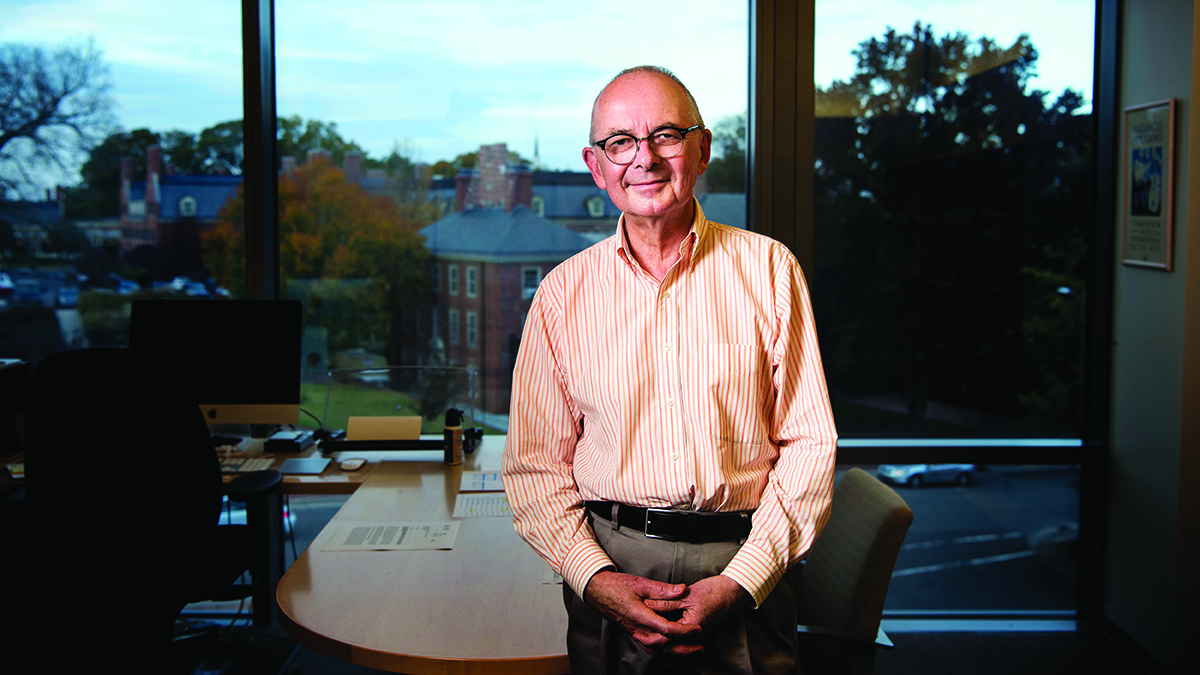
Robert Miles on April 14, 2014. Picture taken on campus at UNC Chapel Hill.

Robert Miles, also known as Bob Miles, is a British sociologist. Miles has worked as a professor of sociology at University of Glasgow and University of North Carolina at Chapel Hill.

== Early life ==
Miles was educated at Dover Grammar School for Boys. He graduated with a Bachelor of Science in sociology from the University of Bath in 1973. In 1986, he completed his PhD from the University of Glasgow.

== Career ==
After completing his bachelor's degree in 1973, Robert Miles developed his research career as a professor and researcher at the University of Bristol until 1978. He worked at the SSRC Research Unit on Ethnic Relations directed by Michael Banton. He joined the University of Glasgow in 1978, where he obtained his PhD and worked as a lecturer until 2000. From 1992 to 1997, Miles was a visiting professor at Glasgow Caledonian University. At the University of Glasgow, he was Associate Dean for the Faculty of Social Sciences from 1997 to 2000 and head of the Department of Sociology from 1993 to 1999.

Miles left Scotland in 2000 to become the first full-time director of the Study Abroad Program at the University of North Carolina at Chapel Hill. He served as program director until 2017, and built the program up to offer more than 330 programs in 70 countries. In 2017, he retired from his position.

== Research background ==
Robert Miles's research background can be traced back to the resurgence in the 1960s and 1970s of theoretical Marxism. His academic work developed as a critique of latent racism in the UK after the Second World War. In a contemporary period to the academic work of Miles, many authors still held analytical presuppositions based on race relations as an explanatory principle of racism based on the ideas of Robert Ezra Park, Max Weber and Michael Banton. During the period in which Miles developed his ideas (1970s–1980s), both he and other sociologists opposed to the analysis based on race relations. In those decades British sociology held an extensive debate between the race relations used analytically by Michael Banton, and the ideas about social conflict used by the scholar John Rex.

Between 1973 and the early 1980s, and understanding that the only way to analyse racism was to move away from the paradigm of race relations, Robert Miles was one of the most prolific authors publishing research on the form of racism after World War II. During this time Miles collaborated specially with the author Annie Phizacklea (or Anne-Marie Phizacklea), a sociologist at the University of Warwick (Coventry, UK).

In addition to Miles and Phizacklea, other authors who reacted against the race relations' orientation included Ambalavaner Sivanandan and members of the Centre for Contemporary Cultural Studies, such as Stuart Hall, Paul Gilroy, and John Solomos from the Department of Sociology at the University of Warwick.

== Work ==
Robert Miles' work focused on the nature of the different forms of existing modern racism, the distinct ideological formations of British, English, Welsh, Scottish and Irish nationalisms, their multiple intersections, and as well as in their formation as nation-state within the broader European context. Miles' intellectual trajectory is also known for his critique of classical racial theories, which he claims particularly ignore the role of labour migration in the processes of racialisation within the capitalist economic system.

=== Migrant labour ===
In 1982, his book Racism and Migrant Labour was published and reviewed by notable journals. Miles sees labour migration as a necessity of capitalism, as the labour market of this economic system develops alternatives to continue to deploy exploitation, and thus allow the accumulation of wealth of the non-proletarian classes to continue to be exponential.

=== Unfree labour ===
Miles' reflections on the problems concerning capitalism were developed in his doctoral thesis Anomaly or Necessity: Capitalism and Unfree Labour. This doctoral dissertation was published as a book in 1987 as Capitalism and Unfree Labor: Anomaly or Necessity? (originally titled Anomaly or Necessity: Capitalism and Unfree Labor). In this work, Miles suggests that capitalism develops contradictions, such as the existence of unfree labour, despite being based on trade and production. Miles maintains that since the seventeenth century, guest workers with limited mobility, slaves, and contract labourers have increased exponentially in the capitalist countries of Western Europe.

== Bibliography ==
=== Books ===
- Miles, Robert (1982). Racism and migrant labour. London: Routledge & Kegan Paul. ISBN 978-0710092120.
- Miles, Robert; Phizacklea, Annie (1984). White Man's Country: Racism in British Politics. London: Pluto Press. ISBN 9780861047659.
- Miles, Robert (1987). Capitalism and Unfree Labour: Anomaly or Necessity?. London: Routledge. ISBN 978-0422792509.
- Miles, Robert (1993). Racism after 'Race Relations'. London: Routledge. ISBN 9780415100342.
- Miles, Robert; Brown, Malcolm (2003) [First published in 1989 by Robert Miles]. Racism (2nd ed.). London: Routledge. ISBN 9780861047659.

=== Papers ===
- Miles, Robert; Phizacklea, Annie (1977). "Class, race ethnicity and political action". Political Studies. 25 (4). Wiley: 491–507. doi:10.1111/j.1467-9248.1977.tb00461.x. eISSN 1467-9248. S2CID 144780121.
- Miles, Robert; Phizacklea, Annie (1977). "Black workers, and New Commonwealth immigration, 1954-1973". Working Papers on Ethnic Relations. 6. S.S.R.C. Research Unit on Ethnic Relations, University of Bristol. eISSN 0309-6394.
- Miles, Robert; Phizacklea, Annie (1978). "The TUC and black workers 1974–1976". British Journal of Industrial Relations. 16 (2). Wiley: 195–207. doi:10.1111/j.1467-8543.1978.tb00279.x. eISSN 1467-8543.
