= William Bradbridge =

English bishop of Exeter (1501–1578)

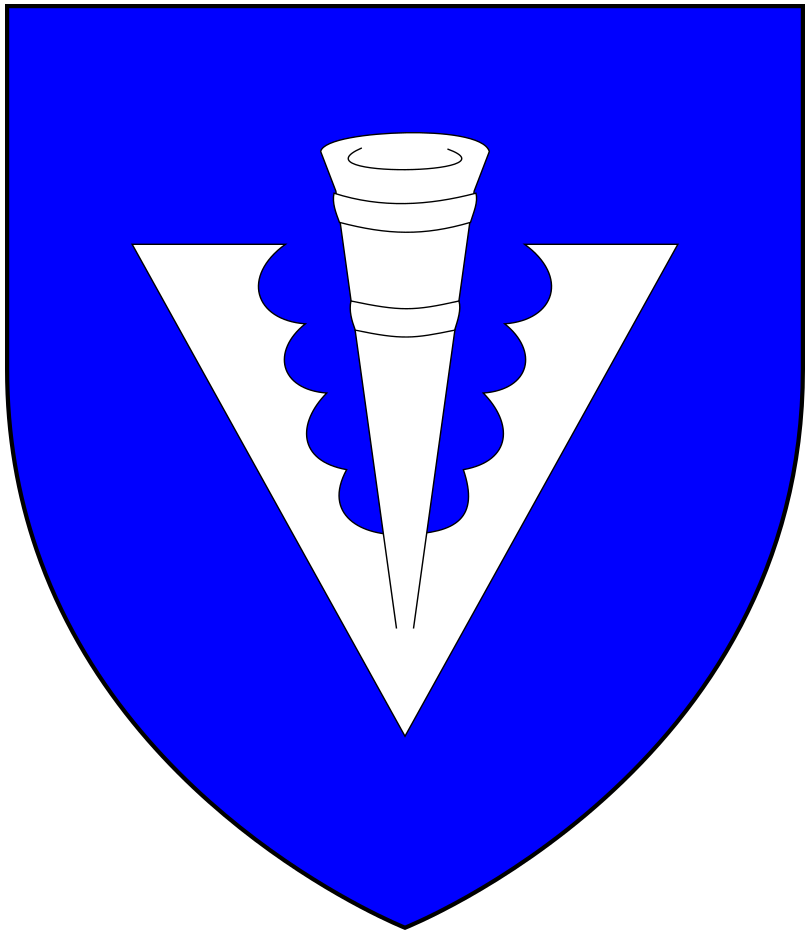
Arms of William Bradbridge: Azure, a pheon argent

William Bradbridge (or Brodebridge) (1501–1578) was an English bishop of Exeter.

== Life ==
He was born in London and took his B.A. degree at Magdalen College, Oxford, on 15 July 1528. In 1529 he became a fellow of his college, M.A. on 6 June 1532, B.D. on 17 June 1539. On 26 March 1565 he supplicated the university for a D.D. degree, but was not admitted.

He was a Protestant, but remained in post in the reign of Queen Mary. In 1555, on the presentation of Ralph Henslow, he was appointed prebendary of Lyme and Halstock, Sarum. He was also a canon of Chichester, and in 1561 a dispensation was granted him on account of this as regarded part of his term of residence at Salisbury. He subscribed the articles as a member of the lower house of the convocation of 1563, and when the reformist "six articles" of the same year were debated there, in common with other exiles, he signed them, but was outvoted by a majority of one. He also subscribed the articles of 1571.

Bradbridge was collated to be chancellor of Chichester on 28 April 1562, and was allowed to hold the chancellorship in commendam with his bishopric. On Low Sunday 1563 he gave the annual Spittal sermon, and on 23 June of the same year, allowing himself conformable to the discipline which was then being established, was elected dean of Salisbury by letters from Queen Elizabeth, in the place of the Italian Peter Vannes. Here he was a contemporary of John Foxe and Thomas Harding. From 1568 to 1576 he was the prebendary of Horningsham at Heytesbury, Wiltshire.

On 26 February 1571 the queen issued her significavit in his favour to the archbishop, and he was duly elected bishop of Exeter on 1 March. After a declaration of the queen's supremacy and doing homage, the temporalities of the see were restored to him on the 14th. His election was confirmed the next day, and he was consecrated at Lambeth on the 18th by Archbishop Matthew Parker and Bishops Robert Horne and Nicholas Bullingham.

More of a scholar than an administrator, he was given the Pentateuch to translate in 1572 for the new edition of the Bishop's Bible, according to John Strype. He had trouble with Catholics and dissenters, and sent three Cornishmen who refused to attend church to the London authorities. His commissary Dr. Tremayn headed a party against him, but the bishop withstood him, and had Lord Burghley block a proposed commission in the diocese. He also asked Cecil in 1578 if he could return to Salisbury. He resided mostly at Newton Ferrers, Devon, and died suddenly there alone, at noon on 27 June 1578, aged 77. He was indebted to the queen in the amount of £1,400 for tenths and subsidies received in her behalf from the clergy, so that immediately after his death she seized all his goods. He was buried in Exeter Cathedral, on the north side of the choir near the altar, under a plain altar tomb.

Church of England titles
Preceded by William Alleyn	Bishop of Exeter; 1571–1578	Succeeded by John Woolton
