= Hewlett Thompson =

British Anglican bishop (1929–2025)

The Right Reverend Hewlett Thompson
- Bishop of Exeter
- Church: Church of England
- Diocese: Diocese of Exeter
- In office: 1985 to 1999
- Predecessor: Eric Mercer
- Successor: Michael Langrish
- Other post: Honorary assistant bishop in Carlisle (1999–2025)
- Previous post: Bishop of Willesden (1974–1985; area bishop 1979–1985)

Orders
- Ordination: 1954 (deacon); 1955 (priest)
- Consecration: 24 January 1974

Personal details
- Born: 14 August 1929
- Died: 13 May 2025 (aged 95)
- Denomination: Anglican
- Spouse: Joy (m. 1954)
- Children: 4
- Education: Trinity Hall, Cambridge

Geoffrey Hewlett Thompson (14 August 1929 – 13 May 2025) was a British Anglican bishop. He served as Bishop of Exeter in the Church of England 1985 to 1999, having previously been a suffragan and area bishop in the Diocese of London.

== Early life and education ==
Thompson was born on 14 August 1929 in Hove, Sussex, England. He was educated at Aldenham School. He undertook his National Service in the Queen's Own Royal West Kent Regiment from 1948 to 1949. He was commissioned in the British Army as a second lieutenant on 25 September 1948. He relinquished his commission on 11 August 1954. He studied history and theology at Trinity Hall, Cambridge, graduating with a Bachelor of Arts (BA) degree in 1952. He then trained for ordination at Cuddesdon College from 1952 to 1954.

== Ordained ministry ==
Thompson was made a deacon on Trinity Sunday 1954 (13 June) and ordained a priest the next Trinity Sunday (5 June 1955) — both times by Spencer Leeson, Bishop of Peterborough, at Peterborough Cathedral. He began his ordained ministry as a curate at St Matthew's, Northampton. After which, he was first vicar of St Augustine, Wisbech and subsequently of St Saviour's Church, Folkestone.

He was consecrated to the episcopate by Michael Ramsey, Archbishop of Canterbury, at Westminster Abbey on 24 January 1974. He became Bishop of Willesden in 1974, one of the suffragan bishops of the Diocese of London. He became an area bishop upon the foundation of the London area scheme in 1979. In 1985, he translated to be the diocesan Bishop of Exeter. In 1992, he was one of the bishops who voted in support of the ordination of women as priests in the Church of England. He also supported ecumenical efforts and was pro-reform on issues of human sexuality, but was "unconvinced" of allowing the remarriage of divorcees in church. In retirement he was an honorary assistant bishop in the Diocese of Carlisle, where he lived at Warcop.

Having qualified by seniority of the Church of England's diocesan bishops in December 1989, he was introduced to the House of Lords on 21 February 1990. He was an infrequent contributor to the Lords, having never spoken 14 times in debates between his maiden speech on 13 February 1991 and his retirement as the Bishop of Exeter in 1999.

== Personal life ==
In 1954, he married Elisabeth Joy Fausitt. Together they had two sons and two daughters.

Thompson died on 13 May 2025, at the age of 95.
