= Charles Curzon =

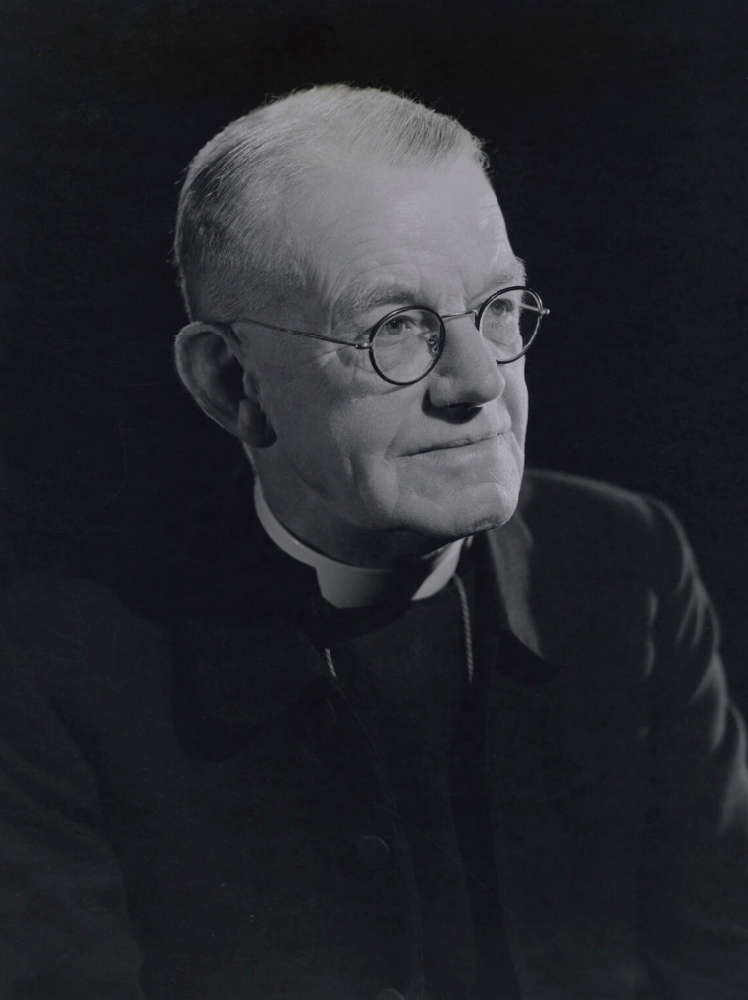
Charles Curzon, 1947

Charles Edward Curzon (15 April 1878, in Kensington – 1954) was an Anglican bishop, the 6th Bishop of Stepney from 1928 until 1936 when he was appointed Bishop of Exeter.

He educated at Lancaster Royal Grammar School and Christ's College, Cambridge. He embarked on an ecclesiastical career with a curacy at West Kensington. Incumbencies at Sheffield St Oswald's and Goole followed before elevation to the Suffragan Bishopric of Bishop of Stepney in 1928, a post he held until promotion to the Exeter See in 1936.

== Notes ==
Church of England titles
Preceded by Henry Mosley	Bishop of Stepney; 1928–1936	Succeeded by Robert Hamilton Moberly
Preceded by Lord William Gascoyne-Cecil	Bishop of Exeter; 1936–1948	Succeeded by Robert Cecil Mortimer
