= James Turberville =

English Roman Catholic bishop

The Right Reverend James Turberville
- Bishop of Exeter
- Church: Roman Catholic
- Appointed: 21 June 1555
- Term ended: 1559
- Predecessor: John Vesey
- Successor: William Alleyn

Orders
- Consecration: 8 September 1555 by Edmund Bonner

Personal details
- Born: 1494 Bere Regis, Dorset, England
- Died: c. 1570
- Coat of arms

Arms of Turberville: Ermine, a lion rampant gules crowned or

James Turberville (1494 – c. 1570) was an English cleric who served as Bishop of Exeter from 1555 to 1559.

== Origins ==
Born on or before Christmas Day in 1494, probably at Bere Regis in Dorset, he was the second surviving son of John Turberville (1471–1536) and his wife Isabel, daughter of John Cheverell. The Turbervilles were a gentry family who for centuries had held estates in Dorset and surrounding counties. His great-uncle John Turberville had served as Sheriff of Dorset in 1486, as had his grandfather John Cheverell in 1471. His younger sister Mary married the Dorset MP Leonard Willoughby.

== Education ==
Admitted at age 12 to Winchester College in 1507, he became a scholar of New College, Oxford in 1512 and a fellow in 1514, graduating with a BA in 1516 and an MA in 1520. From 1521 to 1524 he was employed in legal business with the Registrar of the University of Oxford, qualifying as a notary. Ordained priest in 1525, he then studied theology in Europe, gaining a DD that was recognised by Oxford in 1532. Resigning his fellowship in 1529, he left the academic world for a pastoral career.

== Early career ==
Appointed rector of Woodmancote in Sussex in 1529, he subsequently added the rectories of Owermoigne in 1532 and Lytchett Matravers in 1536, both in his native Dorset. In 1538 he was granted a canonry of Chichester Cathedral in Sussex as prebendary of Wittering, a post which traditionally carried the duty of delivering theological lectures. He also became rector of Hartfield in Sussex in 1541, and in 1549 was appointed a canon and prebendary of Winchester Cathedral in Hampshire. Apart from Woodmancote, which he had resigned by 1535, he occupied all these posts simultaneously until appointed as a bishop.

== Episcopacy ==
On becoming Queen in 1553, Mary I set about purging Protestant influence from the church and the country. Church leaders were appointed to lead their flocks back to Catholicism. On 11 March 1555, Turberville was nominated as bishop of Exeter by the crown and, after approval by the Pope, consecrated on or about 8 September 1555. His diocese, which at that time consisted of the counties of Devon and Cornwall, was a conservative area that had not widely embraced Protestantism. There were few married clergy to eject, but he did seek the return of diocesan estates seized by Henry VIII, regaining Crediton in 1556 (of which he then let part to his nephew Nicholas, son of his elder brother George). His contemporary at Exeter, the Protestant scholar John Hooker, wrote that he was a 'gentleman born ..., very gentle and courteous .... but most zealous in the Romish religion' and though not personally 'cruel nor bloody' was nevertheless in post when Agnes Prest from the hamlet of Northcott was burned alive at Exeter in 1557 or, as several sources say, 1558. According to Thomas Fuller, the sentence was due more to the diocesan chancellor, Blackstone, than to the bishop, and this was the only execution for heresy during his episcopacy. In November 1558, Queen Mary died and was succeeded by her Protestant sister, Queen Elizabeth. When legislation to remove Catholicism from England came before the House of Lords, in which Turberville sat as a bishop, he voted against it. After he refused to take the oath of supremacy to the queen, he was deprived of his bishopric in August 1559.

== Later life ==
As he continued to oppose the new ecclesiastical regime, in June 1560 he was imprisoned in the Tower of London. Pressure from Ferdinand I, Holy Roman Emperor, uncle of Mary's husband, secured his release into the custody of Edmund Grindal, bishop of London. In January 1565 the Privy Council approved Grindal's request that Turberville be freed, provided he stayed in London and made himself available when required. Later that year, the privy council ordered all former Catholic bishops back into the Tower. He died about 1570, whether free or not is unrecorded.

Church of England titles
Preceded by John Vesey	Bishop of Exeter; 1555–1559	Succeeded by William Alleyn
