= Herbert Loebl =

British businessman

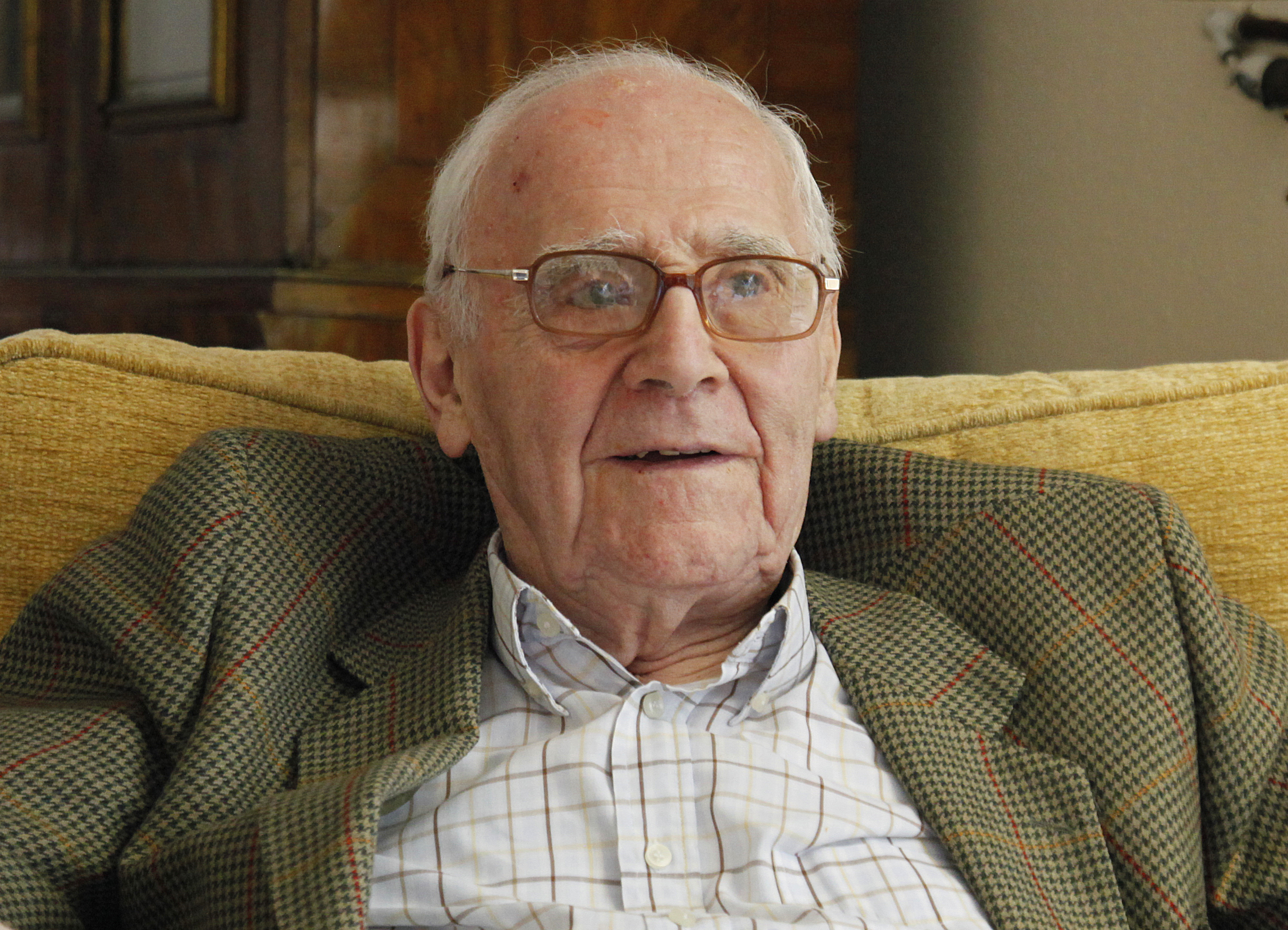
- Dr Loebl in June 2012
- Born: 18 April 1923; Bamberg, Bavaria, Germany
- Died: 28 January 2013 (aged 89); Newcastle, Tyne and Wear, United Kingdom
- Occupation: Businessman
- Children: 3
- Awards: OBE

Dr Herbert Loebl, OBE (18 April 1923 – 28 January 2013) was a British businessman, philanthropist and leading proponent of exporting, notable as a co-founder of Joyce, Loebl & Company, a manufacturer of scientific instruments.

== Early life ==
Herbert Loebl was born in Bamberg in Germany, into a prominent local Jewish family. With the rise of the Nazi party in Germany, the Loebl family fled persecution to the United Kingdom in late 1938 where he attended Dover Grammar School for Boys in Kent. He studied electrical engineering at King's College, Newcastle where he graduated in 1949.

== Joyce, Loebl & Company Ltd ==
During his time at King's College, Loebl met Captain Robert Joyce. In 1951, the two went into business producing scientific equipment with only £200 of capital. Joyce, Loebl & Co. exported over 70 percent of its products and at the time of its sale to Technical Operations Inc. (Tech/Ops), an American company, it was one of the major employers in north-eastern England with some 500 workers. It is estimated that the company also spawned 45 other businesses in the region. Some of the most significant products developed by Joyce, Loebl & Co were the optical microdensitometer used to visualise the properties of DNA and other organic compounds, and the MecoLab, a system of routine blood-panel analysis for hospitals.

As of 2013 there existed four companies which had grown out of the original Joyce, Loebl & Company Ltd: Loebl Ltd, Sevcon Ltd, Applied Imaging Ltd, and Phasor Ltd. (Sevcon Ltd were taken over by Borg Warner in 2017)

== Philanthropy ==
A donation made by Hebert Loebl was used to set up a section of the business school of Newcastle University, focussed on the promotion of exports, which is named the Herbert Loebl Export Academy in his honour.

== Awards ==
Loebl was awarded the Order of the British Empire in 1973 for services to exports. He was also awarded the Citizen's Medal of the city of Bamberg in 1996, the Order of Merit of the Federal Republic of Germany (1997) and the Bavarian Order of Merit in 2001. In 2003, he was awarded an honorary doctorate of science by the University of Newcastle. In 2010, he was given a lifetime achievement award by the North East Business Executive.

== Publications ==
- Loebl, Herbert (2005). A Coat Too Long: An Illustrated Autobiography. Fen Drayton.
- Loebl, Herbert (1987). Government Factories and the Origins of British Regional Policy, 1934-1948: Including a Case Study of North Eastern Trading Estates Ltd. Aldershot: Avebury. ISBN 0566053438.
- Loebl, Herbert (2000). Juden in Bamberg : die Jahrzehnte vor dem Holocaust (in German) (2. verb. Aufl. ed.). Bamberg: Verl. Fränkischer Tag. ISBN 3928648489.
