= William Fittall =

British civil servant (1953–2022)

Sir William Robert Fittall (26 July 1953 – 10 March 2022) was a British civil servant and Anglican lay reader. From 2002 to 2015, he served as the secretary-general of the Archbishops' Council and the General Synod of the Church of England. He had previously worked as a civil servant in the Home Office, the Northern Ireland Office, and the Cabinet Office. Fittall died on 10 March 2022, at the age of 68.

== Early life and education ==
Fittall was born on 26 July 1953. He was educated at Dover Grammar School for Boys, a state grammar school in Dover, Kent. From 1972 to 1975, he read modern languages and classics at Christ Church, Oxford, graduating with a Bachelor of Arts (BA) degree; as per tradition, his BA was later promoted to a Master of Arts (MA Oxon) degree. He later studied at the École nationale d'administration in Paris from 1980 to 1981.

== Career ==
Fittall joined the Home Office as a civil servant in 1975. He was a private secretary to a minister of state at the Home Office from 1979 to 1980, and a private secretary to the home secretary from 1985 to 1987. He was principal private secretary to the Secretary of State for Northern Ireland from 1992 to 1993. He ended his Civil Service career as associate political director of the Northern Ireland Office from 2000 to 2002.

From 1977, Fittall was an Anglican lay reader. Until 2011, he served and worshipped at St Mark's Church, Battersea Rise, a conservative evangelical church in the Church of England's Diocese of Southwark. At the time of his death, he was a lay reader in the benefice of St Stephen Lympne and St Peter & St Paul, Saltwood, in the Diocese of Canterbury.

== Honours ==
In the 2016 New Year Honours List, Fittall was made a Knight Bachelor "for services to the Church of England". In June 2017, he was awarded the Canterbury Cross for Services to the Church of England by the Archbishop of Canterbury "for his outstanding and sustained contribution to the Church of England and to the Archbishops' Council in particular".
