= Eric Mercer =

British bishop (1917–2003)

Eric Arthur John Mercer (6 December 1917 – 8 November 2003) was an Anglican bishop in the Church of England. He was the first Bishop of Birkenhead from 1965 to 1973 and, from then until his retirement, the Bishop of Exeter.

Mercer was educated at Dover Grammar School for Boys and Kelham Theological College. After wartime service with the Sherwood Foresters he began his ordained ministry as a curate at Coppenhall. In 1951 he was appointed priest in charge of Heald Green and then became rector of St Thomas' Church, Stockport and, from 1959 (his final appointment before his ordination to the episcopate), the Diocese of Chester's diocesan missioner. In 1973 he was translated to be the Bishop of Exeter. He died in retirement, at Chilmark, Wiltshire, aged 85.

Church of England titles
New title Inaugural appointment	Bishop of Birkenhead; 1965 – 1973	Succeeded by Ronald Brown
Preceded by Robert Cecil Mortimer	Bishop of Exeter; 1973 – 1985	Succeeded by Hewlett Thompson
