= Bob Grigg =

Robert Edward Grigg (23 June 1924 – February 2002) was a British aerospace engineer, and was the chief designer of the highly-successful British Aerospace 146 (Hawker Siddeley).

== Early life ==
He was born in Great Yarmouth on the Norfolk coast. He was the son of Robert Grigg and Emily Rudderham.

His mother was Emily Blanchflower Rudderham from 52 Lowestoft Road, in Gorleston-on-Sea, born 1889 in Norwich. Her mother was Emily (1867-1933) from Great Melton, and her father was Arthur Blanchflower Rudderham (9 March 1863 - 1938), who married in 1889.

His parents lived at 184 Elms Vale Road in Dover. Captain Robert Smith Grigg was born in 1894.

He attended Dover County School for Boys, where he was a prefect. He took part in the 100yds and the high jump, and played in the school cricket team as an all-rounder. He acquired his School Certificate in 1940.

He attended the De Havilland Technical School from 1943.

On 29 December 1942 at 1.03am, his father's ship S.S. Lynton Grange, in Convoy ON 154, was torpedoed, and sunk by German submarine U-628, part of Wolfpack Ungestüm. The ship had been damaged by German submarine U-406. It sunk in 90 seconds. All 41 sailors and 10 gunners survived. The crew was landed by HMS Milne (G14) at Ponta Delgada in the Azores. U-628 was destroyed on 3 July 1943 by depth charges dropped by an RAF Consolidated B-24 Liberator, north-west of Ortegal, in Spain.

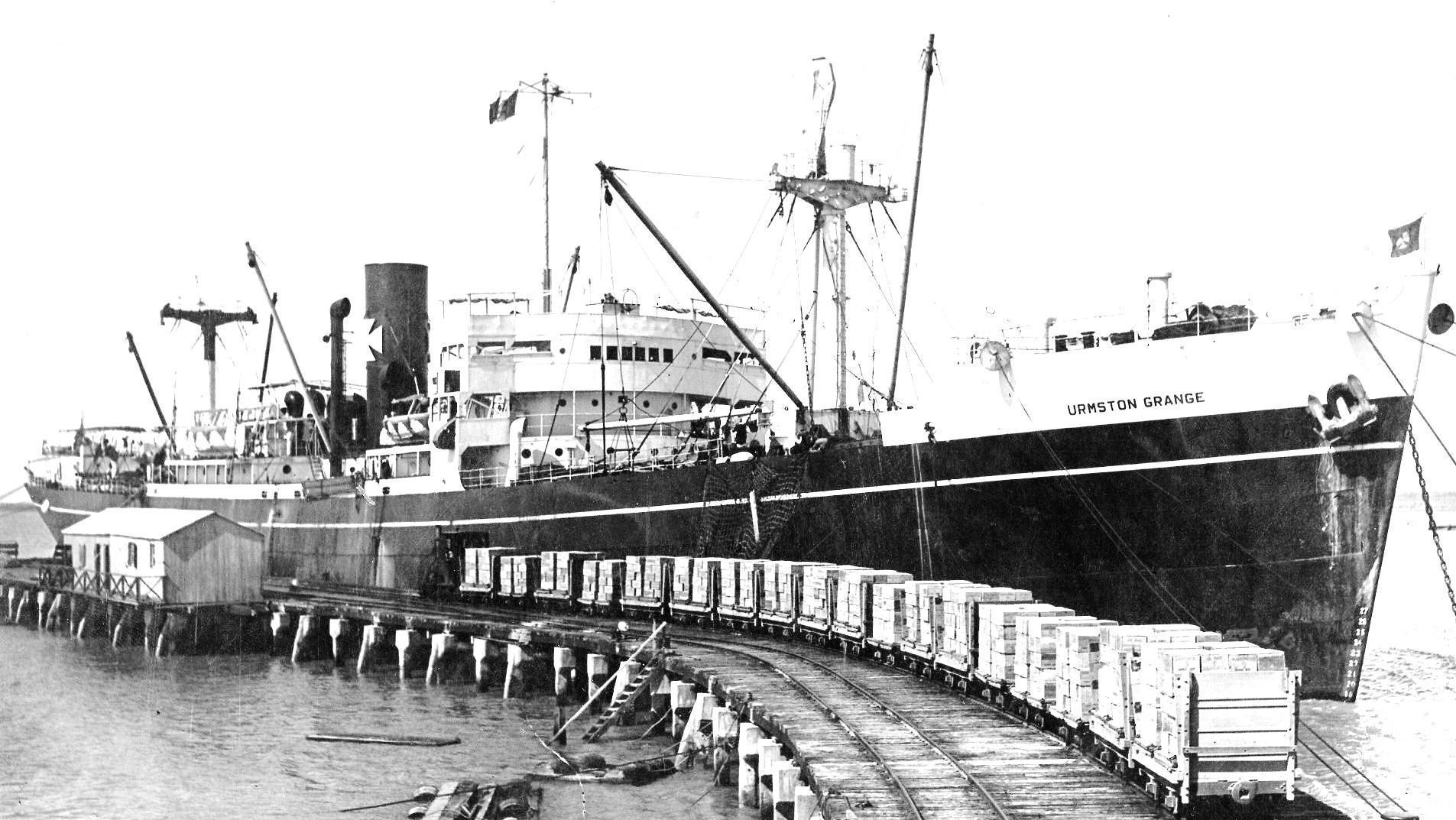
Urmston Grange

His father captained the ship S.S. 'Empire Pibroch', working for the Houlder Line, later called 'Urmston Grange'.

== Career ==
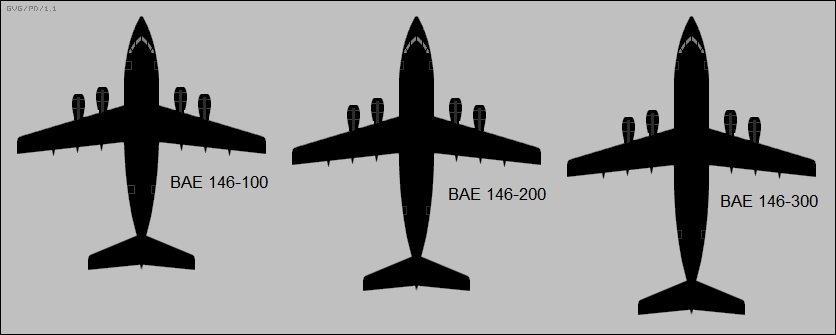
Variants of the BAe 146

=== British Aerospace 146 ===
394 of the BAe 146 were produced, making it the most successful British airliner. Production started in 1983 and ended in 2002. It began as the De Havilland DH123, then the DH126 which was a scaled-up version of the DH125 which had been built at Hatfield. As Hawker Siddeley it became the HS131. Woodford (former Avro site) was designing the HS860 and it was proposed to merge this design team with that of the HS136 in Hertfordshire. A similar concurrent design was the proposed four-engined Armstrong Whitworth AW.681. By 1969 the design had rear engines. On 29 August 1973 the HS146 project at Hatfield (former de Havilland) was approved by Hawker Siddeley, with plans for a first flight by December 1975. On 21 October 1974 the project was deferred. As British Aerospace, the project was restarted on 10 July 1978, with the first flight of G-SSSH taking place on 3 September 1981 piloted by Mike Goodfellow with Peter Sedgwick, another British Aerospace test pilot.

The aircraft type is now supplied by BAE Systems Regional Aircraft. The aircraft is known by airlines for its excellent STOL characteristics. On 27 November 2001, BAE closed its Regional Jets programme. The last delivered was from Woodford on 25 November 2003 when OH-SAP, a BAe RJ-85, was delivered for Blue1; this was also shortly before the last commercial flight of Concorde.

The BAC One-Eleven, a slightly earlier small airliner, sold 244.

Other projects

He also worked on the de Havilland Comet, the Hawker Siddely Trident and the Airbus wing.

== Personal life ==
He married Patricia Williams in 1947. He married on Saturday 21 June 1947 at Ferndale, Rhondda Cynon Taf, at the Baptist Church. The best man was John McCulloch, of de Havilland, later visiting Jersey. His wife was the daughter of Thomas Williams of 19 Ffaldau Terrace, Ferndale.

They had two sons, with Adrian Robert Grigg born on 6 January 1950 at Applecroft Nursing Home, in Welwyn, and another in 1957.

He died in Luton in 2002, having lived previously in Harpenden in Hertfordshire.

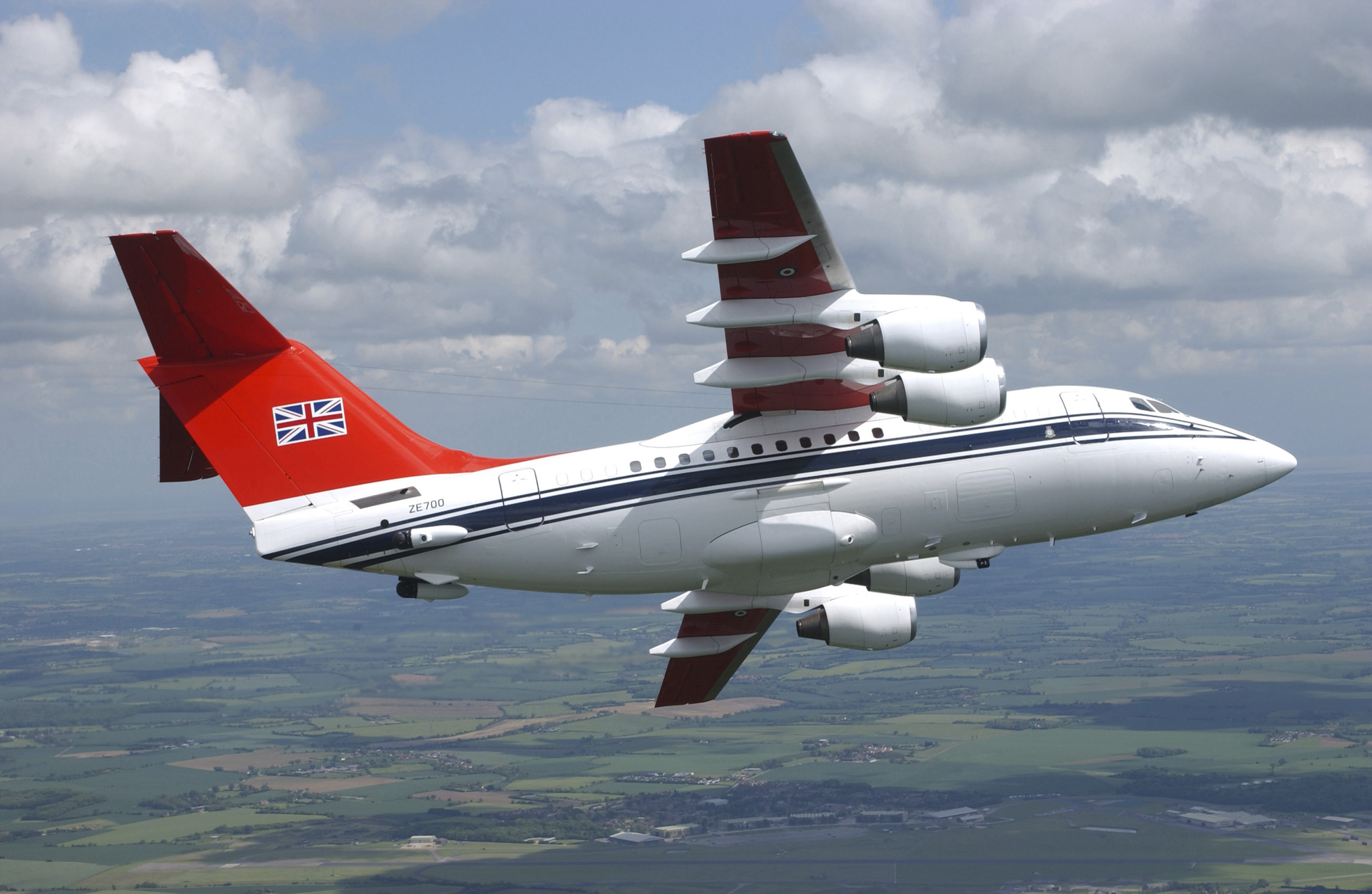
BAe 146 of 32 (The Royal) Squadron, based at RAF Northolt. The BAe 146 entered service with Dan-Air in May 1983
