= Michael White (cricketer) =

English cricketer

William Michael Eastwood White, CBE (22 May 1913 – 15 February 2003) was an English cricketer active from 1937 to 1949 who played for Northamptonshire (Northants). He was born in Barnes, Surrey on 22 May 1913 and died in Guernsey on 15 February 2003. From 1924 to 1932, White was educated at Dover County School for Boys (now Dover Grammar School for Boys), then from 1933 to 1937 at Trinity Hall, Cambridge. During the 1930s, in addition to his cricket interests White also played rugby for Dover town.

White appeared in 21 first-class matches as a righthanded batsman who bowled right arm medium fast. He scored 398 runs with a highest score of 48 and took 42 wickets with a best performance of four for 67.

In the 1960s, Brigadier White was appointed aide-de-camp to the Queen, and appointed a CBE in the 1966 New Year Honours list.
