= Lord William Cecil (bishop) =

British bishop (1863–1936)

- Bishop of Exeter
- Cecil in 1914
- Church: Church of England
- See: Exeter
- In office: 1916–1936
- Predecessor: Archibald Robertson
- Successor: Charles Edward Curzon
- Previous post: Rector of Hatfield

Orders
- Ordination: 1887

Personal details
- Born: 9 March 1863 Hatfield House
- Died: 23 June 1936 (aged 73)

Lord Rupert Ernest William Gascoyne-Cecil (9 March 1863 – 23 June 1936) was Bishop of Exeter from 1916 to 1936. He was the second son of the 3rd Marquess of Salisbury. Educated at Eton and Oxford, he was rector of Hatfield for 28 years before being appointed a bishop. Married in 1887, he had three daughters and four sons, three of whom were killed in the First World War. As bishop he was generally liked, but had a reputation for eccentricity.

== Biography ==
Cecil was born at Hatfield House, the second son of Lord Robert Cecil, third (but second surviving) son of the 2nd Marquess of Salisbury, and Lady Robert Cecil, née Georgina Alderson. In 1865, his father's elder brother died without an heir, his father thereby became Viscount Cranborne as heir apparent to the 2nd Marquess, and Cecil became The Hon. William Cecil. In 1868, his father succeeded as 3rd Marquess, and Cecil became Lord William Cecil. His elder brother was James, Viscount Cranborne (later 4th Marquess), and his younger brothers included another Lord Robert Cecil (later 1st Viscount Cecil of Chelwood) and Lord Hugh Cecil (later 1st Baron Quickswood). He was educated at Eton, where he was bullied and nicknamed "Fish", a name that stuck with him among family and friends throughout his life. Following Eton he was educated at University College, Oxford where he gained a third in law. After leaving university, Cecil worked for a few months in London's East End slums.

He was ordained in 1887, and married Lady Florence ("Fluffy") Mary Bootle-Wilbraham, daughter of Edward Bootle-Wilbraham, 1st Earl of Lathom on 16 August of the same year. They had four sons and three daughters. Their eldest son Randle William was born 28 November 1889 and was killed in action during the First World War on 1 December 1917. Their third and fourth sons were also killed in that war: John Arthur (28 March 1893 – 27 August 1918) and Rupert Edward (20 January 1895 – 11 July 1915). Lady Cecil opposed the policy of non-repatriation of the war dead and the ban on individual memorials, leading unsuccessful efforts that petitioned the government and the Imperial War Graves Commission to change their stance. The Cecils' eldest son was among the missing commemorated on the Cambrai Memorial in France, while the graves of their other two sons are in France and Belgium. The inscriptions on their gravestones (chosen by the family) read: "I LOOK FOR THE RESURRECTION AND THE LIFE OF THE WORLD TO COME" (John Arthur, France) and "I BELIEVE IN THE RESURRECTION OF THE DEAD AND IN THE LIFE TO COME" (Rupert Edward, Belgium). Their second son Victor Alexander, was wounded twice in the war, but survived. They also had three daughters.

Cecil's first curacy was in Great Yarmouth, but this lasted for less than a year, because in 1888 his father had him appointed as Rector of Hatfield, which came with a fine rectory some distance from the town. However he persuaded his father to build him a smaller house nearer to the town so he could be closer to his parishioners. He remained in that post for the next 28 years, also becoming Rural Dean of Hertford from 1904; a chaplain to King Edward VII from 1909; and an honorary canon of St Alban's Cathedral from 1910. In 1908 he attended the fifth Lambeth Conference which led him to an interest in China, which country he later visited several times. He tried unsuccessfully to establish a Christian university there and in 1910, with his wife, he wrote a book: Changing China.

=== Bishopric ===
In 1916 the Prime Minister, H. H. Asquith, offered him the post of Bishop of Exeter, and although initially unwilling to move, he finally accepted. Trevor Beeson, in his book The Bishops (2002), expresses surprise at the appointment, stating that it was "easily the most extraordinary episcopal appointment of the twentieth century" because of his total unsuitability "by aptitude and experience for a bishopric". Beeson went on to surmise that only a person with a large personal income such as Cecil could have been appointed to the see at the time because one third of its annual income was being paid as a pension to his predecessor, Archibald Robertson who had resigned aged 63 and lived until 1931.

Cecil was bishop for the last two years of the Great War. He pressed women to take on jobs vacated by men. ‘The foulest task honours the hands of those who work for their country.’ He instructed clergy to keep up appearances in wartime ‘A gloomy face and a prognostication of evil is now not only unpatriotic but is also most unchristian.’

Cecil's episcopate was notable for its tolerance. He took the view that the principles of the Church were broad enough to allow wide latitude in the permissible forms of religious service, so he did not try to enforce any particular theological school of thought, and maintained a friendly relationship with the leaders of Nonconformist groups. He did, however, quarrel with his cathedral when he suggested the abolition of the office of the Dean, with the money that would be saved being used to pay for a suffragan bishop to increase pastoral care in the diocese. His proposal did not come to fruition and was put down as one of "Love in a Mist's" madcap ideas.

William Exon
A shaggy head, a woolly mind,
The Cecil temper – and behind?
Ah yes! I wonder what you'd find?
A humble soul, perplext and kind.

— W. R. Matthews, contemporary Dean of Exeter.

=== Eccentricity ===
As bishop, Cecil gained a reputation for eccentricity and the nickname of "Love in a Mist" was given to him, according to Beeson, on account of his "administrative ineptitude and autocratic unwillingness to take advice", ameliorated by a most loving personality.

Beeson relates several instances of Cecil's eccentric behaviour. On one occasion a guest having tea with him at his home was surprised when he fed pieces of crumpets to two rats that came out of holes in the floor, and threw powdered copper sulphate on the fire to turn the flames green, remarking that he liked the colour. Once, goes another story, while robing in the vestry before a service, he held a handkerchief between his teeth, but forgot to return it to his pocket and proceeded to the altar with it still hanging from his mouth. He had been heard to complain that the Bible was "an awkward book", and while travelling around his diocese he would often ring up his wife to ask where he was.

Shortly after his death in 1936, he was commemorated in the cathedral by two sculptures, both bearded: one is on the screen of the Speke chapel in which he is depicted as St Martin giving his cloak to a beggar; the other, as St Peter, is high up on the bishop's throne and was created in 1938 by the Exeter woodcarver, Herbert Read. A tablet in the floor by the throne expresses the wish that the statue will "keep for ever alive the memory" of Lord William Cecil.

=== Writings ===
- Science and Religion, Changing China (1910)
- Difficulties and Duties

=== Family ===
Cecil married, on 16 August 1887, Lady Florence Mary Bootle-Wilbraham, daughter of the 1st Earl of Lathom. They had issue:

- Randle William Gascoyne-Cecil (28 November 1889 - 1 December 1917)
- Victor Alexander Gascoyne-Cecil (21 May 1891 - 17 January 1977)
- John Arthur Gascoyne-Cecil (28 March 1893 - 27 August 1918)
- Rupert Edward Gascoyne-Cecil (20 January 1895 - 11 July 1915)
- Eve Alice Gascoyne-Cecil (13 January 1900 - 1994)
- Mary Edith Gascoyne-Cecil (13 January 1900 - 1994), married Francis Manners, 4th Baron Manners and had four children.
- Anne Gascoyne-Cecil (8 October 1906 - 23 December 1924).

Church of England titles
Preceded by Archibald Robertson	Bishop of Exeter; 1916–1936	Succeeded by Charles Edward Curzon
