= Ælfric of Crediton =

10th-century Bishop of Crediton

Ælfric
- Bishop of Crediton
- Elected: between 977 and 979
- Term ended: between 986 and 987
- Predecessor: Sideman
- Successor: Ælfwold II

Personal details
- Died: between 986 and 987
- Denomination: Christian

Ælfric (Old English: Ælfrīc; died c. 987) was a medieval Bishop of Crediton.

Ælfric was elected to Crediton between 977 and 979. He died between 986 and 987.

== Citations ==
Christian titles
Preceded by Sideman	Bishop of Crediton c. 978–c. 986	Succeeded by Ælfwold II
