= Æthelgar (bishop of Crediton) =

10th-century Bishop of Crediton

- Bishop of Crediton
- Elected: 934
- Term ended: 952 or 953
- Predecessor: Eadwulf
- Successor: Ælfwold I

Personal details
- Died: 952 or 953
- Denomination: Christian

Æthelgar was a medieval Bishop of Crediton.

Æthelgar was elected to Crediton in 934. He died in 952 or 953.

== Citations ==
Christian titles
Preceded by Eadwulf	Bishop of Crediton; 934–c. 952	Succeeded by Ælfwold I
