= Robert Mortimer (bishop) =

Anglican bishop

Robert Cecil Mortimer (6 December 1902 – 11 September 1976) was an Anglican bishop in the Church of England.

Mortimer was educated at St Edward's School, Oxford and Keble College in the same city. He was made deacon at Michaelmas 1926 (3 October) at his title church (St Mary Redcliffe) and ordained priest the Michaelmas following (2 October 1927) at St Alban's, Westbury-on-Trym — both times by George Nickson, Bishop of Bristol; and was a curate at St Mary Redcliffe. He then became a lecturer in canon law and then the Regius Professor of Moral and Pastoral Theology at the University of Oxford before his ordination to the episcopate in 1949 to serve as Bishop of Exeter, which See he held for 24 years. He was consecrated a bishop on St Mark's Day 1949 (25 April), by Geoffrey Fisher, Archbishop of Canterbury, at Westminster Abbey.

As the Bishop of Exeter, Mortimer set up an exorcism commission, which published its report in 1973.

Mortimer was also a notable author, and frequently appeared on BBC Television. He had four children, one of whom was the journalist and author Edward Mortimer.

Church of England titles
Preceded by Charles Edward Curzon	Bishop of Exeter; 1949 – 1973	Succeeded by Eric Arthur John Mercer
