= Eadwulf of Crediton =

10th-century Bishop of Crediton

Eadwulf
- Bishop of Crediton
- Elected: 909
- Term ended: 934
- Predecessor: Putta
- Successor: Æthelgar

Personal details
- Died: 934
- Denomination: Christian

Eadwulf (or Edwulf) was a medieval Bishop of Crediton.

== Life ==
Eadwulf was elected to Crediton in 909 and built a cathedral there in 910, which later became the collegiate church of Crediton. He was also associated with the founding of the town of Launceston, Cornwall.

Eadwulf died in 934 and was buried at Crediton church.

== Supposed epitaph ==
The Devon historian John Prince (d. 1723) recorded a Latin inscription in verse said to have been engraved on the ledger-stone in Crediton Church of one of the early Bishops of Crediton, he suggested possibly that of Bishop "Eadulph died 932" (sic). The inscription survives in almost identical wording on the monumental brass of Giles Daubeney, 6th Baron Daubeney (1393–1445/46) in South Petherton Church, Somerset. Also the first two lines of it were requested by the will dated about 1500 of a member of the Wilmer family of East Leigh in North Devon, to be inscribed on a monumental brass in his own memory. The inscription is as follows:

Sis testis Xpe (Note: Xpe, abbreviation of Greek form Χριστός, given vocative case ending -e as if Latin Christe, pronounced here for rhyming purposes "Crist-ay") q(uo)d non jacet (hic) lapis iste
Corpus ut ornetur sed spiritus (ut) memoretur
Quisquis eris qui transieris sta perlege plora
Sum q(uo)d eris fueramq(ue) q(uo)d es pro me p(re)cor ora

Translated literally line by line as:

Be a witness, O Christ, that this stone does not lie here
To adorn the body, but that it might commemorate the soul.
Whoever thou art who will pass by, stand, read, weep:
I am what you will be, I was what you are. I beseech you, pray for me!

Prince made a verse translation thus:

Christ! bear me witness, that this stone is not
Put here t'adorn a body, that must rot;
But keep a name, that it mayn't be forgot.
Whoso doth pass, stay, read, bewail, I am
What thou must be; was what thou art the same;
Then pray for me, e're you go whence ye came

== Citations ==
Christian titles
Preceded by Putta	Bishop of Crediton; 909–934	Succeeded by Æthelgar
