= Fairlie Estelle Caroline Gascoyne-Cecil =

British plant collector

- Born: Fairlie Estelle Caroline Watson; 18 December 1888
- Died: 24 June 1980 (aged 91)
- Other names: Stella Gascoyne-Cecil
- Known for: plant collector

Fairlie Estelle Caroline Gascoyne-Cecil (18 December 1888 – 24 June 1980) was a plant collector and member of a British army family.

She was the elder daughter of Lieutenant Colonel Arthur Watson of the Suffolk Regiment and Fairlie Anderson. She was born in Shimla in India on 18 December 1888. She married Victor Alexander Gascoyne-Cecil on 25 November 1915. They had two sons, Rupert Arthur Victor Gascoyne-Cecil (1917– 2004) and Anthony Robert Gascoyne-Cecil (1921–1998). She died in East Hanningfield.

She collected plant specimens in Peru including Selaginella haematodes on the banks of the river Penené and the type specimen of the fern Adiantum ceciliae (now Adiantum urophyllum) that are now in the herbarium of the Natural History Museum, London that was later described by A. H Alston.
