= Eddie Crush =

English cricketer

- Lt. E. Crush Royal Engineers receiving the Military Cross from Field Marshal Montgomery

Personal information
- Full name: Edmund Crush
- Born: 25 April 1917; Dover, Kent, England
- Died: 9 June 2007 (aged 90); Deal, Kent, England
- Batting: Right-handed
- Bowling: Right-arm medium Right-arm off spin

Domestic team information
- Years: Team
- 1946–1949: Kent County Cricket Club

Career statistics
| Competition | First-class |
|---|---|
| Matches | 45 |
| Runs scored | 1,078 |
| Batting average | 16.08 |
| 100s/50s | 0/5 |
| Top score | 78 |
| Balls bowled | 6,659 |
| Wickets | 83 |
| Bowling average | 38.10 |
| 5 wickets in innings | 2 |
| 10 wickets in match | 0 |
| Best bowling | 6/50 |
| Catches/stumpings | 23/– |
- Source: CricInfo, 26 December 2020

Edmund Crush MC (25 April 1917 – 9 June 2007) was an English cricketer who played for Kent County Cricket Club between 1946 and 1949.

Crush was born in Dover in 1917, the youngest of seven brothers, and was educated at Dover Grammar School for Boys in the 1930s. He served during World War II with the Royal Engineers. On D-Day, he was a subaltern and decorated with the Military Cross for his actions during the fight for Caen by Field Marshal Montgomery. His citation read: "As a result of his courage and determined leadership, anti-tank guns, troops and an anti-tank regiment of the Royal Artillery were able to get up to the objective for consolidation at a very early stage in the battle." Crush finished the war with the rank of major.

Crush played first-class cricket for Kent as a right-arm swing and off-break bowler. The highlight of his career was dismissing Don Bradman in 1948 when Kent played the touring Australians. Asked why he hadn't appealed Crush said "He was my hero, thousands of people including me wanted to see him bat" adding "the last time I had seen him was in 1930 when as a 13-year-old I cycled from Dover to Canterbury to watch him ... the words just wouldn't come out". Crush retired after the 1949 season.

Following his playing career, Crush established a sport outfitters shop in Dover. He remained an enthusiastic club cricketer during the 1950s playing for Dover Cricket Club and St Lawrence & Highland Court. He was on the Kent General Committee and was a cricket coach. He served on the Test and County Cricket Board Disciplinary Committee and was a member of MCC.

He married Dorothea Tolputt on Christmas Day 1955 at Lydden Church in Dover. The couple had two sons. Crush died at Dover in 2007 aged 90.
