= Croftinloan School =

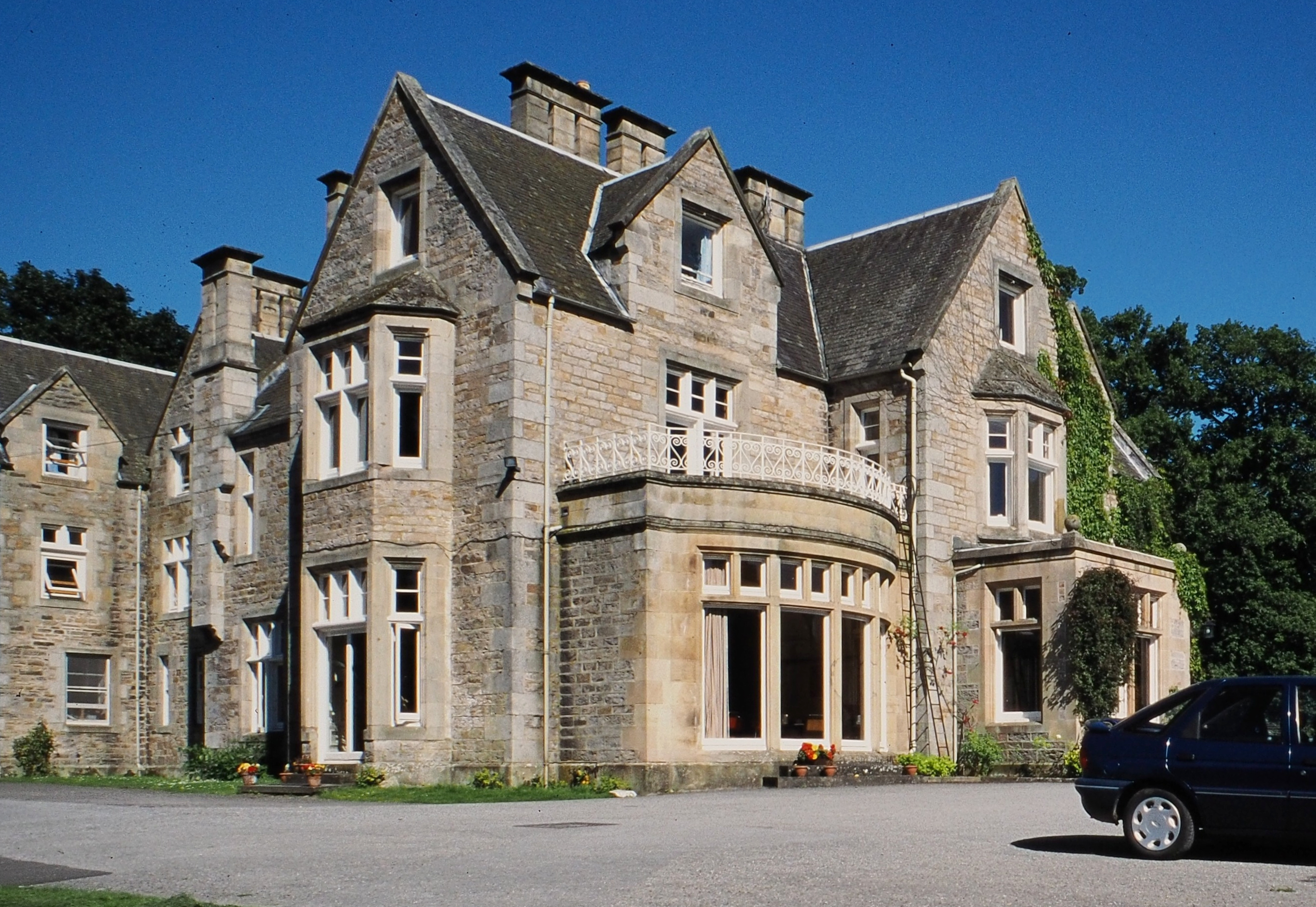

Location
- Croftinloan; Pitlochry, Perthshire, PH16 5JS; Scotland

Information
- Type: Preparatory school
- Established: 1936
- Founder: Hugo Brown
- Closed: 2000
- Gender: Co-educational
- Age: 5 to 13

Croftinloan Preparatory School was a co-educational private preparatory school near Pitlochry, Scotland.

== History ==
Croftinloan School was established in 1936 as a boys' prep school by Hugo Brown, a former pupil at Monkton Combe School and graduate of Christ's College, Cambridge. Hugo Brown bought the residential and sporting estate of Croftinloan in 1935 from Mr. J Paterson Brown, who used Croftinloan House as a shooting lodge. The estate was originally owned by members of the Atholl-Fergusson family.

In April 2000, the Governors announced that the school would close in June.

In 2013, Croftinloan House was demolished to make way for a housing development.

== Notable alumni ==
- Patrick Hodge, Lord Hodge (born 1953), Justice of the Supreme Court of the United Kingdom.
- David Urquhart (born 1952), Bishop of Birmingham.
