= William Alley =

Anglican bishop of Dunwich

- Bishop of Exeter
- Diocese: Diocese of Exeter
- In office: 1560 - 1571
- Predecessor: James Turberville
- Successor: William Bradbridge

Orders
- Ordination: 1534 (deacon)
- Consecration: 14 July 1560 by Matthew Parker

Personal details
- Born: William Alley; Abt 1510 Wycombe, Buckinghamshire, England
- Died: 15 April 1570 Exeter, Devon, England
- Buried: Exeter Cathedral
- Parents: William Alley
- Spouse: Sybil Honacott Bodleigh
- Children: Matthew Alley, Roger Alley, Jane Alley, Jone Alley, Peter Alley, Austin Alley
- Education: Eton College, King's College, Cambridge, Oxford University

William Thomas Alley was a sixteenth-century English cleric and author who was the Bishop of Exeter from 1560 to 1570.

William Alley is known to the literary world by his Poor Man's Librarie, printed in folio by John Day, London, 1565, or Lectures upon the First Epistle of Saint Peter, red publiquely in the Cathedrall Church of Saint Paule, within the Citye of London, in 1560. Here are adioyned at the ende of euery special treatise, certain fruitful annotacions called miscellanea, because they do entreate of diverse and sundry matters.

== Life ==
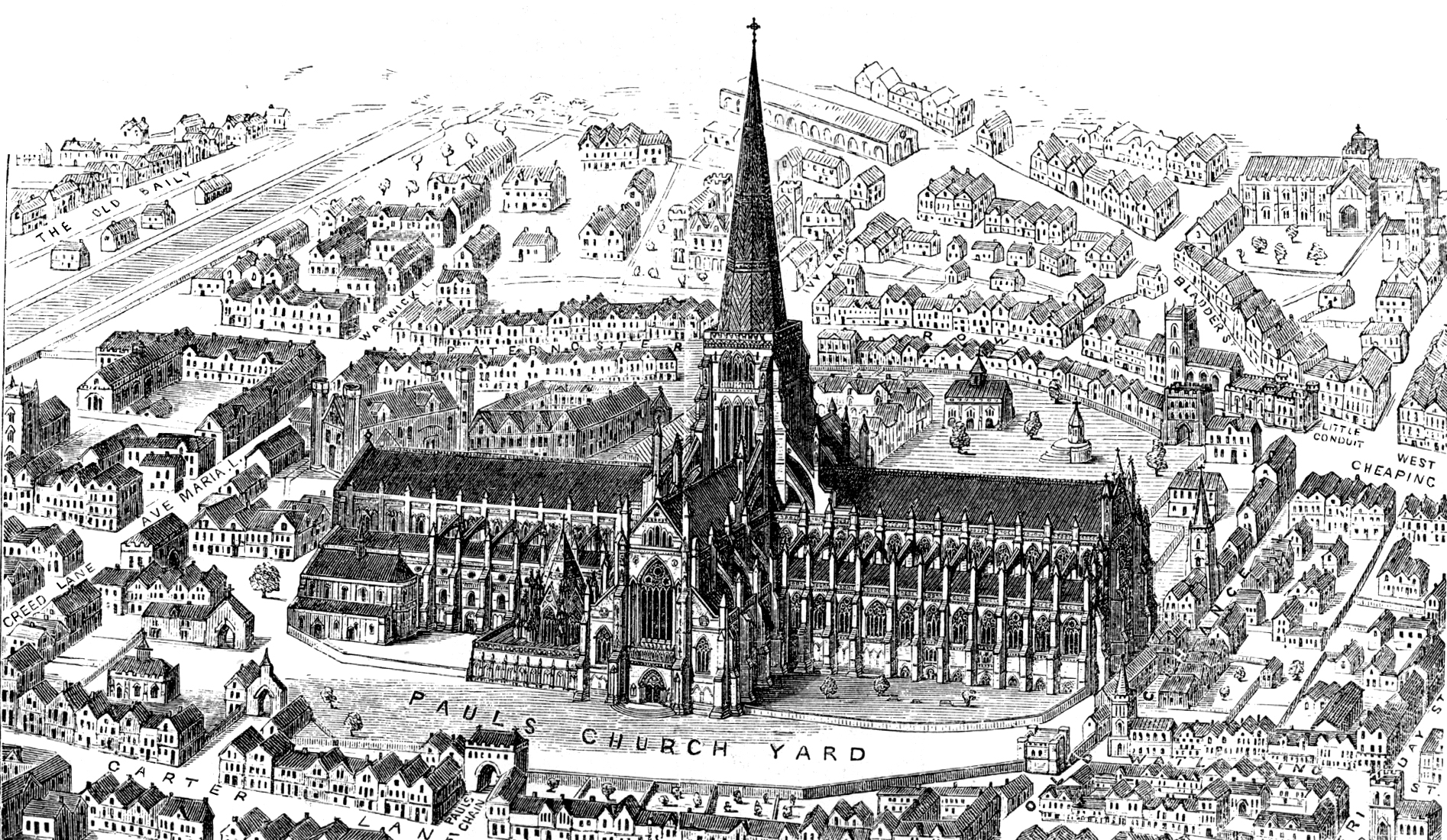
Engraving of Old St Paul's, where Alley served as a prebendary.

William Alley was born in about 1510 in Chipping Wycombe (now High Wycombe), Buckinghamshire where his father William served as mayor in 1501-2, 1507-8, and 1544-5. After Eton College, he entered King’s College, Cambridge in 1528 at age 17, receiving a BA in 1533. He furthered his studies in Oxford, which ultimately awarded him a Doctor of Divinity in1561. In the meantime, Alley was ordained as a Deacon at Lincoln Cathedral in April 1534. Little is known of Alley’s life from his ordination until his appointments as rector in Oakford, Devon in 1544 and in Croscombe, Somerset in 1549.

This was a crucial period in the English Reformation. The Supremacy Act of 1534 made the monarch the supreme leader of the English Church. Despite having broken with the Pope, Henry VIII retained core Roman Catholic doctrines including that clergy must be celibate and were forbidden to marry. He went further in the Act of Six Articles of 1539, which made contravention of this doctrine punishable by death or imprisonment. Henry was succeeded by his son Edward VI, who instituted several protestant reforms, including the Clergy Marriage Act in 1548. With the relaxation of the celibacy regulations, William married Sybil Honacott of Landkey, Devon in 1549. However, it seems that he had already fathered at least two children, Matthew in about 1544 and Roger in abt 1545. By several accounts, Roger Alley's mother was Sybil Bodleigh. William Alley's 1570 will refers to a Christopher Bodleigh as his "son-in-law", which in the sixteenth century denoted a stepson, rather than a daughter's spouse. Thus, it is likely that Christopher Bodleigh was Sybil Honacott's son by a previous relationship. The couple had at least four children following their marriage: Jane (1549), Jone (1563), Peter (1564), and Austin (1565).

Alley became Vicar of Doddington, Lincolnshire in 1550. Queen Mary came to the throne in 1553 and returned the English Church to Roman Catholicism, reversing most of the reforms of Henry VIII and Edward VI. Married priests were deprived of their livings. Alley travelled in northern England, keeping a low profile and making a meagre living as a physician and teacher. Ally’s fortunes changed with the ascension of Elizabeth I in 1558. He returned to London as Prebendary at St. Paul’s Cathedral. He made an impression on the Queen, and was chosen to succeed the deprived James Turberville. On 27 April 1560, she issued her congé d'élire to the Dean and Chapter. It was delivered to the president, Chancellor Levison, on 5 May. In the absence of the newly elected dean, Gregory Dodds, the election took place on 20 May and his consecration to the episcopate was held on 14 July that year.

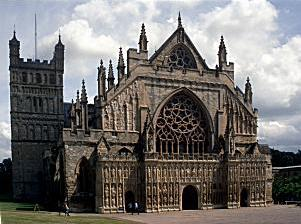
Exeter Cathedral, Alley's burial place

The revenues of the see and of his chapter had of late been lamentably reduced. But the rectory of Honiton was given to the bishop towards the better maintenance of his rank; and in its parochial church, and even in the rectory-house, he held several ordinations "in Rectoria - in domo Domini Episcopi apud Honyton", as we learn from his registers. Owing to the impoverished state of the finances of his dean and chapter, with the unanimous consent of its members, and under the royal authority, he diminished the number of the canons of the cathedral from twenty-four to nine. His statute for this purpose is dated 22 February 1561. Attempts were made at subsequent periods to set aside this ordinance, which conferred the power and emoluments on the favoured nine, to the exclusion of the other fifteen. It proved useless, however, to combat a practice which had been legalised by time and authority.

As A.L. Rouse observed, the bishop was “ a good servant of the state, rather overmuch given to the pleasures of nepotism. In 1561, he had his son, Roger, presented to the living of St. Ervan, which was in the gift of the bishop; the next year the lad - he was still only a scholar at the university - was made archdeacon of Cornwall...In 1569, he was given the living of Goran, his brother Matthew that of Talland". Roger Alley was ordained a priest in 1566, at age 21. He subsequent appointments included Prebendary of Exeter Cathedral (1568-74), and Vicar in Otterton, Devon (1568-90). Following the bishop’s death in 1570, his successor deprived Roger of his archdeaconry. Bishop Alley also bestowed several benefices on his stepson, Christopher Bodleigh, including ordination as deacon (1561) and priest (1562), and the livings of Newton St Cyres (1561), Upton Hellions (1563), Harberton (1565), and Whitstone (1569).

Bishop Alley was buried in the choir of Exeter Cathedral, his epitaph stating he died on 15 April 1570, the generally accepted date. However, there is contradictory evidence: his will was probated on 12 April 1570, three days before the ostensible date of death; and the CCEd database gives the date of death as 15 March 1571.

== Arms ==
Coat of arms of William Alley
Escutcheon Azure, a pale engrailed ermine between two lions rampant argent.

Church of England titles
Preceded by James Turberville	Bishop of Exeter; 1560–1571	Succeeded by William Bradbridge
