= Eadnoth of Crediton =

11th-century Bishop of Crediton

Eadnoth
- Bishop of Crediton
- Elected: between 1011 and 1015
- Term ended: between 1019 and 1027
- Predecessor: Ælfwold III
- Successor: Lyfing

Personal details
- Died: between 1019 and 1027
- Denomination: Christian

Eadnoth (or Ednoth) was a medieval Bishop of Crediton.

Eadnoth was elected to Crediton between 1011 and 1015. He died between 1019 and 1027.

== Citations ==
Christian titles
Preceded by Ælfwold III	Bishop of Crediton c. 1013–c. 1023	Succeeded by Lyfing
