= Bishop of Birkenhead =

Anglican suffragan bishop in England

The Bishop of Birkenhead is an episcopal title used by a suffragan bishop of the Church of England Diocese of Chester, in the Province of York, England. The title takes its name after Birkenhead, a town located on the Wirral Peninsula.

== List of bishops ==
Bishops of Birkenhead
From	Until	Incumbent	Notes
1965	1973	Eric Mercer	(1917–2003). Translated to Exeter
1974	1992	Ronald Brown	(1921 - 2019)
1993	1999	Michael Langrish	(b. 1946). Translated to Exeter
2000	2007	David Urquhart	(b. 1952) Translated to Birmingham
2007	2021	Keith Sinclair	(b. 1952) Retired 8 March 2021
2021	present	Julie Conalty	Consecrated 19 July 2021.
