= Ælfwold I (bishop of Crediton) =

10th-century Bishop of Crediton

Ælfwold
- Bishop of Crediton
- Elected: 953
- Term ended: 972
- Predecessor: Æthelgar
- Successor: Sideman

Personal details
- Died: 972
- Denomination: Christian

Ælfwold (or Ælfweald or Aelfwold) was a medieval Bishop of Crediton.

Ælfwold was elected to Crediton in 953. He died in 972.

== Citations ==
Christian titles
Preceded by Æthelgar	Bishop of Crediton; 953–972	Succeeded by Sideman
