= Exoniensis =

Latin adjective for Exeter, England

Exoniensis (usually abbreviated Exon.) is the Latin adjectival form of Exonia, the Latin name for the city of Exeter in Devon, England. It therefore means "of Exeter".

== Latin source ==
The Latin noun Exonia has as its genitive form Exoniae, meaning "of Exeter", which may also be expressed by the adjective Exoniensis, also meaning "of Exeter", which declines like tristis, triste, "sad". The usage may be compared with the common usage in Classical Latin literature of Carthago, genitive Carthaginis, the city of Carthage, with its adjectival form Carthaginiensis.

== Usage ==
It is thus used in the modern age in formal ecclesiastical and academic Latin contexts, most commonly as the post-nominal suffix given to honorary and academic degrees from the University of Exeter and of even more ancient origin as the official signature of the Bishop of Exeter, who signs with his Christian or forename followed by the word Exon. In this way, it is comparable with "Oxon.", abbreviated from Oxoniensis, referring to the University of Oxford, and "Cantab.", abbreviated from Cantabrigiensis, for University of Cambridge. A graduate of the University of Exeter is called an "Exonian", a mixture of the Latin noun with an English adjectival word ending, although other institutions, such as Phillips Exeter Academy, also use this term.
