= Anthony W. Bradley =

British barrister (1934–2021)

Anthony Wilfred Bradley QC (6 February 1934 – 20 December 2021) was a British barrister, academic and leading expert in UK constitutional law, social security and human rights.

== Life and career ==
Bradley was born in Dover, Kent on 6 February 1934. He was educated at Dover Grammar School for Boys and Emmanuel College, Cambridge, where he graduated with a starred-first in law and later received an LLM.

He was professor of law at the University of Edinburgh and co-author (with Keith Ewing) of the leading textbook on Constitutional and Administrative Law. Bradley was a tenant at Cloisters Chambers in London, and died on 20 December 2021, at the age of 87.

== Cases ==
- R (Bancoult) v Secretary of State for Foreign and Commonwealth Affairs (No. 2) [2007] EWCA Civ 498
- Chagos Islanders v The Attorney General & Her Majesty's Indian Ocean Territories Commissioner [2004] EWCA Civ 997

== Publications ==
Books

- Constitutional and Administrative Law (16th edn Pearson 2014) with KD Ewing

Articles

- 'Relations between the Executive, the Judiciary and Parliament - an evolving saga' [2008] Public Law 470

== See also ==
- UK constitutional law
- UK public service law
