= Sideman (bishop) =

10th-century Bishop of Crediton

- Bishop of Crediton
- Elected: 973
- Term ended: 977
- Predecessor: Ælfwold I
- Successor: Ælfric

Personal details
- Died: 977
- Denomination: Christian

Sideman (died 30 April 977) was Bishop of Crediton. He attested charters of King Edgar as abbot of Exeter from 969, and was appointed to the see of Crediton in 973. According to Byrhtferth of Ramsey, King Edward the Martyr "had been instructed in holy scripture under the tutelage of Bishop Sideman". The historian Cyril Hart describes him as a protégé of Ælfhere, ealdorman of Mercia. Sideman died on 30 April 977 at a meeting of a royal council at Kirtlington in Oxfordshire. He had expressed a wish to be buried at Crediton, but King Edward and Dunstan, Archbishop of Canterbury, ordered that he should be conveyed to Abingdon Abbey, where he was buried on the north side of St Paul's chapel.

== Sources ==
- Hart, Cyril (2004). "Edward [St Edward; called Edward the Martyr] (c.962–978)". Oxford Dictionary of National Biography (May 2007 ed.). Oxford University Press. doi:10.1093/ref:odnb/8515.
- Keynes, Simon (2002). An Atlas of Attestations in Anglo-Saxon Charters, c.670-1066. Cambridge, UK: Dept. of Anglo-Saxon, Norse, and Celtic, University of Cambridge, UK. ISBN 978-0-9532697-6-1.
- Lapidge, Michael, ed. (2009). Byrhtferth of Ramsey: The Lives of St Oswald and St Ecgwine (in Latin and English). Oxford, UK: Clarendon Press. ISBN 978-0-19-955078-4.
- Whitelock, Dorothy, ed. (1979). English Historical Documents, Volume 1, c. 500–1042 (2nd ed.). London, UK: Routledge. ISBN 978-0-415-14366-0.

Christian titles
| Preceded by Ælfwold I | Bishop of Crediton; 973–977 | Succeeded by Ælfric |
