= Ælfwold II (bishop of Crediton) =

10th and 11th-century Bishop of Crediton

- Bishop of Crediton
- Elected: between 986 and 987
- Term ended: 1008
- Predecessor: Ælfric
- Successor: Aelfwold III

Personal details
- Died: between 1011 and 1015
- Denomination: Christian

Ælfwold (or Ælfweald or Aelfwold) was a medieval Bishop of Crediton.

== Life ==
Ælfwold was a Benedictine monk at Glastonbury Abbey before he was elected to Crediton between 986 and 987. He was succeeded by Ælfwold III in 1008. He died between sometime before a time frame between 1011 and 1015.

== Will ==
Ælfwold's will is still extant, and the hand drawing up the will matches the hand that drew up a charter of 997 from King Æthelred II to Ælfwold.

In his will, Ælfwold freed all the slaves that had worked on his estates, suggesting the existence of slavery in Anglo-Saxon England, was tempered by the need to free such slaves on death.

== Citations ==
Christian titles
Preceded by Ælfric	Bishop of Crediton c. 987–1008	Succeeded by Aelfwold III
