= Ælfwold III (bishop of Crediton) =

11th-century Bishop of Crediton

- Bishop of Crediton
- Installed: 1008
- Term ended: between 1011 and 1015
- Predecessor: Ælfwold II
- Successor: Eadnoth

Personal details
- Died: between 1011 and 1015
- Denomination: Christian

Ælfwold (or Ælfweald or Aelfwold) was a medieval Bishop of Crediton.

Ælfwold was elected to Crediton in 1008. He died between 1011 and 1015.

== Citations ==
Christian titles
Preceded by Ælfwold II	Bishop of Crediton; 1008–c. 1011 to 1015	Succeeded by Eadnoth
