= Michael Langrish =

20th and 21st-century Bishop of Exeter; Bishop of Birkenhead

The Right Reverend Michael Langrish
- Bishop of Exeter
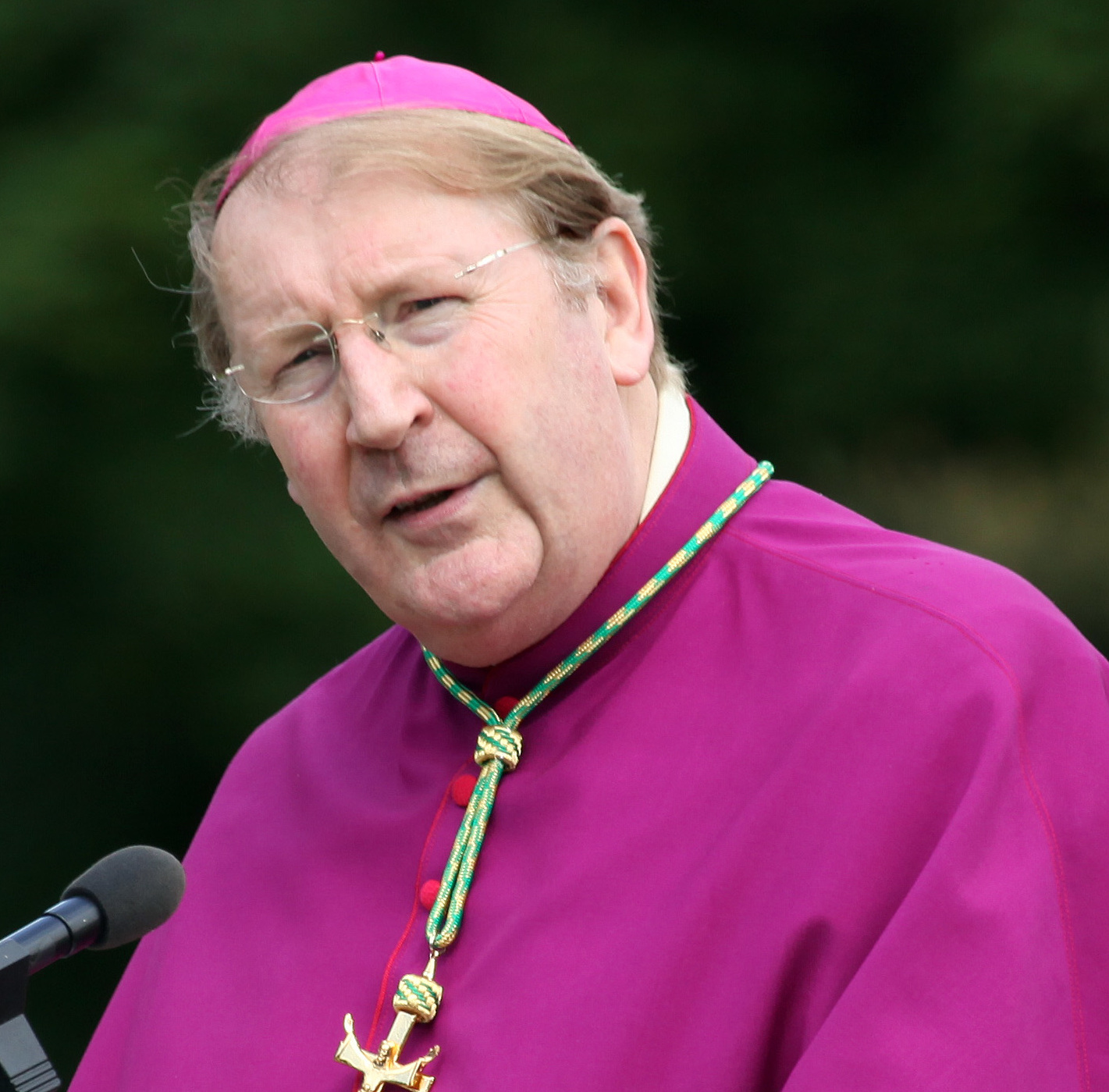
- Bishop Langrish in 2012
- Church: Church of England
- Province: Canterbury
- Diocese: Exeter
- See: Exeter
- In office: 2000–2013
- Predecessor: Hewlett Thompson
- Successor: Robert Atwell
- Other posts: Bishop of Birkenhead; 1993–2000

Orders
- Ordination: 1973 (deacon); 1974 (priest)
- Consecration: 1993 by John Habgood

Personal details
- Born: 1 July 1946 (age 80) Southampton, Hampshire
- Denomination: Anglican
- Parents: Douglas Langrish & Brenda Passingham
- Spouse: Esther Rudd (m. 1968)
- Children: One son, two daughters
- Profession: previously educator
- Education: Birmingham University

Member of the House of Lords
- Lord Spiritual
- Bishop of Exeter; 17 October 2005 – 31 August 2013

Michael Laurence Langrish (born 1 July 1946) is a retired English Anglican bishop. He was Bishop of Exeter from 2000 to 2013.

== Early life and education ==
Langrish was born in Southampton, Hampshire, the son of Douglas Frank Langrish and Brenda Florence Passingham. He was educated at King Edward VI School, Southampton, and Birmingham University, where he received a Bachelor of Social Sciences degree in 1967 and a Postgraduate Certificate in Education a year later. He was further educated at Fitzwilliam College, Cambridge, where he graduated with Bachelor of Arts and Master of Arts degrees in theology in 1973, and at Ridley Hall, Cambridge.

Langrish was lecturer in education in Nigeria from 1969 to 1971.

== Ordained ministry ==
He became deacon in 1973 and was assistant curate at Holy Trinity Church (Shakespeare's Church), Stratford-upon-Avon until 1976. In 1974, he was ordained as a priest, and was chaplain of Rugby School from 1976 to 1981. In the following year he was made vicar of Offchurch and diocesan director of ordinands, and held this post until 1987. From 1982 to 1989 he was the Bishop of Coventry's examining chaplain and, from 1987 to 1993, the rector of the Rugby Team Ministry. Langrish was an honorary canon of Coventry Cathedral between 1990 and 1993.

=== Episcopal ministry ===
Langrish served as Bishop of Birkenhead from 1993 to 2000. In 2000, he was appointed the 70th Bishop of Exeter. He became a Lord Spiritual with a seat at the House of Lords in 2005. On 6 January 2013, Langrish announced his retirement effective 30 June 2013. He duly retired following a final service at Exeter Cathedral.

He has been an honorary assistant bishop in the Diocese of Chichester since 2013 and of the Diocese of Gibraltar in Europe since 2018.

=== Views ===
Langrish was one of the diocesan bishops who signed a letter against Rowan Williams' decision not to block the appointment of Jeffrey John as Bishop of Reading in 2003. The others signatories (referred to, since there were nine, as the "Nazgûl") were: Michael Scott-Joynt (Bishop of Winchester), Michael Nazir-Ali (Rochester), Peter Forster (Chester), James Jones (Liverpool), George Cassidy (Southwell & Nottingham), Graham Dow (Carlisle), John Hind (Chichester) and David James (Bradford).

He was one of four English diocesan bishops who did not ordain women to the priesthood. He is one of the retired bishops associated with The Society, a traditional Catholic association of Church of England.

== Personal life ==
Since 1968 Langrish has been married to the former Esther Rudd; they have one son and two daughters. He was awarded an honorary DD degree by Birmingham University in 2006.

== Styles ==
- Michael Langrish Esq (1946–1973)
- The Revd Michael Langrish (1973–1990)
- The Revd Canon Michael Langrish (1990–1993)
- The Rt Revd Michael Langrish (1993–present)
