= Bishop of Exeter =

Diocesan bishop in the Church of England

- Bishopric

anglican
- Arms of the Bishop of Exeter: Gules, a sword erect in pale argent hilted or surmounted by two keys addorsed in saltire of the last
- Incumbent; Mike Harrison

Location
- Ecclesiastical province: Canterbury
- Residence: The Bishop's Palace, Exeter

Information
- First holder: Werstan; Leofric (first Bishop of Exeter)
- Established: 905 (founded at Tawton); 912 (translated to Crediton); 1050 (translated to Exeter)
- Diocese: Exeter
- Cathedral: Exeter Cathedral (1112–present)

The Bishop of Exeter is the ordinary of the Church of England Diocese of Exeter in the Province of Canterbury. The current bishop is Mike Harrison, since 2024.

From the first bishop until the sixteenth century the Bishops of Exeter were in full communion with the Roman Catholic Church. However, during the Reformation the Church of England broke away from the authority of the Pope and the Roman Catholic Church, at first temporarily and later more permanently. Since the Reformation, the Bishop and Diocese of Exeter has been part of the reformed and catholic Church of England. The bishop's residence is The Bishop's Palace, Exeter.

== History ==
The Anglo-Saxon dioceses after 950

Roman episcopal organization survived the fall of the Roman Empire in south-western Britain, which became the British kingdom of Dumnonia. In about 700, Aldhelm, abbot of Malmesbury wrote a letter to King Geraint of Dumnonia and his bishops. However, by this time eastern Devon had been conquered by the Anglo-Saxons and was part of the diocese of Bishop of Winchester, covering the whole of Wessex. In around 705 The diocese was divided in two and Aldhelm was appointed the first Bishop of Sherborne, covering eastern Devon. Over the next two centuries western Devon was conquered.

=== Crediton ===
In about 909 the diocese of Sherborne was divided and the Diocese of Crediton was created to cover Devon and Cornwall. Crediton was chosen as the site for its cathedral possibly due it having been the birthplace of Saint Boniface and the existence of a monastery there.

In 1046, Leofric became the Bishop of Crediton. Following his appointment he decided that the see should be moved to the larger and more culturally significant and defensible walled town of Exeter. In 1050, King Edward the Confessor authorised that Exeter was to be the seat of the bishop for Devon and Cornwall and that a cathedral was to be built there for the bishop's throne. Thus, Leofric became the last diocesan Bishop of Crediton and the first Bishop of Exeter.

=== Exeter ===
The two dioceses of Crediton and Cornwall, covering Devon and Cornwall, were permanently united under Edward the Confessor by Lyfing's successor Leofric, hitherto Bishop of Crediton, who became first Bishop of Exeter under Edward the Confessor, which was established as his cathedral city in 1050. At first the Abbey Church of St Mary and St Peter, founded by Athelstan in 932, rebuilt in 1019, etc., finally demolished 1971, served as the cathedral.

The bishop of Exeter signs his name as his Christian name or forename followed by Exon., abbreviated from the Latin Episcopus Exoniensis ("Bishop of Exeter").

=== Cathedral ===
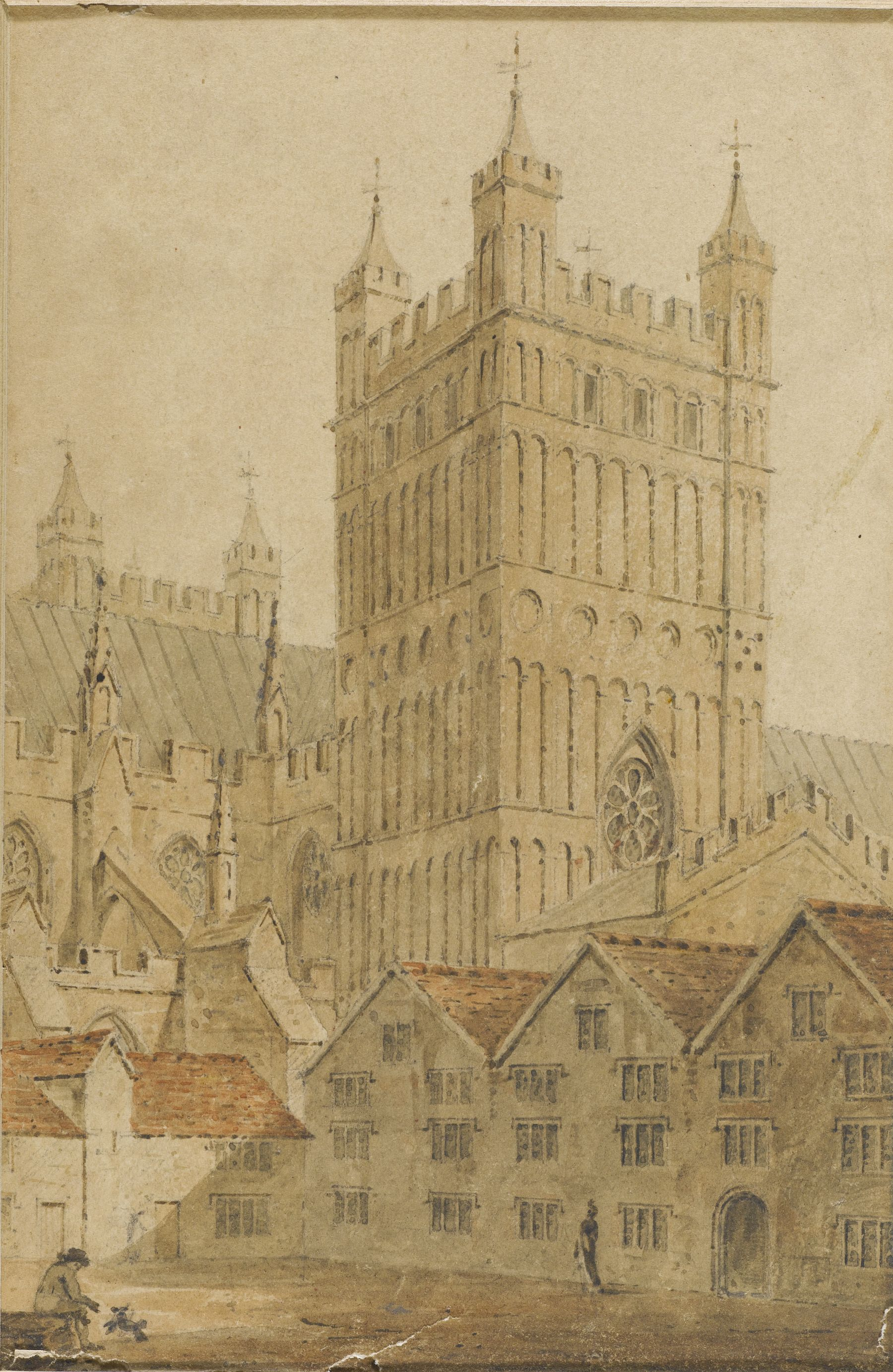
‘South Tower of Exeter Cathedral’, attributed to W. Davey, about 1800-1830

The present cathedral was begun by William de Warelhurst in 1112, the transept towers he built being the only surviving part of the Norman building, which was completed by Marshall at the close of the twelfth century. The cathedral is dedicated to St Peter.

As it now stands, the cathedral is in the decorated style. It was begun by Peter Quinel (1280–1291), continued by Bytton and Stapeldon, and completed, much as it has since remained, by John Grandisson during his long tenure of 42 years.

In many respects Exeter cathedral resembles those of France rather than others found in England. Its special features are the transept towers and the choir, containing much early stained glass. There is also an episcopal throne, separated from the nave by a choir screen (1324) and a stately West front. In a comparison with certain other English cathedrals, it is perhaps disadvantaged by the absence of a central tower and a general lack of elevation, but it is undoubtedly very fine.

=== Organisation ===
The bishops of Exeter, like the general population of the diocese, always enjoyed considerable independence, and the see was one of the largest and richest in England. The remoteness of the see from London prevented it from being bestowed on statesmen or courtiers, so that over the centuries the roll of bishops possessed more capable scholars and administrators than in many other sees. The result was a long and stable line of bishops, leading to active Christian observance in the area.

The diocese contained 604 parishes grouped in four archdeaconries: Cornwall, Barnstaple, Exeter, and Totnes. There were Benedictine, Augustinian, Premonstratensian, Franciscan and Dominican religious houses, and four Cistercian abbeys.

=== Modern history ===
This wealthy diocese was forced to cede land during the reign of Henry VIII, when Vesey was obliged to surrender fourteen of twenty-two manors, and the value of the see was reduced to a third of what it had been. Vesey, despite his Catholic sympathies, held the see until 1551, when he finally had to resign, and was replaced by the Bible translator Miles Coverdale. Following the accession of Mary, in 1553, Vesey was restored, but died soon after in 1554. He was succeeded by James Turberville, the last Catholic Bishop of Exeter. Turberville was removed from the see by the Reformist Elizabeth I in 1559, and died in prison, probably in or about 1570.

Henry Phillpotts served as Bishop of Exeter from 1830 to his death in office in 1869. He was England's longest serving bishop since the 14th century. The diocese was divided in 1876 along the border of Devon and Cornwall, creating the Diocese of Truro (but five parishes which were at the time in Devon were included in this diocese as they had always been within the Archdeaconry of Cornwall). The diocese covers the County of Devon. The see is in the City of Exeter where the seat is located at the Cathedral Church of Saint Peter which was founded as an abbey possibly before 690. The current incumbent is Mike Harrison.

== List of bishops ==
=== Pre-Conquest ===
Bishops of Crediton
From	Until	Incumbent	Notes
c.909	934	Eadwulf	
934	c.952/53	Æthelgar	
953	972	Ælfwold I	
973	977	Sideman	Died on 30 April 977 or 1 or 2 May 977.
c.977/79	c.986/87	Ælfric	
c.986/87	?	Ælfwold II	
?	c.990	Alfred of Malmesbury	
?	c.1011/15	Ælfwold III	
c.1011/15	c.1019/23	Eadnoth	
1027	1046	Lyfing	Also Bishop of Cornwall and Worcester; died in March 1046.
1046	1050	Leofric	Consecrated on 19 April 1046; also Bishop of Cornwall; became the first Bishop of Exeter in 1050.
In 1050, Leofric transferred the see to Exeter.

=== Pre-Reformation ===
Pre-Reformation Bishops of Exeter
From	Until	Incumbent	Notes
1050	1072	Leofric	The first to unite and transfer the Sees of Crediton and Cornwall to Exeter.
1071	1103	Osbern FitzOsbern	
1107	1138	William Warelwast	
1138	1155	Robert Warelwast	
1155	1160	Robert of Chichester	
1161	1184	Bartholomew Iscanus	
1186	1191	John the Chanter	
1194	1206	Henry Marshal	
1206	1214	vacant	See vacant due to Pope Innocent III's interdict against King John's realms
1214	1223	Simon of Apulia	
1224	1244	William Briwere	Aliter William Brewer
1245	1257	Richard Blund	
1258	1280	Walter Branscombe	Aliter Walter Bronescombe
1280	1291	Peter Quinel	Aliter Peter de Quivel or Quivil
1291	1307	Thomas Bitton	Aliter Thomas de Bytton
1308	1326	Walter de Stapledon	
1326	1327	James Berkeley	
1327		John Godeley	Also recorded as John Godele. Elected, but quashed
1327	1369	John Grandisson	
1370	1394	Thomas de Brantingham	Aliter Thomas Brantyngham
1395	1419	Edmund Stafford	
1419		John Catterick	Aliter John Ketterick, translated from Lichfield
1420	1455	Edmund Lacey	Also recorded as Edmund Lacy. Translated from Hereford
1455		John Hales	Appointed, but resigned before consecration
1458	1465	George Neville	Translated to York
1465	1478	John Booth	
1478	1487	Peter Courtenay	Translated to Winchester
1487	1492	Richard Foxe	Translated to Bath and Wells
1493	1495	Oliver King	Translated to Bath and Wells
1496	1502	Richard Redman	Translated from St Asaph; later translated to Ely
1502	1504	John Arundel	Translated from Lichfield
1505	1519	Hugh Oldham	

=== During the Reformation ===
Bishops of Exeter during the Reformation
From	Until	Incumbent	Notes
1519	1551	John Vesey	Deposed, Roman Catholic
1551	1553	Myles Coverdale	Protestant
1553	1554	John Vesey	Recovered, Roman Catholic
1555	1560	James Turberville	

=== Post-Reformation ===
Post-Reformation Bishops of Exeter
From	Until	Incumbent	Notes
1560	1571	William Alley	Also recorded as William Alleyn
1571	1578	William Bradbridge	
1579	1594	John Woolton	
1595	1597	Gervase Babington	Translated to Worcester
1598	1621	William Cotton	
1621	1626	Valentine Cary	
1627	1641	Joseph Hall	Translated to Norwich
1642	1646	Ralph Brownrigg	Deprived of the see when the English episcopacy was abolished by Parliament on 9 October 1646; died 1659.
1646	1660	The see was abolished during the Commonwealth and the Protectorate.	
1660	1662	John Gauden	Translated to Worcester
1662	1667	Seth Ward	Translated to Salisbury
1667	1676	Anthony Sparrow	Translated to Norwich
1676	1688	Thomas Lamplugh	Translated to York
1689	1707	Sir Jonathan Trelawny, Bt.	Translated from Bristol; later translated to Winchester
1708	1716	Ofspring Blackall	
1717	1724	Lancelot Blackburne	Translated to York
1724	1742	Stephen Weston	
1742	1746	Nicholas Clagett	Translated from St David's
1747	1762	George Lavington	
1762	1777	Frederick Keppel	
1778	1792	John Ross	
1792	1796	William Buller	
1797	1803	Reginald Courtenay	Translated from Bristol
1803	1807	John Fisher	Translated to Salisbury
1807	1820	George Pelham	Translated from Bristol; later translated to Lincoln
1820	1830	William Carey	Translated to St Asaph
1830		Christopher Bethell	Translated from Gloucester; later translated to Bangor
1831	1869	Henry Phillpotts	
1869	1885	Frederick Temple	Translated to London
1885	1900	Edward Bickersteth	
1901	1903	Herbert Edward Ryle	Translated to Winchester
1903	1916	Archibald Robertson	
1916	1936	Lord William Cecil	
1936	1948	Charles Curzon	Translated from Stepney
1949	1973	Robert Mortimer	
1973	1985	Eric Mercer	Translated from Birkenhead
1985	1999	Hewlett Thompson	Translated from Willesden
1999	2013	Michael Langrish	Translated from Birkenhead retired 30 June 2013
2014	2023	Robert Atwell	Translated from Stockport; retired 30 September 2023.
2024	present	Mike Harrison	Translated from Dunwich, 25 September 2024.

== Assistant bishops ==
Among those who have served as assistant bishops of the diocese have been:

- mid-1860s: James Chapman, Rector of Wootton Courtenay and former Bishop of Colombo
- 1900 – 1918 (d.): Alfred Earle, Dean of Exeter, remained Bishop of Marlborough despite resigning its duties as suffragan for West London
- While he was Rector of Down St Mary (1897–1903), Kestell Kestell-Cornish, retired Bishop of Madagascar, sometimes assisted the bishop
- 1947 – 1952 (ret.): Rocksborough Smith, Rector of Lapford and former Bishop of Algoma

== See also ==
- Armorial of bishops of Exeter
- Bishop of Cornwall

== Sources ==
- Some text adapted from Catholic Encyclopaedia, 1908.
