= Vernon Hill (sculptor) =

British sculptor (1887–1972)

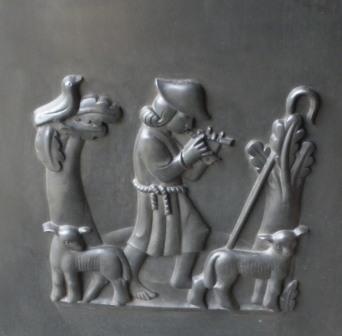
- Shepherding, Guildford Cathedral
- Born: 1887; Halifax, West Riding of Yorkshire
- Died: 1972 (aged 84–85); England
- Years active: 1910 - 1930
- Known for: Sculpture, illustration, lithography

Vernon Hill (1887–1972), born in Halifax, West Riding of Yorkshire, England, was a sculptor, lithographer, illustrator and draughtsman.

He began his work in print-making and lithography, and branched out into other artistic forms, such as sculpture. He illustrated several works and created etchings. His more notable works were commissions from Sir Edward Maufe for interior and exterior architectural sculptures on Maufe's buildings, including Guildford Cathedral, the Runnymede Memorial and several churches.

He died in 1972. (Note: Wolseley Fine Arts exhibition catalogue also gives 1972 as his date of death. According to Christie's, however, he died in 1953.)

== Early life ==
Vernon Hill was born in 1887 in Halifax, West Riding of Yorkshire. He began formal training in print-making at an early age; at the age 13 he was apprenticed to a lithographer. In about 1908, at the age of 21, Hill moved to London and took up poster illustration, working under John Hassall, a poster designer and illustrator.

From 1909 to 1914 Hill received commissions for work as an illustrator on various projects. He created Art Nouveau illustrations for an Arcadian Calendar for 1910 in 1909, Stephen Phillips' The New Inferno in 1911 and for Richard Pearse Chope's Ballads Weird and Wonderful the following year. In 1912 one of his works was exhibited at the Royal Academy of Arts. His etchings were described by Campbell Fine Art as follows:

The distinctive allegorical etchings of Vernon Hill are all now scarce. His highly evocative work appears to have evolved entirely independently from the trends of his time, although overtones of the mysticism which so influenced Frederick Carter and Austin Osman Spare can be traced in some of his works.

Chope commissioned Hill to create a series of designs for roof bosses at St Nectan's Church, Hartland in about 1912. The bosses are in three sets: two sets are of plants and trees, of which the first letter of each spell out the names of Chope's brothers (Dennis and Abbot). The third set are of biblical figures. Hill is thought to have sculpted these bosses, although some indicate they were created by Reads of Exeter.

== Notable commissions ==
His most notable work as a sculptor is to be seen on various buildings by Sir Edward Maufe, who regularly commissioned Hill.

=== Guildford Cathedral ===
Some of Hill's finest work can be seen at Guildford Cathedral in Guildford, Surrey, which was designed in 1932-33. Apart from the reliefs on the south door entrance, he carved the angels on the sedilia inside the cathedral, as well as the tongues of flame on the pulpit and lectern. He also carved the arms of Bishop Greig over the inside of the sacristy door and the figure of Saint Ursula over the inside of St Ursula's Porch.

At the east door of the south porch, on either side of the central buttress pier in the south transept, are two magnificent bronze doors, set under two arches, which feature Hill's reliefs. These are depictions of various occupations, of both men and women. The men's occupations are on the right-hand door and include sowing, woodcutting, fishing, hunting, shepherding and ploughing; on the left-hand door are depicted women's traditional occupations including milking, spinning, and teaching.

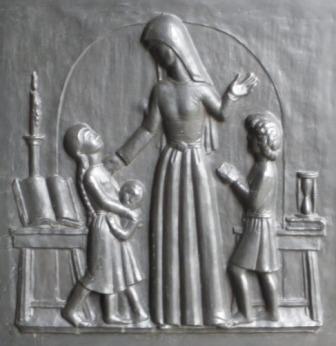
Teaching

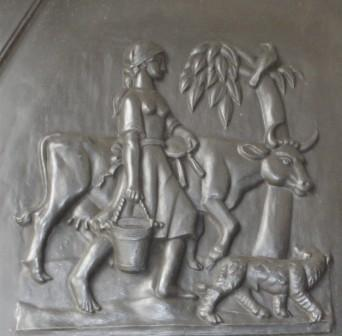
Milking

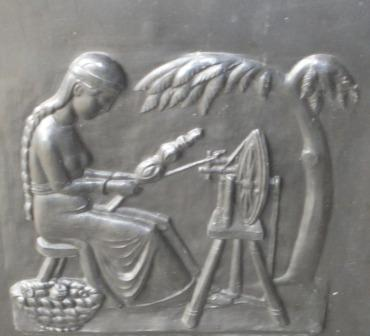
Spinning

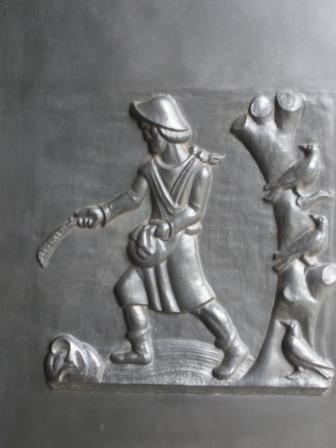
Sowing

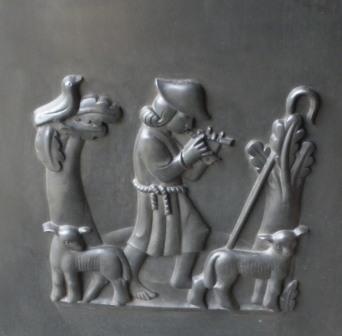
Shepherding

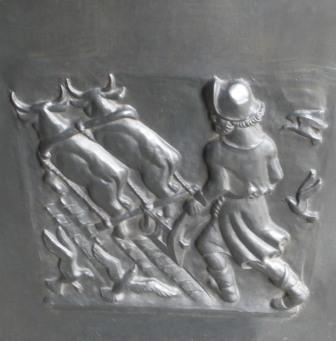
Ploughing

=== Runnymede Memorial ===
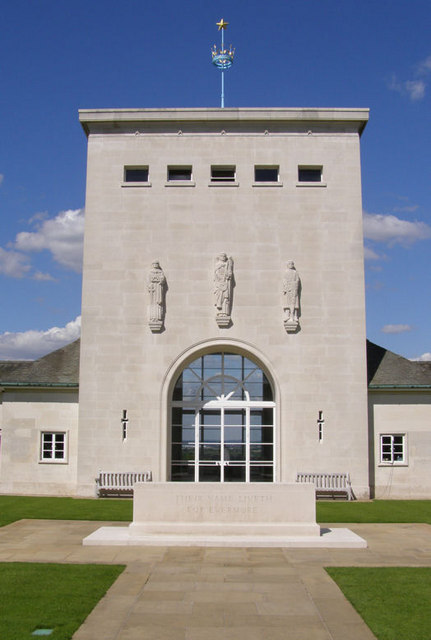
Royal Air Force Memorial, Runnymede, Surrey. Hill's works appear above the entrance

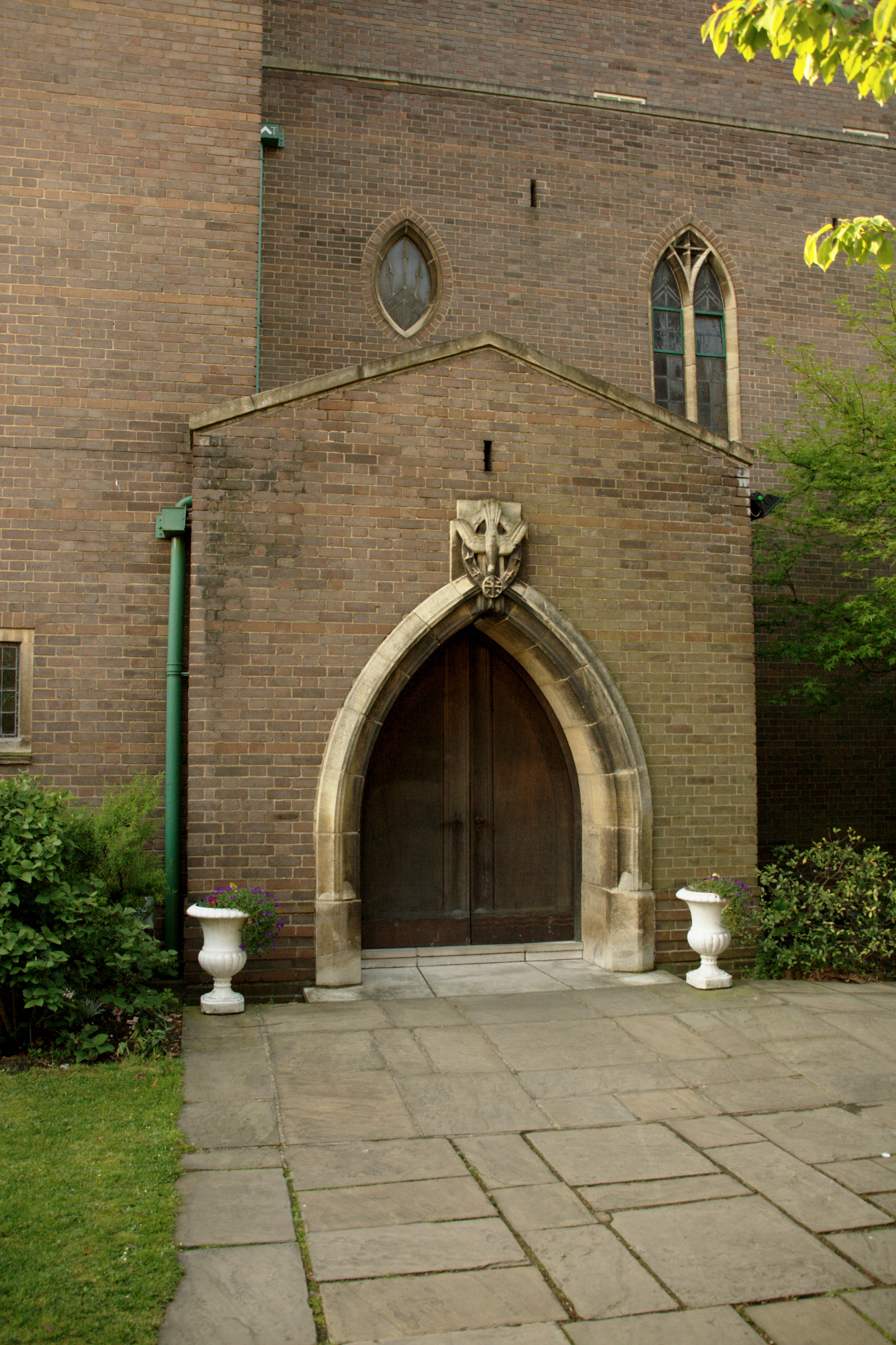
St Thomas the Apostle, Hanwell, keystone carving of a dove over north door

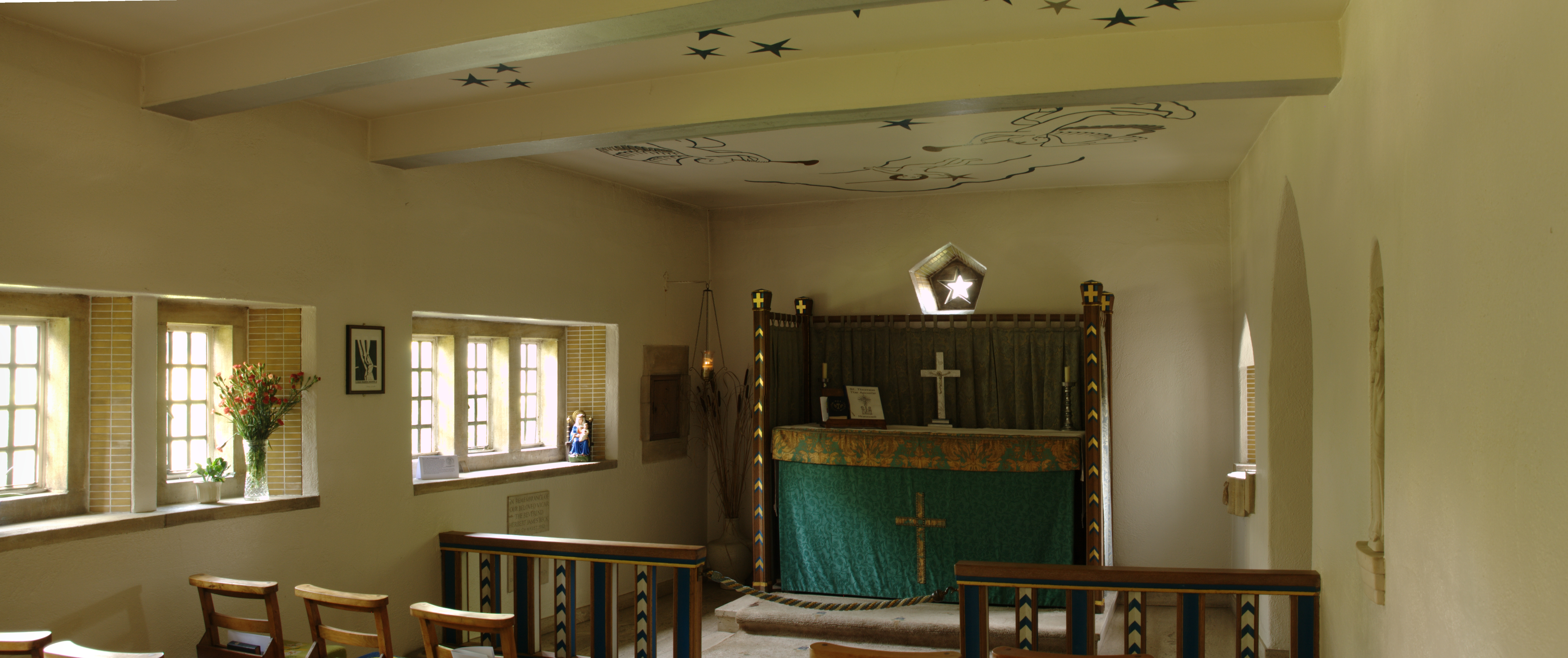
St Thomas the Apostle, Hanwell, Virgin and Child, carved in Caen stone, in the Morning Chapel

Hill sculpted the Air Forces Memorial at Runnymede, designed by Edward Maufe. Overlooking the Thames Valley, the memorial commemorates the more than 20,000 Royal Air Force servicemen and -women who died during World War II and have no known graves. The panels of inscriptions bear their names.

Among Hill's works are the architectural sculptures of Courage, Victory and Justice, which adorn the entry to the shrine on the north side of the triple arched portico by the cloisters.

=== St Columba's Church, London ===
Maufe was the architect for the re-building of St Columba's Church, Pont Street, London, which had been destroyed in 1941 during World War II. Hill provided interior and exterior stone sculptures for the construction between 1950 and 1955. Maufe described the finished work as "of an especial beauty."

=== St John's College, Cambridge ===
Also commissioned by Maufe, Hill completed an architectural sculpture of the arms of St John's College, Cambridge, for the north side of North Court.

=== Church of St Thomas the Apostle, Hanwell ===
Hill sculpted several works from Weldon stone for Maufe's church of St Thomas the Apostle, Hanwell. These included a sculpture of a dove over the north door and one of two birds eating a unch of grapes, depicting the Eucharist, over the west door. He also carved a Virgin and Child and a font. The font includes symbols for Christ, such as the ΙΧΘΥΣ cypher and an image of a fish. He also made a sculpture of Saint Christopher.

== Works ==
Work	Year	Type of work	Notes and References
A girl decked with leaves	1905–1930	Etching	The etching shows the head of a woman with leaves in her hair. It is printed with plate-tone in brown ink on speckled buff paper.
Air Maidens	1927 (exhibited)	Sculpture	The wooden figure group was exhibited at Sculpture, Drawings and Etchings by Vernon Hill (Leicester Galleries) in 1927.
Back of Hand-mirror	1927 (exhibited)	Sculpture	The bronze cast sculpture was exhibited at Leicester Galleries for the "Sculpture, Drawings and Etchings by Vernon Hill" exhibit.
Ballads Weird and Wonderful	1912	Illustrations	Hill illustrated a book of ancient legendary ballads by Richard Pearse Chope. (Note: Hill's artistic talents were described by Chope in the Foreword to Ballads Weird and Wonderful as follows: "[he] is an artist who is not limited to the actual things of life, whose fancy is not confined within the limits of a green field or a marble column - who, indeed, can see visions - whose inner life is not of our life but of a strange occult devising, is impelled irresistibly towards the supernatural.") For example, see "Young Benjie" (Roud 3911; Child 86).
Blind	1902–1915	Print	Walking in the dark is a ragged old man (etching and aquatint).
Crescent Moon	1927 (exhibited)	Sculpture	The lead sculpture was exhibited at Leicester Galleries for the "Sculpture, Drawings and Etchings by Vernon Hill" exhibit.
Dawn with Trumpet	1905–1924	Print	The etching, of an "allegorical figure in flowing rows blowing trumpet in doorway", is printed with plate-tone in brown ink.
Day joy	1927 (exhibited)	Sculpture	The bronze cast sculpture was exhibited at Leicester Galleries for the "Sculpture, Drawings and Etchings by Vernon Hill" exhibit.
Door Knocker	1927 (exhibited)	Architectural sculpture	The bronze cast door knocker was exhibited at Leicester Galleries for the "Sculpture, Drawings and Etchings by Vernon Hill" exhibit.
Elfin Crown	1927 (exhibited)	Sculpture	The bronze cast sculpture was exhibited at Leicester Galleries for the "Sculpture, Drawings and Etchings by Vernon Hill" exhibit.
Evening	1905–1915	Print	The work depicts two sitting figures: a woman sitting near a fire and a satyr holding a crook.
Fire	1905–1915	Print	The work, an etching, depicts a naked man walking in flames while shielding his face.
The Guardian	1905–1915	Print	A seated semi-nude angel is holding a branch of leaves and a trumpet. The work is an etching.
Mermaid	1927 (exhibited)	Sculpture	The carved animal bone sculpture was exhibited at Leicester Galleries for the "Sculpture, Drawings and Etchings by Vernon Hill" exhibit.
Moon Maidens	1927 (exhibited)	Sculpture	The wood carved sculpture was exhibited at Leicester Galleries for the "Sculpture, Drawings and Etchings by Vernon Hill" exhibit.
Moon Maidens	1930 (exhibited)	Sculpture	The bronze sculpture was exhibited at Leeds City Art Gallery, Yorkshire Artists' Exhibition in 1928.
Morning Gladness	1927 (exhibited)	Sculpture	The bronze cast sculpture was exhibited at Leicester Galleries for the "Sculpture, Drawings and Etchings by Vernon Hill" exhibit.
Night	1927 (exhibited)	Sculpture	The carved stone sculpture was exhibited at Leicester Galleries for the "Sculpture, Drawings and Etchings by Vernon Hill" exhibit.
Nymph	1927 (exhibited)	Sculpture	The bronze cast sculpture was exhibited at Leicester Galleries for the "Sculpture, Drawings and Etchings by Vernon Hill" exhibit.
Rapture	1927 (exhibited)	Sculpture	The bronze cast sculpture was exhibited at Leicester Galleries for the "Sculpture, Drawings and Etchings by Vernon Hill" exhibit.
Roaring flame	1927 (exhibited)	Sculpture	The bronze cast sculpture was exhibited at Leicester Galleries for the "Sculpture, Drawings and Etchings by Vernon Hill" exhibit.
Sea Frolic	1927 (exhibited)	Print	The work is a photomechanical print invitation of three entwined mermaids for the Leicester Galleries Exhibition of Sculpture, Drawings and Etchings by Vernon Hill in 1927.
Sorrow	1927 (exhibited)	Sculpture	The carved marble sculpture was exhibited at Leicester Galleries for the "Sculpture, Drawings and Etchings by Vernon Hill" exhibit.
St Joan of Arc's Church sculpture	Unknown	Sculpture	Hill made a sculpture for the church; further details are unknown.
The Arcadian Calendar	1909	Illustration	The calendar is believed to contain Hill's first commissioned illustrations. The work was published by John Lane The Bodley Head.
The Awakening	1930 (exhibited)	Sculpture	The bronze sculpture was exhibited at Leeds City Art Gallery, Yorkshire Artists' Exhibition in 1930.
The Chase	1928 (exhibited)	Sculpture	The bronze sculpture was exhibited at Leeds City Art Gallery, Yorkshire Artists' Exhibition in 1928.
The Flower of Silence	1927 (exhibited)	Sculpture	The carved wood sculpture was exhibited at Leicester Galleries for the "Sculpture, Drawings and Etchings by Vernon Hill" exhibit.
The Mask	1927 (exhibited)	Sculpture	The bronze cast sculpture was exhibited at Leicester Galleries for the "Sculpture, Drawings and Etchings by Vernon Hill" exhibit.
The Messenger	1905–1915	Print	The work depicts a man naked except for winged sandals flying above the mountains while carrying a banner.
The Moon Chariot	1927 (exhibited)	Sculpture	The lead sculpture was exhibited at Leicester Galleries for the "Sculpture, Drawings and Etchings by Vernon Hill" exhibit.
The New Inferno	1910	Illustration	Hill created Art Nouveau illustrations for S. Phillips' The New Inferno in 1911.
The Spirit that destroyed Rheims	1905–1915	Print	An etching, made on cream paper, depicting a figure brandishing a sword while bursting through flames.
The Sun God	1927 (exhibited)	Sculpture	The carved stone sculpture was exhibited at Leicester Galleries for the "Sculpture, Drawings and Etchings by Vernon Hill" exhibit.
The Wave	1927 (exhibited)	Sculpture	The carved marble sculpture was exhibited at Leicester Galleries for the "Sculpture, Drawings and Etchings by Vernon Hill" exhibit.
The Wheel	1927 (exhibited)	Sculpture	The bronze cast sculpture was exhibited at Leicester Galleries for the "Sculpture, Drawings and Etchings by Vernon Hill" exhibit.
The woman-wind asleep	1927 (exhibited)	Sculpture	The lead sculpture was exhibited at Leicester Galleries for the "Sculpture, Drawings and Etchings by Vernon Hill" exhibit.
Tramping with a Poet through the Rockies	Before 1922	Illustrations	Hill illustrated the travel journal of authors Vachel Lindsay and Stephen Graham through the United States and Canadian Rockies, with stops at an Indian reservation and a Mormon temple.
Wind Helmet	1927 (exhibited)	Sculpture	The bronze cast sculpture was exhibited at Leicester Galleries for the "Sculpture, Drawings and Etchings by Vernon Hill" exhibit.

== Exhibitions ==
Hill exhibited:

1927 - Multiple works at Leicester Galleries: Sculpture, Drawings and Etchings by Vernon Hill
1928 - Multiple works at Leeds City Art Gallery, Yorkshire Artists' Exhibition
1930 - The Awakening at Leeds City Art Gallery, Yorkshire Artists' Exhibition
