= Church Songs =

1884 Anglican hymnal

Church Songs is an 1884 collection of hymns and songs composed and compiled for Church of England and Episcopal Church usage by Sabine Baring-Gould, in collaboration with Henry Fleetwood Sheppard. Church Songs was intended to provide a church substitute for the phenomenally successful 1877 Moody-Sankey hymn book. At the time Baring-Gould was parish priest at Lew Trenchard, Devonshire. The book was published by Skeffington in England and in New York by James Pott and Co., also in 1884.
