= The Revenge of Joseph Noirel =

1870 novel by Victor Cherbuilez

The Revenge of Joseph Noirel (French: La Revanche de Joseph Noirel) is a novel by Victor Cherbuliez, published in 1870.

== Synopsis ==
The scene is laid at Mon Plaisir, near Geneva, the villa-home of the well-to-do bourgeois manufacturer, M. Merion, whose wife has social ambitions of which the daughter Mademoiselle Marguerite is made the innocent victim. Given in a marriage of convenience to M. le Conte d'Orins, she finds the unhappiness of a union without love intensified into horror and dread by the suspicion that her husband has been guilty of a hidden crime. Meanwhile, the hero of the story, Joseph Noirel, is the trusted overseer in the works of M. Merion; having been gradually promoted to this position of responsibility and esteem from that of the starving child of disgraced parents, whom the village crier had rescued and introduced as an apprentice in the factory. On Mademoiselle Marguerite's returning from her years of training in the convent for the aristocratic life to which her mother had destined her, Joseph is captivated by her beauty; and after being thrown together by the accident of a storm, he becomes the hopeless victim of a devouring but unrequited love for her. The marriage with the count having taken place, Joseph becomes aware of the crime of which the husband is guilty, and informs Marguerite, who flees for refuge to Mon Plaisir ('my pleasure'). The count meanwhile creates the suspicion that it is a guilty attachment on the part of Marguerite for Joseph which has brought her there, and her parents indignantly reject her plea for their protection. A word from her would reveal her husband's crime and would cost his life. Meanwhile, Joseph has already resolved to end his hopeless misery by taking his own life. Marguerite maintains her silence, obeys her husband, and leaves her father's house. She asks Joseph to become the instrument of her death before taking his own life, and under circumstances that would imply guilt, while yet she remains innocent, and the saviour of her husband's life and honour.

== Appraisal ==
Helen Rex Keller called the novel "A lively and skillful character sketch by this master of literary portraiture; who here, as in Jean Têterol's Idea, takes for his theme the moral unrest caused by social class distinctions, but carries the development of his theme to a tragic extreme." She continues, "The narration of this climax of the story's action is in the highest plane of dramatic writing, and is a remarkable exhibition of the author's power of reserve, and of his ability to suggest the hidden reality beneath expressed unreality."

== Sources ==
- Budd, Louis J. (1952). "W. D. Howells' Defense of the Romance". PMLA, 67(2). p. 32. JSTOR. Accessed 14 June 2023.

Attribution:

- Keller, Helen Rex (1917). "Revenge of Joseph Noirel, The". The Reader's Digest of Books. The Library of the World's Best Literature. New York: The Macmillan Company. pp. 726–727.
