= Richard Cable =

1888 novel

Richard Cable: The Lightshipman is a novel by Sabine Baring-Gould, published in 1888.

== Synopsis ==
Richard Cable is the keeper of a light-ship on the coast of Essex, England. He is a widower, and father of a family of seven children, all girls. During a storm Josephine Cornellis, a young lady of the neighbourhood, whose home is not particularly happy, is blown out to the light-ship in a small boat, and rescued by Cable.

Richard, being a moralist, gives advice to Josephine, who loses her heart to him. Events so shape themselves that she places herself under his guidance, and the two are married; but almost immediately Richard finds himself in a false position because he is not accustomed to the usages of society, and Josephine too feels mortified by her husband's mistakes. A separation takes place, Richard sailing round the coast to Cornwall, and taking his mother, the children, and all his belongings. Josephine repents; and as she cannot raise him to her sphere, decides to adapt herself to his. She goes into service as a lady's-maid. More complications ensue, and Richard, who has become a prosperous cattle-dealer, appears opportunely and takes her away from her situation. While he still hates her, he desires to provide for her. This she will not allow; but is anxious to regain his love, and continues to earn her living and endeavour to retrieve her great mistake. Eventually, at his own request, they are remarried.

== Appraisal ==
According to Helen Rex Keller, "There are several other interesting characters necessary to the working out of a plot somewhat complicated in minor details, but the burden of the story is concerning ill-assorted marriages and ensuing complications, — hardness of heart, pride, malice, and all uncharitableness."

== Sources ==
- Riches, Christopher; Cox, Michael (2015). "Baring-Gould, S.". A Dictionary of Writers and their Works. Oxford University Press.

Attribution:

- Keller, Helen Rex (1917). "Richard Cable". The Reader's Digest of Books. The Library of the World's Best Literature. New York: The Macmillan Company. p. 729.
