= The Gaverocks =

1887 novel by Sabine Baring-Gould

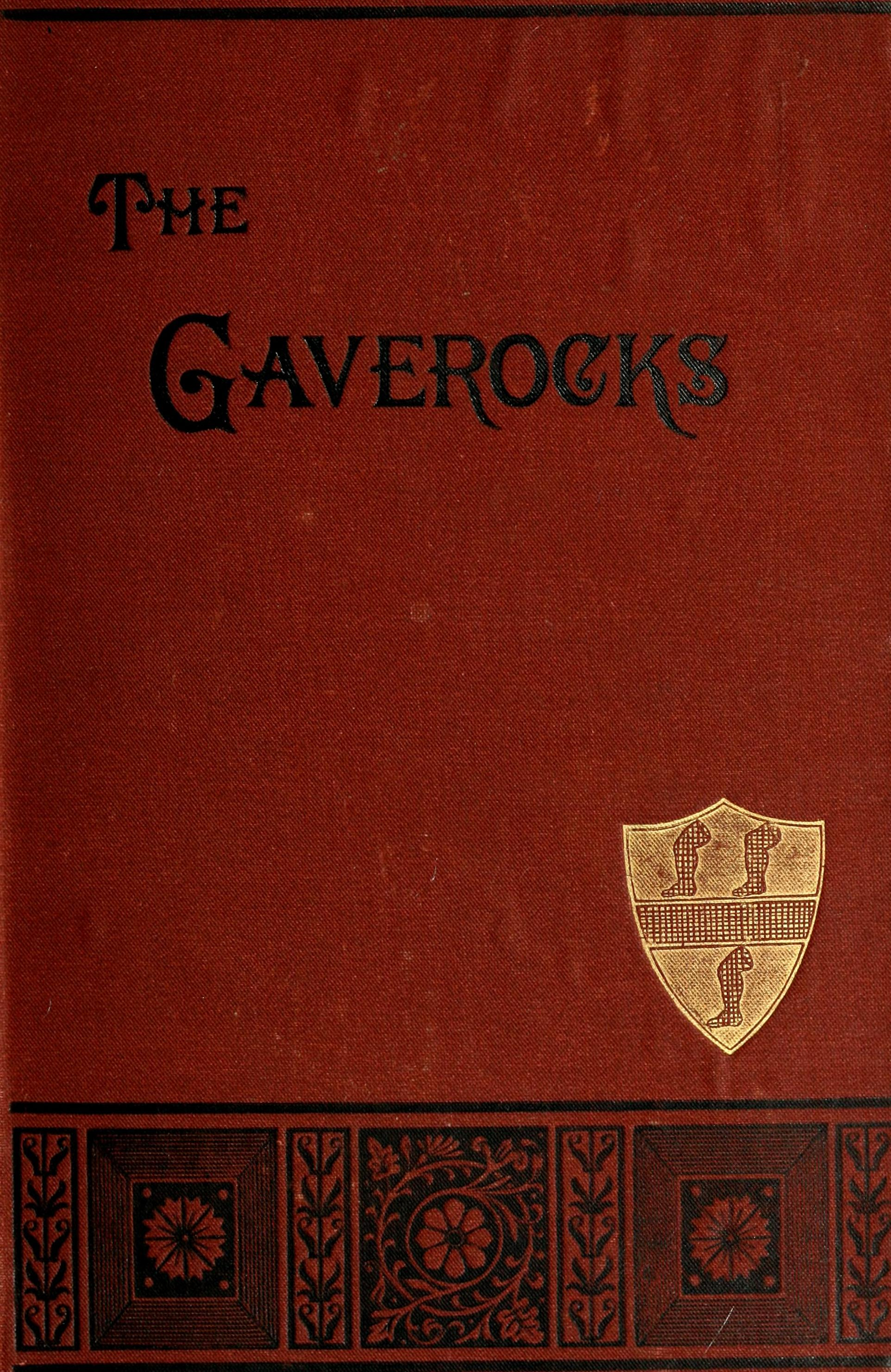
- Cover of the 1st edition
- Author: Sabine Baring-Gould
- Language: English
- Published: 1887
- Publisher: Smith, Elder, & Co.
- Publication place: London, England, United Kingdom
- Media type: Hardcover
- Pages: 298 (vols. I and II), 271 (vol. III)
- OCLC: 13305289

The Gaverocks: A Tale of the Cornish Coast is an 1887 novel by English priest and scholar Sabine Baring-Gould.

== Synopsis ==
Hender Gaverock is an eccentric old Cornish squire, who has two sons, Garens and Constantine, whose natural spirits have been almost wholly crushed by his harsh and brutal rule. Garens philosophically submits, but Constantine rebels; and the book is chiefly occupied with the misdeeds, and their consequences, of the younger son, whose revolt against his father's tyranny rapidly degenerates into a career of vice and crime. He marries secretly, deserts his wife, allows himself to be thought drowned, commits bigamy, robs his father, and is finally murdered as he is about to flee the country.

== Analysis ==
According to Helen Rex Keller, "The Gaverocks is one of the tales of English rural life and studies of distorted development of character, mingled with a touch of the supernatural, in which the author excels. ... Exciting events come thick and fast, and the various complications of the plot gradually unravel themselves. The chief characters are boldly and forcibly drawn, and the scenes on both land and water are vividly portrayed; notably the storm in which Constantine and his father are wrecked, the 'Goose Fair,' and Garens's samphire gathering. The interest is sustained to the end, and the book as a whole is a powerful one, though it can hardly be called pleasant or agreeable."

== Sources ==
- Baring-Gould, Sabine (1887). The Gaverocks: A Tale of the Cornish Coast. 3 vols. London: Smith, Elder, & Co. Vol. 1, Vol. 2, Vol. 3.
- Hahn, Daniel; Robins, Nicholas (2008). "Baring‐Gould, Sabine". In The Oxford Guide to Literary Britain & Ireland. Oxford University Press. Retrieved 11 November 2022.

Attribution:

- Keller, Helen Rex (1924). "Gaverocks, The". In The Reader's Digest of Books. The Library of the World's Best Literature. New York: The Macmillan Company. p. 335.
