= Richard Hansford Worth =

English civil engineer and geologist (1868–1950)

Richard Hansford Worth (5 November 1868 – 11 November 1950) of Plymouth, Devon was a civil engineer, geologist, archaeologist and writer on Dartmoor. He was the author of numerous papers published by the Devonshire Association some of which became the basis of the book Worth’s Dartmoor published posthumously.

== Early life ==
R. Hansford Worth was the son of Lydia Amelia Davies and the geologist, antiquarian and historian Richard Nicholls Worth. He was educated at Plymouth High School for Boys (later called Plymouth College). After leaving school he joined the engineering staff at Great Western Railway at Paddington. He returned to Plymouth in 1890 and set up in private practise as a civil engineer. In 1907 Worth married Miss Annie E. Kingwell of South Brent.

Worth adopted many of the interests of his father including a passion for geology, archaeology and Dartmoor. He was a founding member of the Marine Biological Society, a member of the Institution of Civil Engineers and the Mineralogical Society, and a fellow of the Geological Society of London.

He joined the Plymouth Institution in 1888 and he shortly afterwards presented his first paper to them on Early Western Railways. The following year he presented one of his first papers on archaeology on Dartmoor, The Moorland Plym, a paper detailing cists that had been discovered along the River Plym. In 1904 he became the President of the Plymouth Institution and he was made an Honorary Member in 1937. For many years he was their Curator of Geology and Petrology.In 1932 he was awarded the Bolitho Medal of the Royal Geological Society of Cornwall.

== Dartmoor and the Devonshire Association ==
Worth followed his father in becoming very active in the Devonshire Association which he joined in 1891. In 1893 Robert Burnard and Sabine Baring-Gould started archaeological excavations at Grimspound. The co-option of Richard Nicholls Worth, R. Hansford Worth and Dr Gray led to the formation of the Dartmoor Exploration Committee of the Devonshire Association. Worth drew the plan of Grimspound in the committee's first report. The committee carried out very numerous excavations of prehistoric round houses during the 1890s up until 1906. Worth became the secretary of the Dartmoor Exploration Committee and played a major role in the work of the committee which disbanded after his death in 1950. The committee was responsible for the restoration of many Dartmoor stone rows and stone circles. The restorations being carried out to protect the ancient monuments from being robbed for stone.

In 1879 Worth's father had been involved in forming the Barrow Committee of the Devonshire Association which published annual reports. After his father's death, Worth picked up and continued these annual reports with his own research. This was also the case with a series of reports started by his father on The Stone Rows of Dartmoor that documented the many stone rows that were being discovered on Dartmoor at the time. In 1906 he started his annual Climate Reports which along with the annual Barrow Reports continued until his death in 1950.

In 1930 Worth became President of the Devonshire Association and in that year he submitted a major paper on The Physical Geography of Dartmoor. In the obituary published by the Devonshire Association in 1951 it was estimated that during his time writing for them he had written on more than forty subjects.

== Worth's Dartmoor ==
Worth had intended to gather his writings on Dartmoor into a book and a number of the articles written for the Transactions of the Devonshire Association were written with the intention of becoming chapters for a book on Dartmoor. He died before being able to complete this task but he left a sum of money and instructions in his will for the publication of such a book with the proceeds of the sales to go to the Devonshire Association. The first version was published privately in 1953 and it was re-published in 1967.

== R H Worth Award ==
Another legacy executed at the wishes of Worth as expressed in his will is the annual R H Worth award established by the Geological Society in 1955. It was to confer recognition of achievements in outreach, public engagement and/or education carried out by an individual or an institution. This award is still made annually.
