= Henry Fleetwood Sheppard =

Henry Fleetwood Sheppard (London, 5 February 1824 – November 1901) was an English clergyman who collaborated on the collection Church Songs (1884) with Sabine Baring-Gould.

Born in London on 5 February 1824, Sheppard graduated from Cambridge University in 1855 and was ordained as an Anglican minister the next year. For many years, he was the precentor and editor to the Doncaster Church Choral Union. Sheppard eventually became the Rector of Thurnscoe in South Yorkshire

Sheppard published many pieces of church music, including Gregorian chants and hymns. Sheppard also collaborated with Baring-Gould on Songs of the West, which contains folk songs from Devon and Cornwall. Songs of the West was published by Methuen Publishing in conjunction with Watey and Willis; the first edition appeared both as a four-part set, undated, and as one volume dated 1895.

A new edition contained songs that were omitted from first edition, with the music being edited by Cecil Sharp. The second edition mentions the third collaborator, the Rev. Dr. F. W. Bussell. The Plymouth City Library collection includes two manuscript volumes with 202 songs with music. The publishers censored the language in some of the songs so that they would not offend the Victorian audience.
