= The Lives of the Saints (Baring-Gould) =

Collection of saints' biographies, 1872–1877

The Lives of the Saints is a sixteen-volume collection of lives of the saints by Sabine Baring-Gould, first published between 1872 and 1877 by John Hodges, of London, and later republished in Edinburgh in 1914.

The volumes are arranged according to the month of each saint's principal feast day.

== Volumes ==
- The Lives of the Saints: Volume I - January
- The Lives of the Saints: Volume II - February
- The Lives of the Saints: Volume III - March
- The Lives of the Saints: Volume IV - April
- The Lives of the Saints: Volume V - May
- The Lives of the Saints: Volume VI - June
- The Lives of the Saints: Volume VII - July Pt. 1
- The Lives of the Saints: Volume VII - July Pt. 2
- The Lives of the Saints: Volume VIII - August
- The Lives of the Saints: Volume IX - September
- The Lives of the Saints: Volume X - October Pt. 1
- The Lives of the Saints: Volume X - October Pt. 2
- The Lives of the Saints: Volume XI - November Pt. 1
- The Lives of the Saints: Volume XI - November Pt. 2
- The Lives of the Saints: Volume XII - December
- The Lives of the Saints: Volume XIII - Appendix
