= St Thomas the Apostle, Hanwell =

St Thomas the Apostle
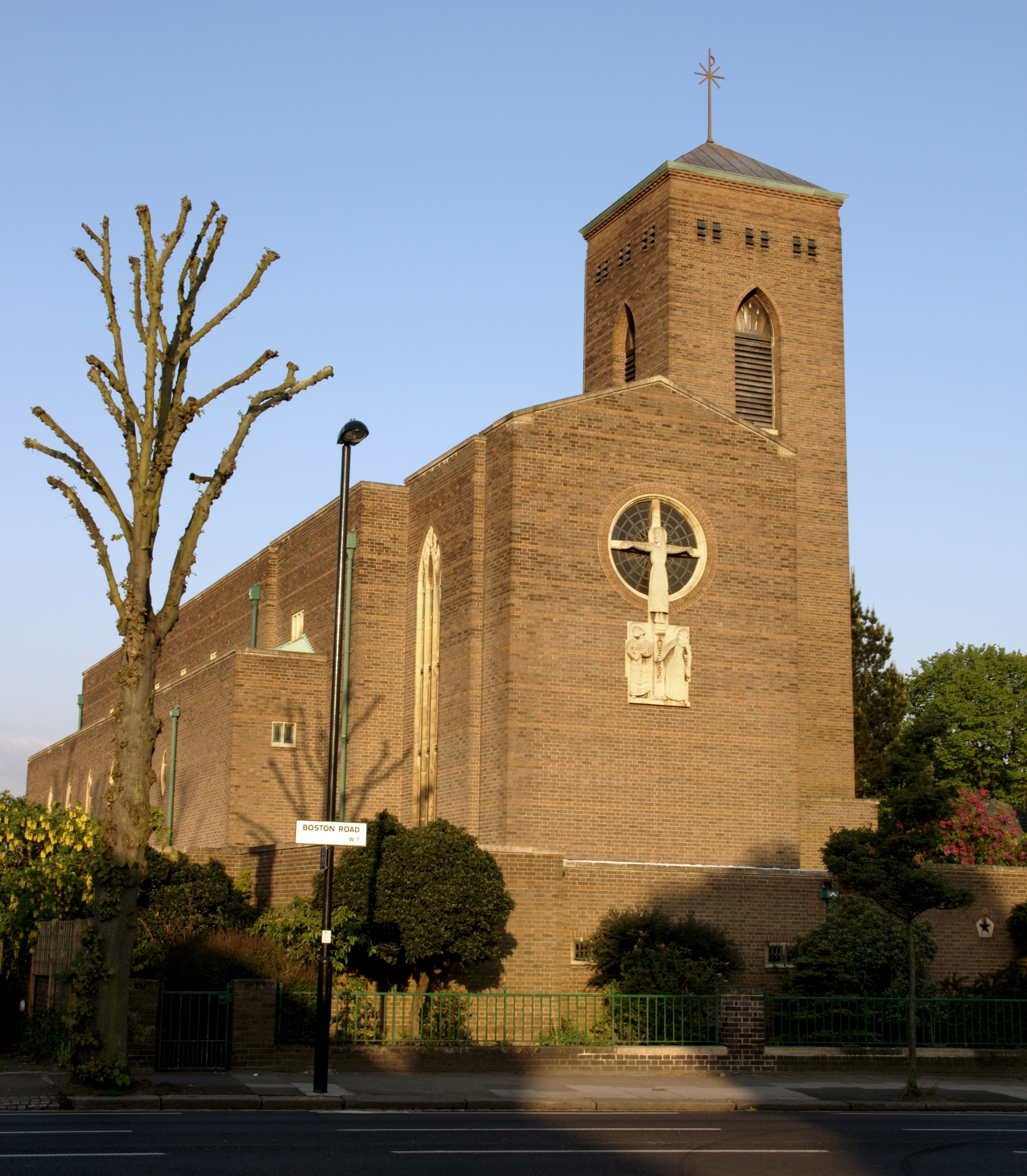
- The east face.
- St Thomas the Apostle
- 51.5012°N 0.3303°W
- Location: St Thomas the Apostle Parish Office, 182 Boston Road Hanwell London W7 2AD
- Country: England
- Denomination: Church of England
- Churchmanship: Traditional Catholic
- Website: Parish website

History
- Founded: Foundation stone was laid on 8 July 1933

Architecture
- Architect: Edward Maufe
- Style: Gothic/Art Deco
- Years built: July 1934

Administration
- Diocese: Diocese of London
- Archdeaconry: Archdeaconry of Northolt

Clergy
- Vicar: Reverend Julia Palmer

St Thomas the Apostle is a Church of England church, which is situated along Boston Road in Hanwell, in the London Borough of Ealing. Designed by Sir Edward Maufe, It forms part of the Diocese of London and can hold 428 people. English Heritage has listed it as a Grade II* building.

== History ==
Hanwell was a small village which began to expand – slowly at first – with the arrival of the Great Western Railway in the 1850s. Much of the new residential development was around where the Uxbridge Road crossed the parish of St Mary and then to the south of it. The resulting increase in souls living in the area thus necessitated the creation of a new parish, that of St Mellitus and formed in 1908. It is situated on the corner of Uxbridge Road and Church Road. The parish lies between the GWR railway and Elthorne Park. In 1906 a new tram line came into service. Running along the Boston Road from Hanwell to Brentford it encouraged more people to take up residence in this more southern part of Hanwell. With the rapidly increasing population, the southernmost part of the old parish of St Mary now needed to become a parish in its own right. St Thomas was up and till then an iron mission church setting up to maybe 300 people. Money was raised by selling off the site of St Thomas in Orchard Street (just off Portman Square but before Oxford Street) and the foundation stone of the new parish church of St Thomas the Apostle was laid 8 July 1933. It opened the following year.

=== Present day ===
The parish is within the Willesden Episcopal Area of the Church of England's Diocese of London. From 1995 to 2011, as a traditionalist Anglo-Catholic church that rejected the ordination of women as priests, the parish received alternative episcopal oversight from the Bishop of Fulham. In 2011, it rescinded the resolutions, and now receives episcopal oversight from the local area bishop and welcomes women priests.

== Design and construction ==
The architect was Sir Edward Brantwood Maufe. The building is on a north east axis with a tall square north-east bell tower with a green copper cap sitting astride the northern wall. The exterior of the building is executed in simple lines and is constructed of brown-silver-grey engineering bricks; reputed to have come from Tondu in Wales. A carving of the Calvary by Eric Gill is on the north-east face and incorporates the east window. With the aid of a platform built from scaffolding, Gill was able to carve this in situ from a single block of limestone. There is a carved keystone in the arch of the north east entrance which is the work of Vernon Hill.

The interior, in contrast to the straight lines of the outside, has plain curvilinear Gothic piers which draw the eyes up to a high fan vaulted ceiling. Standing at the west end of the nave one can see that by Maufe placing the bell tower to one side, he has been able to keep the ceiling in one level plain so increasing the sense of spaciousness. The vaults are formed from reinforced concrete. Since this was still a relatively novel building technique it could be said that this building was to test this method of construction, before using it on his proposed design for the forthcoming Guildford Cathedral. Maufe developed the technique further in his work at St Mary's Church, Hampden Park, Eastbourne, which he rebuilt in 1952–54.

Also placed centrally at the west end of the nave, is the straight sided octagonal stone font, this is also the work of Vernon Hill. At the centre of its simple design is carved a symbolic motif of a fish entwine around an anchored cross with the Koine Greek acronym ΙΧΘΥΣ inscribed vertically down the left side.

High in the west window, the glass has been shaped in the centre panel so that the lead came forms the Labarum symbol of Chi (χ) and Rho (ρ).

The aisles and each side are delineated by having pointed archways in each of the supporting piers. When standing at the end of either of these aisles from the well west end they each form a passage which passes through areas of increasing shadow along their length. This gives the illusion that the two windows at the eastern end are shining bright stars, even though they are letting in just ordinary daylight. The main windows are all lancets of clear handmade leaded glass. Maufe's choice, not to use mass-produced glass, shows the influence at the time of the Arts and Crafts movement.

With such a wide range of light and shadow: vistas that change with the position of the observer, Maufe has given a spatial richness to the building which is normally only found in large ancient cathedrals. Yet with the plainness of form and the Art Deco fittings it is thoroughly modern.

The motif of Thomas the saint, is a fan of three spears with a builder's square. This motif has been incorporated as a recurrent theme into the lancet windows and into the leaded oval clerestory window above the porch way. Spears and a square from the iron gates each side of the east wall – behind which there is a cross passage. It also appears again on the cast iron rainheads on the exterior of the building.

Architectural details of St Thomas the Apostle
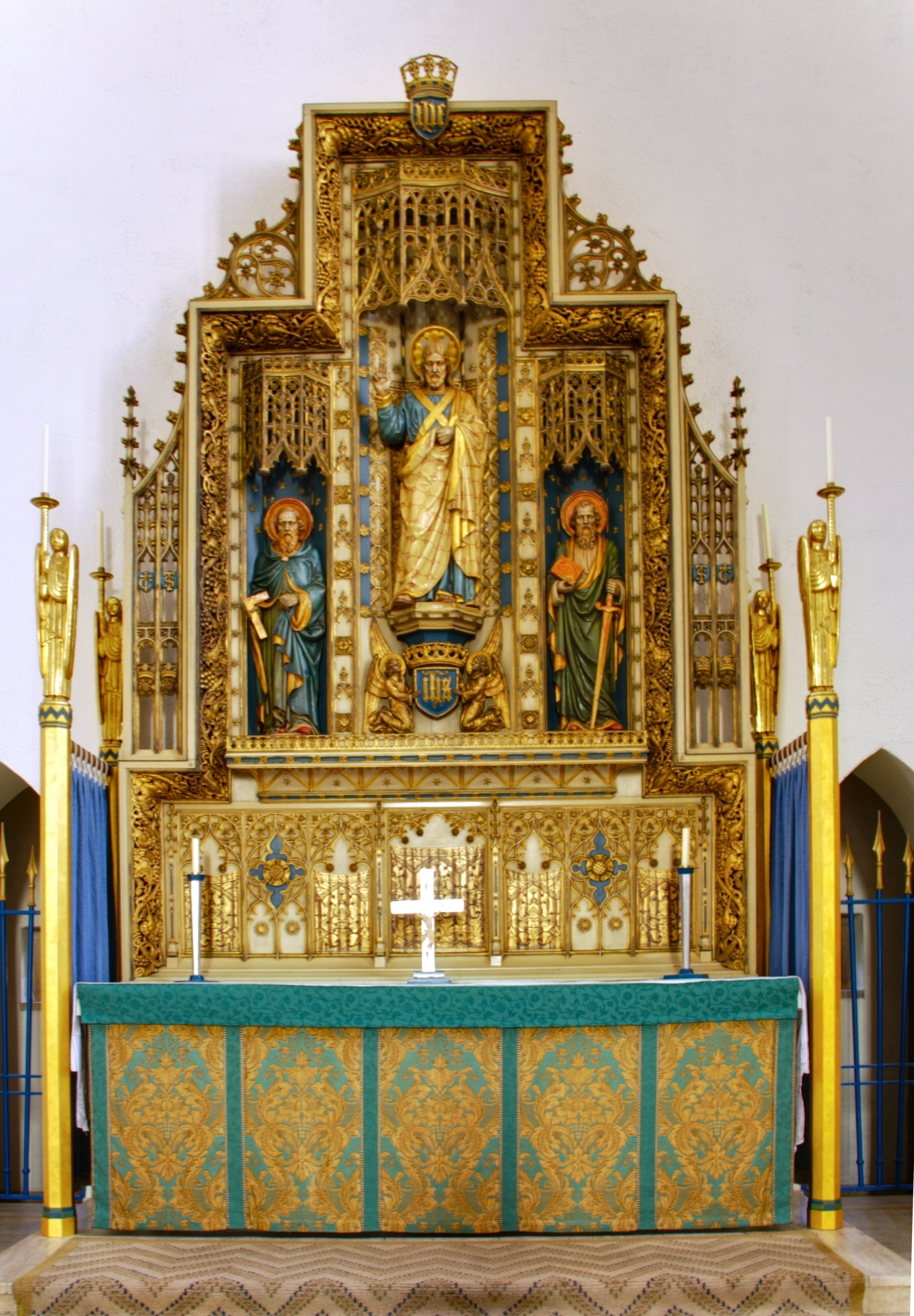
The reredos at the east end. Removed from St Thomas's , Portman Square made to the design of Cecil Greenwood Hare, Bodley's last partner and successor to his practice.

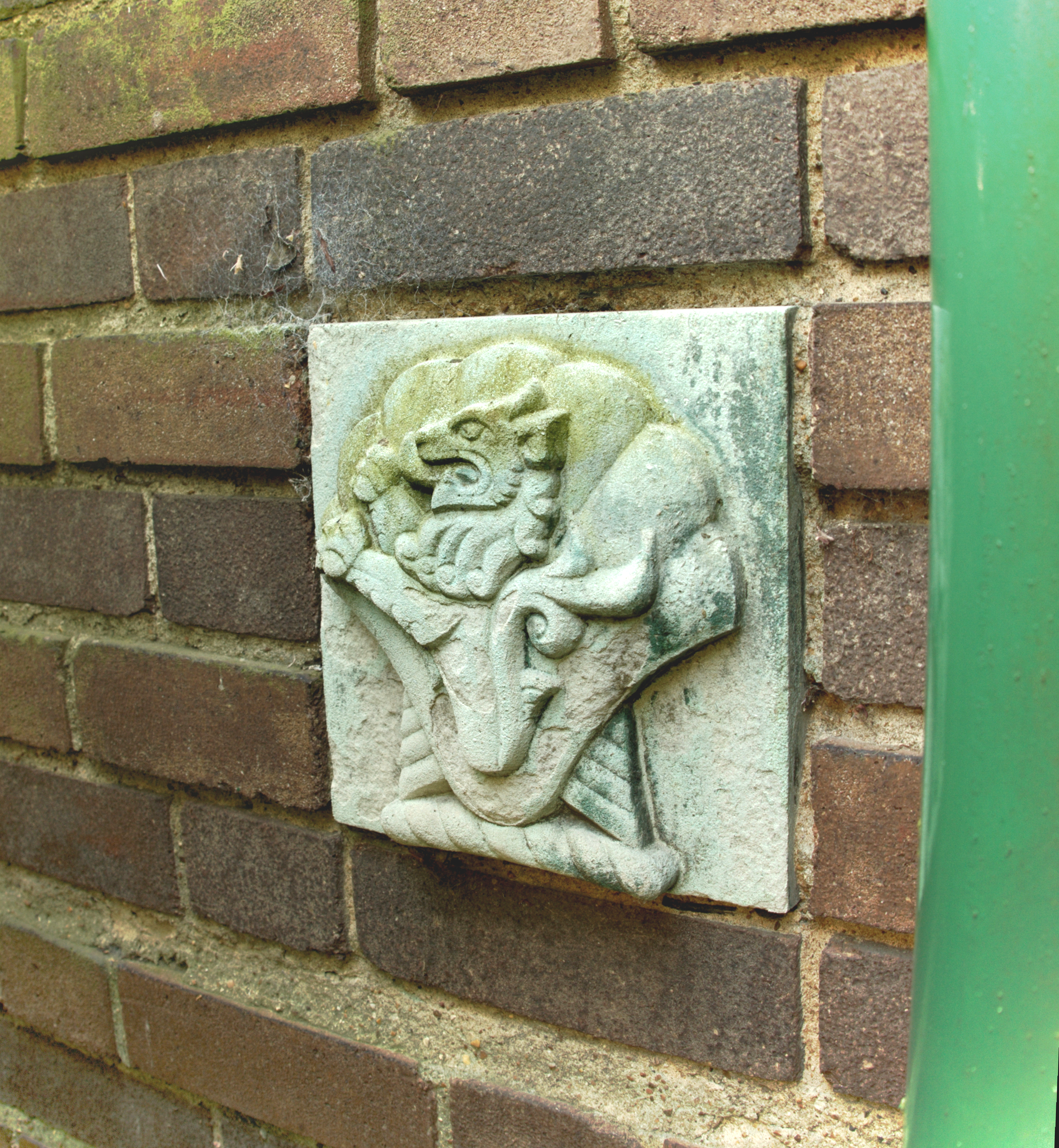
Sir Edward Brantwood Maufe's stone seal at the base of the tower.

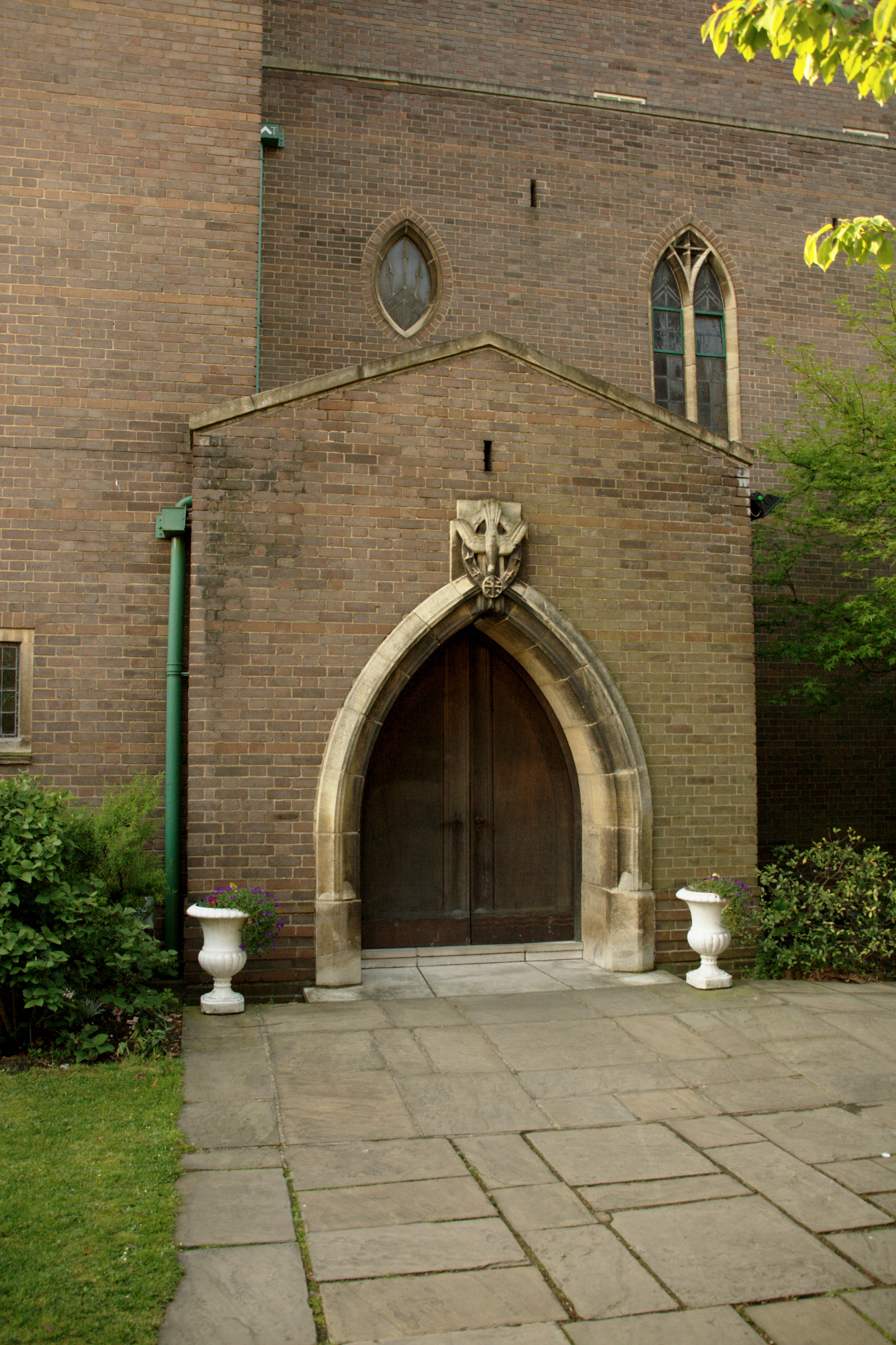
The keystone carving of a dove over the north door is by Vernon Hill.

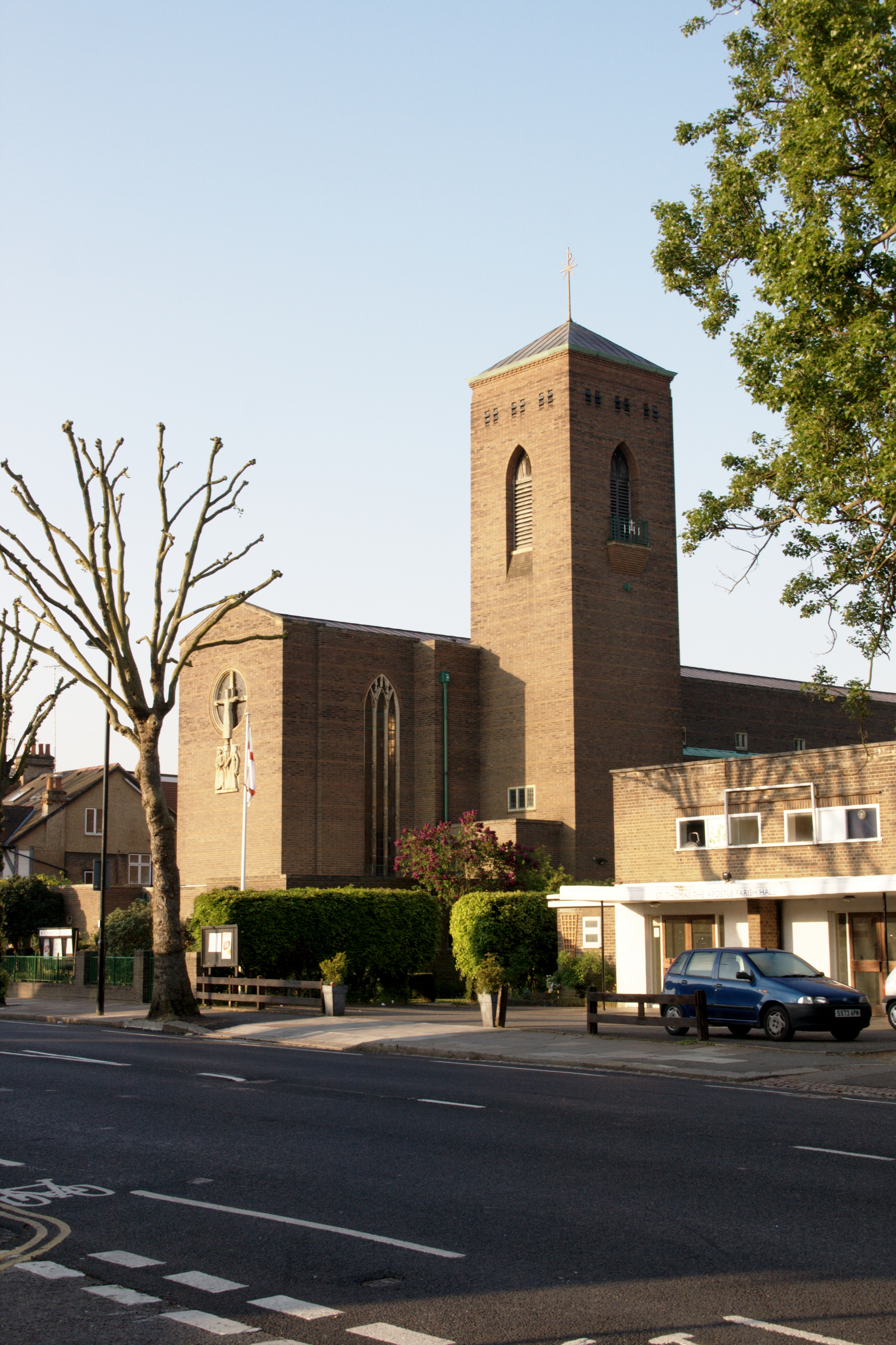
The north east corner with the Church Hall on the right.

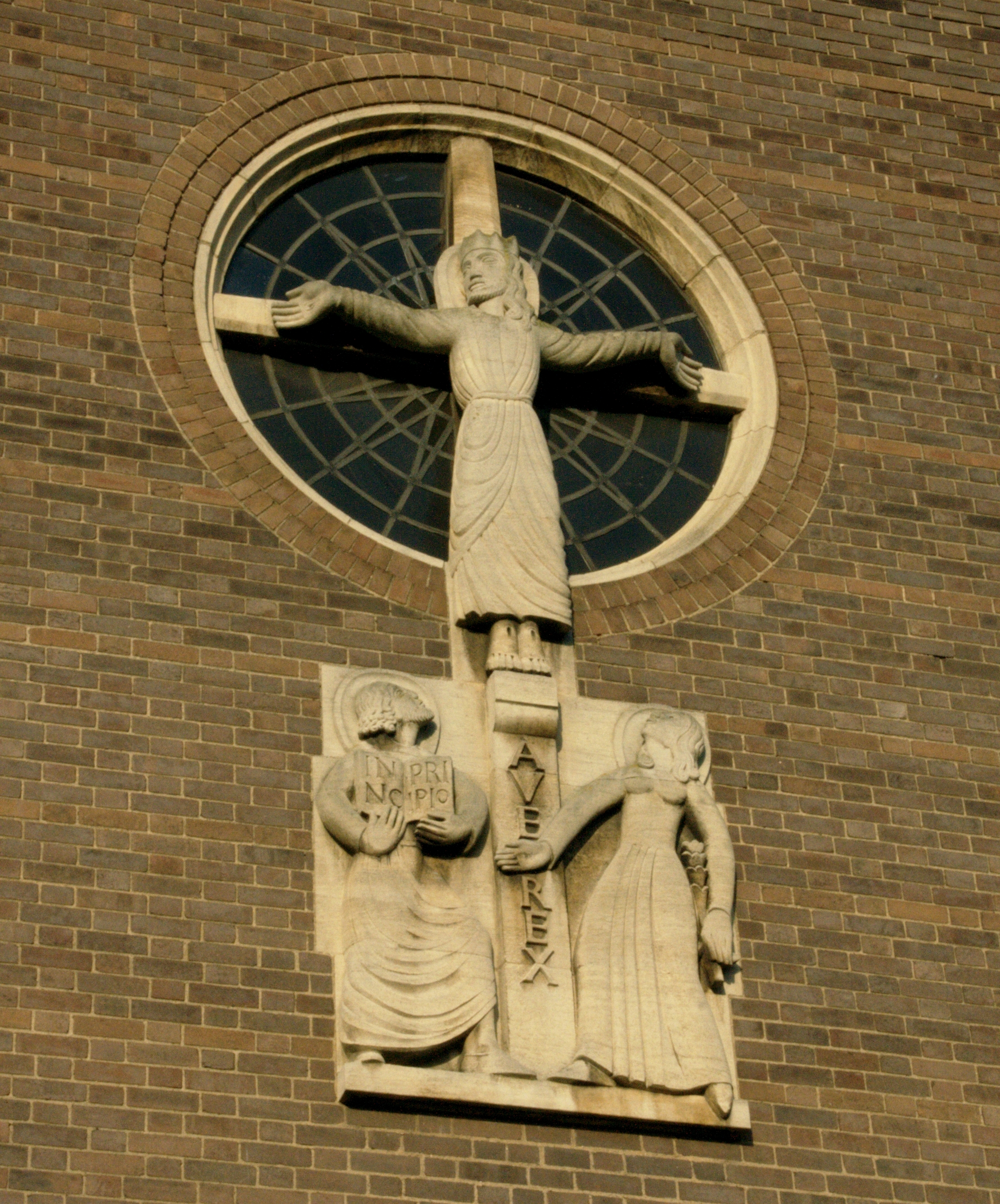
The Calvary which forms the east window by the British sculptor Eric Gill.

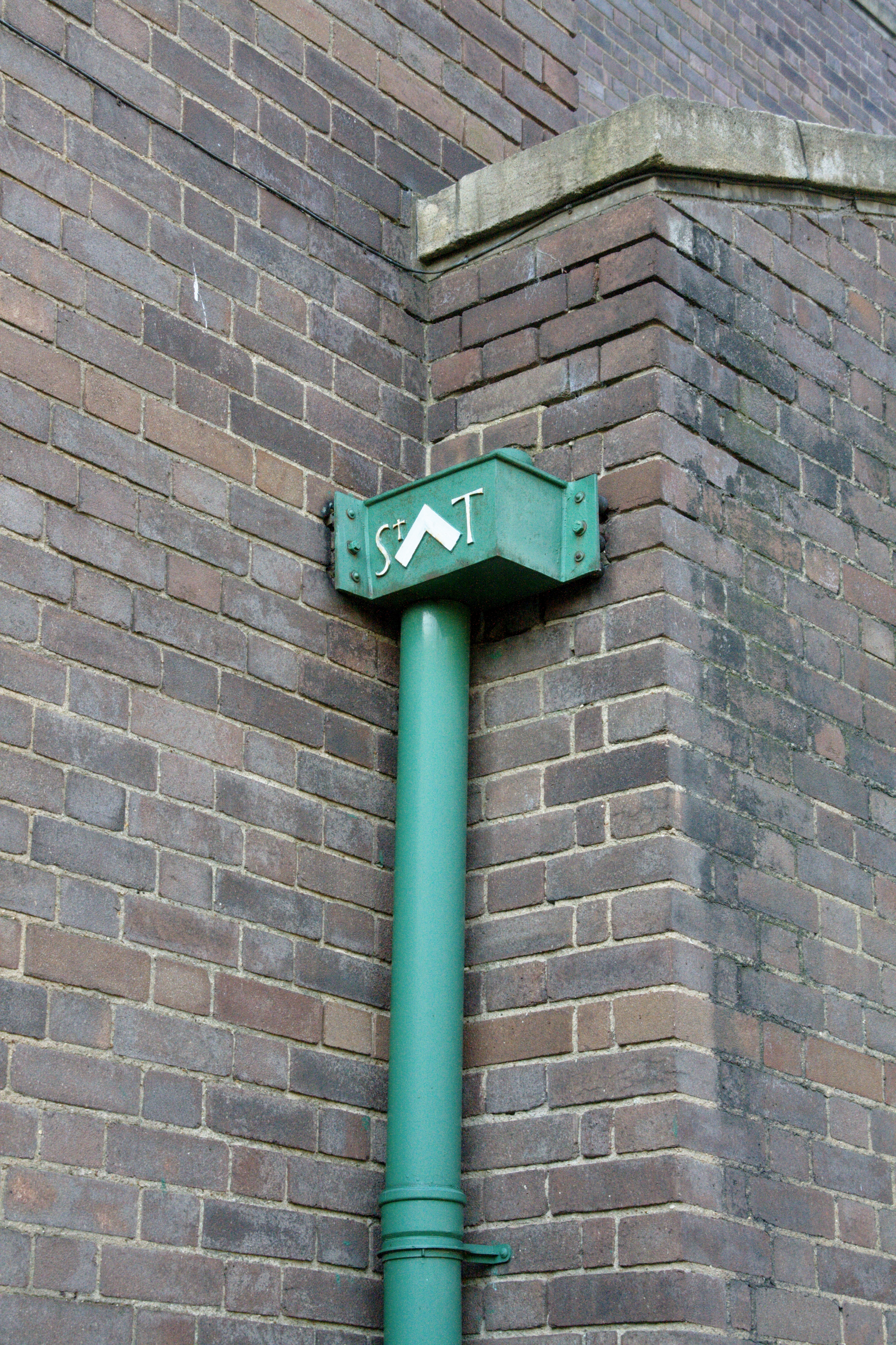
Drain pipe header. Between the letters St. and T is a square to symbolise the apostle as a 'builder.'

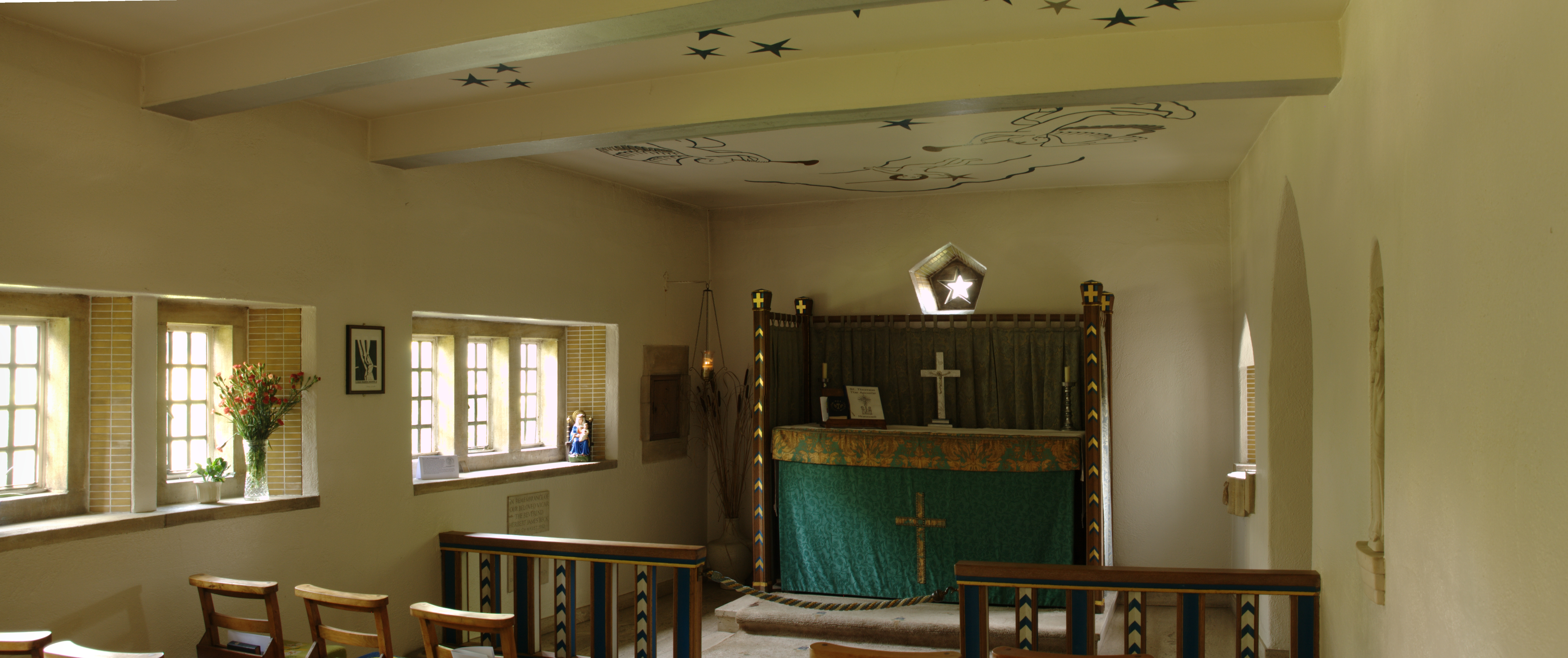
The Morning Chapel (now often called the Lady Chapel) ceiling was painted by Kathleen Roberts. The Madonna and child is in Caen stone carved by Vernon Hill and the sanctuary carpet and altar posts were designed by Edward Maufe.

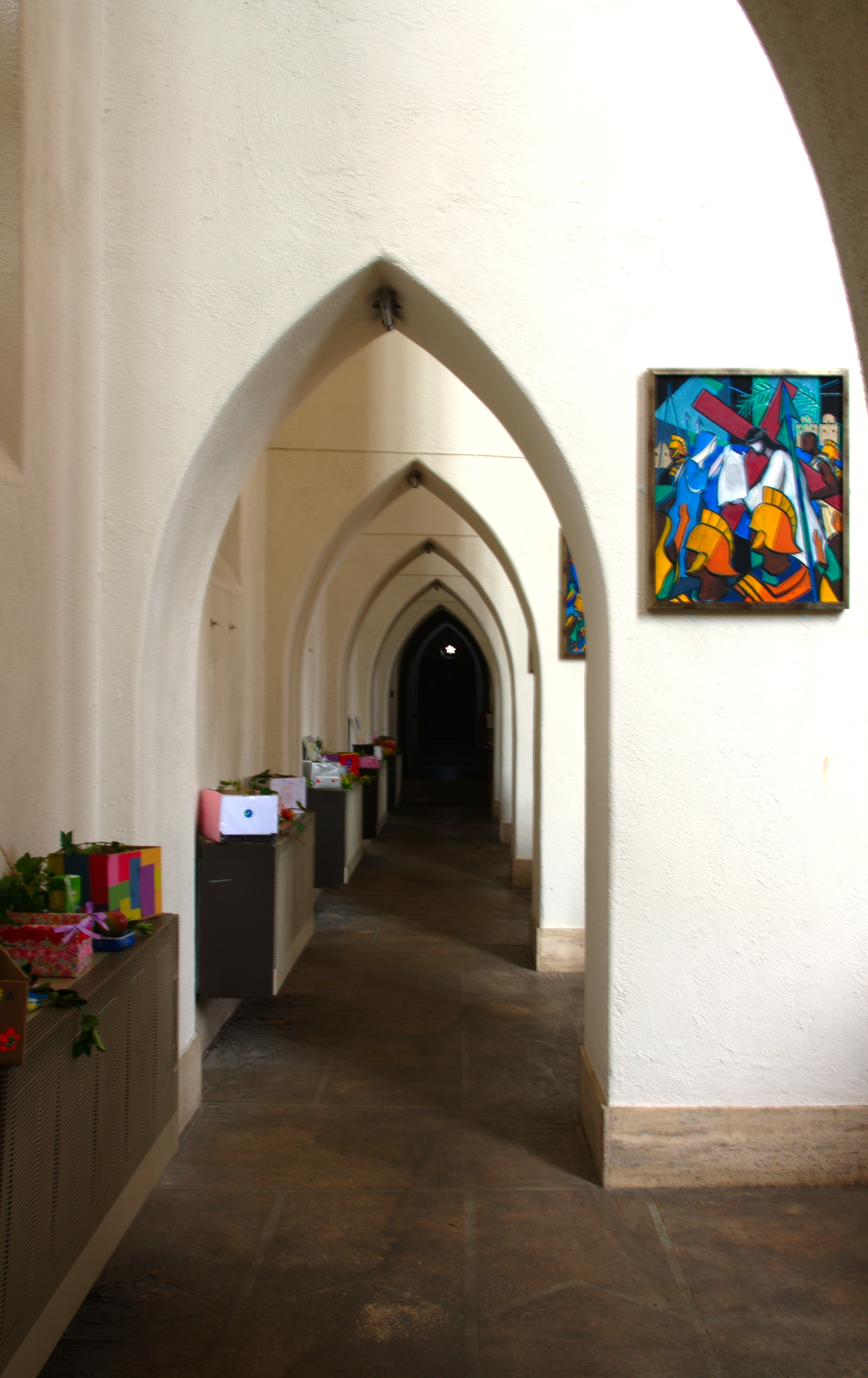
Northern aisle looking east towards the Lady Chapel.

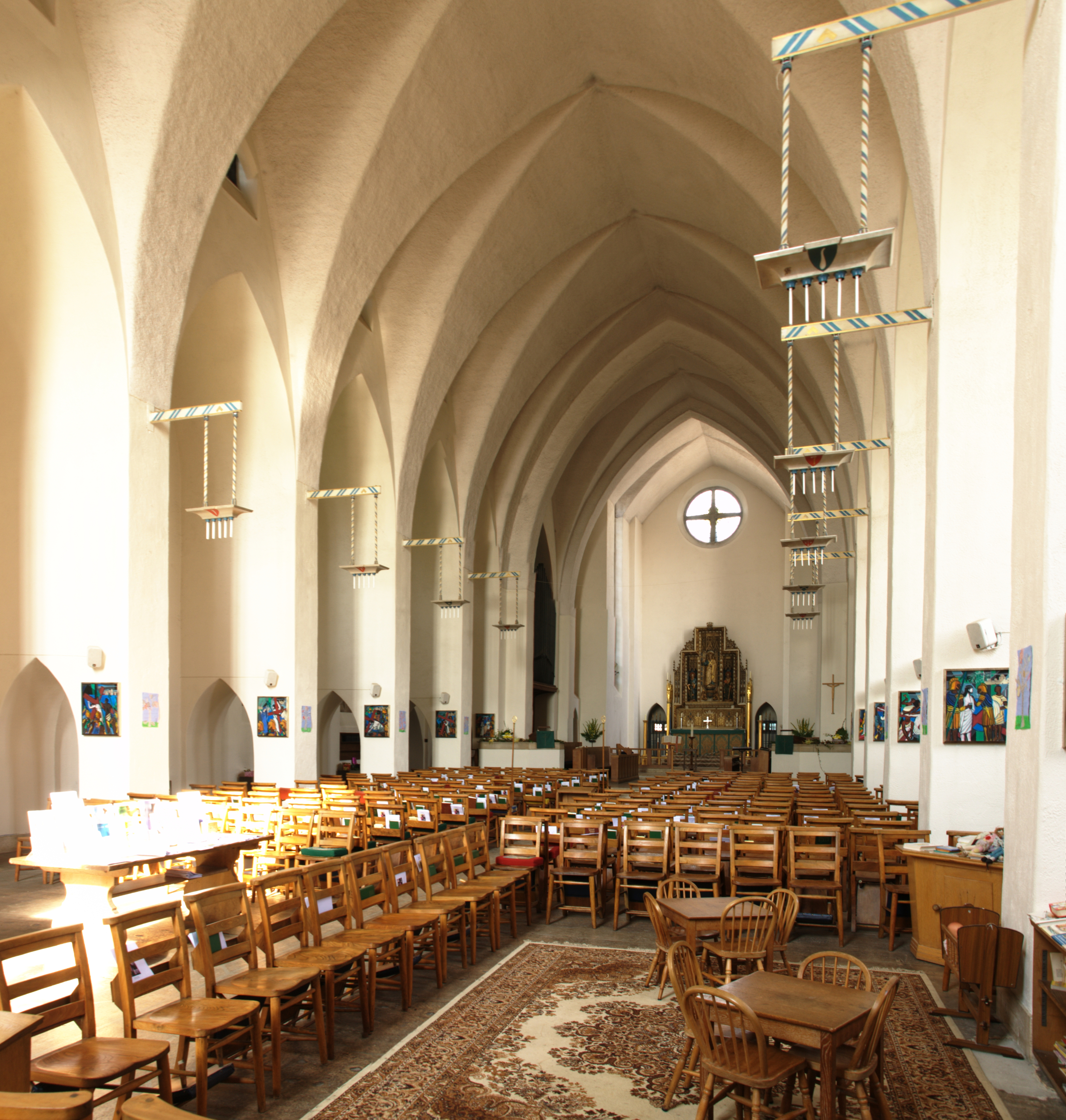
Looking eastwards from the creche. Note how the obverse of the Gill Calvary forms the tracery of the east window.

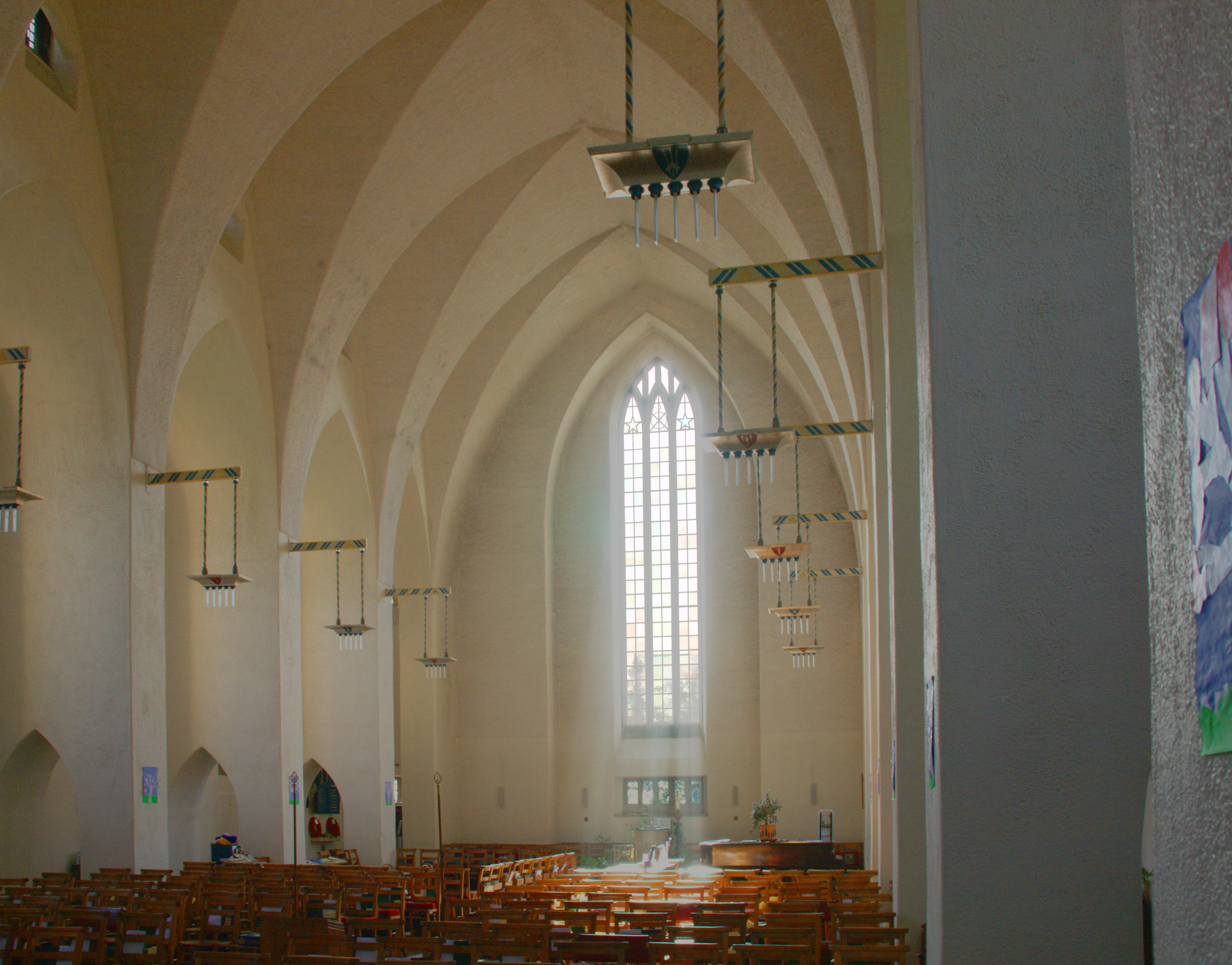
The western end
