= Stephen Graham (author) =

British travel writer (1884–1975)

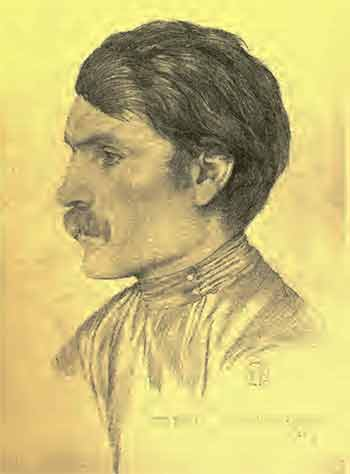
Stephen Graham

Stephen Graham (19 March 1884 – 15 March 1975) was a British journalist, travel-writer, essayist and novelist. His best-known books recount his travels around pre-revolutionary Russia and his journey to Jerusalem with a group of Russian Christian pilgrims. Most of his works express his sympathy for the poor, for agricultural labourers and for tramps, and his distaste for industrialisation.

== Biography ==
Graham was born in Edinburgh, the son of P. Anderson Graham, the essayist and editor of the periodical Country Life. Shortly after his birth his family moved to Cheltenham. At the age of fourteen Graham left school and worked in London as a clerk in the law courts and the civil service. He began to study Russian under Nicolai Lebedev, with whom he spent a holiday at Lysychansk near the Sea of Azov - an experience which began a lifelong interest in Russia. Shortly after returning to Britain he gave up his job and returned to Russia to hike around the Caucasus and the Urals. Thereafter he supported himself by his journalism and his books. He also taught English in Moscow.

In the early 20th century Lord Northcliffe commissioned Graham to write reports from Russia for his newspaper, The Times. Not long after his arrival in Russia he met Rosa Savory, whom he married in Russia in 1909. He was twenty-five; she, forty years old. During the First World War Graham found himself in the Altai Mountains, from which he sent accounts of the war as seen from a Russian point of view, which were published in The Times and republished as Russia and the World (1915) and Through Russian Central Asia (1916).

Graham returned to Britain and enlisted in the Scots Guards, as a private soldier rather than as an officer, because "to serve in the ranks is a unique opportunity to get to know the working man". He reached the Western Front in April 1918; and the following year published an account of his wartime experiences in A Private in the Guards (1919), in which he considers the human cost at which an elite military unit is created (one whose unofficial ethos was that "a good soldier was one who would not take a prisoner".) The book's first sentence is: "The sterner the discipline the better the soldier, the better the army". The book explores the paradox that the ideals for which Britain was fighting could be achieved only by means that were frequently brutal.

In 1921 Graham revisited the western battle-fields and published his observations in The Challenge of the Dead (1921). Graham later spent some time in the United States of America. He published accounts of immigrants in the States; and after becoming a friend of the poet Vachel Lindsay published Tramping with a Poet (1922), which was illustrated by Vernon Hill. In 1926 (later reprints occurred) he wrote, The Gentle Art of Tramping. This book gives some insight into his values, as well as a guide to living a simple, traveller's life during that period in his life. In 1964 he published his autobiography, Part of the Wonderful Scene.

== Bibliography ==
- A Vagabond in the Caucasus (1911)
- Undiscovered Russia (1912)
- A Tramp's Sketches (1912)
- Changing Russia (1913)
- With the Russian Pilgrims To Jerusalem (1913)
- With Poor Immigrants to America (1914)
- The Way of Martha and the Way of Mary (1915)
- Russia and the World (1915)
- Through Russian Central Asia (1916)
- Russia in 1916 (1917)
- Priest of the Ideal (1917)
- The Quest of the Face (1918)
- A Private in the Guards (1919)
- Children of the Slaves (1920)
- The Challenge of the Dead (1921)
- Europe - Whither Bound? Being Letters of Travel from the Capitals of Europe in the Year 1921
- Tramping with a Poet in the Rockies (1922)
- Russia in Division (1925) (Which detailed his unhappiness over the communist takeover of Russia)
- London Nights (1925)
- The Gentle Art of Tramping (1926)
- New York Nights (1927)
- Peter the Great: A Life of Peter I of Russia Called the Great (1929)
- St. Vitus Day (1930)
- Ivan the Terrible of Russia (1932)
- A Life of Alexander II, Tsar of Russia (1935)
- Summing Up on Russia (1951)
- Part of the wonderful scene: an autobiography (1964)
- In Quest of El Dorado (1923)
- Life and last Words of Wilfred Ewart (1924)
- Under-London (1923)
- Midsummer Music (1927)
- The Lay Confessor (1929)
- Everybody Pays (1932)
- Boris Godunof (1933)
- One Of The Ten Thousand (1933)

Most of the titles taken from Peter the Great, published by Ernest Benn London in 1929.

He also wrote of his travels in the United States.
