= Sabine Baring-Gould =

English priest and scholar (1834–1924)

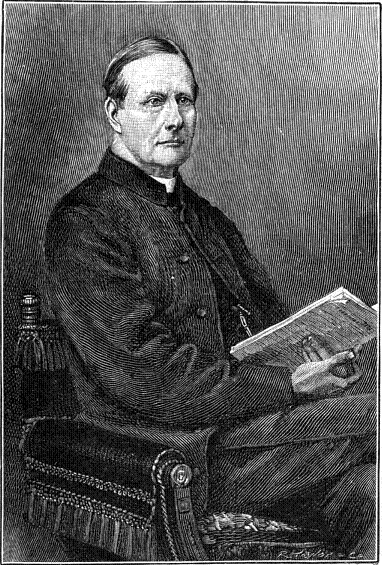
- Sabine Baring-Gould, engraving published in Strand Magazine, from a photograph by Downey (died 1881)
- Born: 28 January 1834; St Sidwells, Exeter, England
- Died: 2 January 1924 (aged 89); Lew Trenchard, Devon, England
- Education: Clare College, Cambridge
- Occupations: Anglican priest, hagiographer, antiquarian, novelist, folk song collector and eclectic scholar

Sabine Baring-Gould (/ˈseɪbɪn ˈbɛərɪŋ ˈɡuːld/; 28 January 1834 – 2 January 1924) of Lew Trenchard in Devon, England, was an Anglican priest, hagiographer, antiquarian, novelist, folk song collector and eclectic scholar.

He is remembered particularly as a writer of hymns, the best-known being "Onward, Christian Soldiers", and "Now the Day Is Over". He also translated the carols "Gabriel's Message", and "Sing Lullaby" from Basque to English.

His family home, the Jacobean manor house of Lew Trenchard, near Okehampton, Devon, has been preserved with the alterations he made and is a hotel.

== Origins ==
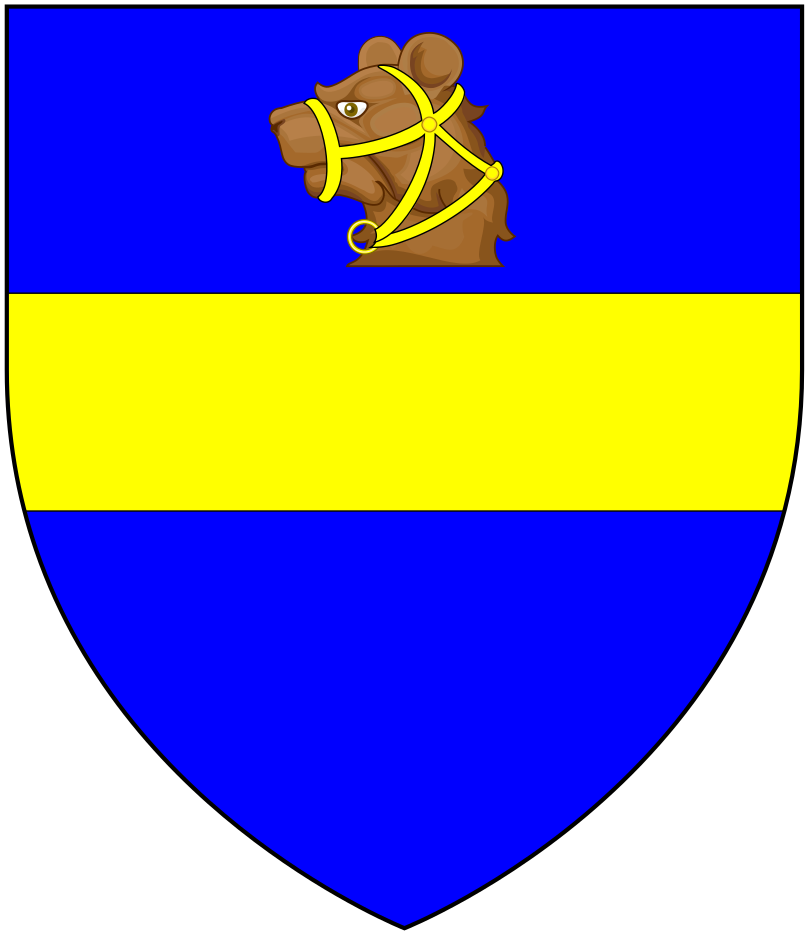
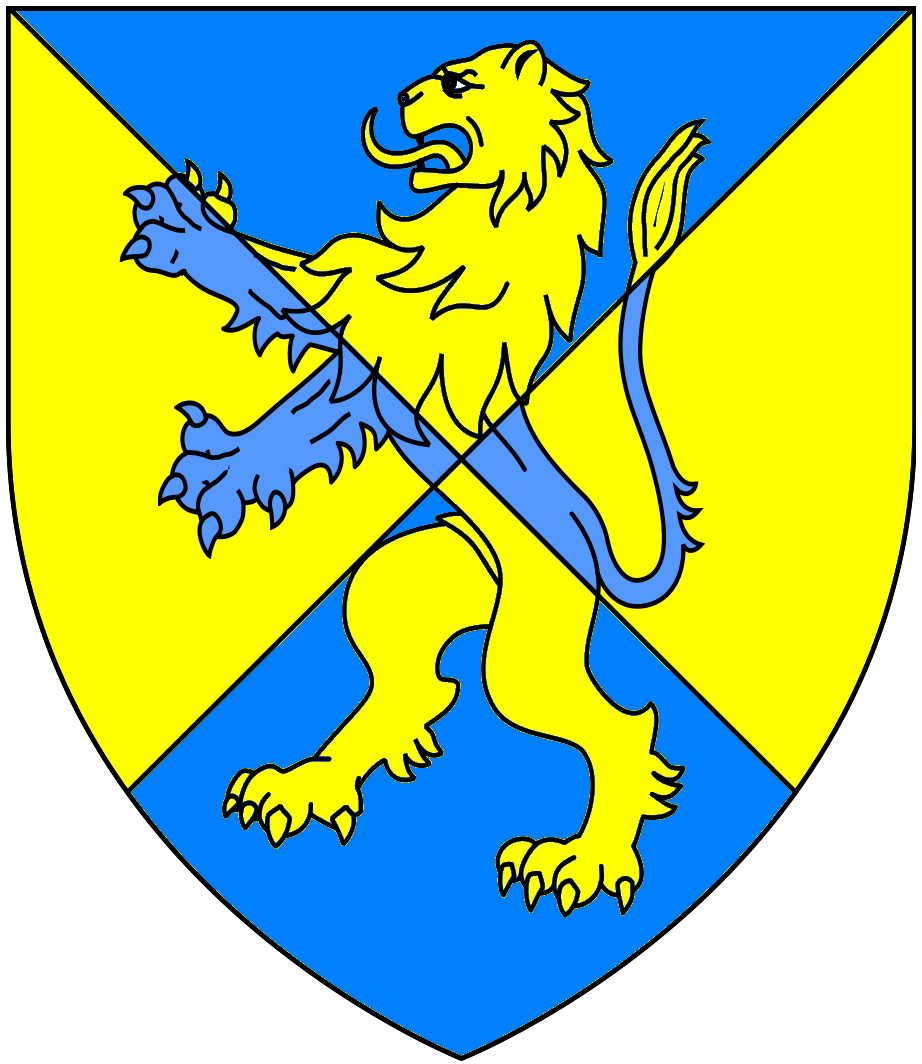
Left: Canting arms of Baring: Azure, a fesse or in chief a bear's head proper muzzled and ringed of the second; right: Arms of Gould: Per saltire azure and or a lion rampant counterchanged;

Sabine Baring-Gould was born in the parish of St Sidwell, Exeter, on 28 January 1834. He was the eldest son and heir of Edward Baring-Gould (1804–1872), lord of the manor of Lew Trenchard, a Justice of the Peace and Deputy Lieutenant of Devon, formerly a lieutenant in the Madras Light Cavalry (resigned 1830), by his first wife, Sophia Charlotte Bond, daughter of Admiral Francis Godolphin Bond, Royal Navy.

Sabine's paternal grandfather was William Baring (died 1846), JP, DL, who in 1795 had assumed by royal licence the additional surname and arms of Gould, in accordance with the terms of his inheritance of the manor of Lew Trenchard from his mother Margaret Gould, daughter and eventual heiress in her issue of William Drake Gould (1719–1767) of Lew Trenchard.

The Gould family was descended from a certain John Gold, a crusader present at the siege of Damietta in 1217 who for his valour, was granted in 1220 by Ralph de Vallibus, an estate at Seaborough in Somerset. Margaret Gould was the wife of Charles Baring (1742–1829) of Courtland in the parish of Exmouth, Devon, whose monument survives in Lympstone Church. He was the 4th son of Johann Baring (1697–1748), of Larkbeare House, Exeter, a German immigrant apprenticed to an Exeter wool merchant, and younger brother of Francis Baring (1740–1810), and John Baring (1730–1816) of Mount Radford, Exeter. The two brothers established the London merchant house of John and Francis Baring Company, which eventually became Barings Bank.

Sabine was named after the family of his grandmother, Diana Amelia Sabine (died 1858), wife of William Baring-Gould (died 1846), daughter of Joseph Sabine of Tewin, Hertfordshire and sister of the Arctic explorer General Sir Edward Sabine.

== Career ==
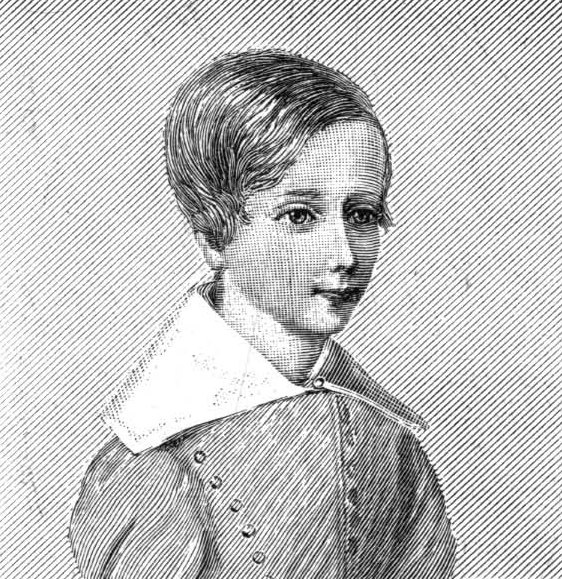
Baring-Gould at age five

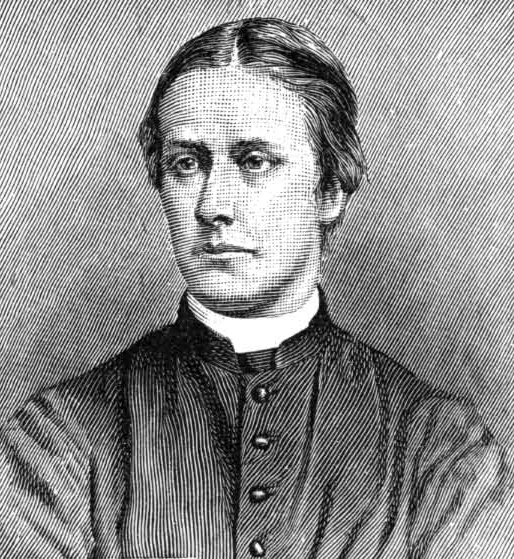
Baring-Gould at age 35

Because the family spent much of his childhood travelling round Europe, most of his education was by private tutors. He only spent about two years in formal schooling, first at King's College School in London (then located in Somerset House) and then, for a few months, at King's School, Warwick (now Warwick School). Here his time was ended by a bronchial disease of the kind that was to plague him throughout his long life. His father considered his ill-health as a good reason for another European tour.

In 1852, he was admitted to Cambridge University, earning the degrees of Bachelor of Arts in 1857, then Master of Arts (an upgrade, not a new qualification) in 1860 from Clare College, Cambridge. In September 1853 he informed Nathaniel Woodard of his desire to be ordained. He taught for only ten days at one of Woodard's boys' boarding schools in Sussex, Lancing College, but then moved to another, Hurstpierpoint College, where he stayed from 1857 to 1864. While there, he was responsible for several subjects, especially languages and science, and he also designed the ironwork of the bookcases in the boys' library, as well as painting the window jambs with scenes from the Canterbury Tales and The Faerie Queene.

He took holy orders in 1864, and at age 30, became the curate at Horbury Bridge, West Riding of Yorkshire. It was while acting as a curate that he met Grace Taylor, the daughter of a mill hand, then aged fourteen. In the next few years they fell in love. His vicar, John Sharp, arranged for Grace to live for two years with relatives in York to learn middle-class manners. Gould later became a friend of George Bernard Shaw, and this story is thought to be part inspiration for Shaw's play Pygmalion. Baring-Gould, meanwhile, relocated to become perpetual curate at Dalton, near Thirsk. He and Grace were married in 1868 at Wakefield. Their marriage lasted until her death 48 years later, and the couple had 15 children, all but one of whom lived to adulthood. When he buried his wife in 1916, he had carved on her tombstone the Latin motto Dimidium Animae Meae ('Half My Soul').

Baring-Gould became the rector of East Mersea in Essex in 1871 and spent ten years there. In 1872, his father died and he inherited the 3,000-acre (1,200 ha) family estates of Lewtrenchard in Devon, which included the gift of the living of Lew Trenchard parish. When the living became vacant in 1881, he was able to appoint himself to it, becoming parson as well as squire. He did a great deal of work restoring St Peter's Church, Lewtrenchard, and (from 1883 to 1914) thoroughly remodelled his home, Lew Trenchard Manor.

== Folk songs ==
Baring-Gould regarded his principal achievement to be the collection of folk songs that he made with the help of the ordinary people of Cornwall and Devon. His first book of songs, Songs and Ballads of the West (1889–91), was published in four parts between 1889 and 1891; the musical editor for this collection was Henry Fleetwood Sheppard, though some of the songs included were noted by Baring-Gould's other collaborator Frederick Bussell.

Baring-Gould and Sheppard produced a second collection named A Garland of Country Songs during 1895. A new edition of Songs of the West was proposed for publication in 1905. Sheppard had died in 1901, and so the folk song collector Cecil Sharp was invited to undertake the musical editorship for the new edition. Sharp and Baring-Gould also collaborated on English Folk Songs for Schools. This collection of 53 songs published in 1907 and used widely was used widely in British schools for the next 60 years.

Although he had to modify the words of some songs which were too rude for the time, he left his original manuscripts for future students of folk song, thereby preserving many beautiful pieces of music and their lyrics which might otherwise have been lost.

Baring-Gould gave the fair copies of the folk songs he collected, together with the notebooks he used for gathering information in the field, to Plymouth Public Library in 1914. They were deposited with the Plymouth and West Devon Record Office in 2006. These, together with the folk-song manuscripts from Baring-Gould's library discovered at Killerton in 1998, were published as a microfiche edition in 1998. In 2011 the complete collection of his folk-song manuscripts, including two notebooks not in the microfiche edition, were digitised and published online by the Devon Tradition Project managed by Wren Music in association with the English Folk Dance and Song Society as part of the "Take Six" project undertaken by the Vaughan Williams Memorial Library. It now forms part of the VWML's "Full English" website. Thirty boxes of additional manuscript material on other topics (the Killerton manuscripts) are kept in the Devon History Centre in Exeter.

Cecil Sharp dedicated his book English Folk Song: Some Conclusions (1907) to Baring-Gould.

== Literature ==
Baring-Gould wrote many novels, including The Broom-Squire set in the Devil's Punch Bowl (1896), Mehalah: a story of the salt marshes (1880), Guavas the Tinner (1897), the 16-volume The Lives of the Saints, and the biography of the eccentric poet-vicar of Morwenstow, Robert Stephen Hawker. He also published nearly 200 short stories in assorted magazines and periodicals. Many of these short stories were collected together and republished as anthologies, such as his Book of Ghosts (1904), Dartmoor Idyllys (1896), and In a Quiet Village (1900). His folkloric studies resulted in The Book of Were-Wolves (1865), one of the most frequently cited studies of lycanthropy. He habitually wrote while standing, and his standing desk can be seen in the manor.

One of his most enduringly popular works was Curious Myths of the Middle Ages, first published in two parts during 1866 and 1868, and republished in many other editions since then. "Each of the book's twenty-four chapters deals with a particular medieval superstition and its variants and antecedents", writes critic Steven J. Mariconda. H. P. Lovecraft termed it "that curious body of medieval lore which the late Mr. Baring-Gould so effectively assembled in book form".

He wrote much about the West Country: his works of this topic include:

- A Book of the West. 2 vols. I: Devon; II: Cornwall. London : Methuen, 1899
- Cornish Characters and Strange Events. London: John Lane, 1909 (reissued in 1925 in 2 vols., First series and Second series)
- Devonshire Characters and Strange Events.

Baring-Gould served as president of the Royal Institution of Cornwall for ten years from 1897.

== Dartmoor ==
Baring-Gould, along with his friend Robert Burnard, organised the first scientific archaeological excavations of hut-circles on Dartmoor at Grimspound during 1893. They then asked R. N. Worth, R. Hansford Worth, W. A. G. Gray and a Dr Prowse to assist them with further investigations. This resulted in the formation of the Committee of the Devonshire Association for the exploration of Dartmoor. Baring-Gould was the secretary and author of the first ten annual reports until 1905. The Dartmoor Exploration Committee performed many archaeological digs of prehistoric settlements on Dartmoor and systematically recorded and in some cases restored prehistoric sites. The current state of many prehistoric stone rows and stone circles on Dartmoor owes much to the work of Sabine Baring-Gould and Robert Burnard and the Dartmoor Exploration Committee. Baring-Gould was president of the Devonshire Association for the year 1896.

He wrote much about Dartmoor: his works of this topic include:

- Dartmoor idylls (1896)
- A Book of Dartmoor (1900), London : Methuen, 1900. Republished Halsgrove, 2002

== Family ==
He married Grace Taylor on 25 May 1868 at Horbury. They had 15 children: Mary (born 1869), Margaret Daisy (born 1870, an artist who painted part of the screen in Lew Trenchard Church), Edward Sabine (born 1871), Beatrice Gracieuse (1874–1876), Veronica (born 1875), Julian (born 1877), William Drake (born 1878), Barbara (born 1880), Diana Amelia (born 1881), Felicitas (baptised 1883), Henry (born 1885), Joan (born 1887), Cecily Sophia (born 1889), John Hillary (born 1890), and Grace (born 1891).

His wife Grace died in April 1916, and he did not remarry; he died on 2 January 1924 at his home at Lew Trenchard and was buried next to his wife.

He wrote two volumes of memoirs: Early Reminiscences, 1834–1864 (1923) and Further Reminiscences, 1864–1894 (1925).

One grandson, William Stuart Baring-Gould, was a noted Sherlock Holmes scholar who wrote a fictional biography of the great detective—in which, to make up for the lack of information about Holmes's early life, he based his account on the childhood of Sabine Baring-Gould. Sabine himself is a major character of Laurie R. King's Sherlock Holmes novel The Moor, a Sherlockian pastiche. In this novel it is revealed that Sabine Baring-Gould is the godfather of Sherlock Holmes.

Radio actor Robert Burnard was his grandson. Comedian Josh Widdicombe is a distant descendant.

== List of works ==
Works by Sabine Baring-Gould
Title	Year	Note
A Book of the Pyrenees	1907	Available on gutenberg.org
A Book of Dartmoor	1900	Available on gutenberg.org
A Book of Fairy Tales Retold by S. Baring-Gould	1894	
A Book of Folk-Lore	1913	
A Book of Cornwall	1899	Available on gutenberg.org
A Book of Ghosts	1904	Available on gutenberg.org
A Book of North Wales	1903	Available on gutenberg.org
A Book of South Wales	1905	
A Book of the Cevennes	1907	Available on gutenberg.org
A Book of the Rhine from Cleve to Mainz	1906	
A Book of the Riviera	1928	Available on gutenberg.org
A Book of the West: Being an Introduction to Devon and Cornwall	1899	Vol. 1, Vol. 2
A Coronation Souvenir	1902	
A Coronation Souvenir	1911	
A First Series of Village Preaching for a Year	1877	
A History of Sarawak under Its Two White Rajahs	1909	Available on gutenberg.org
A Memorial of Horatio Lord Nelson	1905	
A Second Series of Village Preaching for a Year	1884	
A Study of St. Paul, His Character and Opinions	1897	
Amazing Adventures	1903	Illustrated by Harry B. Neilson
An Account of an English Camp Near Bayonne	1851	
An Armory of the Western Counties, Devon and Cornwall	1898	
An Old English Home and its Dependencies	1898	Available on gutenberg.org
Arminell: A Social Romance	1890	Vol. 1, Vol. 2, Vol. 3
Bladys of the Stewponey	1898	
Brittany	1902	Available on gutenberg.org
Cheap Jack Zita	1894	Available on gutenberg.org
Chris of All Sorts	1903	
Church Songs, First Series	1884	
Cliff Castles and Cave Dwellings of Europe	1911	Available on gutenberg.org
Conscience and Sin: Daily Meditations for Lent	1890	Available on gutenberg.org
Cornish Characters and Strange Events	1909	Available on gutenberg.org
Cornwall	1910	Available on gutenberg.org
Court Royal	1891	
Court Royal: A Story of Cross Currents	1886	
Curiosities of Olden Times	1896	Available on gutenberg.org
Curious Myths of the Middle Ages	1866	Available on gutenberg.org
Curious Myths of the Middle Ages, Second Series	1868	
Dartmoor Idylls	1896	
Devon	1907	
Devon Characters and Strange Events	1908	Available on gutenberg.org
Domitia (novel)	1898	Available on gutenberg.org
Early Reminiscences, 1834–1864	1923	
English Minstrelsie: A National Monument of English Song	1896	
Eve: A Novel	1888	Available on gutenberg.org
Evening Communions: A Letter to the Lord Bishop of Exeter	1895	
Family Names and Their Story	1910	
Further Reminiscences, 1864–1894	1925	
Furze Bloom: Tales of the Western Moors	1899	
Germany	1883	
Germany, Present and Past	1882	
Golden Feather	1886	
Grettir the Outlaw: A Story of Iceland	1890	Available on gutenberg.org
Guavas the Tinner	1897	
Historic Oddities and Strange Events, First Series	1891	Available on gutenberg.org
How to Save Fuel	1874	
Iceland, Its Scenes and Its Sagas	1863	
In a Quiet Village	1900	Available on gutenberg.org
In Dewisland	1904	
In Exitu Israel: An Historical Novel of the French Revolution	1870	Vol. 1, Vol. 2
In the Roar of the Sea: A Tale of the Cornish Coast	1892	Volume I, volume II, and volume III; also available on gutenberg.org
In Troubadour Land: A Ramble in Provence and Languedoc	1891	Available on gutenberg.org
Jacquetta and Other Stories	1890	
John Herring: A West of England Romance	1889	Vol.1, Vol.2 Vol.3
Kitty Alone: A Story of Three Fires	1894	Vol. 1, Available on gutenberg.org, Vol. 3
Legends of Old Testament Characters, from the Talmud and Other Sources	1872	Available on gutenberg.org
Legends of the Patriarchs and Prophets	1881	Available on gutenberg.org
Little Tu'penny	1887	
Lives of the Saints	1897	
Margery of Quether, and Other Stories	1892	
Mehalah, A Story of the Salt Marshes	1880	Available on gutenberg.org
Miss Quillet	1902	
Monsieur Pichelmere, and Other Stories	1905	
Mrs. Curgenven of Curgenven	1893	
My Few Last Words	1924	
My Prague Pig and Other Stories for Children	1890	
Nazareth and Capernaum: Ten Lectures on the Beginning of Our Lord's Ministry	1886	
Nebo the Nailer	1902	
Noémi: A Story of Rock-Dwellers	1895	Available on gutenberg.org
Old Country Life	1889	Available on gutenberg.org
One Hundred Sermon Sketches for Extempore Preachers	1871	
Organization: A Sermon Preached at St. Michael's Church, Wakefield	1870	
Our Inheritance: An Account of the Eucharistic Service in the First Three Centuries	1888	
Our Parish Church: Twenty Addresses to Children on Great Truths of the Christian Faith	1885	
Pabo, The Priest	1899	Available on gutenberg.org
Perpetua: A Story of Nimes in A.D. 213	1897	Available on gutenberg.org
Post-Mediaeval Preachers: Some Account of the Most Celebrated Preachers of the Fifteenth, Sixteenth, and Seventeenth Centuries	1865	Available on gutenberg.org
Protestant or Catholic? A Lecture	1872	
Red Spider	1888	Vol.1, Vol.2
Richard Cable the Lightshipman	1888	
Romances of the West Country	1898	
Royal Georgie	1901	
Secular v. Religious Education: A Sermon	1872	
Sermons on the Seven Last words	1884	
Sermons to Children	1879	
Sheepstor	1912	
Siegfried: A Romance Founded on Wagner's Operas, Rheingold, Siegfried, and Gotterdammerung	1905	
Some Modern Difficulties: Nine Lectures	1875	
Some Remarks upon 'Two Recent Memoirs of R. S. Hawker, Late Vicar of Morwenstow'	1876	
Songs of the West: Folksongs of Devon & Cornwall	1905	Available on gutenberg.org. With Frederick William Bussell and Henry Fleetwood Sheppard
Strange Survivals: Some Chapters in the History of Man	1892	Available on gutenberg.org
The Birth of Jesus: Eight Discourses for Advent, Christmas and Epiphany	1885	
The Book of Were-Wolves, Being an Account of a Terrible Superstition	1865	Also available on gutenberg.org
The Broom-Squire	1896	Available on gutenberg.org
The Chorister, a Tale of King's College Chapel in the Civil Wars	1856	
The Church in Germany	1891	
The Church Revival: Thoughts Thereon and Reminiscences	1914	
The Crock of Gold	1899	
The Death and Resurrection of Jesus: Ten Lectures for Holy Week and Easter	1888	
The Deserts of Southern France: An Introduction to the Limestone and Chalk Plateaux of Ancient Aquitaine	1894	
The Evangelical Review	1920	
The Frobishers: A Story of the Staffordshire Potteries	1901	
The Golden Gate: A Complete Manual of Instructions, Devotions, and Preparations	1896	
The Gaverocks: A Tale of the Cornish Coast	1888	
The Icelander's Sword, or the Story of Oraefa-Dal	1893	
The Land of Teck and Its Neighborhood	1911	
The Life of Napoleon Bonaparte	1908	
The Lives of the British Saints: The Saints of Wales and Cornwall and Such Irish Saints as Have Dedications in Britain	1913	
The Lives of the Saints	1914	Vol. 1, Vol. 2 Vol. 3
The lost and hostile gospels an essay on the Toledoth Jeschu, and the Petrine and Pauline gospels of the first three centuries of which fragments remain	1874	Available on gutenberg.org
The Mystery of Suffering: Six Lectures	1877	
The Nativity	1885	
The Origin and Development of Religious Belief	1871	
The Passion of Jesus: Seven Discourses for Lent, First Series	1887	
The Path of the Just: Tales of Holy Men and Children	1857	
The Pennycomequicks	1889	Vol. 1, Vol. 2, Vol. 3
The Preacher's Pocket: A Packet of Sermons	1880	
The Present Crisis: A Letter to the Bishop of Exeter	1899	
The Queen of Love	1894	
The Restitution of All Things	1907	
The Seven Last Words: A Course of Sermons	1884	
The Silver Store: Collected from Mediaeval Christian and Jewish Mines	1887	
The Sunday Round: Plain Village Sermons for the Sundays of the Christian Year	1899	
The Tragedy of the Caesars: A Study of the Characters of the Caesars of the Julian and Claudian Houses	1892	
The Trials of Jesus: Seven Discourses for Lent	1886	
The Vicar of Morwenstow: A Life of Robert S. Hawker	1899	Available on gutenberg.org
The Village Pulpit: A Complete Course of Sixty-Six Short Sermons, or Full Sermon Outlines for Each Sunday, and Some Chief Holy Days of the Christian Year	1887	Available on gutenberg.org
The Way of Sorrows: Seven Discourses for Lent	1887	
Through All the Changing Scenes of Life	1892	
Through Flood and Flame	1868	
Troubadour-Land: A Ramble in Provence and Languedoc	1891	Available on gutenberg.org
Two Sermons for the Coronation of King George	1911	
Urith, A Tale of Dartmoor	1891	Available on gutenberg.org
Village Conferences on the Creed	1873	
Village Preaching for a Year	1884	
Village Preaching for Saints' Days	1881	
Virgin Saints and Martyrs	1901	Available on gutenberg.org
Wagner's Parsifal at Baireuth	1892	
Winefred: A Story of the Chalk Cliffs	1900	Available on gutenberg.org
Yorkshire Oddities, Incidents and Strange Events	1874	Available on gutenberg.org
