= Richard Nicholls Worth =

English geologist and historian

Richard Nicholls Worth (19 July 1837− 3 July 1896) an English geologist and historian of the City of Plymouth in Devon.

== Life ==
Worth was apprenticed in 1851 at the Devonport and Plymouth Telegraph, becoming a member of the staff in 1858. In 1863 he joined the Western Morning News, remaining with it till 1865. In 1866 and the following year he lived at Newcastle upon Tyne as editor of the Northern Daily Express, but, finding the climate too trying, rejoined the staff of the Western Morning News in 1867. In 1877 he became associated with Messrs. Brendon & Son, printers and publishers, of Plymouth, receiving a testimonial of plate by public subscription in Devon and Cornwall for his services as a journalist. In this business he remained till his death, though he continued to contribute occasionally, not only to the local press but also to Nature, the Academy, and other periodicals.

Worth devoted his spare time to investigating the history and geology of the west of England. Patient and exact, dreading hasty theorising, he did much for the history, archaeology, and geology of Devon and Cornwall.

He was twice president of the Plymouth Association, and in 1891 of the Devonshire Association. A portrait in oils, painted by Lane in 1873, is in possession of the family.

== Family ==
Worth was the eldest son of Richard Worth, a builder of Devonport, by his wife Eliza, daughter of Richard Nicholls of the same place. He married, 22 March 1860, at Stoke Damerel, Devonshire, Lydia Amelia, daughter of Richard Davies of the Dockyard, Devonport. He died suddenly at Shaugh Prior, where he was temporarily resident, on 3 July 1896, and was buried in the village churchyard. One son and one daughter survived him. His son Richard Hansford Worth followed in his father's footsteps becoming a renowned author on Dartmoor.

== Works ==
Altogether Worth published about 140 papers between 1869 and his death, mostly historical, and in the proceedings of local societies; some of the scientific papers appeared in the Quarterly Journal of the Geological Society of London, of which he became a fellow in 1875. Besides a series of guide-books and several smaller works, he was the author of:

- History of the Town and Borough of Devonport, Plymouth, 1870.
- History of Plymouth, From the Earliest Period to the Present Time, Plymouth, 1871; 2nd edit. 1873; 3rd edit. 1890.
- The Three Towns Bibliotheca [for Plymouth, Devonport, and Stonehouse], 1871.
- The West Country Garland, selected from the Writings of the Poets of Devon and Cornwall, Plymouth, 1878.
- A History of Devonshire: With Sketches of Its Leading Worthies, Plymouth, 1895.
- The Common Seals of Devon and Cornwall.
- Historical Notes Concerning the Progress of Mining Skills in Cornwall and Devon.
