= Victor Cherbuliez =

Swiss/French author (1829–1899)

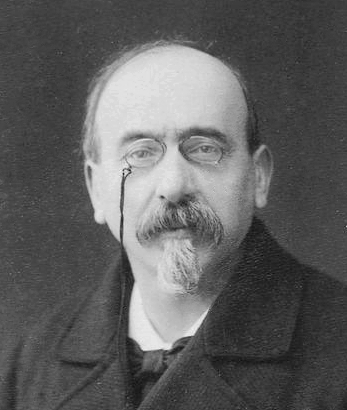
Victor Cherbuliez

Charles Victor Cherbuliez (German: [ʃɛʁbylje]; 19 July 1829 – 1 or 2 July 1899) was a Swiss, and then (1879) French novelist and author. He was born at Geneva, Switzerland and died at Combs-la-Ville. He was the eleventh member elected to occupy seat 3 of the Académie Française in 1881.

== Biography ==
Cherbuliez was born in Geneva, where his father, André Cherbuliez (1795–1874), was a classical professor at the University of Geneva. He was descended from a family of Huguenot refugees, and many years later Victor Cherbuliez resumed his French nationality, taking advantage of a right of return law passed in the early days of the French Revolution. Geneva was the scene of his early education; thence he proceeded to Paris, and afterwards to the universities of Bonn and Berlin.

Cherbuliez returned to his native town and engaged in the profession of teaching. After his resumption of French citizenship he was elected a member of the Académie Française (1881), and having received the Legion of Honour in 1870, he was promoted to be officer of the order in 1892.

== Work ==
Cherbuliez was a voluminous and successful writer of fiction. His first book, originally published in 1860, reappeared in 1864 under the title of Un Cheval de Phidias: it is a romantic study of art in the golden age of Athens. He went on to produce a series of novels.

Most of these novels first appeared in the Revue des deux mondes, such as Le Comte Kostia (1863). Cherbuliez also contributed a number of political and learned articles to the Revue des deux mondes, usually printed with the pseudonym G Valbert. Many of these have been published in collected form under the titles L'Allemagne politique (1870), L'Espagne politique (1874), Profils étrangers (1889), L'Art et la nature (1892), etc. The volume Etudes de littérature et d'art (1873) includes articles for the most part reprinted from Le Temps.

== Assessment ==
According to Robert Crewe-Milnes in the Encyclopædia Britannica Eleventh Edition:

The earlier novels of Cherbuliez have been said to show marked traces of the influence of George Sand; his method was that of an older school. He did not possess the sombre power or the intensely analytical skill of some of his later contemporaries, but his books are distinguished by a freshness and honesty, fortified by cosmopolitan knowledge and lightened by unobtrusive humour, which fully account for their wide popularity in many countries besides his own. His genius was the reverse of dramatic, and attempts to present two of his stories on the stage have not succeeded. His essays have all the merits due to liberal observation and thoroughness of treatment; their style, like that of the novels, is admirably lucid and correct.

== Bibliography ==
- Le Comte Kostia (1863)
- Le Prince Vitale (1864)
- Le roman d'une honnête femme (1866)
- L'aventure de Ladislas Bolski (1869)
- La Revanche de Joseph Noirel (1870)
- Miss Rovel (1875)
- Samuel Brohl et Cie (1877)
- L'idée de Jean Téterol (1878)
- Noirs et rouges (1881)
- La vocation du comte Ghislain (1888)
- Une gageure (1890)
- Le Secret du précepteur (1893)
- Jacquine Vanesse (1898)
