= Richard Pearse Chope =

British civil servant

Richard Pearse Chope (1862–1938) was a British civil servant in the Patent Office, antiquarian and printer in Devon. He joined the Devonshire Association in 1896 and was presented from 1926 to 1927. Chope edited the Transactions of the Devonshire Association between 1928 and 1930.

== Selected publications ==
- Ballads Weird and Wonderful (1912)
- "Benson, M. P. and Smuggler," in The Hartland Chronicle, 1906.
- Chope, Richard Pearse; Thornley, Isobel Dorothy (1940). The Book of Hartland. Torquay: The Devonshire Press.
