= Devonshire Association =

British learned society

- Established: 1862; 164 years ago
- Founder: William Pengelly
- Founded at: Exeter
- Type: Learned society
- Registration no.: 1209194
- Legal status: Charitable incorporated organisation
- Region served: Devon, England
- Members: ~1,300
- President: Nick Powe
- Chair: Dr Susan Andrew
- Website: devonassoc.org.uk

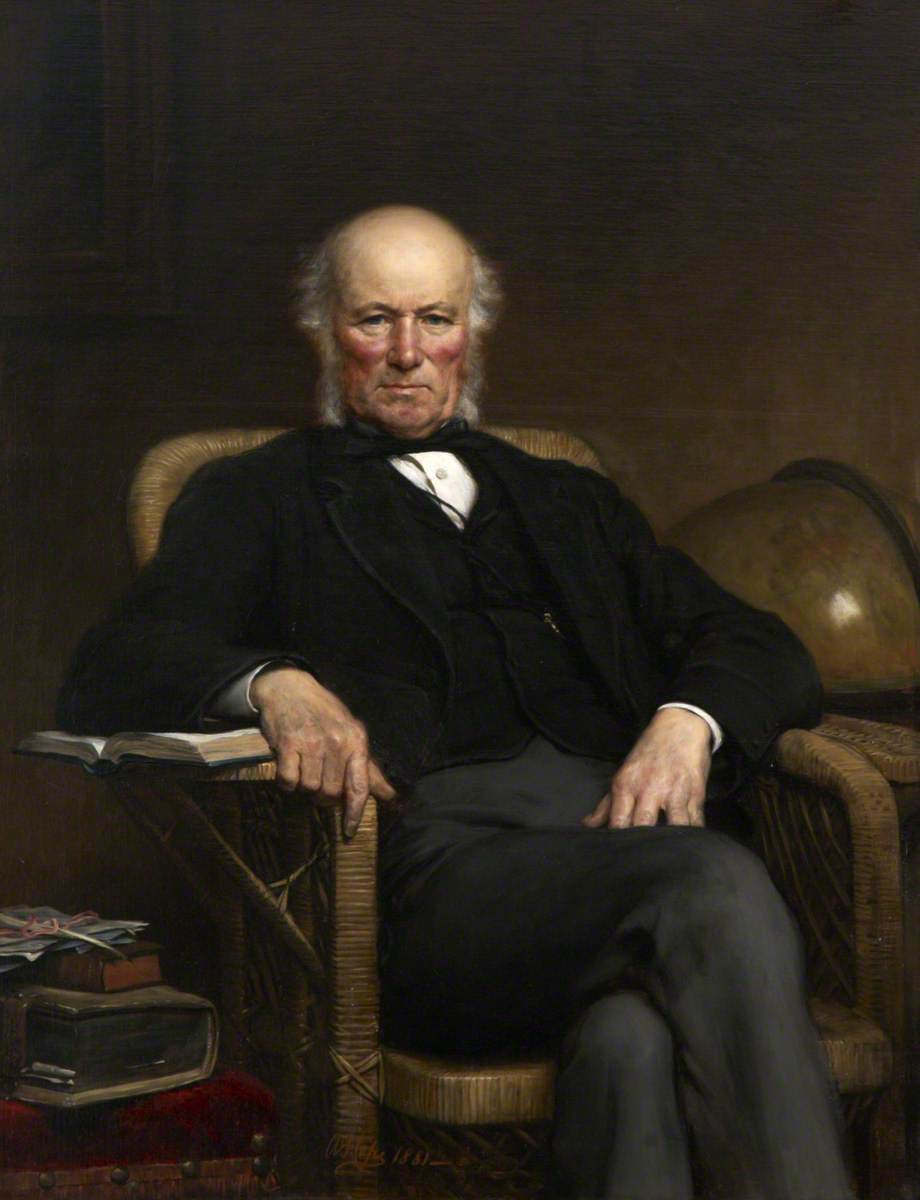
William Pengelly, founder

The Devonshire Association (DA) is a learned society founded in 1862 by William Pengelly and modelled on the British Association, but concentrating on research subjects linked to Devon in the fields of science, literature and the arts.

== History ==
The first meeting was held in Exeter, England in 1862 with a membership of 69 and, except for 1942, meetings have been held annually in different locations around the county every year since. James Hine, a Plymouth architect and the association's president in 1897, was the last remaining founding member of the association at the time of his death in 1914. The only time the association has met outside of Devon was when it held its annual meeting in Launceston as Hine was too ill to travel. Although similar in format to older groups such as the Plymouth Institution (inaugurated in 1812) and the Devon and Exeter Institution (1813), The Devonshire Association's aims were broader and more ambitious.

By 1877, there were around 500 members and this number remained fairly constant until just before the Second World War. In 1932 the first of a number of local branches was established in Plymouth, and subject-based sections were formed, specialising in botany, buildings, entomology, geology, history, literature, folklore and the dialect of Devon. By 1952 membership had risen to 1,100 and to over 1,800 by the centenary in 1963. In 2009 membership stood at 1,306.

== Today ==
The DA is a registered charity. Annually, it publishes its Report and Transactions which includes reports from the sections and branches, and peer reviewed research papers.

The association's three-day annual conference takes place in June, at a different Devon venue each year. At this event local visits are organised, along with a formal dinner and an AGM, at which an honorary president takes office, invited from those "of standing and importance" in the county. Since 2006 the association has also held an annual President's Symposium on a topic of his or her choosing; the one in 2007, for instance concerned farming in Devon.

A number of events take place throughout the year, including presentations, visits to notable places in the county, and training courses on various aspects of the association's work. The DA also makes grants to support Devon-related research projects.

The President for 2010–11 was Roger Thorne, JP, CEng, MICE, FSA who was succeeded by Professor Nicholas Orme, MA, DPhil, DLitt, FSA, FRHistS in 2011. The association's 150th anniversary in 2012 was marked by a major conference in Torquay, the home town of its founder, William Pengelly.

== Some notable presidents ==
The year shown is the one in which the Presidential address was given.

- 1863 John Bowring
- 1864 Charles Spence Bate
- 1865 Charles Daubeny
- 1866 John Russell, 1st Earl Russell
- 1867 William Pengelly
- 1868 John Coleridge, 1st Baron Coleridge
- 1869 George Parker Bidder
- 1870 James Anthony Froude
- 1871 Charles Kingsley
- 1872 Frederick Temple, Bishop of Exeter
- 1875 Richard John King
- 1877 Alfred Earle
- 1878 Samuel White Baker
- 1879 Robert Collier, 1st Baron Monkswell
- 1884 Thomas Roscoe Rede Stebbing
- 1887 William Dallinger
- 1889 Wilfred Hudleston Hudleston
- 1895 Hardinge Giffard, 1st Earl of Halsbury
- 1896 Sabine Baring-Gould
- 1897 James Hine
- 1901 Roper Lethbridge
- 1903 Edgar Vincent, 1st Viscount D'Abernon
- 1905 Basil Thomson
- 1906 Frederick Thomas Elworthy
- 1907 Archibald Robertson, Bishop of Exeter
- 1908 Robert Collier, 2nd Baron Monkswell
- 1909 Charles Stubbs, Bishop of Truro
- 1911 Robert Burnard
- 1914 Arthur Mason Worthington
- 1915 Arthur W Clayden
- 1917 William Philip Hiern
- 1919 Henry Gamble, Dean of Exeter
- 1922 Henry Duke, 1st Baron Merrivale
- 1926 Richard Pearse Chope
- 1927 William Cecil Dampier
- 1928 Emma, Lady Radford
- 1929 George Parker Bidder III
- 1930 R. Hansford Worth
- 1931 Howard Masterman, Bishop of Plymouth
- 1934 J. C. Squire
- 1936 Robert Newman, 1st Baron Mamhead
- 1947 Ralegh Radford
- 1948 Leo Amery
- 1952 Margaret Cruwys
- 1953 Frederick Stratten Russell
- 1956 Hugh Fortescue, 5th Earl Fortescue
- 1957 Rev. S. C. Carpenter
- 1959 Leonard Knight Elmhirst
- 1960 Tony Giffard, 3rd Earl of Halsbury
- 1962 Robert Mortimer, Bishop of Exeter
- 1964 Derick Heathcoat-Amory, 1st Viscount Amory
- 1967 Wilfrid Westall, Bishop of Crediton
- 1971 G. Wilson Knight
- 1973 Lord Foot
- 1974 Richard Acland
- 1975 Sir Charles Cave, 4th Baronet
- 1978 William George Hoskins
- 1981 Frank Barlow
- 1984 Basil Greenhill
- 1988 John Parker, 6th Earl of Morley
- 1989 Joyce Youings
- 1997 Sir Hugh Stucley, 6th Baronet
- 2000 Richard Hawkins, Bishop of Crediton
- 2001 John Seymour, 19th Duke of Somerset
- 2003 Eric Dancer
- 2007 Justin Leigh
- 2011 Nicholas Orme
- 2016 Todd Gray
- 2017 David Fursdon, Lord Lieutenant of Devon
- 2018 Dame Suzi Leather
