= Helen Rex Keller =

American librarian (1876–1967)

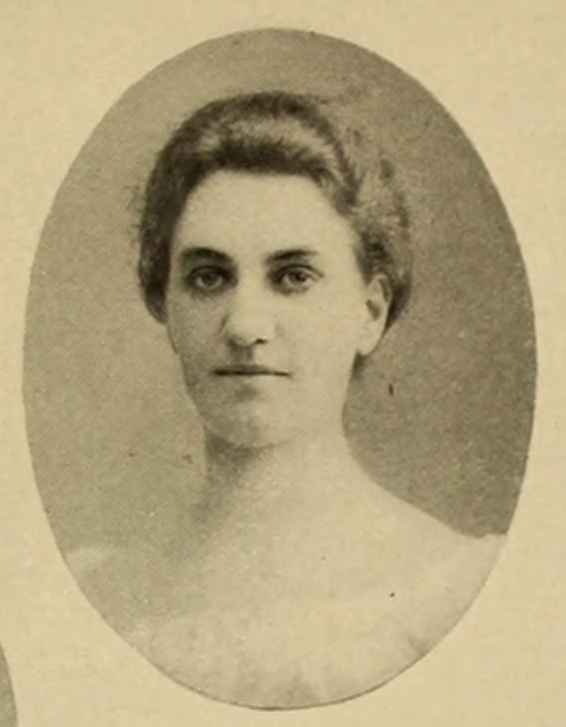
- Born: 1877
- Died: January 21, 1967 (aged 89–90); New Paltz (town)
- Alma mater: Smith College; Columbia University
- Occupation: Librarian, writer
- Employer: Boston Public Library; Colgate University; Columbia University; Drexel University; League of Nations; Utica Public Library

Helen Rex Keller (August 13, 1876 – January 21, 1967) was an American librarian and author of reference books. Her works included a two volume dictionary of dates.

Keller edited and wrote the preface for the Library of the World's Best Literature, a 30-volume reference work with synopses of works of literature. It was a continuation and expanded version of the Warner Library first published in 1897 with various editions up to 1917 edited by Charles Dudley Warner. She also authored a Dictionary of Dates divided into two volumes for the "old world" and "new world", and also authored the Readers's Digest of Books which provides summaries of about 1,500 books.

Keller taught classes in library economy at Columbia University and was the librarian for its journalism school.

She died in New Paltz, New York, in 1967.

== Bibliography ==
- The dictionary of dates (1934) by Helen Rex Keller, Macmillan Company, New York
- Library of the World's Best Literature, editor
