= Northampton War Memorial =

First World War memorial on Wood Hill in the centre of Northampton, England

- United Kingdom
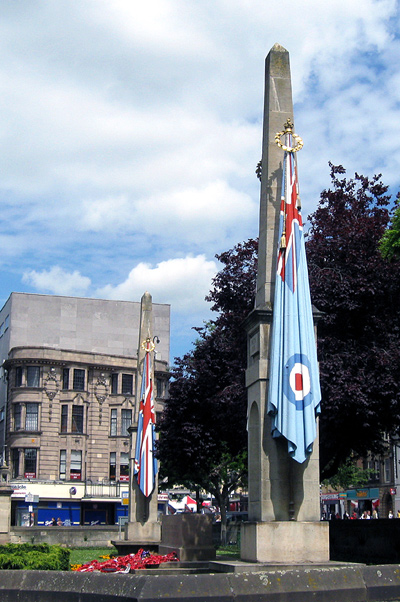
- For servicemen from Northamptonshire killed in the First and Second World Wars
- Unveiled: 1926
- Location: 52°14′14″N 00°53′45″W; Wood Hill, Northampton, England
- Designed by: Sir Edwin Lutyens

Listed Building – Grade I
- Official name: The Town and County War Memorial
- Designated: 22 January 1976
- Reference no.: 1191327

Northampton War Memorial, officially the Town and County War Memorial, is a First World War memorial on Wood Hill in the centre of Northampton, the county town of Northamptonshire, in central England. Designed by architect Sir Edwin Lutyens, it is a Stone of Remembrance flanked by twin obelisks draped with painted stone flags standing in a small garden in what was once part of the churchyard of All Saints' Church.

Discussion of a war memorial for Northampton began shortly after the armistice in 1918, and from July 1919 a temporary wooden cenotaph stood on Abington Street in the town centre. The Northamptonshire War Memorial Committee commissioned Lutyens to design a permanent memorial. The monument's design was completed and approved quickly, but its installation was delayed by six years until the site could be purchased from the Church of England, which required a faculty from the local diocese. The memorial was finally unveiled on 11 November 1926 after a service and a parade including local schoolchildren and civic leaders.

Northampton's memorial is one of the more elaborate town memorials in England. It uses three features characteristic of Lutyens's war memorials: a pair of obelisks, the Stone of Remembrance (which Lutyens designed for the Imperial War Graves Commission), and painted stone flags on the obelisks, which were rejected for his Cenotaph in London but feature on several of his other memorials. Today it is a Grade I listed building; it was upgraded from Grade II in 2015 when Lutyens's war memorials were declared a "national collection" and all were granted listed building status or had their listing renewed.

== Background ==
The First World War produced casualties on an unprecedented scale. Men from every town and village in Northamptonshire died in the war, with the exception of two thankful villages (East Carlton in the north of the county and Woodend in the south). In the war's aftermath, thousands of memorials were built across Britain.

Among the most prominent designers of war memorials was architect Sir Edwin Lutyens, who was described by Historic England as "the leading English architect of his generation". Prior to the First World War, Lutyens established his reputation designing country houses for wealthy patrons; in the war's aftermath, he devoted much of his time to memorialising the casualties. He served as one of the three principal architects to the Imperial War Graves Commission (IWGC; later the Commonwealth War Graves Commission, CWGC) and designed numerous war memorials for towns and villages across Britain, as well as several elsewhere in the Commonwealth. He was responsible for The Cenotaph on Whitehall in London, which became the focal point of the national Remembrance Sunday commemorations; the Thiepval Memorial to the Missing, the largest British war memorial anywhere in the world; and the Stone of Remembrance (also known as the Great War Stone), which appears in all large Commonwealth War Graves Commission cemeteries and forms part of several of his civic memorials, including Northampton's.

== Commissioning ==
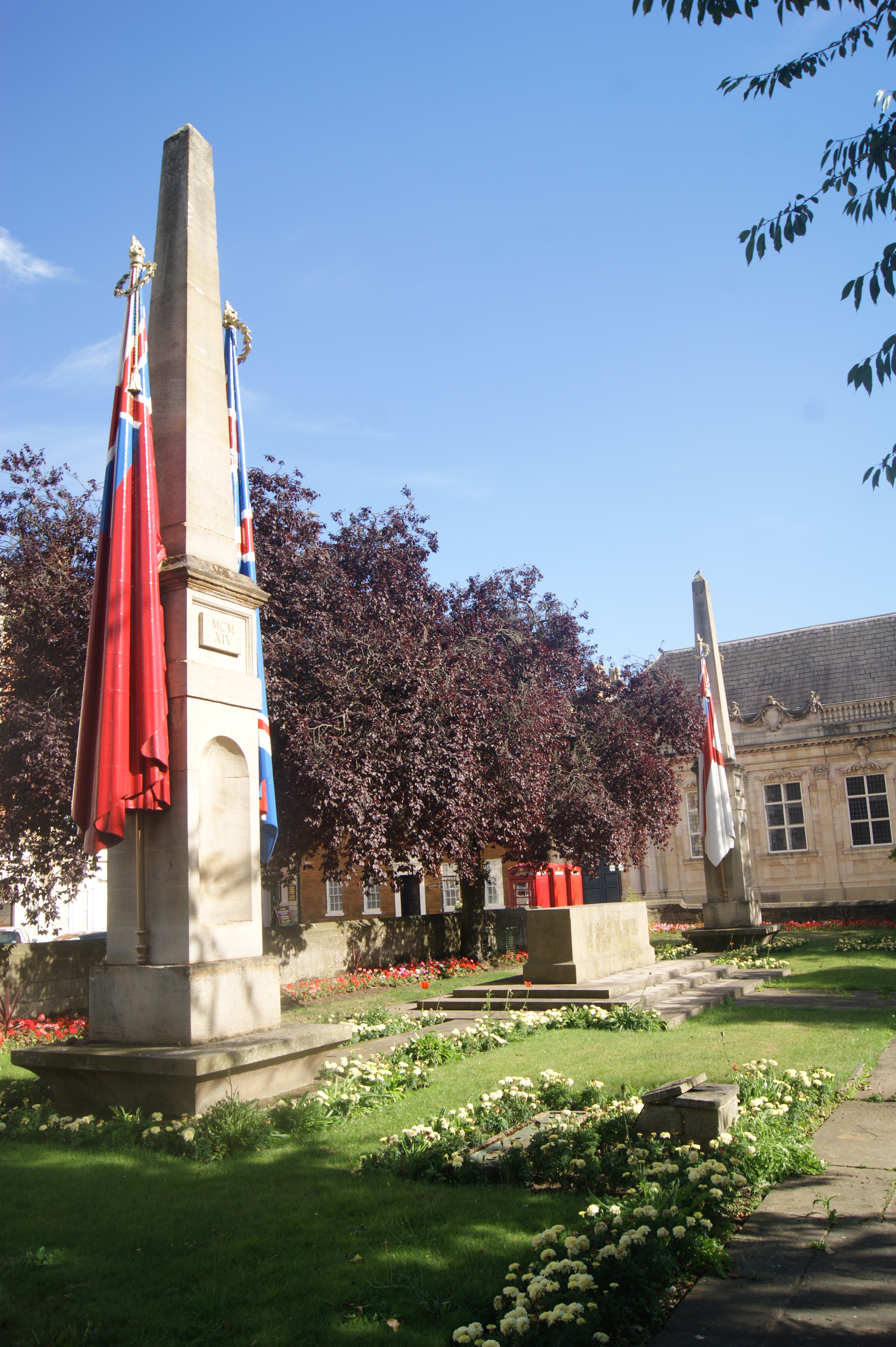
The memorial from the west side, with three of the four painted flags visible

Northampton's first war memorial was a temporary cenotaph built from wood and plaster which stood in Abington Street from July 1919 as a placeholder until a more permanent memorial could be erected; the temporary cenotaph was the focal point for remembrance services until the installation of the permanent memorial. As in several towns and cities, there were discussions within the town as to whether its war memorial should serve a purely monumental purpose or some sort of community function. Suggestions included renovating civic buildings, a new 2,000-seat concert hall, and a classical-style arch on Guildhall road. The Northamptonshire War Memorial Committee, chaired by local landowner Lord Lilford, eventually commissioned Lutyens to design a purely commemorative monument, and selected a site in part of the churchyard of All Saints' Church. The memorial was funded by public donations, including a donation of £50 from Lord Lilford.

Lutyens's designs were complete by 1920 and approved in November of that year, but as the chosen site was part of the churchyard, and several graves would have to be relocated to accommodate the memorial, the war memorial committee had to seek a faculty from the Diocese of Peterborough (the diocese in whose jurisdiction Northampton falls), which delayed the installation. The Reverend Geoffrey Warden, vicar of All Saints' Church, submitted the application in 1922, supported by two church wardens and two parishioners. Construction work commenced only in 1926, six years after the completion of the designs. By July 1926, the Northampton Independent reported that the obelisks had been carved and were waiting for the flags to be painted before they could be erected.

== Design ==
Northampton's is a comparatively elaborate war memorial, especially for a town rather than a city. It consists of a Stone of Remembrance flanked by tall twin obelisks, each adorned with a pair of painted stone flags. Its use of obelisks, a Stone of Remembrance, and painted flags—all features characteristic of Lutyens's war memorials—make it particularly significant among his works.

Each obelisk sits on a tall, four-tiered rectangular column which itself stands on a wider, undercut square plinth. The obelisks and their supporting columns are ornately decorated. A narrow cross is set into the obelisks while the town's coat of arms is moulded onto the columns; the columns contain deep decorative niches, forming an arch shape beneath the obelisks. Obelisks feature in several of Lutyens's war memorials, though only Northampton's and Manchester's use a pair of flanking obelisks (in Manchester's case, the obelisks flank a cenotaph, rather than a stone); both are particularly fine designs in which Lutyens uses the obelisks with "dignity and simple dramatic effect", according to historian Richard Barnes. The obelisks are inscribed with the dates of the First and Second World Wars in Roman numerals (the inscriptions relating to the Second World War were added at a later date).

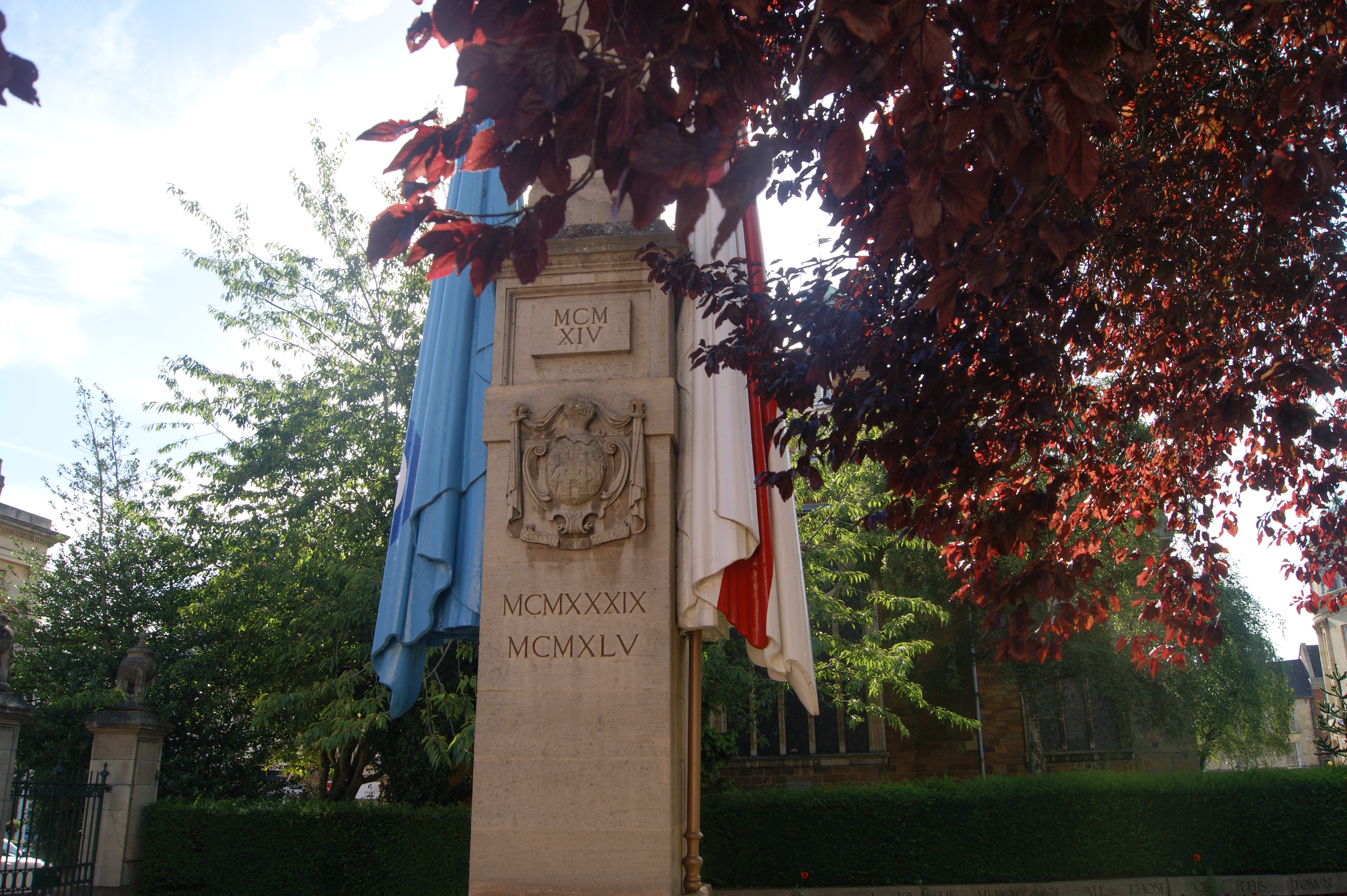
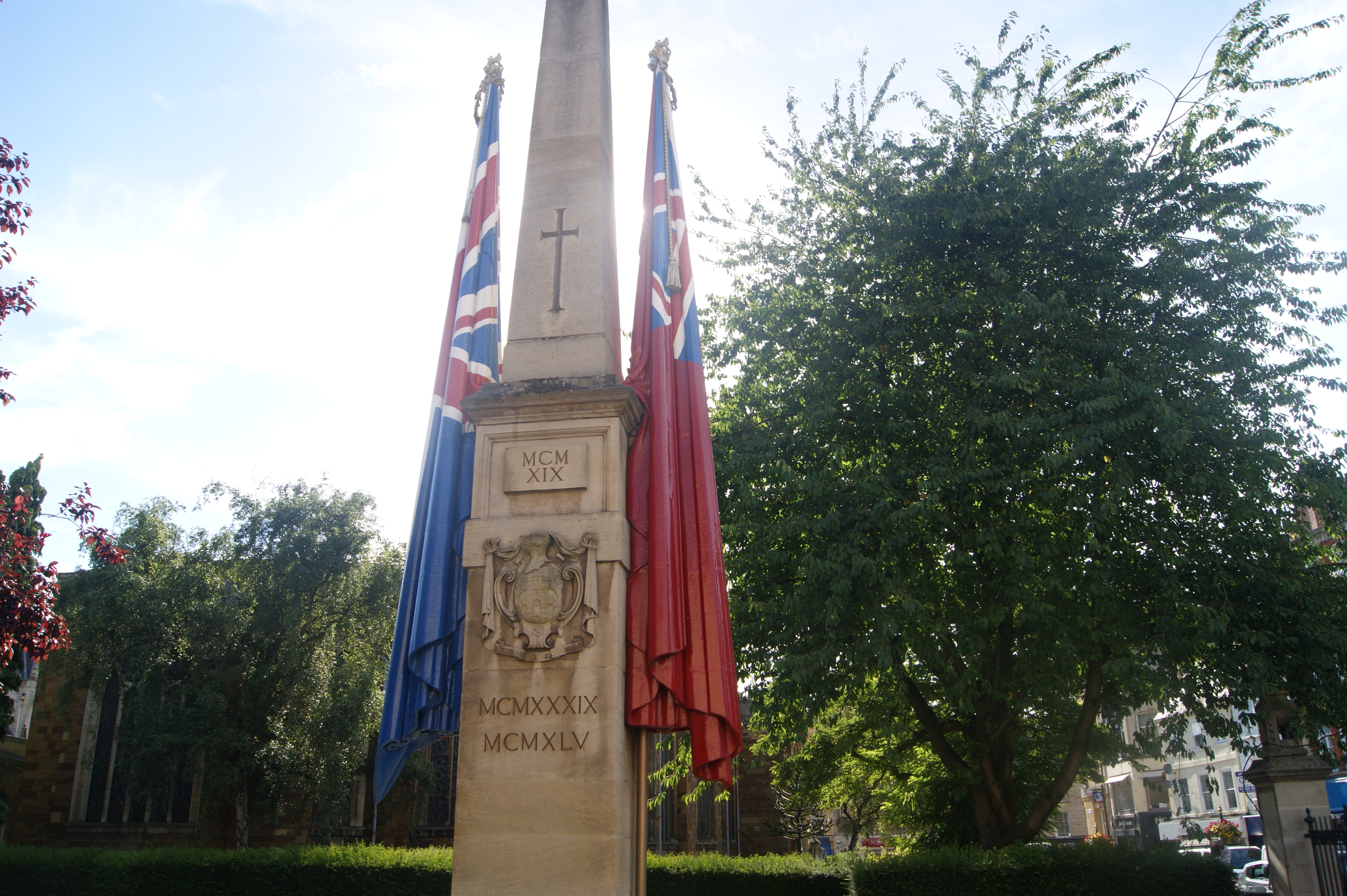
Close-ups of the obelisks showing the decorative carving and the draped stone flags

Two stone flags—painted in the form of the Union Flag and the flags of the Royal Navy (the White Ensign), Merchant Navy (the Red Ensign), and Royal Air Force (the RAF Ensign)—appear to hang from each obelisk, draping around the cornices; each flag is surmounted by gold wreaths. Lutyens first proposed stone flags for use on the Cenotaph on Whitehall, but the proposal was rejected in favour of fabric flags (though they were used on several other memorials, including Rochdale Cenotaph and the Arch of Remembrance in Leicester). The stone is a monolith (carved from a single piece of rock), curved so slightly as to barely be visible to the naked eye, 12 feet (3.7 metres) long and devoid of any decoration beyond the inscriptions. Unusually, the Stone of Remembrance is inscribed on both faces. The east face bears the inscription Lutyens chose for all his Stones of Remembrance: "THEIR NAME LIVETH / FOR EVERMORE", as suggested by Rudyard Kipling, truncated from a verse in the Book of Ecclesiasticus; the west face is inscribed "THE SOULS OF THE RIGHTEOUS / ARE IN THE HANDS OF GOD", from The Wisdom of Solomon.

The whole memorial is raised on a stone platform that forms a narrow path between the stone and the obelisks. The Stone of Remembrance is further raised on three stone steps. The memorial stands in a small garden now just outside the All Saints' churchyard, defined by a low stone wall to the front and a yew hedge to the rear with ornamental gateways to either side. The gates are of cast iron and supported by large stone piers with urn finials. The wall is inscribed: "TO THE MEMORY OF ALL THOSE OF THIS TOWN AND COUNTY WHO SERVED AND DIED IN THE GREAT WAR".

== History ==
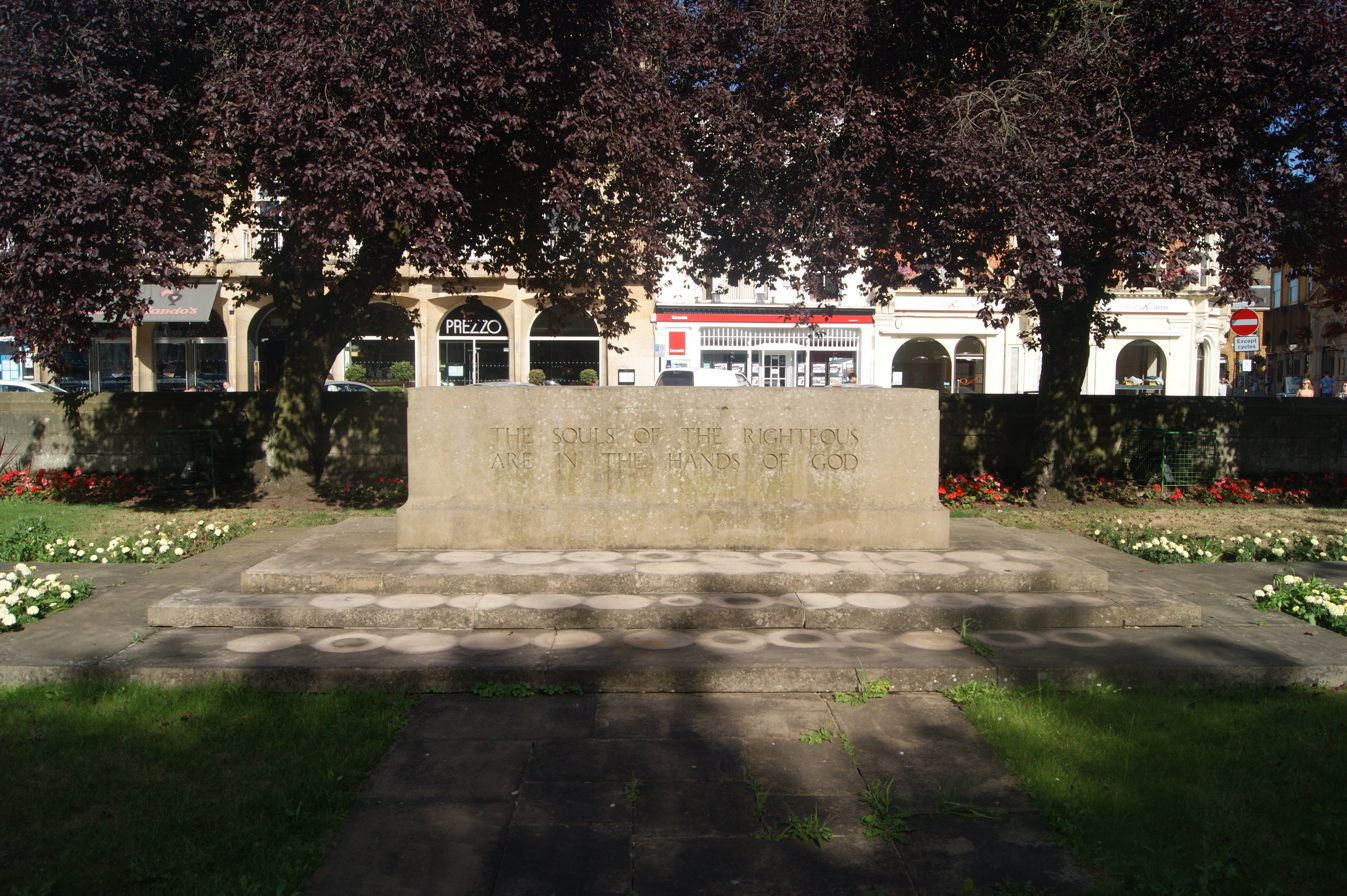
The Stone of Remembrance in the centre of the memorial; Lutyens designed the stone for the Imperial War Graves Commission's cemeteries but it also features in several of his war memorials.

The memorial was eventually unveiled on 11 November (Armistice Day) 1926, as part of a large ecumenical service, which included 5,000 local schoolchildren. Attendance was so great that the service could not be accommodated in the church and was instead held in the market square. At the conclusion of the service, the crowd proceeded to the new memorial; the parade was led by veterans from the Battle of Mons and included other military representatives, nurses from Northampton General Hospital, and the town's civic leaders. Once in the square, the unveiling was performed by General Henry Horne, 1st Baron Horne and the memorial was dedicated by the Right Reverend Norman Lang, Suffragan Bishop of Leicester. Horne committed the memorial to the care of the town's mayor and Northamptonshire County Council, and in his speech referred to Northampton's role as the county town; he observed that communities across Northamptonshire would be erecting their own memorials, but felt that it was "right and fitting that there should stand in the county town some visible monument, some tangible memorial appealing to the heart through the eye, of the bravery, devotion to duty, and self-sacrifice of the men of Northamptonshire". The Prince of Wales laid a wreath during a ceremony on 7 July 1927, the year after the unveiling.

The Town and County War Memorial does not contain a list of casualties. The local branch of the Royal British Legion launched a campaign for a memorial dedicated to the town and containing a list of names. A garden of remembrance was built in Abington Square, the location of the original temporary cenotaph, and unveiled by Major General Sir John Brown in 1937; the names of the fallen were inscribed on the garden walls. The memorial to Edgar Mobbs—a professional rugby player from Northampton who was killed in the First World War in 1917—was moved into the garden.

The memorial was designated a Grade II* listed building on 22 January 1976. In November 2015, as part of commemorations for the centenary of the First World War, Lutyens's war memorials were recognised as a "national collection". All 44 of his free-standing memorials in England were listed or had their listing status reviewed and their National Heritage List for England list entries updated and expanded. As part of this process, Northampton War Memorial was upgraded to Grade I.

== See also ==
- Lancashire Fusiliers War Memorial, a Lutyens memorial featuring a similar obelisk in Bury
- Grade I listed buildings in Northamptonshire
- Grade I listed war memorials in England
