= John Chambers =

John Chambers may refer to:

== Academics ==
- John Chambers (scientist), one of two scientists who formulated the Planet V theory in 2002
- John Chambers (statistician), creator of the S programming language and core member of the R programming language project
- John Chambers (topographer) (1780–1839), English antiquarian

== Artists ==
- John Chambers (artist) (1852–1928), British landscape, seascape and portrait painter
- John Chambers (make-up artist) (1922–2001), American make-up artist, won a special Oscar for his work on Planet of the Apes

== Businessmen ==
- John Chambers (Australian pastoralist) (c. 1815–1889), Australian pioneer, brother of James Chambers (pastoralist)
- John Chambers (pastoralist) (1819–1893), New Zealand pastoralist, community leader and businessman
- John Chambers (businessman) (c. 1839–1903), New Zealand businessman
- John T. Chambers (born 1949), American businessman and former CEO of Cisco Systems

== Clergy ==
- John Chambre (1470–1549), also Chambers, English churchman, academic and physician
- John Chambers (bishop) (died 1556), last abbot of Peterborough abbey and, after the dissolution, the first bishop of Peterborough
- John David Chambers (1805–1893), English legal and liturgical writer

== Politicians ==
- John Chambers (politician) (1780–1852), American politician, governor of Iowa Territory in 1841–1845
- John G. Chambers (Delaware politician), member of the 67th Delaware General Assembly
- John Green Chambers (1798–1884), American politician from Texas
- John M. Chambers (politician) (1845–1916), Irish-American businessman and politician from New York
- John Chambers Hughes (1891–1971), United States diplomat
- John Thomas Chambers Jr. (1928–2011), American politician from Maryland

== Sportsmen ==
- John Chambers (Australian cricketer) (1930–2017), Australian cricketer
- John Chambers (English cricketer) (born 1971), English cricketer
- John Chambers (footballer) (born 1949), English footballer
- Johnnie Chambers (1911–1977), American baseball player
- John Graham Chambers (1843–1883), codified the "Marquess of Queensberry rules", upon which modern day boxing is based

== Others ==
- John B. Chambers (born 1956), evaluator of sovereign debt for Standard & Poor's
- John Chambers (writer), American television soap opera writer

== Fictional characters ==
- Johnny Quick, a DC Comics character whose real name was Johnny Chambers
- Joanna "Johnny" Chambers, one of the two main characters in the 2020 novel Beneath the Rising

== See also ==
- Jack Chambers (disambiguation)
- John Chamber (disambiguation)
