= William Piers =

William Piers may refer to:

- William Piers (bishop), vice-chancellor of Oxford University, bishop of Peterborough, and of Bath and Wells
- William Piers (constable), English constable in Ireland
- William Piers (priest), English Anglican priest
- William Piers (MP), British Whig politician
