= Pagit =

Pagit is a surname. Notable people with the surname include:

- Ephraim Pagit (1575–1647), English clergyman and heresiographer
- Eusebius Pagit (1551–1617), English nonconformist clergyman
