= John M. Chambers =

John M. Chambers may refer to:

- John Chambers (statistician) (John McKinley Chambers), creator of the S programming language and core member of the R programming language project
- John M. Chambers (politician), Irish-American businessman and politician from New York

== See also ==
- John Chambers (disambiguation)
