= John Griffiths (footballer, born 1951) =

English footballer

Personal information
- Full name: John Griffiths
- Date of birth: 16 June 1951 (age 75)
- Place of birth: Oldbury, England
- Position: Midfielder

Youth career
- 1966–1968: Aston Villa

Senior career*
Years	Team	Apps	(Gls)
1968–1970	Aston Villa	3	(0)
1970–1975	Stockport County	182	(31)
1975–19??	Kidderminster Harriers		
- * Club domestic league appearances and goals

John Griffiths (born 16 June 1951) is an English former professional footballer who made 185 appearances in the Football League playing as a midfielder for Aston Villa and Stockport County. He also played non-league football for Kidderminster Harriers. Griffiths was born in 1951 in Oldbury, Worcestershire, and represented Oldbury & West Smethwick Schools before joining Aston Villa as an apprentice in 1966.
