= John Chamber =

John Chamber may refer to:

- John Chamber (academic) (1546–1604), English clergyman and author, especially on astronomy and astrology
- John Chambre (1470–1549), also Chamber or Chambers, English clergyman, academic and physician

== See also ==
- John Chambers (disambiguation)
