= Lindsell (surname) =

Lindsell is a surname. Notable people with the surname include:

- Augustine Lindsell (died 1634), English classical scholar and Bishop of Hereford
- Harold Lindsell (1913–1998), evangelical Christian author and scholar
- Stuart Lindsell (1892–1969), British actor
- Wilfrid Gordon Lindsell (1884–1973), British Army logistics officer
