= John Chambers (bishop) =

English Benedictine and bishop (died 1556)

John Chambers (died 1556) was an English Benedictine, the last Abbot of Peterborough and first Bishop of Peterborough.

== Life ==
He was born in Peterborough and was sometimes called Burgh or Borowe. He became a monk in the abbey there, and was elected its abbot in 1528. He was studied both at Oxford and Cambridge Universities; he took a Cambridge M.A. in 1505, and was B.D. in 1539. In 1530 Chambers as Abbot received Thomas Wolsey, then on his last progress to the Province of York. The cardinal kept Easter at Peterborough with great state. After Wolsey's fall Chambers maintained his position, with only some external modifications, to the end of his life.

When Richard Layton, the agent of Henry VIII in the dissolution of the monasteries, accompanied by Richard, the nephew of Thomas Cromwell, was at Ramsey Abbey, and had marked down Peterborough as his next target, Chambers contacted Sir William Parr, hoping by bribery to save his abbey. Chambers discreetly made no further resistance. The abbey was surrendered to the king in 1539, Chambers being appointed guardian of the temporalities, with an annual pension. He became one of the royal chaplains and proceeded to his degree of B.D. at Cambridge the same year (1539). Chambers had support from Lord Russell in the direction of Cromwell.

On 4 September 1541 letters patent were issued converting the abbey church of Peterborough into a cathedral church, with a dean and chapter and ecclesiastical staff. King Henry also erected a monument to Catherine of Aragon, who had been buried in the abbey church in January 1536. Chambers now became the first bishop of the new see, with a residence on the site, and the prior of St Andrew's at Northampton became the dean. The new bishop was consecrated in his former abbey church 23 October 1541, by Bishop Thomas Goodrich of Ely, assisted by his suffragan, Robert Blyth, bishop of Dover, and the suffragan of the bishop of Lincoln, Thomas Hallam, titular bishop of Philadelphia. According to Thomas Fuller, Chambers was appointed by the convocation of 1542, in conjunction with John Wakeman of Gloucester, to revise the translation of the Apocalypse for the proposed new edition of the Great Bible.

He died on 7 February 1556 and was buried in the choir of his cathedral on 6 March. There were formerly two monuments to him, both destroyed during the English Civil War. Chambers has been erroneously identified with John Chambre, a doctor of physic, of Merton College, Oxford, who became dean of St Stephen's, Westminster, and died in 1549.

Church of England titles
Preceded by initial appointment	Bishop of Peterborough; 1541–1556	Succeeded by David Pole
