= William Redman (bishop) =

English bishop

- Bishop of Norwich
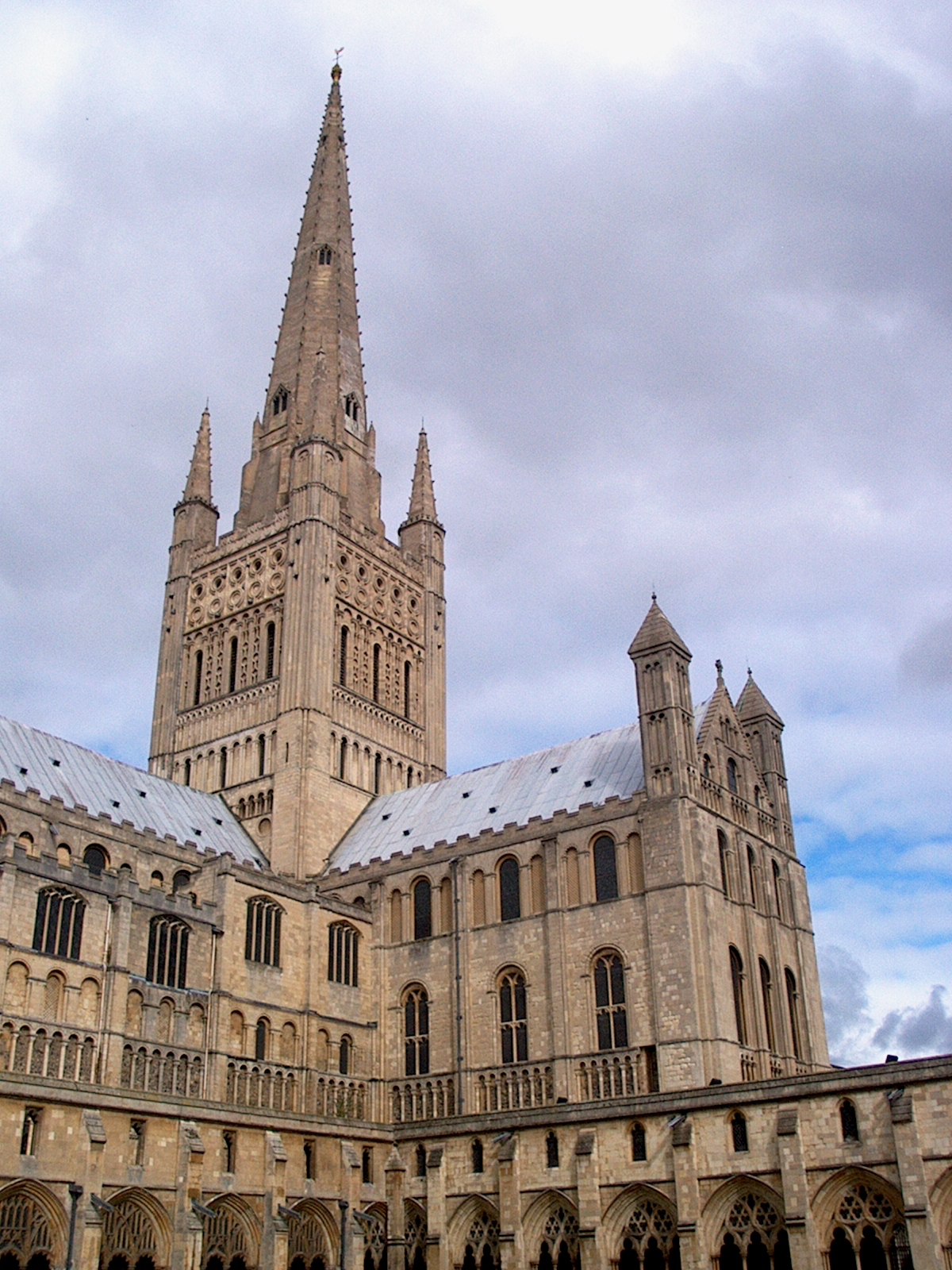
- Spire and south transept, Norwich Cathedral
- Church: Church of England
- Diocese: Diocese of Norwich
- Elected: 17 December 1594
- Term ended: 1602 (death)
- Predecessor: Edmund Scambler
- Successor: John Jegon
- Other posts: Archdeacon of Canterbury (1576–?)

Orders
- Ordination: 1570
- Consecration: 10 January 1595

Personal details
- Born: c. 1541–1542
- Died: 25 September 1602 (aged approximately 60–61)
- Denomination: Anglican
- Spouse: 1. Elizabeth Hanchett; 2. Isabel Calverley
- Education: Trinity College, Cambridge

William Redman (c. 1541/2 – 25 September 1602) was an English bishop.

== Early life ==
He was educated at Trinity College, Cambridge from 1559, gaining his BA in 1562/3 and becoming a fellow of Trinity in 1563.

== Career ==
Ordained in 1570, he was made Archdeacon of Canterbury by Edmund Grindal in 1576. He was elected Bishop of Norwich on 17 December 1594, and consecrated on 10 January 1595.

== Family ==
Redman married twice, first to Elizabeth Hanchett and secondly to Isabel Calverley.

Church of England titles
Preceded by Edmund Scambler	Bishop of Norwich; 1594–1602	Succeeded by John Jegon
