= Francis Thicknesse =

Francis Henry Thicknesse (né Coldwell; 14 May 1829 – 2 November 1921) was the inaugural Bishop suffragan of Leicester from 1888 until 1903.

He was born Francis Henry Coldwell, son of William Edward Coldwell, Prebendary of Lichfield and Rector of Stafford. He changed his name by royal licence to Thicknesse when he married Anne Thicknesse, daughter and sole heir of Ralph Anthony Thicknesse (MP for Wigan), in Clitheroe on 3 July 1855. The marriage yielded five sons and two daughters. One son, Philip Coldwell Thicknesse, became an architect in Liverpool.

He was educated at Bridgnorth Grammar School and Brasenose College, Oxford. He was ordained in 1853 and two years later was made Vicar of Deane, Lancashire. Appointed Rural Dean of Bolton le Moors in 1857 he was later Archdeacon of Northampton before his appointment to the episcopate. His last post before retirement was as Rector of Oxendon, Northamptonshire. At his death he was the oldest Anglican Bishop. There is a memorial to him in Wigan Parish Church.

Church of England titles
| New seat | Bishop of Leicester; 1888–1903 | Succeeded by Lewis Clayton |
