= Edmund Scambler =

English bishop

The Right Reverend Edmund Scambler
- Bishop of Norwich
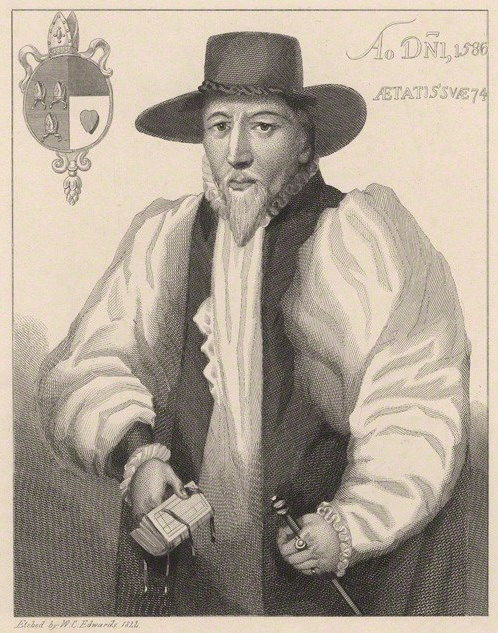
- Church: Church of England
- Diocese: Diocese of Norwich
- Installed: 1585
- Term ended: 1594 (death)
- Predecessor: Edmund Freke
- Successor: William Redman
- Other post: Bishop of Peterborough (1561–1585)

Orders
- Consecration: 16 February 1561 by Matthew Parker

Personal details
- Born: c. 1520 Gressingham, Lancashire
- Died: 7 May 1594
- Denomination: Anglican
- Education: Peterhouse, Cambridge

Edmund Scambler (c. 1520 – 7 May 1594) was an English bishop from Cambridge University. He served as pastor under Queen Mary Tudor.

== Life ==
He was born at Gressingham, and was educated at Peterhouse, Cambridge, Queens' College, Cambridge and Jesus College, Cambridge, graduating B.A. in 1542.

Under Mary I of England he was pastor to a covert Protestant congregation in London. He was a chaplain to Archbishop Matthew Parker.

He became Bishop of Peterborough in 1561, and was a reviser of the Bishops' Bible. He suspended Eusebius Pagit, then vicar of Lamport, in 1574.

In 1585 he became Bishop of Norwich. He was responsible there for the heresy proceedings against Francis Kett.

== Notes ==
Church of England titles
| Preceded by David Poole | Bishop of Peterborough; 1561–1584 | Succeeded by Richard Howland |
| Preceded by Edmund Freke | Bishop of Norwich; 1585–1594 | Succeeded by William Redman |
