= David Pole (bishop) =

English Roman Catholic churchman and jurist

The Right Reverend David Pole
- Bishop of Peterborough
- Church: Roman Catholic
- Diocese: Peterborough
- Appointed: 24 Mar 1557
- Term ended: 1559
- Predecessor: John Chambers
- Successor: Edmund Scambler

Orders
- Consecration: 15 August 1557 by Nicholas Heath

Personal details
- Died: May 1568

David Pole (or Poole) (died May 1568) was an English Roman Catholic churchman and jurist; he was Bishop of Peterborough from 1557 until deprived by Queen Elizabeth I.

== Life ==
He was a fellow of All Souls' College, Oxford, in 1520. He devoted himself to civil law, and graduated B.Can.L. on 2 July 1526 and D.Can.L. on 17 February 1527 – 1528. In 1529 he became an advocate in Doctors' Commons. He was connected with the diocese of Lichfield, where he held preferments, first under Bishop Geoffrey Blyth, and then under Bishop Rowland Lee. He was made prebendary of Tachbrook in Lichfield Cathedral on 11 April 1531, archdeacon of Salop in April 1536, and archdeacon of Derby on 8 January 1543.

He received the appointment of dean of the arches and vicar-general of the archbishop of Canterbury on 14 November 1540. A conscientious adherent of the Roman Catholic faith, he occupied several positions of importance during Queen Mary's reign. In her first year he acted as vicar-general of the bishop of Lichfield, Richard Sampson, and commissioner for the deprivation of married priests, and in his capacity of archdeacon he sat on the commission for the deprivation of Thomas Cranmer, Nicholas Ridley, and Hugh Latimer, and the restoration of Edmund Bonner and other deprived bishops. He stood high in the favour of Cardinal Pole, said to have been a relative, who appointed him his vicar-general. During the vacancy of the see of Lichfield on Bishop Sampson's death in 1554, he was appointed commissary for the diocese. In the early part of the same year he took part in the condemnation of John Hooper and Rowland Taylor. On 25 April 1556 he was appointed on the commission to inquire after heretics, and to proceed against them.

On the death of John Chambers, the first bishop of the newly formed diocese of Peterborough, the queen sent letters commendatory to Pope Paul IV in Pole's favour. He was consecrated at Chiswick on 15 August 1557 by Nicholas Heath, archbishop of York. He shortly sanctioned the execution of John Kurde, a Protestant shoemaker, who was burnt at Northampton on 20 September 1557.

On the accession of Elizabeth, he was on the first abortive commission for the consecration of Matthew Parker as archbishop, 9 September 1559. In the same year he, with Bonner and two other prelates, signed Archbishop Heath's letter of remonstrance to Elizabeth, begging her to return to the Catholic faith. His refusal to take the oath under the act of supremacy was followed by his deprivation; but he was treated leniently by the queen. Allowed to live on parole in London or its suburbs, he died on one of his farms in May or June 1568. His property he left to his friends, and his books on law and theology to his college, All Souls'.

== Footnotes ==
Church of England titles
Preceded by John Chambers	Bishop of Peterborough; 1557–1559	Succeeded by Edmund Scambler
