= Francis Dee =

English churchman

Francis Dee (before 1580 – 8 October 1638) was an English churchman and Bishop of Peterborough from 1634.

He was the son of the Rev. David Dee of St Mary Hall, Oxford, who held the rectory of St Bartholomew-the-Great, West Smithfield from 1587 to 1605, when he was constrained. Francis Dee was born in London, and was admitted a scholar of Merchant Taylors' School on 26 April 1591. He proceeded to St. John's College, Cambridge, where he was admitted in 1595 and became a scholar on the Billingsley foundation in 1596. He took his degree of M.A. in 1603, B.D. in 1610, and D.D. in 1617.

In 1606, the year after his father's deprivation, he was appointed to the rectory of Holy Trinity the Less in the city of London, which he resigned in 1620. In 1615 he became rector of Allhallows, Lombard Street, and held the benefice with his other preferments till his elevation to the episcopate. In 1619 he received the chancellorship of Salisbury Cathedral. In 1629 he seems to have been chaplain to the English ambassador in Paris; he forwarded to William Laud a petition from a John Fincham, in France on the king's service and imprisoned in the Bastille.

In 1630 he was one of the assistants in the foundation of Sion College. He became Dean of Chichester 30 April 1630. He was consecrated bishop of Peterborough at Lambeth by Archbishop Laud, assisted by William Juxon, on 18 May 1634, and was enthroned by proxy on 28 May. In his diocese, as elsewhere, the order for placing the communion table altarwise at the east end of the chancel, and fencing it in with rails, produced discontent among the clergy, and Dee received frequent instructions from the high court of commission to proceed against those who refused to obey. Dee died at Peterborough on 8 October 1638 and was buried in his cathedral. By his will, dated 28 May 1638, he donated to the repair of his cathedral, and to St. John's College the impropriate rectory of Pagham for the foundation of two scholars and two fellows to be chosen from Peterborough grammar school. He also bequeathed to the college works in Hebrew, Greek, and Latin, and his chapel plate. He was twice married: first to Susan le Poreque, and secondly to Elizabeth, daughter of John Winter, canon of Canterbury, by whom he left an only daughter, who married Brian King, canon of Chichester. He preached before the court in praise of virginity, which was considered tactless.

== Notes ==
Church of England titles
Preceded by Augustine Lindsell	Bishop of Peterborough; 1634–1638	Succeeded by John Towers
