= Eusebius Pagit =

English nonconformist clergyman

Eusebius Pagit (Pagett) (1551?-1617) was an English nonconformist clergyman.

== Life ==
He was born at Cranford St Andrew, Northamptonshire. At twelve years of age, he entered Christ Church, Oxford as a chorister. He was afterwards a student of Christ Church, reputed in philosophy. Though he is said to have taken no degree, Cole has identified him with the Eusebius Paget who matriculated at Christ's College, Cambridge, on 22 February 1564, and commenced B.A. in 1567. He then became vicar of Orundle and rector of Langton, and went on to serve at Kilhampton in Cornwall.

=== Suspension from his post ===
In 1571, he was suspended from preaching for not subscribing to the articles, and at this time, he had no benefice. On 21 April 1572, he was preferred to the rectory of Lamport, Northamptonshire. On 29 January 1574, he was cited before Edmund Scambler, then bishop of Peterborough, for nonconformity, was suspended, and shortly afterwards was deprived. He subscribed Thomas Cartwright's book of discipline (1574), and with John Oxenbridge, B.D., was arrested and taken to London by order from Archbishop Edmund Grindal, for taking a leading part in the presbyterian associations of Northamptonshire and Warwickshire.

Subsequently, he was presented to the rectory of Kilkhampton, Cornwall. He told the patron and the bishop (presumed to be John Wolton, elected 2 July 1579) that he could not conform in all points, and was admitted and inducted on this understanding. His ministry was popular. In March 1584, he was brought up before his ordinary and enjoined to an exact conformity. Towards the end of 1584, articles of accusation, founded on his preaching, were exhibited against him before the high commission by Farmer, curate of Barnstaple, Devon. He appeared before the commission, presided over by Archbishop John Whitgift, on 11 January 1585. The articles were dropped, and he was charged with refusing to use the prayer-book and to observe the ceremonies. In his written defence, he admitted his obligation to use the prayer-book authorised by the act of Uniformity 1558 (i.e., Edward VI's second prayer-book), and denied that he had ever refused to do so. He allowed that he had not exactly followed that book, but pleaded that there was no copy of it provided for his church; that greater liberty in varying from the statutory form than he had taken was used by Whitgift himself, by his bishop (Walton), and by other bishops and clergy; that his conscience would not allow him to follow the prescribed forms in every particular, and that his bishop had promised to refrain (as he legally might) from urging him to do so. He claimed a conference with his bishop or someone other to be appointed by the commission. He was immediately suspended.

On his preaching, without stipend, after suspension, he was deprived for ignoring the suspension, not using the surplice and the cross in baptism, and omitting parts of the prayers. Counsel's opinion adverse to the legality of the deprivation was brought forward without effect, and the living were filled up.

=== Later life ===
Pagit set up a school, but the high commission required him to take out a licence and subscribe to the articles. This he scrupled at. On 3 June 1591, he addressed an appeal to Sir John Hawkins, who had previously shown himself a friend, asking his intercession with Elizabeth. He stated that he abhorred schism, and had never been present in any separate assembly but had always adhered to and communicated in his parish church. He remained silent till the death of Whitgift (29 February 1604). On 21 September 1604, he obtained the rectory of St. Anne and St. Agnes, Aldersgate Street, London, which he held till his death.

He died in May or June 1617 and was buried in his church.

The preacher Ephraim Pagit was his son.

== Works ==
He published:

- A Godlie and Fruitefull Sermon . . . upon . . . what Provision ought to be made for the Mynister, &c. [1580 ?], 1583, (on tithes).
- A Godly Sermon . . . at Detford, 1586,
- A Catechism, 1591.
- The Historie of the Bible, briefly collected, by way of Question and Answer, &c., 1613, (often reprinted and translated into French and German).
- Short questions and answers conteining the summe of Christianity

His Latin Catechism is mentioned by Peter Heylyn, Aerius Redivivus, 1670, p. 350.

He translated John Calvin's harmony of the first three gospels with his commentary on St. John, A Harmonie vpon Matthew, Mark, &c., 1584.
