= 1986–87 FA Trophy =

1986-87 FA Trophy
FA Challenge Trophy

Tournament details
- Country: England; Wales
- Teams: 208

Final positions
- Champions: Kidderminster Harriers
- Runners-up: Burton Albion

The 1986–87 FA Trophy was the eighteenth season of the FA Trophy.

== Preliminary round ==
=== Ties ===
Tie	Home team	Score	Away team
1	Accrington Stanley	3-2	Bridlington Trinity
2	Andover	2-3	Harlow Town
3	Barnstaple Town	0-1	Maidenhead United
4	Hednesford Town	2-1	Sutton Town
5	Minehead	3-0	Llanelli
6	Stevenage Borough	1-0	Dunstable
7	Tonbridge	1-3	Dover Athletic
8	Wellingborough Town	6-1	Burnham & Hillingdon

== First qualifying round ==
=== Ties ===
Tie	Home team	Score	Away team
1	Accrington Stanley	1-1	Goole Town
2	Alfreton Town	5-3	Oswestry Town
3	Aveley	0-0	Leatherhead
4	Aylesbury United	3-1	Billericay Town
5	Basildon United	1-1	Staines Town
6	Basingstoke Town	0-0	Sheppey United
7	Bedworth United	0-2	Hednesford Town
8	Billingham Synthonia	1-0	Spennymoor United
9	Bognor Regis Town	1-1	Ashford Town (Kent)
10	Bootle	3-0	Penrith
11	Boreham Wood	2-2	Hornchurch
12	Bracknell Town	5-2	Waterlooville
13	Brandon United	0-1	Crook Town
14	Chesham United	3-0	Erith & Belvedere
15	Chester-Le-Street Town	3-5	Newcastle Blue Star
16	Colwyn Bay	1-0	Witton Albion
17	Cwmbran Town	2-5	Melksham Town
18	Easington Colliery	1-0	Chorley
19	Fareham Town	5-0	Epsom & Ewell
20	Forest Green Rovers	2-4	Bideford
21	Formby	1-2	Consett
22	Frome Town	1-1	Saltash United
23	Grantham	2-0	Arnold
24	Gretna	2-2	Whitley Bay
25	Hampton	3-1	Uxbridge
26	Harlow Town	0-3	Hendon
27	Hayes	1-1	Canterbury City
28	Horwich R M I	3-2	Ferryhill Athletic
29	Ilkeston Town	0-2	Moor Green
30	Kingstonian	2-0	Finchley
31	Leicester United	8-1	Heanor Town
32	Lewes	0-1	Southwick
33	Leyton Wingate	1-1	Bromley
34	Leytonstone Ilford	1-3	Oxford City
35	Maesteg Park	2-1	Gosport Borough
36	Maidenhead United	0-0	Clandown
37	Minehead	0-3	Dorchester Town
38	Mossley	1-0	Stalybridge Celtic
39	Netherfield	1-1	Radcliffe Borough
40	Oldbury United	0-2	Leamington
41	Peterlee Newtown	0-2	Tow Law Town
42	Poole Town	4-4	Taunton Town
43	Ryhope Community Association	1-1	Congleton Town
44	Salisbury	1-3	Weston Super Mare
45	Shepshed Charterhouse	1-1	Caernarfon Town
46	Sittingbourne	1-2	Chatham Town
47	South Liverpool	1-1	Billingham Town
48	St Albans City	4-0	Banbury United
49	Stevenage Borough	3-2	Kingsbury Town
50	Stourbridge	1-0	Redditch United
51	Sutton Coldfield Town	0-1	Eastwood Town
52	Thanet United	1-1	Dover Athletic
53	Tilbury	1-3	Hitchin Town
54	Ton Pentre	3-2	Barry Town
55	Trowbridge Town	4-0	Gloucester City
56	V S Rugby	4-0	Buxton
57	Walthamstow Avenue	0-1	Wembley
58	Walton & Hersham	6-1	Folkestone
59	Wellingborough Town	0-2	Cambridge City
60	Winsford United	1-2	Dudley Town
61	Witney Town	1-1	Gravesend & Northfleet
62	Woking	0-1	Tooting & Mitcham United
63	Workington	1-1	Glossop
64	Worksop Town	4-2	Leyland Motors

=== Replays ===
Tie	Home team	Score	Away team
1	Goole Town	3-0	Accrington Stanley
3	Leatherhead	4-2	Aveley
5	Staines Town	2-0	Basildon United
6	Sheppey United	1-1	Basingstoke Town
9	Ashford Town (Kent)	5-1	Bognor Regis Town
11	Hornchurch	1-3	Boreham Wood
22	Saltash United	3-2	Frome Town
24	Whitley Bay	2-0	Gretna
27	Canterbury City	3-3	Hayes
33	Bromley	1-0	Leyton Wingate
36	Clandown	0-1	Maidenhead United
39	Radcliffe Borough	4-2	Netherfield
42	Taunton Town	1-1	Poole Town
43	Congleton Town	2-1	Ryhope Community Association
45	Caernarfon Town	2-3	Shepshed Charterhouse
47	Billingham Town	0-1	South Liverpool
52	Dover Athletic	1-0	Thanet United
61	Gravesend & Northfleet	1-2	Witney Town
63	Glossop	1-0	Workington

=== 2nd replays ===
Tie	Home team	Score	Away team
6	Sheppey United	2-3	Basingstoke Town
27	Canterbury City	1-0	Hayes
42	Poole Town	0-1	Taunton Town

== Second qualifying round ==
=== Ties ===
Tie	Home team	Score	Away team
1	Ashford Town (Kent)	2-1	Chatham Town
2	Bootle	2-5	Newcastle Blue Star
3	Boreham Wood	1-1	Stevenage Borough
4	Bracknell Town	2-4	Basingstoke Town
5	Canterbury City	1-0	Southwick
6	Chesham United	0-3	St Albans City
7	Colwyn Bay	0-4	Leicester United
8	Congleton Town	2-3	Mossley
9	Crook Town	2-0	Easington Colliery
10	Dover Athletic	1-2	Leatherhead
11	Dudley Town	1-1	Shepshed Charterhouse
12	Goole Town	3-1	Radcliffe Borough
13	Grantham	2-1	Moor Green
14	Hampton	1-2	Hitchin Town
15	Hednesford Town	1-0	Eastwood Town
16	Horwich R M I	0-0	Consett
17	Kingstonian	0-4	Wembley
18	Leamington	1-1	V S Rugby
19	Maidenhead United	4-3	Melksham Town
20	Oxford City	1-1	Cambridge City
21	Saltash United	3-2	Maesteg Park
22	South Liverpool	4-0	Billingham Synthonia
23	Staines Town	1-1	Bromley
24	Stourbridge	0-2	Alfreton Town
25	Taunton Town	0-1	Weston Super Mare
26	Ton Pentre	1-1	Dorchester Town
27	Tooting & Mitcham United	1-0	Hendon
28	Tow Law Town	2-2	Worksop Town
29	Trowbridge Town	3-1	Bideford
30	Walton & Hersham	1-2	Fareham Town
31	Whitley Bay	2-0	Glossop
32	Witney Town	0-2	Aylesbury United

=== Replays ===
Tie	Home team	Score	Away team
3	Stevenage Borough	1-2	Boreham Wood
11	Shepshed Charterhouse	2-1	Dudley Town
16	Consett	2-1	Horwich R M I
18	V S Rugby	0-1	Leamington
20	Cambridge City	4-0	Oxford City
23	Bromley	0-0	Staines Town
26	Dorchester Town	3-0	Ton Pentre
28	Worksop Town	1-3	Tow Law Town

=== 2nd replay ===
Tie	Home team	Score	Away team
23	Staines Town	1-0	Bromley

== Third qualifying round ==
=== Ties ===
Tie	Home team	Score	Away team
1	Alvechurch	0-2	St Albans City
2	Aylesbury United	4-1	Leicester United
3	Barking	4-1	Croydon
4	Barrow	1-0	North Shields
5	Basingstoke Town	1-1	Weston Super Mare
6	Bedlington Terriers	0-3	Crook Town
7	Blyth Spartans	2-0	South Liverpool
8	Bridgend Town	1-3	Saltash United
9	Canterbury City	0-3	Harrow Borough
10	Consett	1-2	Leek Town
11	Corby Town	2-1	Fisher Athletic
12	Fareham Town	2-1	Farnborough Town
13	Gainsborough Trinity	4-3	Matlock Town
14	Grays Athletic	1-1	Dulwich Hamlet
15	Hednesford Town	1-3	Morecambe
16	Hitchin Town	1-0	Carshalton Athletic
17	Hyde United	3-3	Mossley
18	King's Lynn	1-1	Nuneaton Borough
19	Leamington	0-3	Cambridge City
20	Leatherhead	1-0	Shepshed Charterhouse
21	Macclesfield Town	1-1	Grantham
22	Merthyr Tydfil	1-0	Windsor & Eton
23	Newcastle Blue Star	2-0	Alfreton Town
24	Slough Town	0-0	Tooting & Mitcham United
25	Staines Town	1-2	Boreham Wood
26	Tow Law Town	1-3	Rhyl
27	Trowbridge Town	4-0	Maidenhead United
28	Wembley	2-2	Crawley Town
29	Whitby Town	1-1	Southport
30	Whitley Bay	3-2	Goole Town
31	Willenhall Town	2-2	Ashford Town (Kent)
32	Wokingham Town	1-0	Dorchester Town

=== Replays ===
Tie	Home team	Score	Away team
5	Weston Super Mare	2-0	Basingstoke Town
14	Dulwich Hamlet	2-2	Grays Athletic
17	Mossley	3-1	Hyde United
18	Nuneaton Borough	1-0	King's Lynn
21	Grantham	1-0	Macclesfield Town
24	Tooting & Mitcham United	1-0	Slough Town
28	Crawley Town	1-0	Wembley
29	Southport	2-1	Whitby Town
31	Ashford Town (Kent)	1-0	Willenhall Town

=== 2nd replay ===
Tie	Home team	Score	Away team
14	Dulwich Hamlet	1-0	Grays Athletic

== 1st round ==
The teams that given byes to this round are Altrincham, Enfield, Frickley Athletic, Kidderminster Harriers, Weymouth, Runcorn, Stafford Rangers, Telford United, Kettering Town, Wealdstone, Cheltenham Town, Bath City, Boston United, Barnet, Scarborough, Northwich Victoria, Maidstone United, Dagenham, Welling United, Gateshead, Sutton United, Wycombe Wanderers, Dartford, Marine, Worthing, Bromsgrove Rovers, Bishop Auckland, Chelmsford City, Burton Albion, Yeovil Town, Bishop's Stortford and South Bank.

=== Ties ===
Tie	Home team	Score	Away team
1	Altrincham	1-0	Crook Town
2	Barking	2-2	Weymouth
3	Barnet	6-0	Wokingham Town
4	Barrow	1-1	Whitley Bay
5	Bishop Auckland	2-3	Runcorn
6	Boston United	4-3	Frickley Athletic
7	Bromsgrove Rovers	3-0	Rhyl
8	Cambridge City	3-1	Tooting & Mitcham United
9	Chelmsford City	1-2	Sutton United
10	Cheltenham Town	1-0	Dulwich Hamlet
11	Corby Town	0-0	Ashford Town (Kent)
12	Crawley Town	1-2	Bath City
13	Dagenham	2-0	Harrow Borough
14	Enfield	0-2	Aylesbury United
15	Gainsborough Trinity	1-1	South Bank
16	Grantham	1-3	Blyth Spartans
17	Hitchin Town	1-1	Boreham Wood
18	Kettering Town	2-3	Yeovil Town
19	Kidderminster Harriers	0-0	Mossley
20	Marine	2-1	Leek Town
21	Merthyr Tydfil	1-1	Dartford
22	Newcastle Blue Star	2-1	Stafford Rangers
23	Northwich Victoria	0-2	Burton Albion
24	Saltash United	0-2	Fareham Town
25	Scarborough	1-0	Morecambe
26	Southport	1-2	Gateshead
27	Telford United	1-4	Nuneaton Borough
28	Trowbridge Town	0-1	Bishop's Stortford
29	Wealdstone	1-1	Maidstone United
30	Welling United	6-0	St Albans City
31	Weston Super Mare	0-5	Worthing
32	Wycombe Wanderers	0-0	Leatherhead

=== Replays ===
Tie	Home team	Score	Away team
2	Weymouth	3-1	Barking
4	Whitley Bay	1-0	Barrow
11	Ashford Town (Kent)	1-3	Corby Town
15	South Bank	1-2	Gainsborough Trinity
17	Boreham Wood	2-4	Hitchin Town
19	Mossley	0-1	Kidderminster Harriers
21	Dartford	4-2	Merthyr Tydfil
29	Maidstone United	2-1	Wealdstone
32	Leatherhead	1-0	Wycombe Wanderers

== 2nd round ==
=== Ties ===
Tie	Home team	Score	Away team
1	Barnet	1-1	Hitchin Town
2	Bishop's Stortford	0-1	Cheltenham Town
3	Blyth Spartans	2-2	Bath City
4	Bromsgrove Rovers	3-3	Fareham Town
5	Burton Albion	3-0	Weymouth
6	Cambridge City	0-1	Boston United
7	Corby Town	3-0	Welling United
8	Dagenham	2-1	Marine
9	Kidderminster Harriers	2-0	Worthing
10	Leatherhead	0-1	Aylesbury United
11	Maidstone United	2-0	Altrincham
12	Newcastle Blue Star	1-1	Dartford
13	Nuneaton Borough	3-2	Gateshead
14	Scarborough	2-2	Sutton United
15	Whitley Bay	1-1	Gainsborough Trinity
16	Yeovil Town	0-0	Runcorn

=== Replays ===
Tie	Home team	Score	Away team
1	Hitchin Town	0-5	Barnet
3	Bath City	0-1	Blyth Spartans
4	Fareham Town	1-0	Bromsgrove Rovers
12	Dartford	5-1	Newcastle Blue Star
14	Sutton United	0-2	Scarborough
15	Gainsborough Trinity	1-1	Whitley Bay
16	Runcorn	2-1	Yeovil Town

=== 2nd replay ===
Tie	Home team	Score	Away team
15	Whitley Bay	3-1	Gainsborough Trinity

== 3rd round ==
=== Ties ===
Tie	Home team	Score	Away team
1	Barnet	1-1	Boston United
2	Burton Albion	1-0	Whitley Bay
3	Cheltenham Town	2-3	Kidderminster Harriers
4	Corby Town	0-3	Maidstone United
5	Dagenham	0-0	Aylesbury United
6	Nuneaton Borough	2-2	Blyth Spartans
7	Runcorn	1-1	Dartford
8	Scarborough	0-2	Fareham Town

=== Replays ===
Tie	Home team	Score	Away team
1	Boston United	3-3	Barnet
5	Aylesbury United	1-2	Dagenham
6	Blyth Spartans	2-2	Nuneaton Borough
7	Dartford	2-1	Runcorn

=== 2nd replays ===
Tie	Home team	Score	Away team
1	Barnet	3-0	Boston United
6	Nuneaton Borough	2-2	Blyth Spartans

=== 3rd replay ===
Tie	Home team	Score	Away team
6	Blyth Spartans	0-1	Nuneaton Borough

== 4th round ==
=== Ties ===
Tie	Home team	Score	Away team
1	Barnet	0-1	Fareham Town
2	Dagenham	1-3	Kidderminster Harriers
3	Maidstone United	1-1	Burton Albion
4	Nuneaton Borough	1-3	Dartford

=== Replays ===
Tie	Home team	Score	Away team
3	Burton Albion	1-0	Maidstone United

== Semi finals ==
=== First leg ===
Tie	Home team	Score	Away team
1	Burton Albion	2-1	Dartford
2	Kidderminster Harriers	0-0	Fareham Town

=== Second leg ===
Tie	Home team	Score	Away team	Aggregate
1	Dartford	0-2	Burton Albion	1-4
2	Fareham Town	0-2	Kidderminster Harriers	0-2

== Final ==
=== Tie ===
Home team	Score	Away team
Kidderminster Harriers	0-0	Burton Albion

=== Replay ===
Home team	Score	Away team
Kidderminster Harriers	2-1	Burton Albion
