= William Piers (bishop) =

English bishop (1580–1670)

- Bishop of Bath and Wells
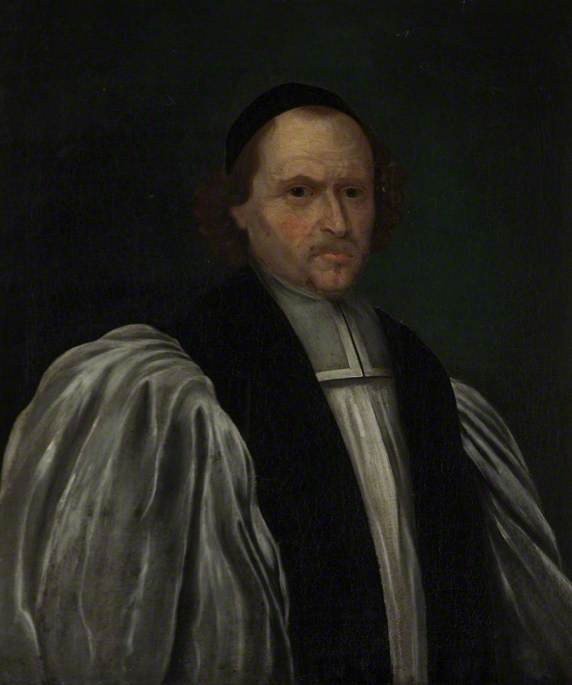
- Oil painting of Pier as bishop
- Diocese: Diocese of Bath and Wells
- In office: 1632–1646 (depr.); 1660–1670 (d.)
- Predecessor: Walter Curle
- Successor: Robert Creighton
- Other posts: Vice-Chancellor of Oxford University (1621–1624); Dean of Peterborough (1622–1630); Bishop of Peterborough (1630–1632)

Orders
- Consecration: 1630

Personal details
- Born: c. 1580 South Hinksey, Berkshire, England
- Died: 1670 Walthamstow, Essex, England
- Buried: Walthamstow Parish Church
- Denomination: Anglican
- Children: William Piers, Archdeacon of Bath
- Education: Christ Church, Oxford

William Piers (Pierse, Pierce; c. 1580 – 1670) was Vice-Chancellor of Oxford University from 1621 to 1624, Bishop of Peterborough from 1630 to 1632 and Bishop of Bath and Wells from 1632 until the abolition of episcopacy in 1646, then again from the Restoration in 1660 to his death in 1670.

== Life ==
The son of William Piers or Pierse, was born at South Hinksey, Oxford, and baptised in the parish church of All Saints on 3 September 1580. His father was a nephew or near relative of John Piers, Archbishop of York. He matriculated at Christ Church, Oxford 17 August 1599, and became student the same year. He graduated B.A. in 1600, M.A. in 1603, B.D. 1610, D.D. 1614. In 1609 he was presented by James I to the rectory of Grafton Regis, Northamptonshire, which he resigned in 1611 on his collation by John King, Bishop of London as Vicar of Northolt, which he held till 1632.

He was appointed chaplain to Bishop King in 1612, and was strongly influenced by King, who himself had been chaplain to Archbishop Piers. At Oxford he followed Arminianism and high church doctrine in William Laud's circle. He was licensed to preach, became a prebendary of St Paul's, and a reader in Divinity.

In 1615 he added to his other preferments the rectory of St. Christopher-le-Stocks in the city of London, which he held till 1620. In January 1616 he was presented to the fifth stall as a Canon of Christ Church Cathedral, which he exchanged for the eighth stall 16 December 1618, holding it in commendam till 1632. In 1618 he received from his patron, Bishop King, the prebendal stall of Wildland in St. Paul's Cathedral, holding with it the office of divinity reader. As canon of Christ Church he resided chiefly at Oxford, and, though not the head of a house, served the office of vice-chancellor in 1621–4. As vice-chancellor he used his authority to oppose the Calvinist party in the university, and he secured a D.D. degree for the royalist Robert Sibthorpe. He encouraged the Doctrine of Grace, which rejected predestination and moved towards a more universal truth and divine forgiveness. However, in his early career he still held onto Calvinism.

It was the last of these Calvinist political Bishops John Williams of Lincoln, a former Lord Keeper, who appointed Piers to the deanery of Peterborough 9 June 1622. He was elevated in 1630 to the bishopric of Peterborough, being consecrated on 24 October. He obtained letters of dispensation to hold the rectory of Northolt and the canonry of Christ Church together with his bishopric in commendam; Northolt he soon resigned, taking the chapter living of Caistor, 27 February 1632. In October 1632 he was translated from Peterborough to Bath and Wells, with William Laud's backing. He enforced the orthodox ceremonies, and in 1633 issued orders for the positioning and railing of the communion table, being obeyed in 140 churches of the diocese, but resisted by the majority.

The churchwardens of Beckington refused to carry out the change, and were excommunicated for their contumacy. Backed up by leading puritan laity in the clothier districts, they appealed to the court of arches, but in vain. A petition sent by parishioners to Laud was disregarded. The churchwarden then appealed to the king, but could get no answer. They were then imprisoned in the county gaol, where they remained for a year, being released in 1637 only on condition of submission and public acknowledgement of their offence. Later Laud, when in the Tower of London in 1642, accepted the whole responsibility.

Piers also offended strict Sunday Sabbatarians; the judges of assize had forbidden unlawful Sunday meetings, and ordered that the prohibition should be read by the ministers in the parish church. These orders were reissued in 1632 by Justice Richardson, which Piers opposed the following year using the only available precedent St Gregory's Case. Laud, finding this interference with episcopal jurisdiction, wrote to Piers to obtain the opinion of some of the clergy of his diocese as to how the wakes were conducted. However, by 1636, only 140 of 469 in the Canterbury Province had complied with the ruling. In Somerset Fry and Wheeler, churchwardens refused to move and rail the altar. Laud excommunicated them, which deepened resentment against Arminianism.

Piers's reply to Laud upheld the old custom of wakes and church ales or parish ales, basing the outcry against them on Sabbatarianism. He collected seventy-two signatures from clerics who supported wakes and church recreation. Opponents were accused of forming illegal puritan conventicles and alehouses. He proceeded to enforce the reading of the Declaration or Book of Sports in church, visiting the clergy who refused with censure and suspension, but earning widespread antipathy in many parishes of his see. Evidence however shows Piers also hunted recusants. Many lived in Somerset, but few were prosecuted. Piers also followed Laud's reforms of Wadham College, Oxford, founded by a Somerset squire, in his efforts of 1633 and 1637. Piers was a dedicated bishop, keeping meticulous accounts. He sued the previous bishop Walter Curll for allowing Wells Cathedral to fall into disrepair; although John Cosin called Piers to account for his time at Peterborough.

Piers was an equally determined enemy to the 'lectureships'. Secularizing preachers gave a ministry for free; but they lacked uniformity. Piers further ordered that catechising should take the place of lectures, and according to William Prynne, he boasted that, 'thank God, he had not one lecture left in his diocese'. Piers argued that Feast Days, much to puritan anger, were good for the people to enjoy at Thanksgiving and Christmas. According to Raleigh a new type of precisian puritan objected feasts on the Sabbath. Historian Jonathan Barry has demonstrated that ritualism in Somerset linked some clergy and women in outdoor ceremonies to alleged witchcraft; ministers of ejected livings dabbling with Shamanism.

The Personal Rule's policies made Piers very unpopular. Ship Money In 1635 collected inland became bitterly resented in puritan villages of North Somerset. In 1636 he decided to appoint his son William Piers as Rector of Buckland St Mary. An argument ensued with puritan noble Sir Francis Popham who owned the advowson, and did not want a high church cleric in his parish.

On Laud's fall a petition was presented to the House of Commons against Piers. Within a few days of the committal of Laud to the Tower on 18 December 1640. Piers, together with Bishop Matthew Wren, was impeached before the House of Lords, and bound to appear at the bar on 30 December. The 'Articles of Association, 8' (printed in 1642), in fifteen heads, closed with a denunciation of Piers. A committee was appointed to investigate the charges; its scope was widened to embrace the clergy generally. Piers was one of the twelve bishops who signed the protest against the legality of parliamentary proceedings in their enforced absence, for which they were accused of high treason and committed to the Tower in December 1641.

At the beginning of their imprisonment he preached to his brother prelates two sermons on 2 Cor. xii. 8–9, which were later published. Having been liberated on bail by the Lords, he and the other were again imprisoned by the Commons. He was deprived of his See by Parliament on 9 October 1646, as episcopacy was abolished for the duration of the Commonwealth and the Protectorate.

During the period to 1660 he was deprived of his status, but recovered his liberty, and lived on an estate of his own in the parish of Cuddesdon in Oxfordshire, where he married a second time. In 1660 he was restored to his bishopric. At the end of his life he left Wells and lived mainly at Walthamstow in Essex. Here he died in April 1670, in his ninetieth year, and was buried in the parish church. He left two sons by his first wife: William DD, later appointed by his father to be Archdeacon of Bath, and John, a lay prebendary of Wells, who inherited the family estate at Cuddesdon.

Church of England titles
Preceded by Henry Beaumont	Dean of Peterborough; 1622–1630	Succeeded by John Towers
Preceded by Thomas Dove	Bishop of Peterborough; 1630–1632	Succeeded by Augustine Lindsell
Preceded by Walter Curle	Bishop of Bath and Wells; 1632–1646 & 1660–1670	Succeeded by Robert Creighton
