= Jack Chambers =

Jack Chambers may refer to:

- Jack Chambers (linguist) (1938–2026), Canadian linguist
- Jack Chambers (artist) (1931–1978), Canadian artist and filmmaker
- Jack Chambers (footballer) (1901–1983), Australian rules footballer
- Jack Chambers (politician) (born 1990), Irish Fianna Fáil politician

== See also ==
- Jack Chambers Public School, an elementary school in London, Ontario
- John Chambers (disambiguation)
- Chambers (surname)
