= Thomas Dove =

British bishop

The Right Reverend Thomas Dove
- Bishop of Peterborough
- Diocese: Diocese of Peterborough
- In office: 1601–1630
- Predecessor: Richard Howland
- Successor: William Piers
- Other post: Dean of Norwich (1589–1601)

Personal details
- Born: 1555 London
- Died: 30 August 1630
- Buried: Peterborough Cathedral
- Denomination: Anglican
- Parents: William Dove
- Children: Sir William Dove of Upton
- Education: Merchant Taylors' School; Pembroke College, Cambridge

Thomas Dove (1555 – 30 August 1630) was Bishop of Peterborough from 1601 to 1630.

Dove was born in London, England, and educated at Merchant Taylors' School from 1564 to 1571. He was named as one of the first scholars of Jesus College, Oxford in its foundation charter in 1571, but never attended. Instead, he became a scholar at Pembroke College, Cambridge, obtaining his BA in 1575 and his MA in 1578. He was a Pembroke contemporary of Lancelot Andrewes, who had also been educated at Merchant Taylors' School and named as a founding scholar of Jesus College, Oxford. Dove was ordained in 1578 and became vicar of Saffron Walden, Essex in 1580. Dove was a noted preacher, impressing Queen Elizabeth who remarked that she "thought the Holy Ghost was descended again in this Dove".

In 1589, Dove became Dean of Norwich and in 1601 he was consecrated Bishop of Peterborough, where he remained until his death in 1630.

Church of England titles
| Preceded by George Gardiner | Dean of Norwich; 1589–1601 | Succeeded by John Jegon |
| Preceded by Richard Howland | Bishop of Peterborough; 1601–1630 | Succeeded by William Piers |
