= Woodcock Street Baths =

Swimming pool in Birmingham, England

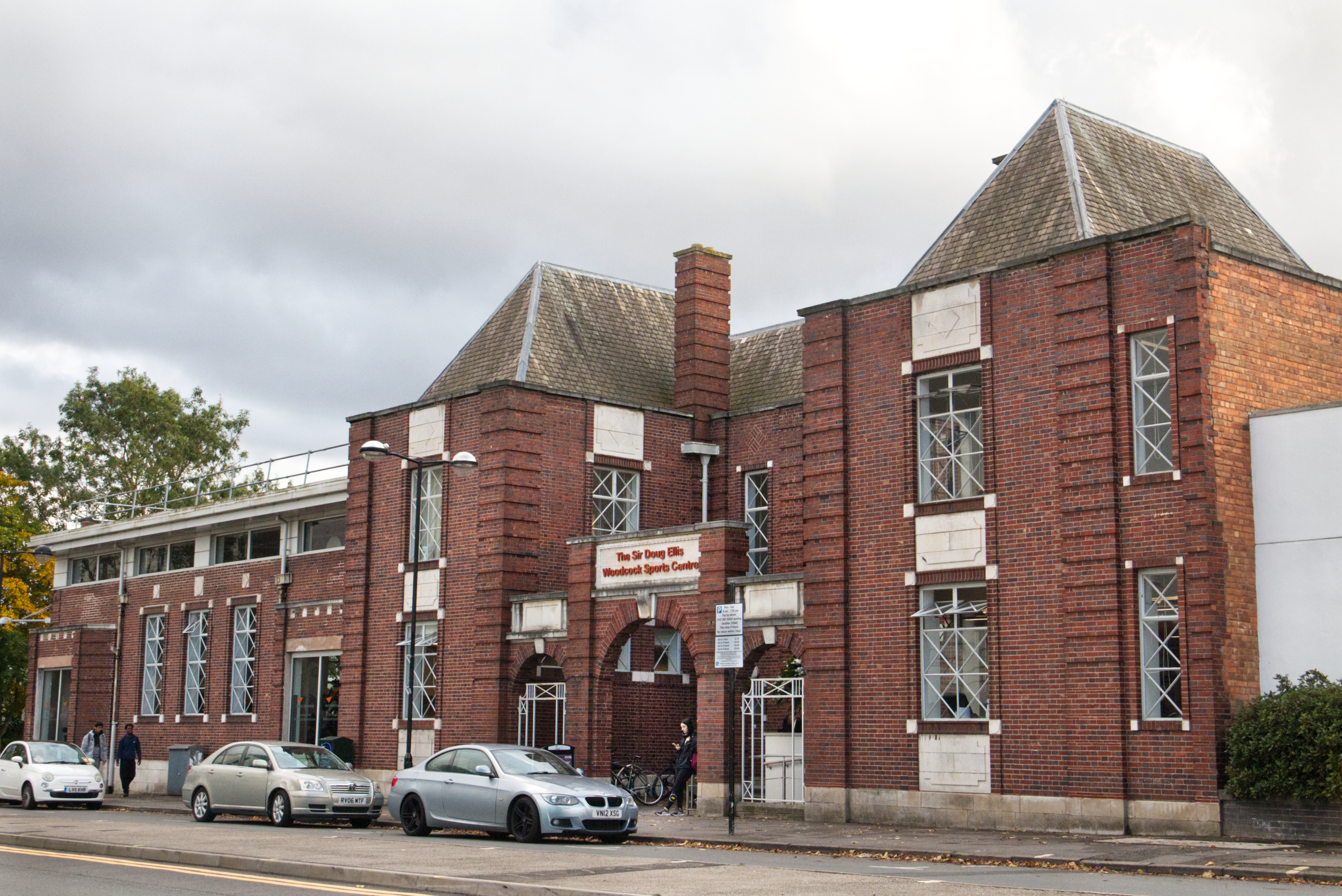

General information
- Status: Grade II listed
- Architectural style: Edwardian
- Location: Birmingham grid reference SP 078 876
- Country: United Kingdom
- Coordinates: 52°29′9.1″N 1°53′12.5″W
- Completed: 1902

Website
- www2.aston.ac.uk/sport/gym-and-swimming/swimming

Woodcock Street Baths is a swimming pool, part of the Sir Doug Ellis Woodcock Sports Centre in Birmingham, England. The pool dates from 1902. It was originally a public baths; it is now part of Aston University and is operated by Sport Aston. It is a Grade II listed building.

The pool is open to students and staff of the university, and to the public.

== History ==
It is one of the oldest operating pools in Britain.

Woodcock Street Baths was originally opened in 1860. It was Birmingham's second public baths after the passage of the 1846 Public Baths and Wash-houses Act. In 1902 an additional pool, the First Class Pool, was built. In the 1920s the baths were reconstructed; the 1902 pool was a part that remained from the earlier building.

It was taken over by Aston University in 1980. There was further redevelopment in 2011, and in 2013 the sports centre was named after Sir Doug Ellis.

=== Architecture ===
The pool retains most of the original features. The long rectangular hall has white tiled walls with blue and brown banding; along the sides are cubicles with terracotta arches. The roof is supported by elliptic girders that are pierced with quatrefoil shapes.
