= Lewis Clayton =

Anglican bishop (1838–1917)

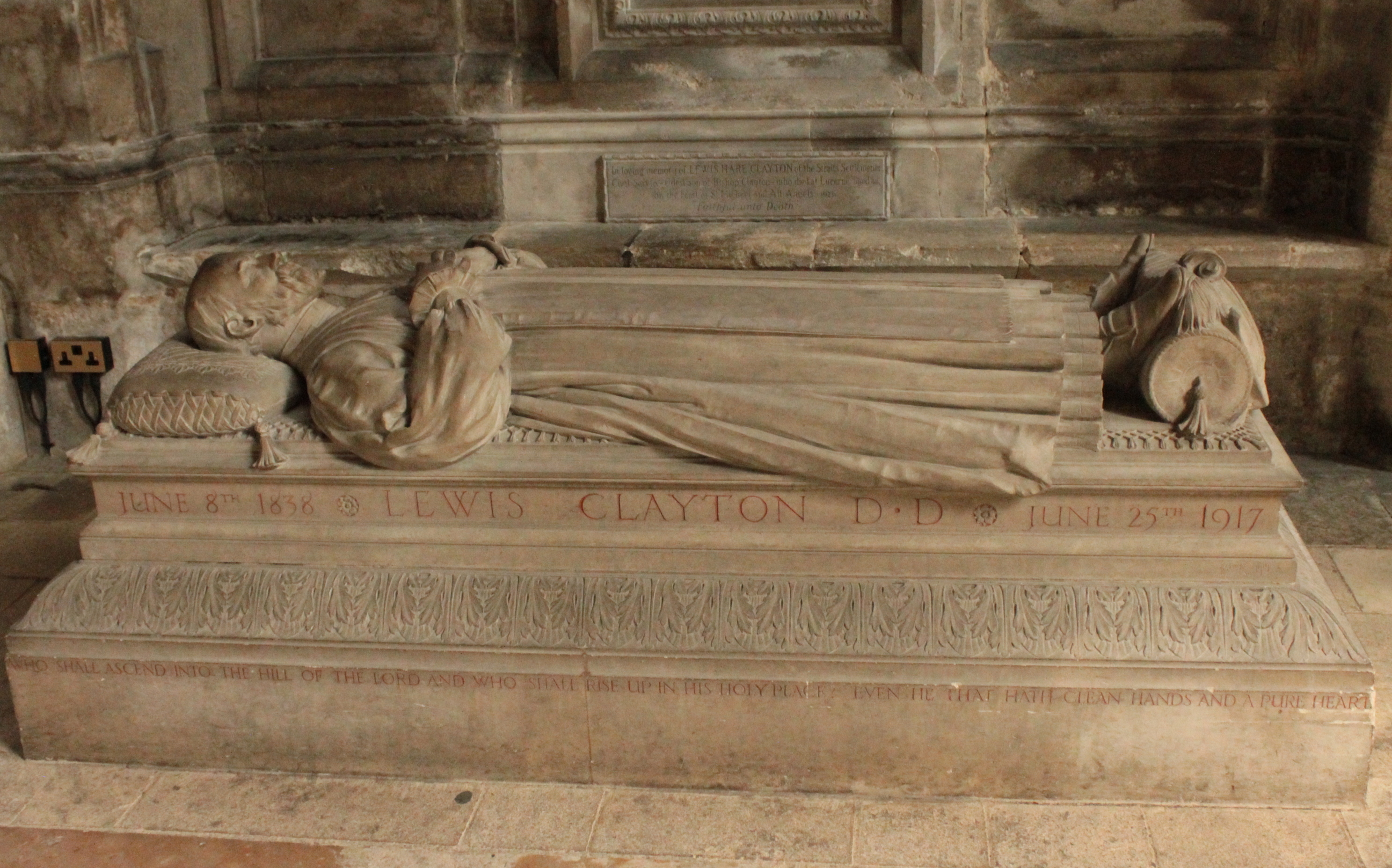
The grave of Lewis Clayton, Peterborough Cathedral

Lewis Clayton (8 June 1838 – 25 June 1917) was an Anglican bishop, the second bishop suffragan of Leicester from 1903 until 1912.

== Life ==
Clayton was born in London in 1838, the son of John Clayton, a solicitor He was educated at King's College School and Emmanuel College, Cambridge, where he graduated in 1860. He was ordained deacon in 1861 and priest in 1862, his first post was as a curate at Holy Trinity, Halstead. From 1864 to 1866 he curate in Hanbury, Worcestershire, and from 1866 to 1872 at St James End, Northampton. In 1873 he was nominated as Vicar of Dallington, Northamptonshire and from 1875 to 1888 he was vicar of St Margaret's Church, the main church in Leicester. While in Leicester he also spent four years as rural dean in the area.

From 1887 he was a residentiary canon at Peterborough Cathedral, and he was proctor in convocation from 1892.

Clayton was appointed suffragan bishop of Leicester in January 1903, and consecrated Bishop (by the Archbishop of Canterbury) at Westminster Abbey on 24 February 1903. He resigned the see (retaining his cathedral residential canonry) and became an assistant bishop of Peterborough (in retirement) in December 1912, serving as such until his death in 1917.

He died on 25 June 1917. He is buried at the east end of the cathedral.

His wife Katharine Hare (1843–1933), daughter of Thomas Hare, was a sister of the writer Marian Andrews (Christopher Hare), and a prominent campaigner for women's suffrage.

Church of England titles
Preceded by Francis Thicknesse	Bishop of Leicester; 1903–1912	Succeeded by Norman Lang
