= John Towers (bishop) =

English churchman

John Towers (died 1649) was an English churchman, Bishop of Peterborough from 1639, a royalist and a supporter of the ecclesiastical policies of William Laud.

== Life ==
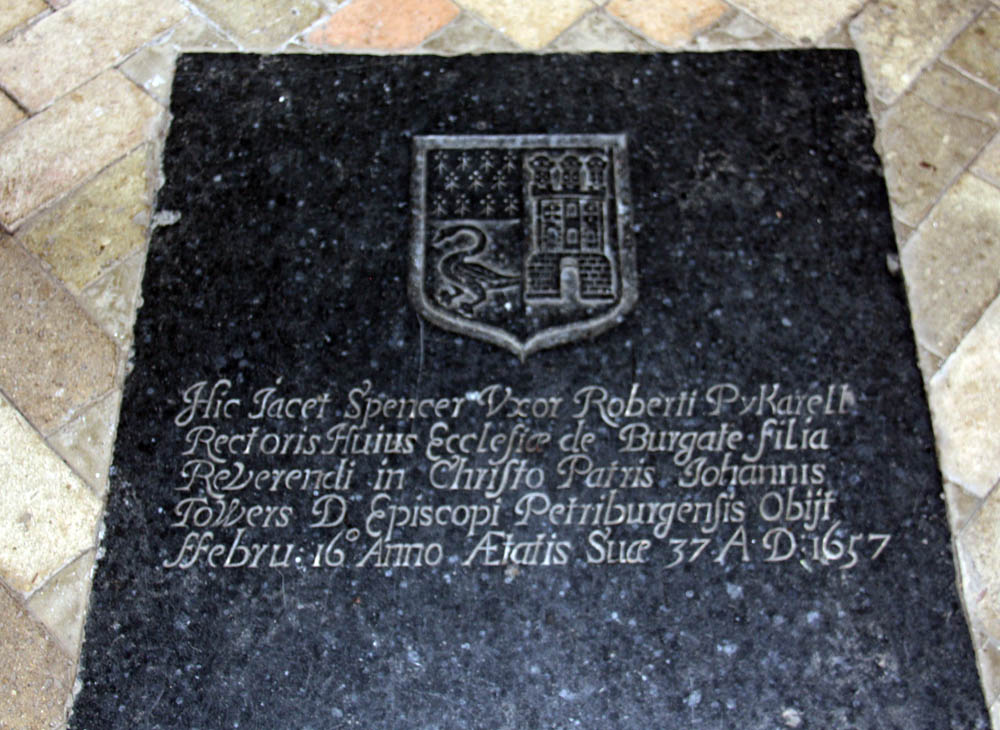
St Mary's Church, Burgate, Suffolk, ledger stone of Spencer Towers (1620-1657) wife of Rev. Robert Pykarell, Rector of Burgate, and a daughter of John Towers, Bishop of Peterborough. Arms: Pykarell (A swan a chief ermine) impaling Towers (A tower triple-towered)

John was born in Norfolk, son of Thomas Towers, a wealthy fishmonger of Yarmouth (d.1589), and his wife Margaret. He matriculated as a sizar of King's College, Cambridge around 1595, entered Queens' College, Cambridge as a scholar in 1598, graduating Bachelor of Arts (BA) in 1602 and Cambridge Master of Arts (MA Cantab) in 1606. On 15 March 1607-8 he was elected a fellow, and on 9 July 1611 he was incorporated at Oxford. He graduated Bachelor of Divinity (BD) in 1615, and obtained that of Doctor of Divinity (DD) per regias literas on 13 December 1624. Previously he was appointed chaplain to William Compton, 1st Earl of Northampton, and by him was presented to the rectory of Castle Ashby, Northamptonshire, on 11 April 1617. On 11 October 1623 he was instituted rector of Yardley-Hastings in the same county, and on 4 July 1628, being at the time of the king's chaplains, he was presented to the vicarage of Halifax in Yorkshire.

On 14 November 1630 he was instituted Dean of Peterborough, and on 3 April 1634 was installed a prebendary of Westminster. He was an ardent supporter of the royal prerogative, and on 11 September 1637 wrote requesting that the collection of ship-money in Peterborough might be entrusted to him instead of the sheriff. On 1 October 1638 he was instituted rector of Castor, Northamptonshire, and on 8 March 1639 he was enthroned bishop of Peterborough, after much lobbying.

In his episcopal office Towers supported William Laud in his changes in ritual. On 4 August 1641 he was included in the list of thirteen bishops formally impeached by the House of Commons on account of their co-operation with Laud in enactment of illegal canons in convocation, in consequence of which they were prevented from voting while their cause was pending. On 28 December in company with John Williams, archbishop of York, and ten other bishops, of whom nine were among those impeached, Towers signed the well-known protest declaring the actions of parliament in their absence null and void. On John Pym's motion, those who had signed were impeached as guilty of high treason for subversion of the fundamental laws of the kingdom and the very being of parliament, and on the last day of the year Towers and nine others were lodged in the Tower of London. After about four months he was released, retired to Peterborough, and then to Oxford, where he remained till its surrender in 1646. He was deprived of his See by Parliament on 9 October 1646, as episcopacy was abolished for the duration of the Commonwealth and the Protectorate.

He then returned to Peterborough, where he died in obscurity on 10 January 1649. He was buried in the cathedral. By his wife Mary (d. 14 November 1672), he had a daughter Spencer, who married Robert Pykarell, rector of Burgate in Suffolk, and died on 16 February 1657 aged 37, and another daughter Catherine, who married Oliver Pocklington, rector of Brington, and died in 1689, and a son William Towers.

John Towers' wife was Mary Foskett daughter of Thomas Foskett of Olney (d.1633). In 1633, Thomas Foskett mentions the seven children of his daughter Mary Towers as beneficiaries in his Will, including her son Thomas Towers.

Towers was the author of Four Sermons, London, 1660, edited by his son.

== Notes ==
Church of England titles
Preceded by Francis Dee	Bishop of Peterborough; 1639–1646	Succeeded by abolished until 1660; Benjamin Laney
