= Bishop of Peterborough =

Diocesan bishop in the Church of England

- Bishopric

anglican
- Arms of the Bishop of Peterborough: Gules, two keys in saltire addorsed the wards upwards between four cross-crosslets fitchée or
- Incumbent: Debbie Sellin

Location
- Ecclesiastical province: Canterbury
- Residence: Bishop's Lodging, The Palace, Peterborough

Information
- First holder: John Chambers
- Established: 1541
- Diocese: Peterborough
- Cathedral: Cathedral Church of St Peter, St Paul and St Andrew, Peterborough

The Bishop of Peterborough is the ordinary of the Church of England Diocese of Peterborough in the Province of Canterbury.

The diocese covers the counties of Northamptonshire (including the Soke of Peterborough) and Rutland. The see is in the City of Peterborough, where the bishop's seat (cathedra) is located at the Cathedral Church of Saint Peter, Saint Paul and Saint Andrew. The bishop's residence is Bishop's Lodging, The Palace, Peterborough. The office has been in existence since the foundation of the diocese on 4 September 1541 under King Henry VIII.

The current Bishop of Peterborough is Debbie Sellin, since the confirmation, on 13 December 2023 at Lambeth Palace Chapel, of her election.

As parts of the City of Peterborough are actually in the Diocese of Ely (those parishes south of the River Nene), the last Bishop of Peterborough was appointed as an assistant bishop in the Diocese of Ely with pastoral care for these parishes delegated to him by the Bishop of Ely.

== List of bishops ==
Chronological list of the Bishops of Peterborough:

Bishops of Peterborough
From	Until	Incumbent	Notes
1541	1556	John Chambers	Last Abbot of Peterborough Abbey. Died in office
1557	1559	David Pole	Deposed
1560	1585	Edmund Scambler	Translated to Norwich
1585	1600	Richard Howland	Died in office
1601	1630	Thomas Dove	Died in office
1630	1632	William Piers	Translated to Bath & Wells
1633	1634	Augustine Lindsell	Translated to Hereford
1634	1638	Francis Dee	Died in office
1639	1646	John Towers	Deprived of the see when the English episcopacy was abolished by Parliament on 9 October 1646; died 1649.
1646	1660	The see was abolished during the Commonwealth and the Protectorate.	
1660	1663	Benjamin Lany	Translated to Lincoln
1663	1679	Joseph Henshaw	Died in office
1679	1685	William Lloyd	Translated from Llandaff; translated to Norwich
1685	1690	Thomas White	Deprived of office
1691	1718	Richard Cumberland	Died in office
1718	1728	White Kennett	Died in office
1729	1747	Robert Clavering	Translated from Llandaff; died in office
1747	1757	John Thomas	Translated to Salisbury
1757	1764	Richard Terrick	Translated to London
1764	1769	Robert Lamb	Died in office
1769	1794	John Hinchliffe	Died in office
1794	1813	Spencer Madan	Translated from Bristol; died in office
1813	1819	John Parsons	Died in office
1819	1839	Herbert Marsh	Translated from Llandaff; died in office
1839	1864	George Davys	Died in office
1864	1868	Francis Jeune	Died in office
1868	1891	William Connor Magee	Translated to York
1891	1897	Mandell Creighton	Translated to London
1897	1916	Edward Carr Glyn	John Mitchinson, assistant bishop once acted diocesan bishop during Carr-Glyn's illness.
1916	1923	Theodore Woods	Translated to Winchester
1924	1927	Cyril Bardsley	Translated to Leicester
1927	1949	Claude Blagden	
1949	1956	Spencer Leeson	Died in office
1956	1961	Robert Stopford	Previously Bishop of Fulham; translated to London
1961	1972	Cyril Easthaugh	Previously Bishop of Kensington
1972	1984	Douglas Feaver	
1984	1995	Bill Westwood	Previously suffragan Bishop of Edmonton (London)
1996	2009	Ian Cundy	Died in office
2010	2023	Donald Allister	Previously Archdeacon of Chester.
2023	2023	John Holbrook (acting)	Bishop of Brixworth.
2023	present	Debbie Sellin	Translated from Southampton, 13 December 2023.

== Assistant bishops ==
Among those called "Assistant Bishop of Peterborough" were:

- August 1881 – November 1900: John Mitchinson (Rector of Sibstone then Master of Pembroke College, Oxford)
- 1912–1917 (d.): Lewis Clayton, Canon residentiary of Peterborough Cathedral and former Bishop suffragan of Leicester
- 1926 – 1945 (ret.): Norman Lang, Canon residentiary of Peterborough Cathedral; Archdeacon of Northampton (until 1936), of Oakham (thereafter); and former Bishop suffragan of Leicester (resigned his suffragan See due to the erection of the Diocese of Leicester, but continued in essentially the same role)
- 1950 – 1963: Charles Aylen, Vicar of Flore (1945–58) and non-residentiary Canon of Peterborough (1946–61); former Bishop of St Helena
- 1952–1957 (res.): Gerald Vernon, Vicar of Finedon and former Bishop of Madagascar
- 1957–1969 (d.): Weston Stewart, Rector of Cottesmore, Rutland until 1964 and former Bishop in Jerusalem
- 1978 – 1986 (ret.): William Franklin. former Bishop of Colombia

Honorary assistant bishops — retired bishops taking on occasional duties voluntarily — have included:

- 1974–1978 (d.): Guy Marshall, Vicar of Blakesley with Adstone, former suffragan Bishop in Venezuela (Diocese of Trinidad and Tobago)
- 1975–1984 (res.): Alan Rogers, retired Bishop of Fulham and of Edmonton
- 1981–1985 Paul Burrough, Rector of Empingham, Rutland and retired Bishop of Mashonaland.

== See also ==
- List of abbots of Peterborough
- Dean of Peterborough
