= Ephraim Pagit =

English clergyman and heresiographer

Ephraim Pagit (Pagitt) (c. 1575 – April 1647) was an English clergyman and heresiographer.

His 1645 book Heresiography was a precursor of the better-known Gangraena (published the following year by Thomas Edwards). It is an account of contemporary sectarian Protestantism in England. The Oxford English Dictionary indicates that the title of this book was a neologism, derived by analogy from Christianography, an earlier title, to indicate a catalogue or classification of heretics. By political conviction, Pagit was a royalist, but he was sufficiently opposed to the religious Independents to support Presbyterianism.

== Life ==
The son of Eusebius Pagit, he was born in Northamptonshire in 1575. He matriculated at Christ Church, Oxford on 25 May 1593, being eighteen years old. There is no evidence of his graduation, but he is said to have been a great linguist, writing in fifteen or sixteen languages. On 19 August 1601, he was admitted to the rectory of St. Edmund the King, Lombard Street.

In May 1638, he wrote a series of letters addressed to Cyril Lucaris, Patriarch of Constantinople, and other patriarchs of the Greek Orthodox church. In them he commended to their notice his own Christianographie, the translation of the English prayer-book into Greek by Elias Petley, and William Laud's conference with John Fisher.

On the outbreak of the First English Civil War, Paget was silenced and retired to Deptford, Kent. He was always a strong royalist and in favour of the prayer-book; but he took the Covenant. In 1645 he joined in a petition to Parliament for the establishment of presbyterianism. His standard of doctrine he found in the articles of the Church of England. He died at Deptford in April 1647 and was buried in the churchyard.

== Family ==
He married Lady Boyd, the widow of Sir Stephen Bord of Sussex.

== Works ==
He published:

- Christianographie; or, a Description of the sundrie Sorts of Christians in the World, &c, 1635, (many reprints);
- Heresiography; or a description of the Hereticks and Sectaries of these latter times, &c, 1645; sixth edition, 1662.
- The Mystical Wolf, &c., 1645, (sermon on Matthew vii. 15 : reissued with new title-page, The Tryall of Trueth, &c.)

His nine letters to the patriarchs of Constantinople, Alexandria, Antioch, Jerusalem, Moscow, and of the Maronites, also to Prince Radziwil of Poland and John Tolnai of Transylvania, are in Harleian MS. 825. All are duplicated in Greek and Latin; two are also in English, and one in Syriac.
