= William Piers (priest) =

English Anglican priest

William Piers, D.D. was an English Anglican priest in the 17th century.

The son of Bishop William Piers, Vice-Chancellor of Oxford University from 1621 to 1624, he was educated at Christ Church, Oxford. He held livings at Kingsbury Episcopi, Buckland St Mary, Cudworth, East Brent and Christian Malford. Piers was archdeacon of Bath from 1638 to 1443Horn, Joyce M. (1979), Fasti Ecclesiae Anglicanae 1541–1857, vol. 5, pp. 18–20 and Archdeacon of Taunton from 1643 until his death 4 April 1682. He was also a canon residentiary at Wells Cathedral from 1639.
