= Bishop of Leicester (suffragan) =

Anglican suffragan bishop in England

The Bishop of Leicester was a suffragan bishop of the Church of England Diocese of Peterborough in the Province of Canterbury.

A thousand years after it had last been used (for a diocesan Mercian bishop, 679–888) the episcopal title was resurrected as a suffragan see within the diocese of Peterborough. The suffragan Bishop of Leicester assisted the diocesan Bishop of Peterborough in overseeing the diocese.

In the modern Diocese of Leicester, there was a stipendiary (paid) Assistant Bishop of Leicester (1987–2017), until a new suffragan See of Loughborough was erected to replace the Assistant Bishop role — see Bishop of Loughborough.

== List of bishops ==
Bishops suffragan of Leicester
From	Until	Incumbent	Notes
1888	1903	Francis Thicknesse	Formerly Archdeacon of Northampton
1903	1912	Lewis Clayton	Canon of Peterborough; became Assistant Bishop of Peterborough
1913	1927	Norman Lang	Resigned the See, but effectively continued in post as an assistant bishop.
In 1927, the suffragan see of Leicester ended with the creation of the diocesan see.
