= John Chambers (footballer) =

English footballer (born 1949)

Personal information
- Date of birth: 7 October 1949 (age 77)
- Place of birth: Birmingham, England
- Position: Midfielder

Senior career*
| Years | Team | Apps | (Gls) |
| 1968–1969 | Aston Villa | 2 | (0) |
| 1969–1970 | Southend United | 7 | (0) |
- Bromsgrove Rovers
| Total | | 9 | (0) |

Managerial career
- 1979–1983: Kidderminster Harriers
- 1984–????: Alvechurch
- * Club domestic league appearances and goals

John Chambers (born 7 October 1949) is an English former footballer who played in the Football League for Aston Villa and Southend United. He managed Kidderminster Harriers from 1979 to 1983, and became player-manager of Alvechurch in 1984.
