= Augustine Lindsell =

English classical scholar and bishop

The Right Reverend Augustine Lindsell
- Bishop of Hereford
- Church: Church of England
- Diocese: Diocese of Hereford
- In office: 1634
- Predecessor: William Juxon
- Successor: Matthew Wren
- Other post: Bishop of Peterborough (1633–1634)

Orders
- Consecration: 1633

Personal details
- Born: c. 1575 Bumstead-Steeple, Essex, England
- Died: 6 November 1634 (aged 58–59)
- Denomination: Church of England (Anglican)
- Spouse: unmarried
- Education: Clare Hall (now Clare College, Cambridge)

Augustine Lindsell (died 6 November 1634) was an English classical scholar and Bishop of Hereford. In church matters he was advanced by Richard Neile, and was a firm supporter of William Laud. As a scholar he influenced Thomas Farnaby.

== Life ==
He was born at Bumstead-Steeple, Essex. On 4 April 1592, he was admitted pensioner of Emmanuel College, Cambridge, but was subsequently scholar and fellow of Clare Hall (now Clare College, Cambridge). He graduated Bachelor of Arts (BA) in 1595/6, Cambridge Master of Arts (MA Cantab) in 1599, and Doctor of Divinity (DD) in 1621. At Clare, he was tutor to Nicholas Ferrar.

In March 1610, he became rector of Wickford, Essex. Neile, Bishop of Durham, appointed him his chaplain. He was an unsuccessful candidate for the Regius Professorship of Greek (at Cambridge), when it was vacant after the resignation of Andrew Downes in 1627. He and Patrick Young were the two scholars given special access to the Barozzi manuscripts, and Lindsell worked on the cataloguing of the collection.

He was installed as Dean of Lichfield on 15 October 1628. He was responsible for introducing Christopher Davenport, the Catholic eirenicist, to Laud. With John Cosin and Francis Burgoyne, he was accused in 1630 of not maintaining that the Pope was the Antichrist. This small group at Durham was strongly opposed by Peter Smart, and he accused them of, in effect, wanting to turn back the Reformation.

On 10 February 1633, he was consecrated a bishop, becoming Bishop of Peterborough, and in March 1634 was translated to Hereford. He died unmarried on 6 November 1634, and was buried in Hereford Cathedral. To Clare Hall Library he bequeathed all his Greek manuscripts and some Greek books; to Robert Cotton he left a manuscript history of Ely Cathedral in Latin.

== Works ==
His edition of Theophylact's Commentaries on St. Paul's Epistles was published by T. Baily, his coadjutor in the work (fol. London, 1636). It is dedicated to Laud.

== Sources ==
- This article incorporates text from a publication now in the public domain: "Lindsell, Augustine". Dictionary of National Biography. London: Smith, Elder & Co. 1885–1900.

Church of England titles
Preceded by William Piers	Bishop of Peterborough; 1633–1634	Succeeded by Francis Dee
Preceded by William Juxon	Bishop of Hereford; 24 March – 6 November 1634	Succeeded by Matthew Wren
