= Faculty (canon law) =

A faculty is a legal instrument or warrant in canon law, usually an authorisation to do something.

== Catholic Church ==
In the canon law of the Catholic Church, a faculty is "the authority, privilege, or permission, to perform an act or function. In a broad sense, a faculty is a certain power, whether based on one's own right, or received as a favour from another, of validly or lawfully doing some action".

== Church of England ==
In the Church of England (whose canons have the status of national law) the "faculty jurisdiction" is set out in the Care of Churches and Ecclesiastical Jurisdiction Measure 1991, and the Faculty Jurisdiction Rules 2015. A faculty is the required permission to carry out works on the church and its curtilage; in most cases this is required instead of planning permission, although both are required for major external work. The parish has to prepare a petition for the faculty and the chancellor of the diocese may grant the faculty after due consideration. Where the work is listed on Schedule 1 List A, no faculty is required and where it is on List B the faculty may be granted by the archdeacon rather than the chancellor.
