= Norman Lang (bishop) =

Bishop suffragan of Leicester, 1913–1927

Norman MacLeod Lang (1875–1956) was the third Bishop suffragan of Leicester from 1913 until 1927.

Lang's father, John Marshall Lang, was a Church of Scotland minister and some-time Moderator; among Norman's brothers were Cosmo, Archbishop of York and then of Canterbury; and Marshall, minister and some-time Moderator. He was educated at Christ Church, Oxford, and after a period of study at Ripon College Cuddesdon, he was made deacon on Trinity Sunday 1900 (10 June) and ordained priest on St Thomas' Day 1902 (21 December) — both times by Randall Davidson, Bishop of Winchester, at Winchester Cathedral. His first post was as a Minor Canon at Bloemfontein Cathedral. Returning to England he was Vicar of St Martin's, Leicester before his appointment to the episcopate. He was consecrated a bishop on Ascension Day (1 May) by Randall Davidson, by then Archbishop of Canterbury, at Southwark Cathedral.

Serving as Bishop suffragan of Leicester, he held both the Archdeaconry of Northampton and a residentiary canonry at Peterborough Cathedral with his See from 1919 until his resigned the See, due to the erection in 1926 of the new Diocese of Leicester. He continued as an Assistant Bishop of Peterborough — effectively in the same role, without a title — until his retirement in 1945. Alongside that post and his canonry, he remained Archdeacon of Northampton until 1936, after which he became Archdeacon of Oakham.

Church of England titles
Preceded by Lewis Clayton	Bishop of Leicester; 1913–1927	Succeeded by himself as Assistant Bishop of Peterborough (Diocese of Leicester erected)
