= John Chambre =

English churchman, academic and physician

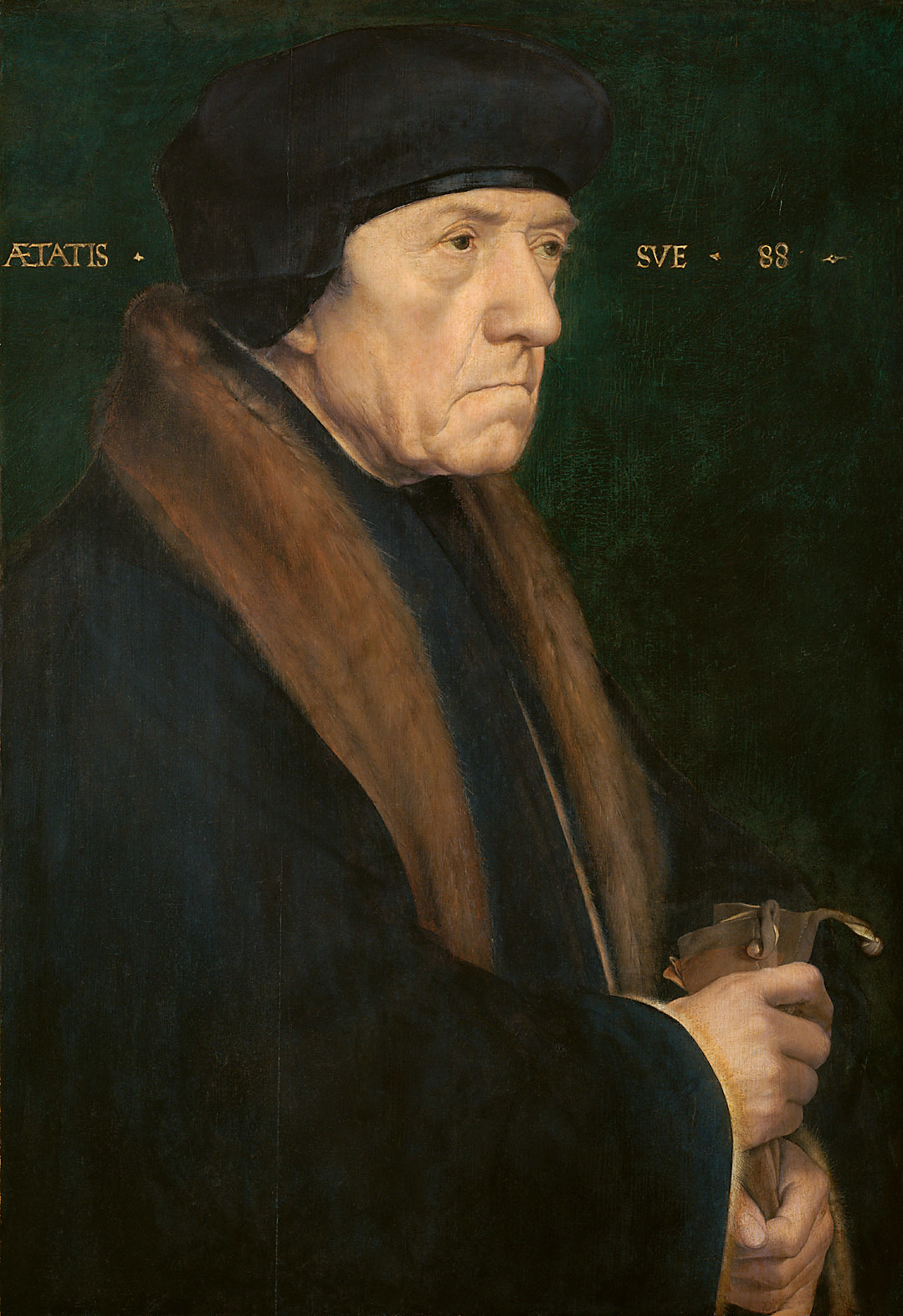
Portrait by Hans Holbein the Younger

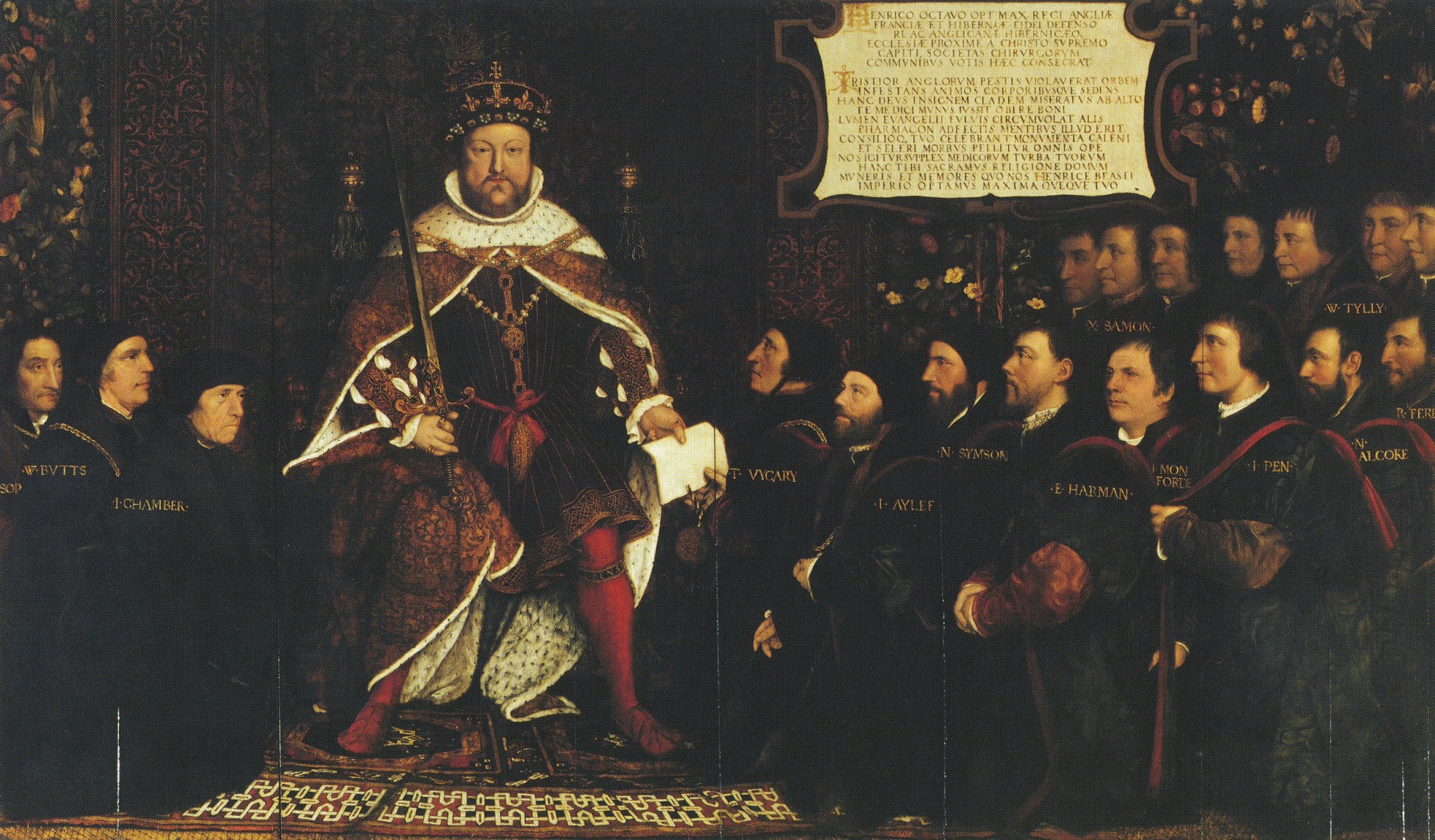
In this picture from the 1540s by Hans Holbein of the granting of the charter to the barber surgeons, Chambre appears just to the left of Henry VIII. He is witnessing the giving of the sealed charter into the hand of Thomas Vicary.

John Chambre (also Chamber or Chambers) (1470–1549) was an English churchman, academic and physician.

== Early life ==
Born in Northumberland, Chambre studied at Oxford, where he was elected fellow of Merton College in 1492. Having taken holy orders, he was presented to the living of Titchmarsh, Northamptonshire.

== Medical career ==
After graduating M.A., Chambre visited Italy, studied medicine there, and graduated at the University of Padua. On his return became physician to Henry VII of England, and retained the position under Henry VIII. He received the degree of M.D. at Oxford in 1531.

When the College of Physicians was founded in 1518, Chambre was the first named in its charter. He was censor of the College of Physicians in 1523. Some of his prescriptions for lotions and plasters were preserved in manuscript, and a letter signed by him on the health of Queen Jane Seymour.

== Church career ==
In 1508 Chambre was given the living of Bowden in Leicestershire, from 1494 to 1509 he held the prebend of Codringham in Lincoln Cathedral, and from 1509 to 1549 that of Leighton Buzzard there; and in the same diocese, as then constituted, he held the archdeaconry of Bedford from 1525 to 1549. He was also treasurer of Wells 1510 to 1543, and in 1537 canon of Wiveliscombe; he was precentor of Exeter 1524 to 1549, canon of Windsor 1509 to 1549, Archdeacon of Meath 1540 to 1542, and dean of the collegiate chapel of St. Stephen's, Westminster.

Chambre was also Warden of Merton College, Oxford, from 1525 to 1544.

== Later life ==
Chambre built the cloisters of St. Stephen's chapel at his own cost, but lived to see them demolished as a consequence of the Protestant Reformation. He died in 1549, and was buried in St. Margaret's, Westminster.
