= Marshall Lang =

Marshall Lang may refer to:

- Marshall Lang (father) (1834–1909), moderator of the General Assembly of the Church of Scotland for 1893
- Marshall Lang (son) (1868–1954), moderator of the General Assembly of the Church of Scotland for 1935
- Marshall Lang (American football), American football tight end
