= Zachary Boyd =

Scottish minister and writer (1585–1653)

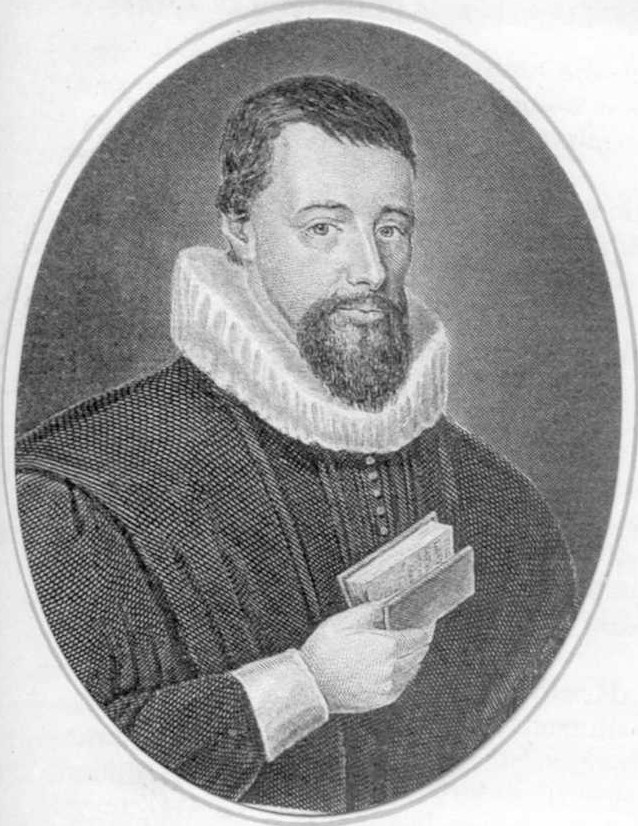
- Born: 1585; Scotland
- Died: 1653 (aged 67–68)
- Occupation: religious writer

Zachary Boyd (1585–1653) was a Scottish minister and university administrator who wrote many sermons, scriptural versifications and other devotional works. He served as Dean of Faculties, Rector and Vice-Chancellor at the University of Glasgow during the 1630s and 1640s, and bequeathed a generous legacy to the university including his library and large manuscript collection of unpublished sermons and verse.

== Life ==
Boyd was born into the family of Boyd of Pinkhill, Ayrshire. He first studied at the University of Glasgow and then went to Saumur in France. There he followed courses of his kinsman Robert Boyd and in 1611 became Regent Professor. He returned to Glasgow in 1621 and became Minister of Barony Parish in 1625. During the 1630s and 1640s he served as Dean of Faculties, Rector and Vice-Chancellor of the Glasgow University.

He was a moderate royalist who, like many faculty members at Glasgow, was initially reluctant to subscribe to the National Covenant in 1638, though in time he did so. As a Scottish Presbyterian his primary concern during the Wars of the Three Kingdoms was to guarantee Presbyterian church government in Scotland. In a poem about the Battle of Newburn Boyd celebrated the Scottish victory but stopped short of saying that the King himself had been defeated. After many magistrates and ministers subsequently fled Glasgow, Boyd remained behind and met Oliver Cromwell in October 1648: Cromwell was advised to 'pistol the scoundrel' but instead invited Boyd for dinner.

== Family ==
Boyd was married twice;

- Elizabeth Fleming (no children)
- Margaret Mure (born 1618); no children. After Boyd's death, Margaret married James Durham and edited some of his sermons and books.

== Works ==
Three collections of Boyd's verse were printed during his lifetime. The Garden of Zion (1644) is a two-volume work that versifies Job, Proverbs, Ecclesiastes, the Song of Solomon, and other Old Testament songs. Boyd sought to have his rhymed psalter (printed in 1644) and scriptural songs (1645) accepted as the standard text for use in England and Scotland. Though the Scottish General Assembly sent his psalms to the Westminster Assembly for consideration, Robert Baillie criticized Boyd for his 'fruitles designe' in seeking to have his psalter adopted. These books were printed by George Anderson, an unofficial printer to the university whom Boyd supported during his time as Vice-Chancellor.

His printed prose consists of a variety of devotional works. The largest is the prose treatise Last Battell of the Soule in Death (Edinburgh, 1628), a text written in the Ars moriendi tradition to offer solace to those approaching death. Cleare Forme of Catechising (Glasgow, 1639) is a children's catechism. A Sermon of Preparation to the Communion and A Sermon for the Day of the Sacrament (Edinburgh, 1629) and Two Orientall Pearles, Grace and Glory (Edinburgh, 1629) made a small number of Boyd's sermons available in print, but Boyd left over 250 more in manuscript.

Boyd also left a substantial quantity of scriptural versifications. Boyd's autograph manuscripts, which are held at Glasgow University Library, include Zions Flowers (or 'Christian Poems for Spiritual Edification'), the didactic set of exercises The English Academie and versified Gospels entitled The Four Evangels. Zions Flowers versifies nineteen biblical narratives from the Old Testament, such as Pharaoh's Tyrannie and Death, David and Goliath and Destruction of Sodom. Known collectively as Boyd's Bible - though Boyd never did versify the entire Bible - these poems' critical estimation has never been high: representative is the nineteenth-century writer John Marshall Lang's opinion that Boyd "was not a poet, yet he was something more than a mere doggerel rhymer [...] the commendable features are often marred not merely by rugged verse, but also by hard and unsympathetic thought." Boyd's versifications are remarkable for the extent to which they contain phrases and imagery appropriated from Josuah Sylvester's translation of Guillaume de Saluste Du Bartas' Semaines and Sylvester's other works. Boyd's Deed of Mortification indicated that a portion of the money he donated to Glasgow was to be used for printing his poems; it never was. However, the bibliographer Gabriel Neil did print four poems from Zion's Flowers in 1855, and David Atkinson produced an edition of Boyd's Selected Sermons for the Scottish Text Society in 1989.

=== List of works ===
A list of Boyd's works includes;

- The balme of Gilead prepared for the sicke, 1629
- The last battell of the soule, 1629
- Two orientall pearles, grace and glory, 1629
- Two sermons, 1629
- A cleare forme of catechising, 1639
- Foure letters of comforts, 1640
- Crosses, comforts, counsels, 1643
- The sword of the Lord and of Gideon, 1643
- The garden of Zion, 1644
- Zachary Boyd (1648). The Psalmes of David in Meeter: With the Prose Interlined. Printed at Glasgow: By the heires of George Anderson. OCLC 1547541289.
