= William Duguid =

William Duguid may refer to:

- William Duguid Geddes, Scottish scholar and educationalist
- William Fondleroy Duguid, Barbadian politician and surgeon
