= Church of England Men's Society =

The Church of England Men's Society was founded in 1899 by Archbishop Frederick Temple to bring men together to socialise in a Christian environment.

It began by amalgamating the Church of England's Young Men's Society, the Young Men's Friendly Society, and the Men's Help Society into one organisation. In the first years of the 20th century Cosmo Gordon Lang became its first Chairman. It has often taken a strong viewpoint on such national issues as the force feeding of suffragettes.
