= Barony Hall =

Red sandstone Victorian Gothic church on Castle Street in Glasgow, Scotland

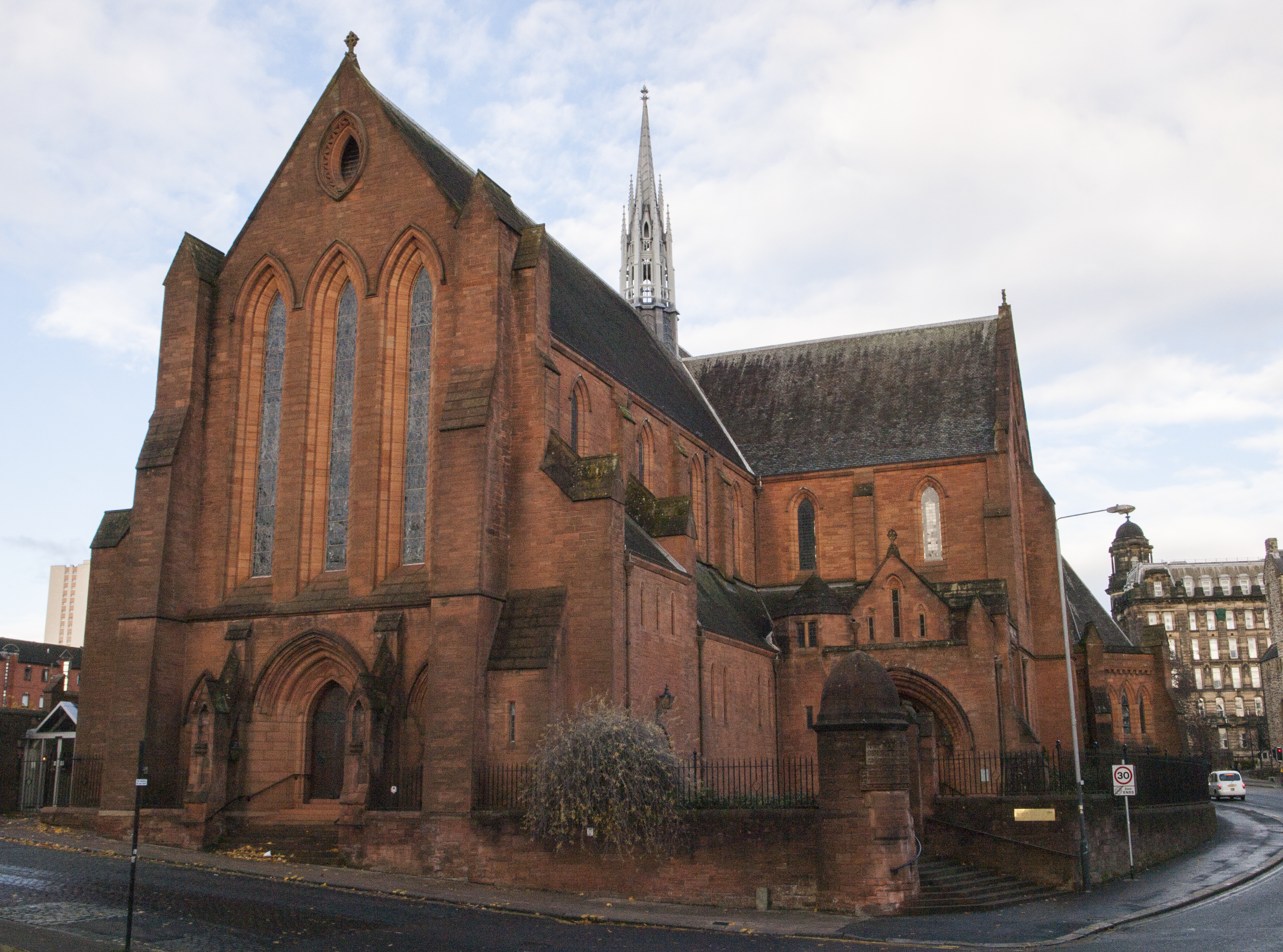
- Interactive map of the Barony Hall area
- Former names: Barony Church

General information
- Status: Completed
- Type: Academic
- Location: Glasgow, Scotland, Rottenrow, Glasgow G4 0RA
- Coordinates: 55.8619°N 4.2370°W
- Current tenants: University of Strathclyde

The Barony Hall, (formerly the Barony Church), is a deconsecrated church building located on Castle Street in the Townhead area of Glasgow, Scotland, near Glasgow Cathedral, Glasgow Royal Infirmary and the city's oldest surviving house, Provand's Lordship. It is built in the red sandstone Victorian neo-Gothic-style. The original or Old Barony Church was built as a part of the Barony Parish in Glasgow by architect, James Adams. It opened in 1799 and served ceremonial and other congregational purposes. The replacement for the old building was designed by J. J. Burnet & J. A. Campbell and raised in 1889, and incorporated architectural artifacts from the old church and a number of other relics.

The New Barony Church was acquired by the University of Strathclyde in 1986. It was restored in 1989 and is now a ceremonial hall and events venue known as the Barony Hall. It is one of the few buildings in the immediate area that survived the slum clearances of the 1960s as part of the Townhead 'Comprehensive Development Area' (CDA).

== History ==
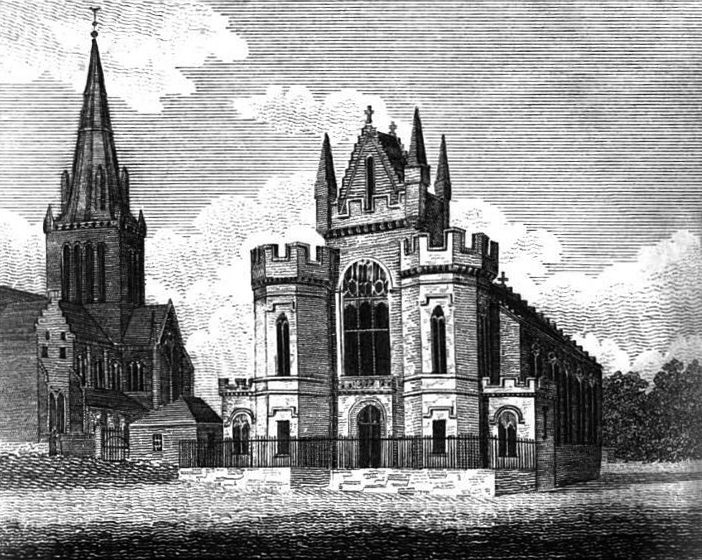
The 1798 Barony Church, pictured in 1825

The Barony Church existed from at least 1595 until 1985. Among its notable ministers were Zachary Boyd (1625–1653), John Burns (1774–1839), Norman McLeod (1851–1872) and John White (1911–1934). Barony Parish received its name from the Barony of Glasgow.

The condition of the church gradually worsened over time, until it was rebuilt in 1798 by architect James Adam. The new design was praised and criticised. Some considered it an architectural jewel, whilst others despised its looks and considered it borderline unappealing, even repulsive. One of the Church's own ministers, Dr. Norman McLeod, is reported to have advised Queen Victoria that it was "the ugliest Kirk in all Europe". After the new church opened, the old crypt was used as a burial ground until 1844.

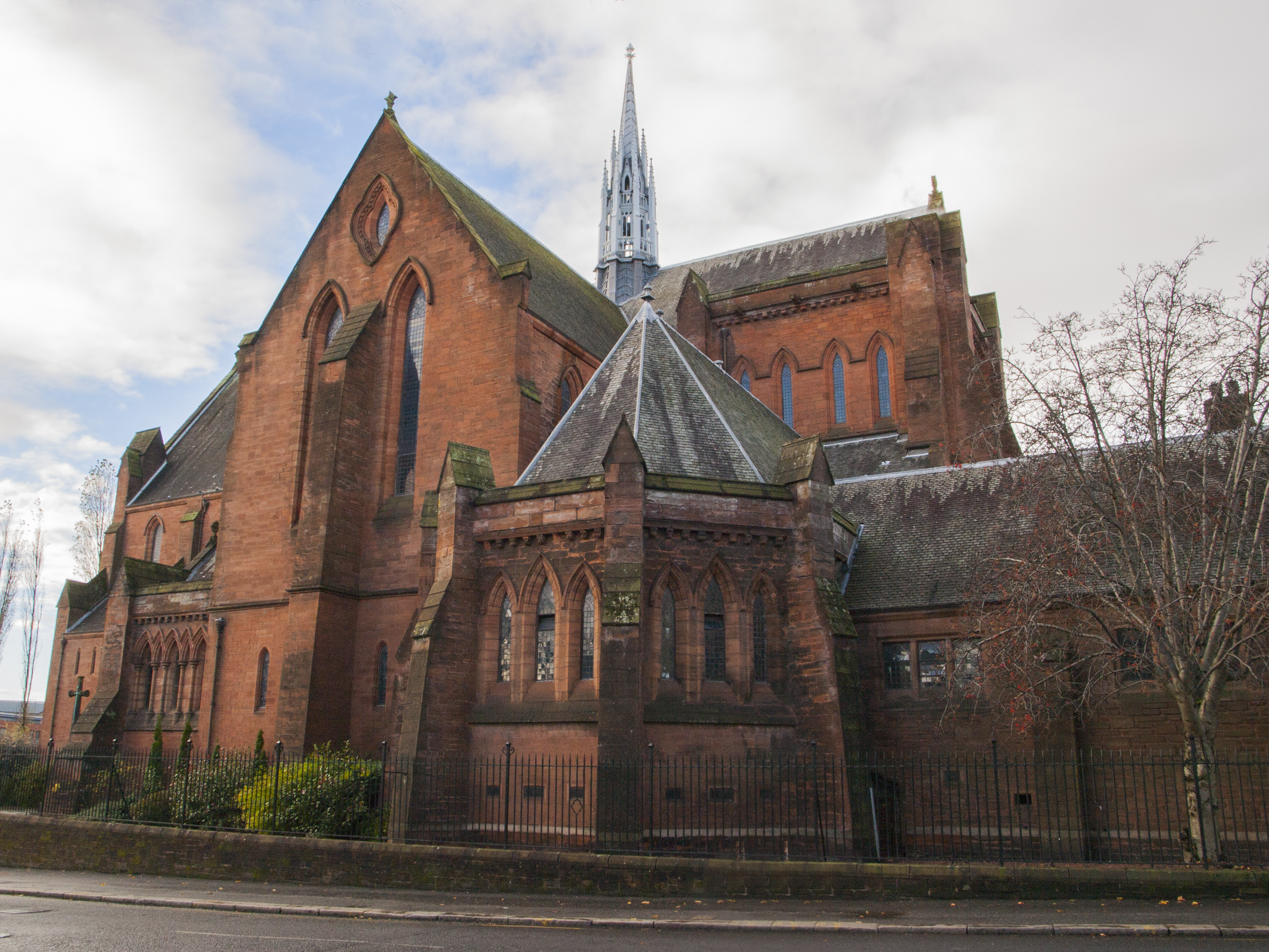
View of Barony Hall's west-facing side as seen from Castle Street

However, not even the new building could solve some of the Barony Church's problems. The few roads leading to the church were little more than dirt tracks, making traveling to and from the church difficult for many of the congregation, especially during winter. It also could not sustainably fulfil all the spiritual requirements of the congregation. This led to several Chapels of Ease being built throughout the Barony area, usually by the local people.

The congregation split into four different parishes: Shettleston (1847), Calton (1849), Maryhill (1850) and Springburn (1854). Church attendees decided to return to St. George's Tron, others to Dennistoun Blackfriars and many came back to the place where Barony originated from, Glasgow Cathedral. Some of the relics from the Barony Church were taken back to the cathedral, including the Communion Table, and a chapel was established in the cathedral's crypt.

Eventually, it was decided that a new building was needed to solve the various problems. A site was acquired on the west side of Castle Street and a red sandstone Gothic church, inspired by Girona Cathedral and Dunblane Cathedral, designed by J.J. Burnet & J.A. Campbell as a part of a competition, was finished in 1889. This new building incorporated architectural artifacts from the old church and a number of other relics. It was dedicated in a service on 27 April 1889. An article in the following day's Glasgow Herald made no direct comment on the building but focused on the sermon by John Caird, the Church of Scotland minister and Principal of the University of Glasgow, in which he "dealt with art in relation to worship, stating that it was weak and foolish to identify purity of worship with ruggedness and baseness of form".

The church was in use for over 100 years, but the congregation dwindled rapidly from the 1950s onward after the Townhead CDA was established and the mass demolition of surrounding homes took place to make way for the Royal College of Science and Technology's growth into what is now the University of Strathclyde. In its final years, the congregation joined with St. Paul's & St. David's (Ramshorn) to form the Barony Ramshorn in 1982. The last service was held on 6 October 1985 and all the Castle Street buildings were acquired by Strathclyde University in 1986, making it the third church in the area to be acquired by the university and its predecessors - it having already purchased the Ramshorn in 1983, and St. Paul's Church on Martha Street had been purchased by the Royal Technical College in 1953.

After a restoration in 1989 by the university, the building is now called Barony Hall. The development, designed by David Leslie Architects, cost £3.4 million, with sums received through grants and hundreds of private donations.

== Barony Hall today ==
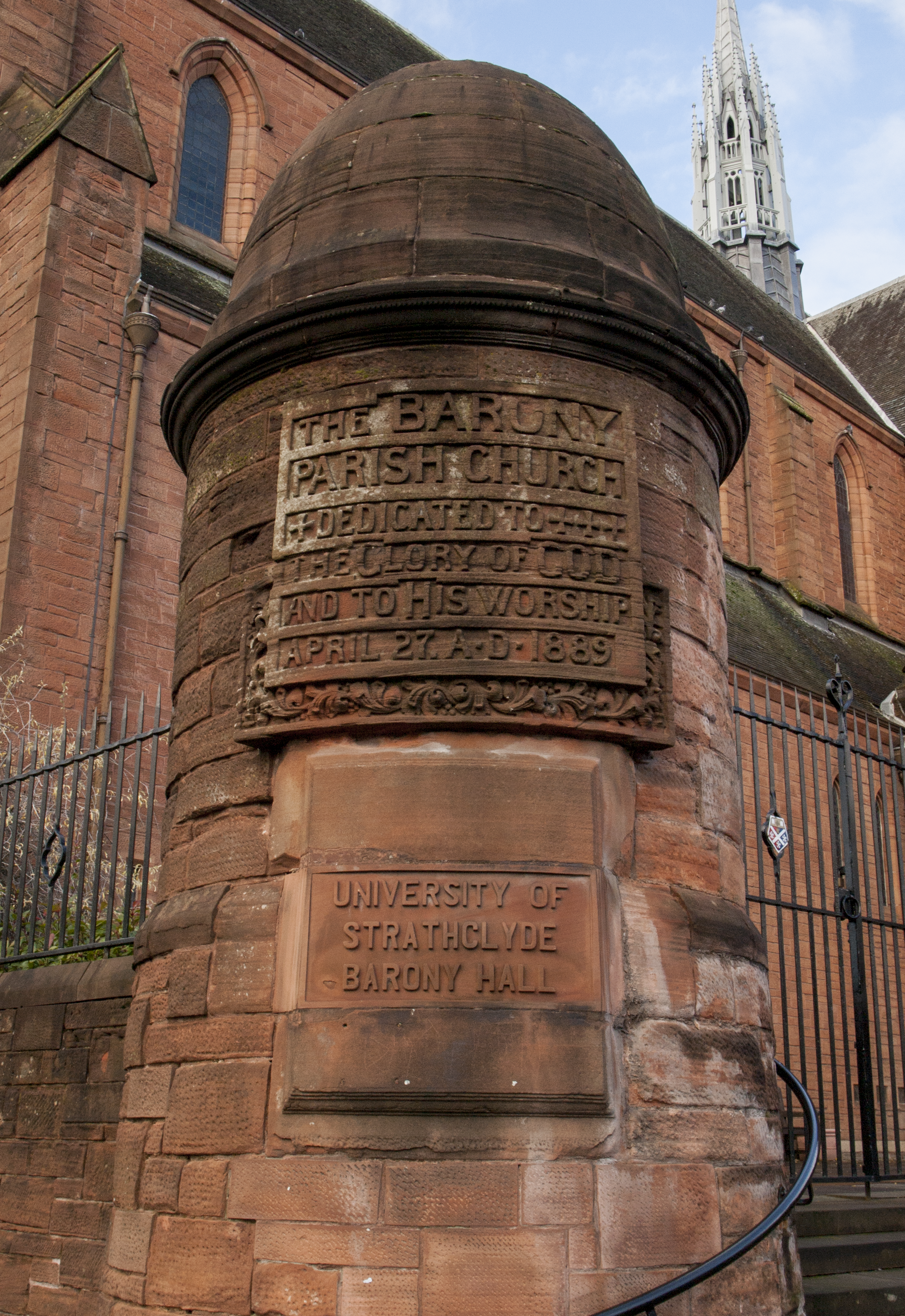
Original inscription pillar: "The Barony Parish Church. Dedicated to the glory of god and his worship. 27 April A.D. 1889."

The war is also marked by a memorial to the dead – a plaque bearing 125 names connected to the church at the side of the stage in the Great Hall. Below sits the 1799 building's foundation stone, bearing the names of the ministers who served there during its 90-year life.

An original inscription can be found on a pillar of Barony Church on the corner of the Rottenrow street and Castle street, dedicating the building to the glory and worship of God. The date on the pillar dates back to the first dedication service held in the rebuilt building, on 27 April 1989. A new inscription can be found under the original one, which was added after the acquirement of the Church by the University of Strathclyde, addressing the building as Barony Hall and as a part of the university campus.

The Barony houses the Maurice Taylor Organ, which was installed in 2010. A Bach-style organ, the first of its kind to be commissioned in the UK, the instrument is designed for performances of Bach's music in its original form and has since been played in numerous concerts and recitals. It has forty-one speaking stops, three manuals, one pedal, three thousand pipes, and features mechanical key and stop action. The bellows feed air blown by foot pedals, as happened in the Baroque period, or can be worked electronically.

Restoration work by Strathclyde University won awards from Europa Nostra Award, the UK Civic Trust, Glasgow Civic Trust and the Royal Incorporation of Architects in Scotland. The certificates for these awards are displayed in the corridor which connects the Great Hall to the cloakroom. Also on display are thousands of degree certificates which have been presented in the Barony since 1989.

== Functions ==
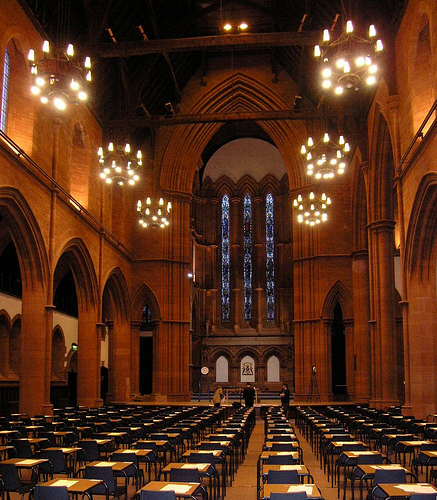
Interior of the hall in use by the University of Strathclyde

After the Barony Church building was acquired by the University of Strathclyde in 1986, it became the university's Barony Hall, hosting graduations, student exams, and functions. Aside from university purposes, the Barony Hall is a well-known venue in the city. The hall hosts a variety of celebrations and formalities including:

- Weddings – The Great Hall and the Winter Gardens are often used as wedding venues. Their city centre location is close to public transport such as Buchanan bus station and Glasgow Queen Street railway station.
- Graduation – The Barony Hall hosts annual inauguration events and graduation ceremonies for the students of the University of Strathclyde.
- Exhibitions
- Meetings
- Seminars
- Concerts
- Functions

There are three more areas in the building: the Winter Gardens, the Bicentenary Hall, and the Sir Patrick Thomas Room. These can be used for many purposes such as registration, catering, and break-out areas. Main events taking place in the Barony Hall are exhibitions, weddings, dinners, dinners/dances and receptions. The Hall offers more than 250 square metres of space and can hold up to 500 people (theatre-style) on the flat floor area in the Great Hall or up to 600 when using the Balcony.

== Notable connections ==
John Marshall Lang, father of Cosmo Gordon Lang, Archbishop of Canterbury from 1928 until 1942, was a minister at the Barony Church.
