= Rhymed psalter =

Translations of the Psalms from Hebrew or Latin into poetry in some other language

Rhymed psalters are translations of the Psalms from Hebrew or Latin into poetry in some other language. Rhymed psalters include metrical psalters designed for singing, but are not limited to that use.

== Origins ==
The origins of the rhymed psalter lie in twelfth-century translations from the Latin Vulgate into French. These were made in England for the French-speaking Anglo-Normans.

Following the Protestant Reformation rhymed metrical psalters like the Dutch Souterliedekens came into popular use for congregational singing. While singing was not the original purpose of rhymed psalters, these psalters make up the bulk of the existing rhymed versions of Bible passages. The Book of Proverbs is one of the few other Biblical books having verse translations.

== English rhymed psalters ==
The oldest English rhymed psalter is a translation of the Vulgate psalms, generally dated to the reign of Henry II of England. Another rhyming psalter of much the same style is assigned epigraphically to the time of Edward II of England. The Surtees Psalter in rhymed Middle English dates from 1250 to 1300.

Thomas Brampton translated the Seven Penitential Psalms from the Vulgate into rhyming verse in 1414. These and other pre-Reformation rhyming psalters demonstrate the popular use of the vernacular Scripture in England, contradicting the belief that the singing of psalms in English began only with the Reformation. "While Sir Thomas Wyat (died 1521) is said to have done the whole psalter, we have only Certayne Psalmes chosen out of the Psalter of David, commonly called the VII Penitential Psalmes, Drawen into English metre." Henry Howard, Earl of Surrey (d. 1547) translated Psalms 55, 73, and 88 into English verse.

Miles Coverdale (died 1567) translated several psalms in Goastly psalmes and spirituall songs drawen out of the Holy Scripture. The 1562 edition of the Anglican Book of Common Prayer contains thirty-seven rhyming psalms translated by Thomas Sternhold, fifty-eight by John Hopkins, twenty-eight by Thomas Norton, and the remainder by Robert Wisdom (Ps. 125), William Whittingham (Ps. 119 of 700 lines) and others. Sternhold's psalms had been previously published in 1549. Also in 1549, Robert Crowley translated the entire psalter in verse.

The Seven Penitential Psalms were frequently translated. In 1583 William Hunnis entitled his translation "Seven Sobs of a Sorrowful Soul for Sinne". During the reign of Edward VI, Sir Thomas Smith translated ninety-two of the psalms into English verse while imprisoned in the Tower of London. A chaplain to Queen Mary I of England, calling himself the "symple and unlearned Syr William Forrest, preeiste", did a poetic version of fifty psalms in 1551. Matthew Parker, later Archbishop of Canterbury, completed a metrical psalter in 1557. The Scotch had their Psalmes buickes from 1564. One of the most renowned of Scotch versifiers of the Psalms was Robert Pont (1575). Zachary Boyd, another Scotsman, published the Psalms in verse early in the seventeenth century.

The complete rhyming psalter by Sir Philip Sidney (d. 1586) and his sister, Countess of Pembroke, is notable for the variety of its versification: it employs almost all of the varieties of lyric metres typically used in its time. However, it was not published until 1823.

Francis Bacon's poetic paraphrases of several psalms are distinctive because of his stately and elegant style. Richard Verstegan, a Catholic, published a rhyming version of the Seven Penitential Psalms (1601). In 1636, George Sandys published a volume containing a metrical version of other parts of the Bible together with "a Paraphrase upon the Psalmes of David, set to new Tunes for Private Devotion, and a Thorow Base for Voice and Instruments".

== Psalm books ==
The Psalm Books of the various Protestant churches are mostly rhyming versions. They include:

- New England Psalm Book (Boston, 1773);
- Psalm Book of the Reformed Dutch Church in North America (New York, 1792);
- The Bay Psalm Book (Cambridge, 1640).
- Brady and Tate (poet laureate), "New Version of the Psalms of David" (Boston, 1696);
- James Merrick, "The Psalms in English Verse" (Reading, England, 1765);
- Isaac Watts, "The Psalms of David: Imitated in the Language of the New Testament, and Apply'd to the Christian State and Worship" (1719);
- J. T. Barrett, "A Course of Psalms" (Lambeth, 1825);
- Abraham Coles, "A New Rendering of the Hebrew Psalms into English Verse" (New York, 1885);
- David S. Wrangham, "Lyra Regis" (Leeds, 1885); Arthur Trevor Jebb "A Book of Psalms" (London, 1898).

== Other rhymed passages ==
Other parts of the Bible done into rhyming English verse are:

- Christopher Tye's The Acts of the Apostles translated into English Metre (1553)
- Zachary Boyd's St. Matthew (early seventeenth cent.)
- Thomas Prince's "Canticles, parts of Isaias and Revelations" in New England Psalm Book (1758)
- Henry Ainsworth, "Solomon's Song of Songs" (1642)
- John Mason Good's "Song of Songs" (London, 1803)
- C. C. Price's "Acts of the Apostles" (New York, 1845)

== Other languages ==
The French have had rhyming psalters since the "Sainctes Chansonettes en Rime Française" of Clément Marot (1540).

Some Italian rhymed versions of the Bible are:

- Giovanni Diodati, "La Sacra Bibbia" (2nd ed, Geneva, 1641);
- Francesco Rezzano, "II Libro di Giobbe" (Nice, 1781);
- Stefano Egidio Petroni, "Proverbi di Salomone" (London, 1815);
- Pietro Rossi, "Lamentazioni di Geremia, i Sette Salmi Penitenziali e il Cantico di Mose" (Nizza, 1781);
- Evasio Leone, "II Cantico de' Cantici" (Venice, 1793);
- Francesco Campana, "Libro di Giuditta" (Nizza, 1782).

== Notes ==
Attribution
