= James Durham (minister) =

Scottish presbyterian pastor

Personal details
- Born: 1622
- Died: 25 June 1658 (aged 35–36)
- Denomination: Christian
- Education: University of St Andrews

James Durham (1622 – 25 June 1658) was a Scottish Christian preacher; a supporter of the Scottish Reformation, he refused to follow the episcopal church of the king of England, and preached as a Covenanter.

He was licensed as a preacher in 1646; four years later, he was offered the post of Professor of Divinity in the college of Glasgow, but instead took the post of chaplain to the king's family.

== Early life ==
He was the eldest son of John Durham of Easter Powrie (now Wedderburn), north of Dundee. He was educated at University of St Andrews, and betook himself to the life of a country gentleman. While visiting the family of his wife (Anna, daughter of Francis Durham of Duntarvie) in the parish of Abercorn, he came under profound religious impressions in consequence of a sermon by Andrew Melvill, minister of Queensferry.

Joining in the Civil War, he was promoted captain, and seriously exhorted and led the devotions of his company; this being noticed by Professor Dickson, he was induced to prepare himself for the ministry, a resolution which was hastened by two narrow escapes on the battlefield.

== Career ==
He graduated M.A. (Glasgow, 1 May 1647). He was licensed for the ministry by the Presbytery of Irvine 18 May 1647. He was admitted to the congregation of Blackfriars 2 December 1647.

For a time he exercised his ministry in Glasgow, and in 1650 he was appointed professor of divinity in the university there. But before he could be settled in that office the general assembly decided that he should attend as chaplain on the king. The duties of this office he discharged 'with such majesty and awe' as to inspire the court with much reverence for him. When free from this situation he was again called to the ministry in Glasgow, and inducted into the 'Inner Kirk' (at the time one of three congregations meeting in the High Kirk - aka Glasgow Cathedral).

His health had never been strong, and he was prematurely old, partly the effect of the singularly laborious life of study which he led. He died of consumption, 25 June 1658.

== Family ==
He married twice;

- (1) Anna (died about 1648), daughter of Francis Durham of Duntarvie. They had one child – Francis of Pitkerrow, advocate, died 1667
- (2) 14 Dec. 1653, Margaret Mure of Glanderston (died in 1692 or 1693), widow of Zachary Boyd (minister of the Barony Parish). They had three children – James of Largo; Alexander of Largo; John.

After Durham's death, his widow Margaret edited some of his unpublished manuscripts, including his Treatise on the Ten Commandments, (which condemned the government) and Clavis Cantici, or an Exposition of the Song of Solomon. She continued to attend and host illegal conventicle meetings and at one point was arrested and imprisoned for ten days.

== Works ==
- A Commentarie upon the Book of Revelation (Edinburgh, 1658, 1680; London, 1658; Amsterdam, 1660; Glasgow, 1680, 1739, 1764, 1788; Falkirk, 1799)
- The Dying Man's Testament to the Church of Scotland (Edinburgh, 1659, 1680 bis, 1690; London, 1659; Glasgow, 1740);
- Clavis Cantici, or an Exposition of the Song of Solomon (Edinburgh, 1668, 1723, 1724; London, 1669; Utrecht, 1681; Glasgow, 1688, 1723, 1770, 1788; Peterhead, 1840)
- The Law Unsealed, or an Exposition of the Ten Commandments (London, 1675; Edinburgh, 1676 (thrice), 1703, 1715, 1735, 1782, 1802; Glasgow, 1676, 1677, 1777, 1798, 1802; Reformation Heritage, 2018)
- The Blessedness of the Death of those who Died in the Lord (Glasgow, 1681, 1751, 1754, 1756; Edinburgh, 1682, 1684, 1713)
- Christ Crucified, or The Marrow of the Gospel, LXXII. Sermons on 53 Chapters of Isaiah (Edinburgh, 1683, 1686, 1702, 1726; London, 1723; Glasgow, 1761, 1769, 1792)
- The Unsearchable Riches of Christ (Glasgow, 1685, 1695, 1709, 1764, 1773; Edinburgh, 1696, 1704, 1729, 1745; Falkirk, 1786; Berwick, 1794)
- Heaven upon Earth, in the Serene Tranquility of a Good Conscience (Edinburgh, 1685, 1732)
- The Great Gain of Contenting Godliness (Edinburgh, 1685; Glasgow, 1777)
- The Great Corruption of Subtile Self (Edinburgh, 1686; Glasgow, 1723)
- An Exposition of the whole Book of Job (Glasgow, 1759)

His works, which were chiefly posthumous, are as follows:

- 1. 'Heaven upon Earth; twenty-two sermons,’ 1657.
- 2. 'A Commentary on the Book of Revelation,’ 1658.
- 3. 'The Dying Man's Testament to the Church of Scotland, or a Treatise concerning Scandal,’ 1659.
- 4. 'An Exposition of the Book of Job,’ 1659.
- 5. 'Clavis Cantici, or an Exposition of the Song of Solomon,’ 1668.
- 6. 'Sum of Saving Knowledge' (with David Dickson), 1671
- 7. 'The Law Unsealed, or a Practical Exposition of the Ten Commandments,’ 1676.
- 8. 'The Blessedness of the Dead that Die in the Lord,’ seven sermons, 1682.
- 9. 'Christ Crucified,’ an exposition of Isaiah liii., 1683.
- 10. 'The Unsearchable Riches of Christ,’ communion sermons, 1684.
- 11. 'Sermons on Godliness and SelfDenial,’ 1685.
- 12. 'The great Corruption of Subtile Self,’ seven sermons, 1686.
- There has also been published 'Dickson and Durham against Independency, or some quotations out of Mr. D. Dickson's Treatise on the Confession of Faith, and out of Durham on the Revelation.'

== Legacy ==
Durham was a man of intense strength of conviction and great gravity of character. It is said of him, as of Robert Leighton, to whom in certain respects he bore a resemblance, that he was seldom known to smile. His studies, both in scripture and in the theological and ecclesiastical questions of the day, were carried on with extraordinary diligence. Of his devotion to the Christian ministry he gave decided proof, both by his laboriousness in the work and by his retiring from the position and enjoyments of a country gentleman's life. Of his power and faithfulness as a preacher a remarkable illustration is said to have occurred at the time of Cromwell's invasion of Scotland. It is said that Cromwell entered his church incognito, and got a seat as it happened in the pew of the provost's daughter, who, as he wore the dress of an English officer, was by no means very courteous to him. At the close of the service Cromwell asked her the preacher's name. She gave a curt reply and asked why he wished to know. Cromwell replied 'because he perceived him to be a very great man, and in his opinion might be chaplain to any prince in Europe, though he had never seen him nor heard of him before.' It is certain that Durham preached before Cromwell against the English invasion. One version of the story has it that Cromwell asked him whether it was his habit to preach on politics, and that he replied that it was not, but seeing him present he thought it right to let him know his mind. Durham was held by his contemporaries in the very highest esteem as one of the most able and godly men of the time. For one so young he was a voluminous writer. He was buried in the Blacadder Aisle of Glasgow Cathedral and, though no monument remains, the inscription can still be seen in the wall.

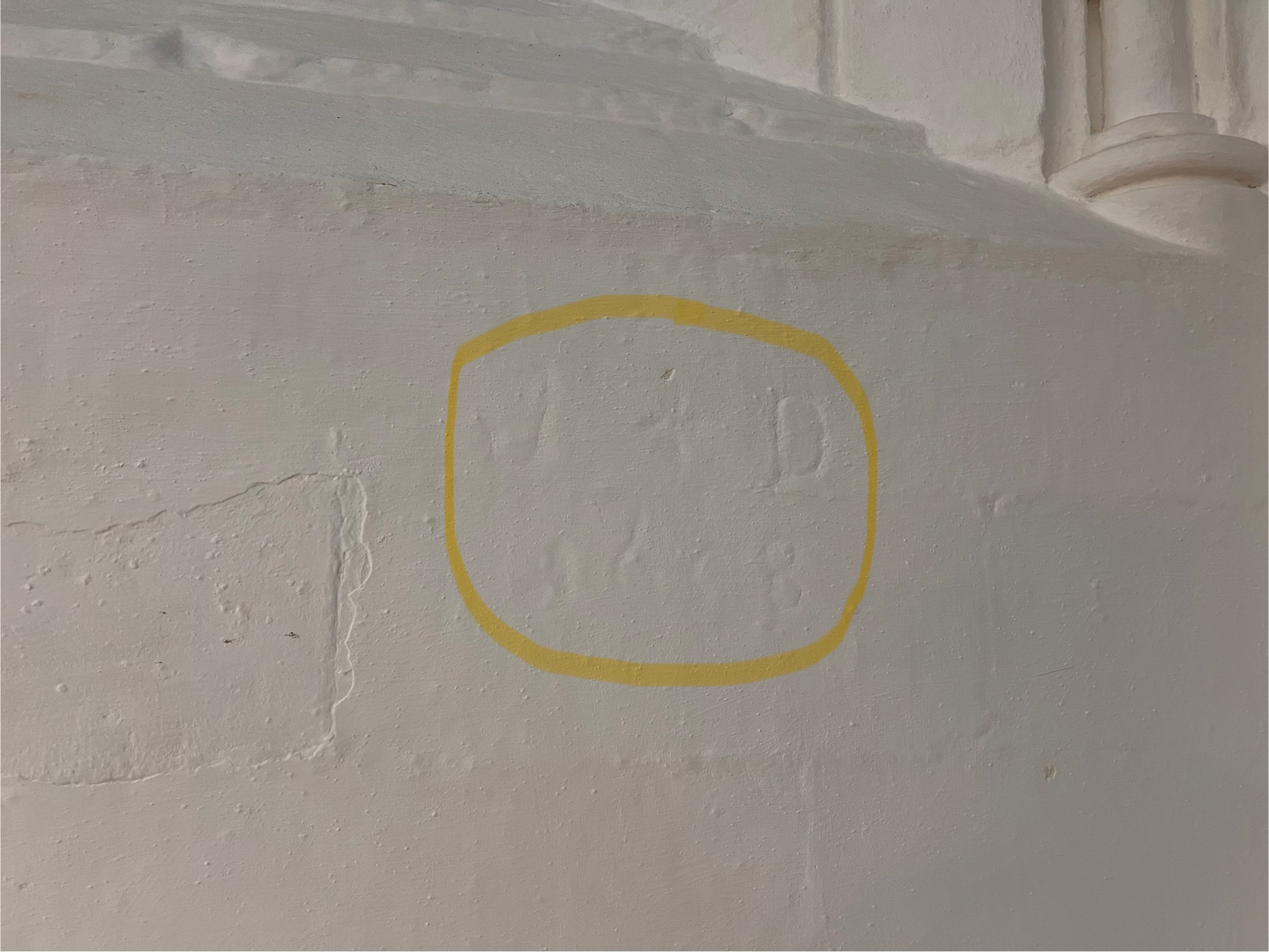
Markings in wall showing place of Durham’s burial

== Bibliography ==
- Glasg. Tests.
- Glasg. Marr. Reg.
- Baillie's Lett.
- Wodrow's Hist., ii. 286, iii. 10, 54
- Caldwell Papers, i.
- Inq. Ret. Gen., 4410, 4733
- Brodie's Diary
- Blair's Autob.
- Rutherfurd's Lett.
- G. R. Inhib., 8 Jan. 1649
- G. R. Homings, 9 July 1675
- Dict. Nat. Biog.
- Edinburgh Bibliographical Society, xi.
- information from George Christie, minister of St Andrew's Parish, Edinburgh.
- A Collection of some Memorable Things in the Life of that truly great and eminent Man, Mr. James Durham, prefixed to the Treatise on Scandal
- Wodrow's Analecta
- Baillie's Letters and Journals
- Scott's Fasti, pt. iii. 5, 17, 32
- Chambers's Biog. Dict. of Eminent Scotsmen
- M'Crie's Story of the Scottish Church
