= Murroes =

Coordinates: 56.5039°N 2.8756°W

- Location within Angus Location near the Dundee City council area
- OS grid reference: NO462350
- Council area: Angus
- Lieutenancy area: Angus
- Country: Scotland
- Sovereign state: United Kingdom
- Post town: DUNDEE
- Postcode district: DD4
- Dialling code: 01382
- Police: Scotland
- Fire: Scottish
- Ambulance: Scottish
- UK Parliament: Dundee East
- Scottish Parliament: Angus South

Murroes is a parish in Angus, Scotland, situated approximately 3 miles (4.8 km) north of Dundee city centre.

== Places of interest ==
- The parish church was built in 1848
- Ballumbie House
- Powrie Castle
- Wedderburn Castle

== Notable residents ==
- In the reign of Charles II the minister was Robert Edward, author of an account of Forfarshire.
- His son was the non-juror Alexander Edward, who later became a notable architect and landscape architect.
- James Durham

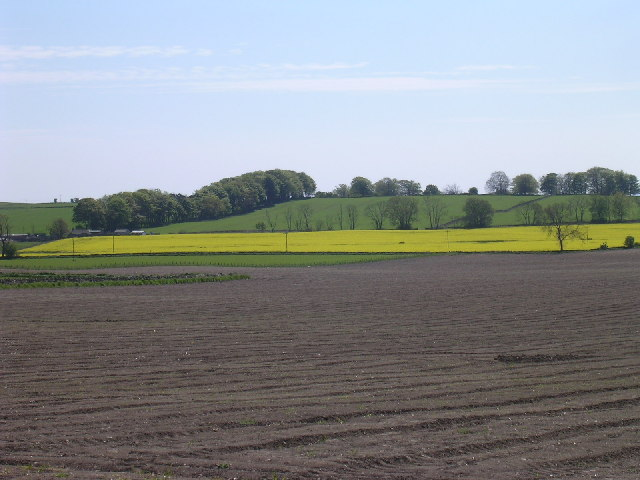
Farmland south of Murroes, looking in the direction of Dundee
