= Cosmo Gordon Lang =

British archbishop (1864–1945)

The Most Reverend and Right Honourable Cosmo Lang GCVO GCStJ PC
- Archbishop of Canterbury
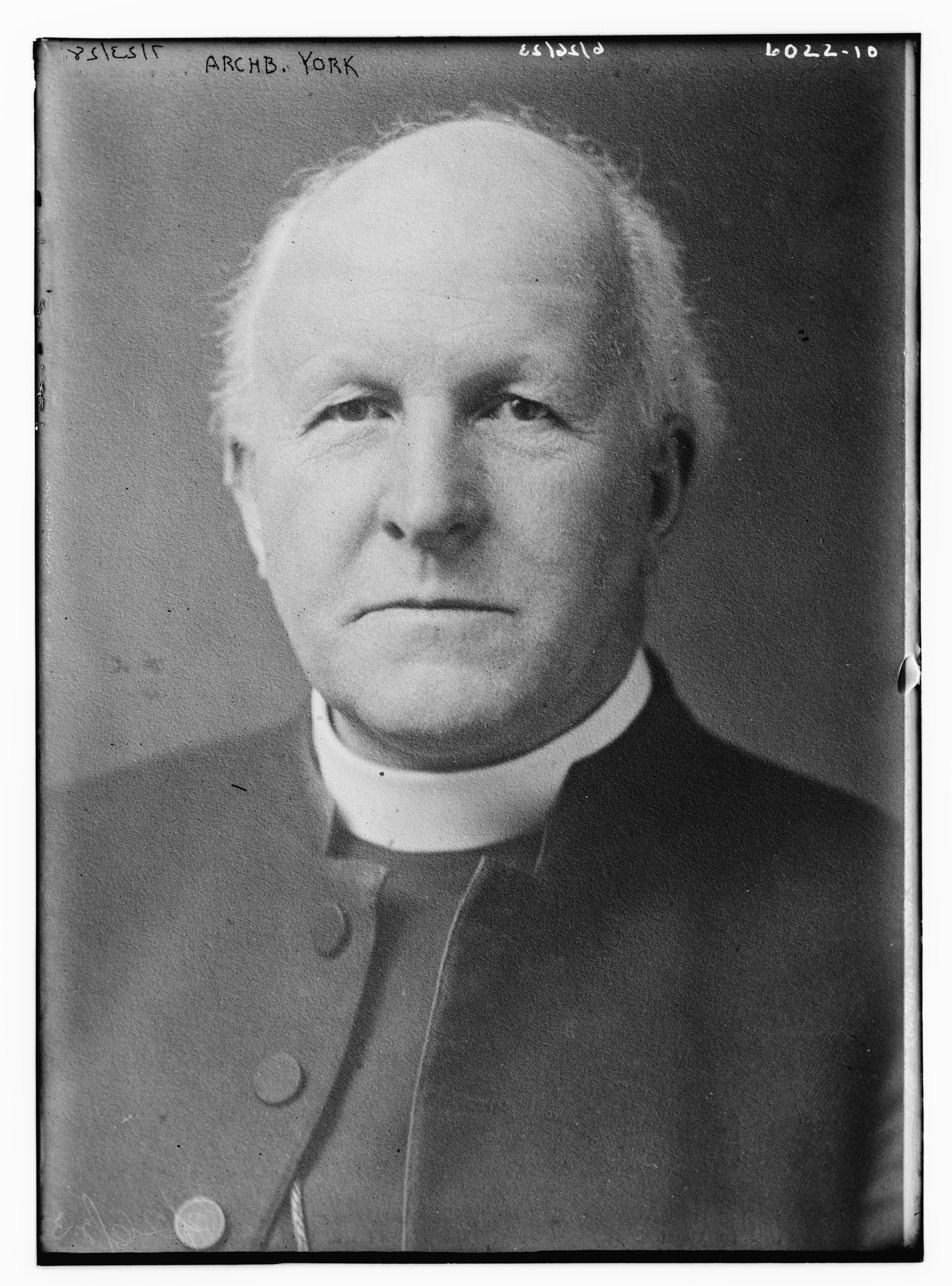
- Archbishop Lang in 1920
- Province: Canterbury
- Diocese: Canterbury
- Installed: 4 December 1928
- Term ended: 31 May 1942
- Predecessor: Randall Davidson
- Successor: William Temple
- Previous posts: Archbishop of York (1909–1928); Bishop of Stepney (1901–1909)

Orders
- Ordination: 1890 (deacon); 24 May 1891 (priest)
- Consecration: 1 May 1901 by Frederick Temple

Personal details
- Born: William Cosmo Gordon Lang; 31 October 1864 Fyvie Manse, Aberdeenshire, Scotland
- Died: 5 December 1945 (aged 81) Richmond, Surrey, England
- Buried: Chapel of St Stephen Martyr, Canterbury Cathedral
- Denomination: Anglican
- Residence: Lambeth Palace (while in office)
- Education: University of Glasgow; Balliol College, Oxford
- Signature: Cosmo Lang's signature

William Cosmo Gordon Lang, 1st Baron Lang of Lambeth, GCVO, GCStJ, PC (31 October 1864 – 5 December 1945) was a Scottish Anglican clergyman who served as Archbishop of York (1908–1928) and Archbishop of Canterbury (1928–1942). His elevation to Archbishop of York, within 18 years of his ordination, was the most rapid in modern Church of England history. As Archbishop of Canterbury during the abdication crisis of 1936, he took a strong moral stance, his comments in a subsequent broadcast being widely condemned as uncharitable towards the departed king.

The son of a Scots Presbyterian minister, Lang abandoned the prospect of a legal and political career to train for the Anglican priesthood. Beginning in 1890, his early ministry was served in slum parishes in Leeds and Portsmouth, except for brief service as Vicar of the University Church of St Mary the Virgin in Oxford. In 1901 he was appointed suffragan Bishop of Stepney in London, where he continued his work among the poor. He also served as a canon of St Paul's Cathedral, London.

In 1908 Lang was nominated as Archbishop of York, despite his relatively junior status as a suffragan rather than a diocesan bishop. His religious stance was broadly Anglo-Catholic, tempered by the liberal Anglo-Catholicism advocated in the Lux Mundi essays. He consequently entered the House of Lords as a Lord Spiritual and caused consternation in traditionalist circles by speaking and voting against the Lords' proposal to reject David Lloyd George's 1909 "People's Budget". This radicalism was not maintained in subsequent years. At the start of the First World War, Lang was heavily criticised for a speech in which he spoke sympathetically of the German Emperor. This troubled him greatly and may have contributed to the rapid ageing which affected his appearance during the war years. After the war he began to promote church unity and at the 1920 Lambeth Conference was responsible for the Church's Appeal to All Christian People. As Archbishop of York he supported controversial proposals for the 1928 revision of the Book of Common Prayer but, after acceding to Canterbury, he took no practical steps to resolve this issue.

Lang became Archbishop of Canterbury in 1928. He presided over the 1930 Lambeth Conference, which gave limited church approval to the use of contraception. After denouncing the Italian invasion of Abyssinia in 1935 and strongly condemning European antisemitism, Lang later supported the appeasement policies of the British government. In May 1937 he presided over the coronation of King George VI and Queen Elizabeth. On retirement in 1942 Lang was raised to the peerage as Baron Lang of Lambeth and continued to attend and speak in House of Lords debates until his death in 1945. Lang himself believed that he had not lived up to his own high standards. Others have praised his qualities of industry, his efficiency and his commitment to his calling.

== Early life ==
=== Childhood and family ===
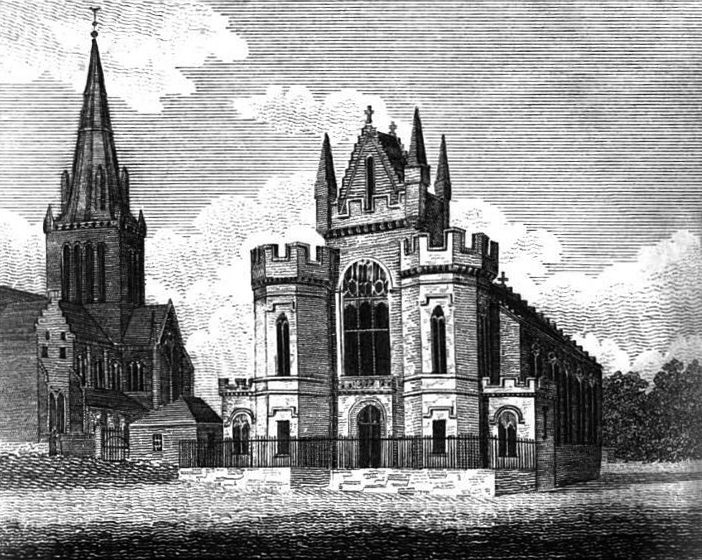
The Barony Church, Glasgow, to which Lang's father was appointed minister in 1873

Cosmo Gordon Lang was born on 31 October 1864 at the manse in Fyvie, Aberdeenshire, the third son of the local Church of Scotland minister, John Marshall Lang, and his wife Hannah Agnes Lang. Cosmo was baptised at Fyvie church by a neighbouring minister, the name "William" being added inadvertently to his given names, perhaps because the local laird was called William Cosmo Gordon. The additional name was rarely used subsequently. In January 1865 the family moved to Glasgow on John Lang's appointment as a minister in the Anderston district. Subsequent moves followed: in 1868 to Morningside, Edinburgh and, in 1873, back to Glasgow when John Lang was appointed minister to the historic Barony Church.

Among Cosmo's brothers were Marshall Buchanan Lang, who followed his father into the Church of Scotland, eventually serving as its Moderator in 1935; and Norman Macleod Lang, who served the Church of England as Bishop suffragan of Leicester.

In Glasgow, Lang attended the Park School, a day establishment where he won a prize for an essay on English literature and played the occasional game of football; otherwise, he recorded, "I was never greatly interested in [the school's] proceedings." Holidays were spent in different parts of Scotland, most notably in Argyll to which, later in life, Lang would frequently return. In 1878, at the age of 14, Lang sat and passed his matriculation examinations. Despite his youth, he began his studies at the University of Glasgow later that year.

=== University of Glasgow ===
At the university Lang's tutors included some of Scotland's leading academics: the Greek scholar Richard Claverhouse Jebb, the physicist William Thomson (who was later created Lord Kelvin) and the philosopher Edward Caird. Long afterwards Lang commented on the inability of some of these eminent figures to handle "the Scottish boors who formed a large part of their classes". Lang was most strongly influenced by Caird, who gave the boy's mind "its first real awakening". Lang recalled how, in a revelation as he was passing through Kelvingrove Park, he expressed aloud his sudden conviction that: "The Universe is one and its Unity and Ultimate Reality is God!" He acknowledged that his greatest failure at the university was his inability to make any progress in his understanding of mathematics, "to me, then and always, unintelligible".

In 1881 Lang made his first trip outside Scotland, to London where he heard the theologian and orator Henry Parry Liddon preach in St Paul's Cathedral. He also heard William Ewart Gladstone and Joseph Chamberlain debating in the House of Commons. Later that year he travelled to Cambridge to stay with a friend who was studying there. A visit to King's College Chapel persuaded Lang that he should study at the college; the following January he sat and passed the entrance examination. When he discovered that as part of his degree studies he would be examined in mathematics, his enthusiasm disappeared. Instead, he applied to Balliol College, Oxford, and was accepted. In mid-1882 he ended his studies at Glasgow with a Master of Arts degree, and was awarded prizes for essays on politics and church history.

=== Oxford ===
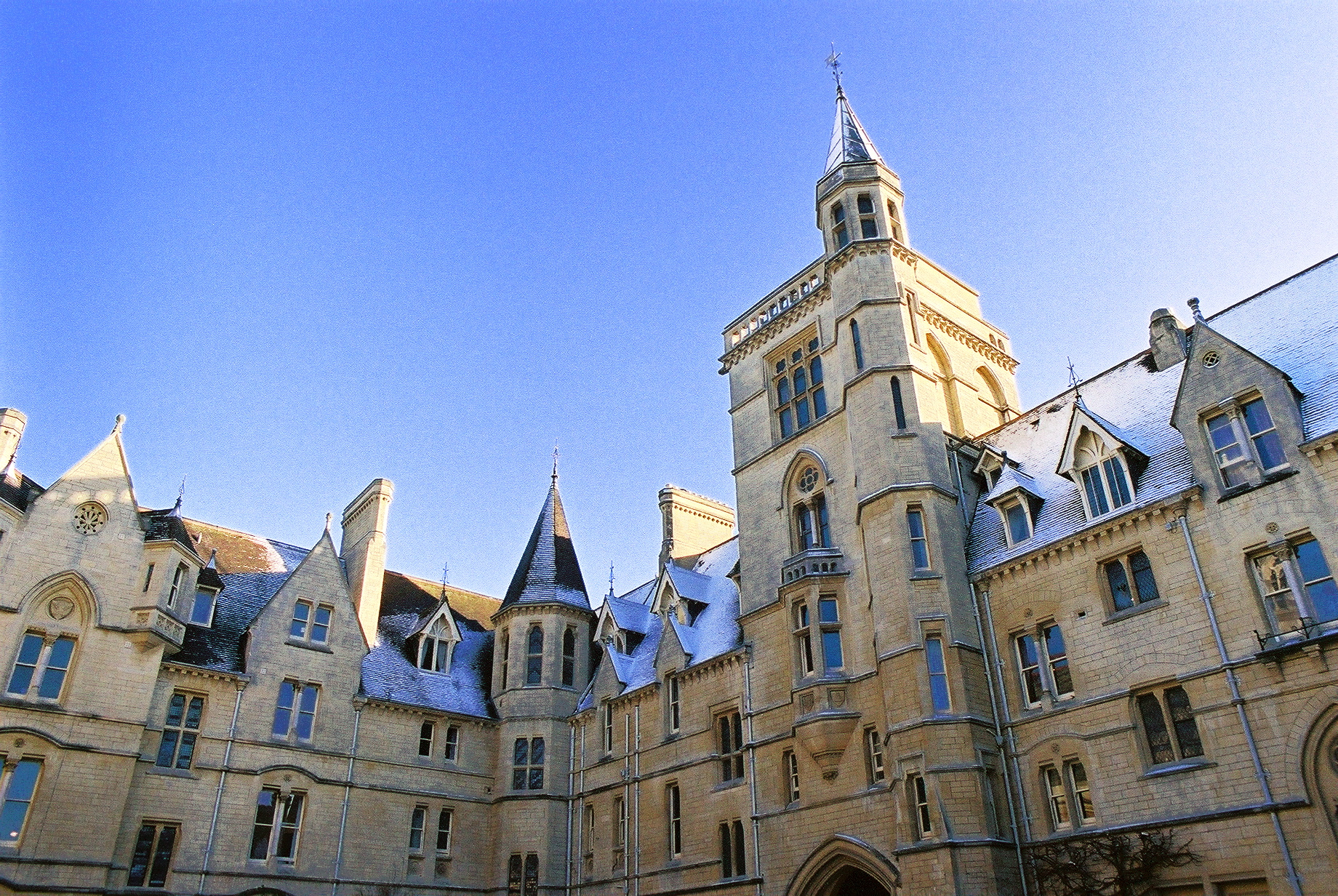
Balliol College, Oxford, where Lang was an undergraduate between 1882 and 1886

Lang started at Balliol in October 1882. In his first term he successfully sat for the Brackenbury Scholarship, described by his biographer John Gilbert Lockhart as "the Blue Ribbon of history scholarship at any University of the British Isles". In February 1883 his first speech at the Oxford Union, against the disestablishment of the Church of Scotland, was warmly received; the chairman likened his oratory to that of the Ancient Greek statesman, Demosthenes. He became the Union's president in the Trinity term of 1883, and the following year was a co-founder of the Oxford University Dramatic Society (OUDS).

Although Lang considered himself forward-thinking, he joined and became secretary of the Canning Club, the university's principal Conservative society. His contemporary Robert Cecil recorded that Lang's "progressive" opinions were somewhat frowned upon by traditional Tories, who nevertheless respected his ability. Lang later assisted in the founding of the University settlement of Toynbee Hall, a mission to help the poor in the East End of London. He had been first drawn to this work in 1883, after listening to a sermon in St Mary's Church, Oxford, by Samuel Augustus Barnett, Vicar of St Jude's, Whitechapel. Barnett became the settlement's first leader, while Lang became one of its first undergraduate secretaries. He spent so much time on these duties that he was chided by the Master of Balliol, Benjamin Jowett, for neglecting his studies. In 1886 Lang graduated with first-class honours in History; in October he failed to secure a Fellowship of All Souls College, blaming his poor early scholastic training in Glasgow.

=== Towards ordination ===
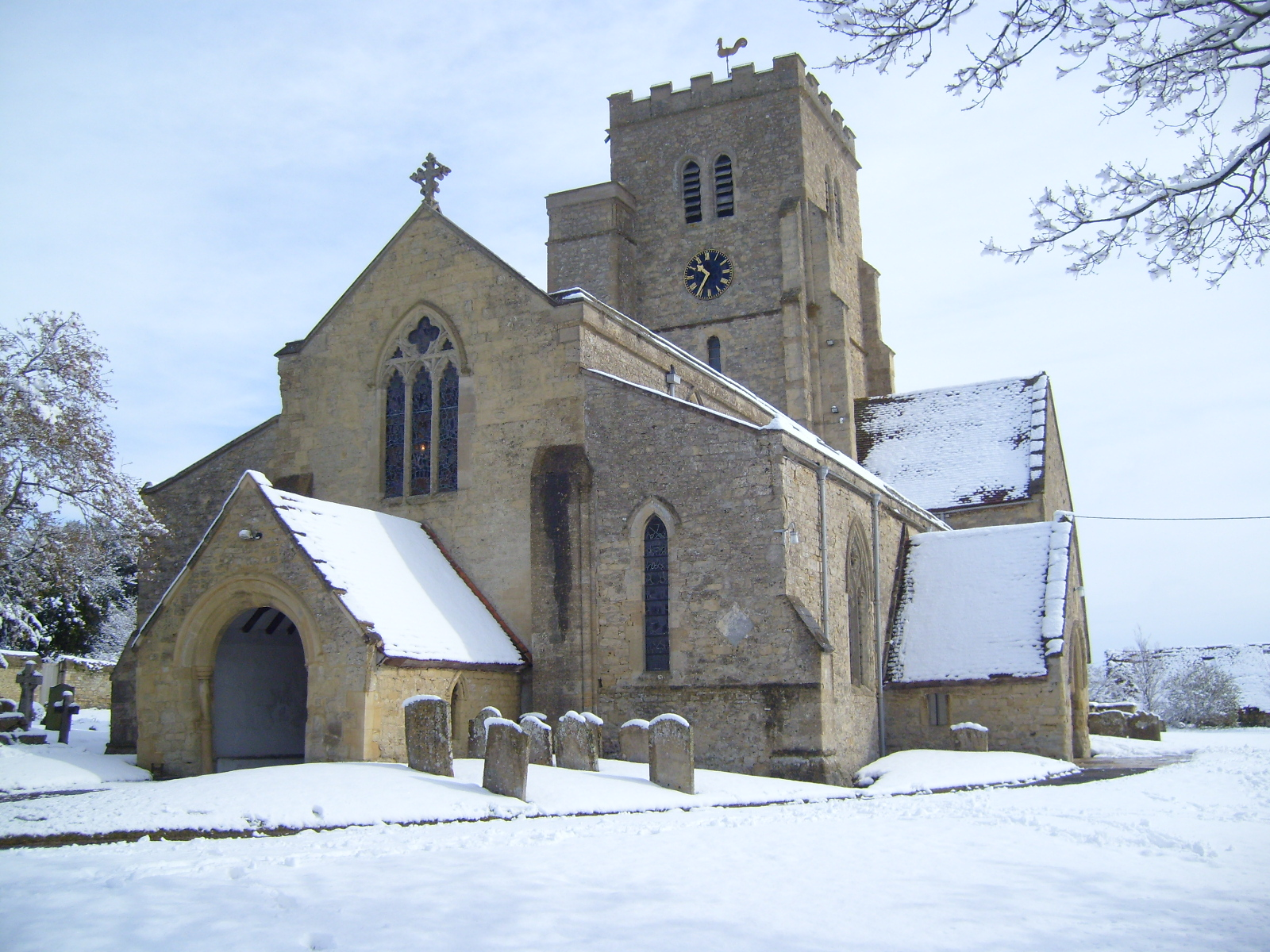
The Church of All Saints, Cuddesdon, scene of Lang's call to ordination in 1889

Lang's career ambition from early in life was to practise law, enter politics and then take office in some future Conservative administration. In 1887 he began his studies for the English Bar, working in the London chambers of W.S. Robson, a future Attorney General, whose "vehement radicalism was an admirable stimulus and corrective to [Lang's] liberal Conservatism". During these years Lang was largely aloof from religion, but continued churchgoing out of what he termed "hereditary respect". He attended services at the nonconformist City Temple church and sometimes went to St Paul's Cathedral. Of his life at that time he said: "I must confess that I played sometimes with those external temptations that our Christian London flaunts in the face of its young men."

In October 1888 Lang was elected to an All Souls Fellowship, and began to divide his time between London and Oxford. Some of his Oxford friends were training for ordination and Lang was often drawn into their discussions. Eventually the question entered Lang's mind: "Why shouldn't you be ordained?" The thought persisted, and one Sunday evening in early 1889, after a visit to the theological college at Cuddesdon in Oxfordshire, Lang attended evening service at Cuddesdon parish church. By his own account, during the sermon he was gripped by "a masterful inward voice" which told him "You are wanted. You are called. You must obey." He immediately severed his connection with the Bar, renounced his political ambitions and applied for a place at Cuddesdon College. With the help of an All Souls contact, the essential step of his confirmation into the Church of England was supervised by the Bishop of Lincoln, Edward King. Lang's decision to become an Anglican and seek ordination disappointed his Presbyterian father, who nevertheless wrote to his son: "What you think, prayerfully and solemnly, you ought to do – you must do – we will accept."

== Early ministry ==
=== Leeds ===
After a year's study at Cuddesdon, Lang was ordained as deacon. He rejected an offer of the chaplaincy of All Souls as he wanted to be "up and doing" in a tough parish. Lang identified with the Anglo-Catholic tradition of the Church of England, in part, he admitted, as a reaction against his evangelical upbringing in the Church of Scotland. His sympathies lay with the progressive wing of Anglo-Catholicism represented by the Lux Mundi essays, published in 1888 by a group of forward-looking Oxford theologians. Among these was Edward Stuart Talbot, Warden of Keble, who in 1888 had become Vicar of Leeds Parish Church. Talbot had contributed the essay entitled "The Preparation for History in Christ" in Lux Mundi. On ordination Lang eagerly accepted the offer of a curacy under Talbot, and arrived in Leeds in late 1890.

Leeds Parish Church, rebuilt and reconsecrated in 1841 after an elaborate ceremony, was of almost cathedral size, the centre of a huge parish ministered by many curates. Lang's district was the Kirkgate, one of the poorest areas, many of whose 2,000 inhabitants were prostitutes. Lang and his fellow curates fashioned a clergy house from a derelict public house. He later moved next door, into a condemned property which became his home for his remaining service in Leeds. In addition to his normal parish duties, Lang acted temporarily as Principal of the Clergy School, was chaplain to Leeds Infirmary, and took charge of a men's club of around a hundred members. On 24 May 1891 he was ordained to full priesthood.

Lang continued to visit Oxford when time allowed and on a visit to All Souls in June 1893 he was offered the post of Dean of Divinity at Magdalen College. Other offers were open to him; the Bishop of Newcastle wished to appoint him vicar of the cathedral church in Newcastle and Benjamin Jowett wished him to return to Balliol as a tutor in theology. Lang chose Magdalen; the idea of being in charge of young men who might in the future achieve positions of responsibility was attractive to him and, in October 1893, with many regrets, he left Leeds.

=== Magdalen College ===
As Magdalen's Dean of Divinity (college chaplain), Lang had pastoral duties with the college's undergraduates and responsibility for the chapel and its choir. Lang was delighted with this latter obligation; his concern for the purity of the choir's sound led him to request that visitors "join in the service silently". In 1894 Lang was asked to add to his workload by acting as Vicar of the University Church of St Mary the Virgin, where John Henry Newman had begun his Oxford ministry in 1828. The church had almost ceased to function when Lang took it over, but he revived regular services, chose preachers with care and slowly rebuilt the congregation. In December 1895 he was offered the post of Vicar of Portsea, a large parish within Portsmouth on the south coast, but he was not ready to leave Oxford and refused. Some months later he had further thoughts; the strain of his dual appointment in Oxford was beginning to tell and, he claimed, "the thought of this great parish [of Portsea] and work going a-begging troubled my conscience." After discovering that the Portsea offer was still open, he decided to accept, though with some misgiving.

=== Portsea ===
Portsea, covering much of the town of Portsmouth, was a dockside parish of around 40,000 inhabitants with a mixture of housing ranging from neat terraces to squalid slums. The large, recently rebuilt St Mary's church held more than 2,000 people. Lang arrived in June 1896 to lead a team of more than a dozen curates serving the five districts of the parish. He quickly resumed the kind of urban parish work he had carried out in Leeds; he founded a Sunday afternoon men's conference with 300 men, and supervised the construction of a large conference hall as a centre for parish activities. He also pioneered the establishment of parochial church councils long before they were given legal status in 1919. Outside his normal parish duties, Lang served as chaplain to the local prison, and became acting chaplain to the 2nd Hampshire Royal Artillery Volunteer Corps.

Lang's relationship with his curates was generally formal. They were aware of his ambition and felt that he sometimes spent too much time on his outside interests such as his All Souls Fellowship, but were nevertheless impressed by his efficiency and his powers of oratory. The Church historian Adrian Hastings singles out Portsea under Lang as an example of "extremely disciplined pastoral professionalism". Lang may have realised that he was destined for high office; he is reported to have practised the signature "Cosmo Cantuar" during a relaxed discussion with his curates ("Cantuar" is part of the Archbishop of Canterbury's formal signature). In January 1898 he was invited by Queen Victoria to preach at Osborne House, her Isle of Wight home. Afterwards he talked with the Queen who, Lang records, suggested that he should marry. Lang replied that he could not afford to as his curates cost too much. He added: "If a curate proves unsatisfactory I can get rid of him. A wife is a fixture." He was summoned on several more occasions and in the following January was appointed an Honorary Chaplain to the Queen. These visits to Osborne were the start of a close association with the Royal Family which lasted for the rest of Lang's life. As one of the Queen's chaplains, he assisted in the funeral arrangements after her death in January 1901.

== Bishop and canon ==
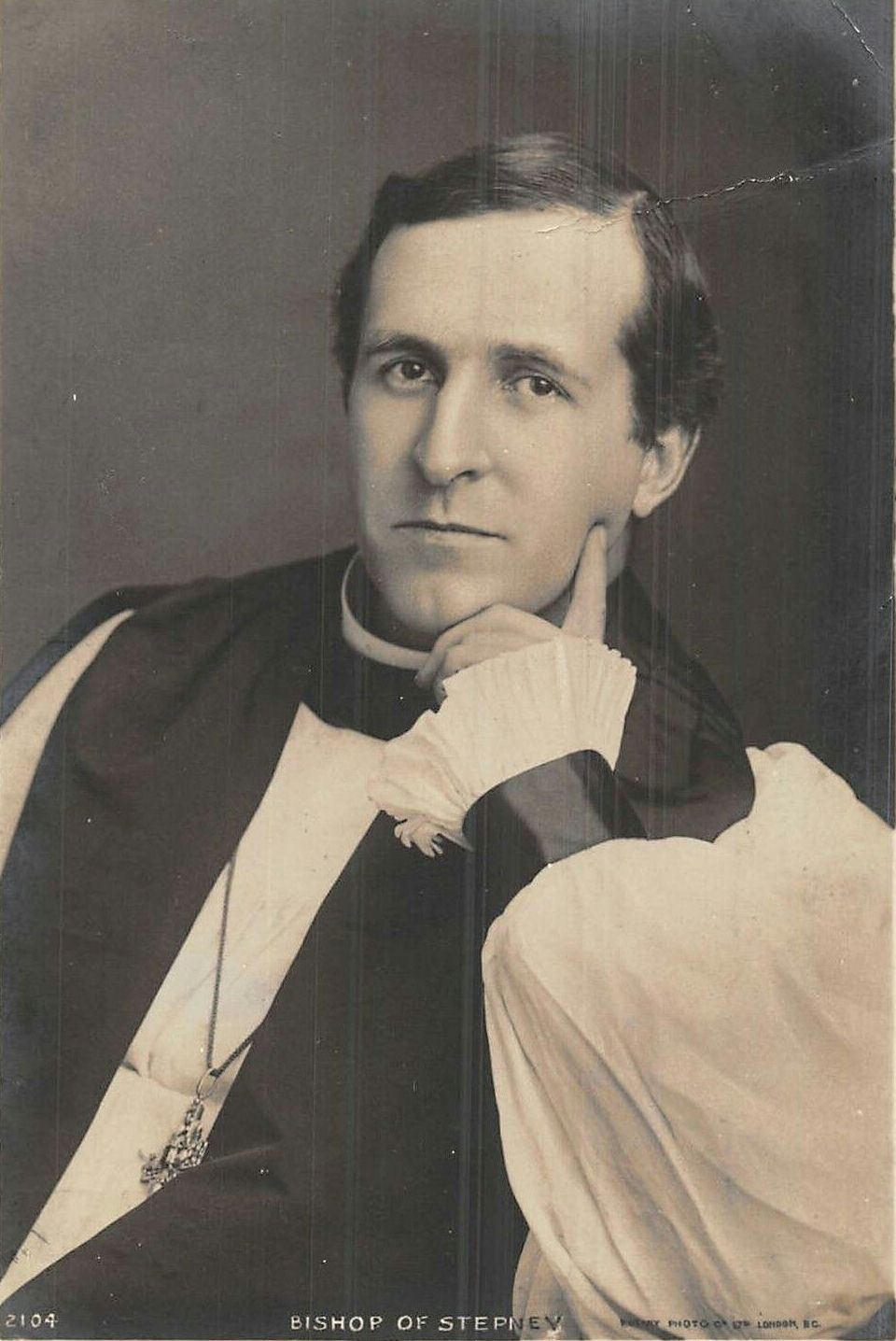
Lang as Bishop of Stepney, photograph

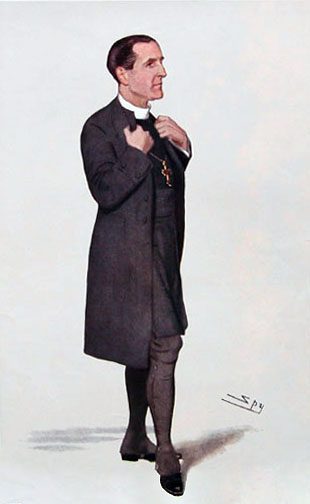
Lang as Bishop of Stepney, caricature by Leslie Ward, 1906

In March 1901 Lang was appointed suffragan Bishop of Stepney and a canon of St Paul's Cathedral. These appointments reflected his growing reputation and recognised his successful ministry in working-class parishes. He was consecrated bishop by the Archbishop of Canterbury, Frederick Temple, in St Paul's Cathedral, on 1 May; his time would subsequently be divided between his work in the Stepney region and his duties at St Paul's. The University of Oxford honoured him with the degree of Doctor of Divinity in late May 1901.

=== Stepney ===
Lang's region of Stepney within the Diocese of London extended over the whole area generally known as London's East End, with two million people in more than 200 parishes. Almost all were poor, and housed in overcrowded and insanitary conditions. Lang knew something of the area from his undergraduate activities at Toynbee Hall, and his conscience was troubled by the squalor that he saw as he travelled around the district, usually by bus and tram.

Lang's liberal conservatism enabled him to associate easily with Socialist leaders such as Will Crooks and George Lansbury, successive mayors of Poplar; he was responsible for bringing the latter back to regular communion in the Church. In 1905 he and Lansbury joined the Central London Unemployed Body, set up by the government to tackle the region's unemployment problems. That same year Lang took as his personal assistant a young Cambridge graduate and clergyman's son, Dick Sheppard, who became a close friend and confidante. Sheppard was eventually ordained, becoming a radical clergyman and founder of the Peace Pledge Union. Lang believed that socialism was a growing force in British life, and at a Church Congress in Great Yarmouth in 1907 he speculated on how the Church should respond to this. His remarks reached The New York Times, which warned that modern socialism was often equated with unrest, that "the cry of the demagogue is in the air" and that the Church should not heed this cry.

Much of the work in the district was supported by the East London Church Fund, established in 1880 to provide for additional clergy and lay workers in the poorest districts. Lang preached in wealthier parishes throughout Southern England, and urged his listeners to contribute to the Fund. He resumed his ministry to the army when, in 1907, he was appointed Honorary Chaplain to the City of London Imperial Yeomanry (Rough Riders). He became chairman of the Church of England Men's Society (CEMS), which had been founded in 1899 by the merger of numerous organisations doing the same work. Initially he found it "a very sickly infant", but under his leadership it expanded rapidly, and soon had over 20,000 members in 600 branches. Later he became critical of the Church's failure to use this movement effectively, calling it one of the Church's lost opportunities.

=== St Paul's Cathedral ===
Lang's appointment as a canon of St Paul's Cathedral required him to spend three months annually as the canon in residence, with administrative and preaching duties. Following his appointment as canon, he was also appointed treasurer of the cathedral. His preaching on Sunday afternoons caught the attention of William Temple, Lang's future successor at both York and Canterbury, who was then an undergraduate at Oxford. Temple observed that, in contrast to the Bishop of London's sermons, listening to Lang brought on an intellectual rather than emotional pleasure: "I can remember all his points, just because their connexion is inevitable.... And for me, there is no doubt that this is the more edifying by far." Lang was a member of the cathedral's governing body, the Dean and Chapter, and was responsible for the organisation of special occasions, such as the service of thanksgiving for King Edward VII's recovery from appendicitis in July 1902.

== Archbishop of York ==
Lang in 1910, a youthful-looking archbishop

Lang after World War I. The alteration to his appearance was caused by alopecia and stress.

=== Appointment ===
In late 1908 Lang was informed of his election as Bishop of Montreal. Letters from the Governor General of Canada and the Canadian High Commissioner urged him to accept, but the Archbishop of Canterbury asked him to refuse. A few weeks later a letter from H. H. Asquith, the prime minister, informed Lang that he had been nominated Archbishop of York. Lang was only 44 years old, and had no experience as a diocesan bishop. On the issue of age, the Church Times believed that Asquith deliberately recommended the youngest bishop available, after strong political lobbying for the appointment of the elderly Bishop of Hereford, John Percival. Such a promotion for a suffragan, and within so short a period after ordination, was without recent precedent in the Church of England. Lang's friend Hensley Henson, a future Bishop of Durham, wrote: "I am, of course, surprised that you go straight to an archbishopric [...] But you are too meteoric for precedent." The appointment was generally well received, although the Protestant Truth Society sought in vain to prevent its confirmation. Strong opponents of Anglo-Catholic practices, they maintained that as Bishop of Stepney Lang had "connived at and encouraged flagrant breaking of the law relating to church ritual".

=== First years ===
Lang's election to York was confirmed on 20 January and he was enthroned at York Minster on 25 January 1909. In 18 years since ordination he had risen to the second-highest position in the Church of England. In addition to his diocesan responsibilities for York itself, he became head of the entire Northern Province, and a member of the House of Lords. Believing that the Diocese of York was too large, he proposed reducing it by forming a new Diocese of Sheffield, which after several years' work was inaugurated in 1914. In the years following his appointment, Lang spoke out on a range of social and economic issues, and in support of improved working conditions. After taking his seat in the House of Lords in February 1909, he made his maiden speech in November in the debate on the controversial People's Budget, advising the Lords against their intention to reject this measure. He cast his first Lords vote against rejection, because he was "deeply convinced of the unwisdom of the course the Lords proposed to take". Although his speech was received with respect, Lang's stance was politely reproved by the leading Conservative peer Lord Curzon.

Despite this socially progressive stance, Lang's political instincts remained conservative. He voted against the 1914 Irish Home Rule Bill and opposed liberalisation of the divorce laws. After playing a prominent role in King George V's coronation in 1911, Lang became increasingly close to the Royal Family, an association which drew the comment that he was "more courtier than cleric". His love of ceremony, and concern for how an archbishop should look and live, began to obscure other aspects of his ministry; rather than assuming the role of the people's prelate he began, in the words of his biographer Alan Wilkinson, to act as a "prince of the church".

=== First World War ===
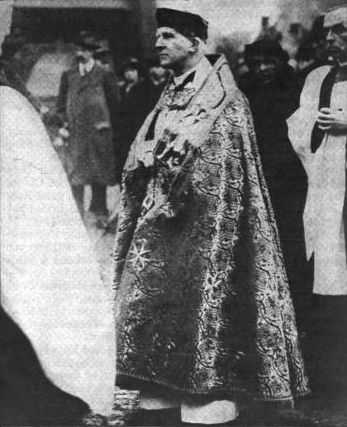
Lang on 11 January 1918, celebrating the outcome of the Battle of Jerusalem

When war broke out in August 1914, Lang concluded that the conflict was righteous, and that younger clergy should be encouraged to serve as military chaplains, although it was not their duty to fight. He thereafter was active in recruiting campaigns throughout his province. At a meeting in York in November 1914 he caused offence when he spoke out against excessive anti-German propaganda, and recalled a "sacred memory" of the Kaiser kneeling with King Edward VII at the bier of Queen Victoria. These remarks, perceived as pro-German, produced what Lang termed "a perfect hail of denunciation". The strain of this period, coupled with the onset of alopecia, drastically altered Lang's relatively youthful appearance to that of a bald and elderly-looking man. His friends were shocked; the king, meeting him on the Royal train, apparently burst into guffaws of laughter.

Public hostility against Lang was slow to subside, re-emerging from time to time throughout the war. Lang continued his contribution to the war effort, paying visits to the Grand Fleet and to the Western Front. He applied all his organisational skills to the Archbishop of Canterbury's National Mission of Repentance and Hope, an initiative designed to renew Christian faith nationwide, but it failed to make a significant impact.

As a result of the Battle of Jerusalem of December 1917, the British Empire's Egyptian Expeditionary Force captured the Holy City, bringing it under Christian control for the first time since the Crusades. As Prelate of the Venerable Order of Saint John, Lang led a service of celebration on 11 January 1918 at the Order's Grand Priory Church, Clerkenwell. He explained that it was 917 years since the Order's hospital had been founded in Jerusalem, and 730 years since they were driven out by Saladin. "London is the city of the Empire's commerce, but Jerusalem is the city of the soul, and it is particularly fitting that British Armies should have delivered it out of the hands of the infidel."

Early in 1918, at the invitation of the Episcopal Church of the United States, he made a goodwill visit to America, praising the extent and willingness of America's participation in the war. The Westminster Gazette called this "one of the most moving and memorable visits ever paid by an Englishman [sic] to the United States".

=== Post-war years ===
After the war, Lang's primary cause was that of church unity. In 1920, as chairman of the Reunion Committee at the Sixth Lambeth Conference, he promoted an "Appeal to all Christian People", described by Hastings as "one of the rare historical documents that does not get forgotten with the years". It was unanimously adopted as the Conference's Resolution 9, and ended: "We [...] ask that all should unite in a new and great endeavour to recover and to manifest to the world the unity of the Body of Christ for which He prayed." Despite initial warmth from the English Free Churches, little could be achieved in terms of practical union between episcopal and non-episcopal churches, and the initiative was allowed to lapse. Historically, the Appeal is considered the starting-point for the more successful ecumenical efforts of later generations.

Lang was supportive of the Malines Conversations of 1921–26, though not directly involved. These were informal meetings between leading British Anglo-Catholics and reform-minded European Roman Catholics, exploring the possibility of reuniting the Anglican and Roman communions. Although the discussions had the blessing of Randall Davidson, the Archbishop of Canterbury, many Anglican evangelicals were alarmed by them. Ultimately, the talks foundered on the entrenched opposition of the Catholic ultramontanes. A by-product of these conversations may have been the awakening of opposition to the revision of the Anglican Prayer Book. The focus of this revision, which Lang supported, was to make concessions to Anglo-Catholic rituals and practices in the Anglican service. The new Prayer Book was overwhelmingly approved by the Church's main legislative body, the Church Assembly, and by the House of Lords. Partly through the advocacy of the fervently evangelical Home Secretary, Sir William Joynson-Hicks, the revision was twice defeated in the House of Commons, in December 1927 by 238 votes to 205 and, in June 1928, by 266 to 220. Lang was deeply disappointed, writing that "the gusts of Protestant convictions, suspicions, fears [and] prejudices swept through the House, and ultimately prevailed."

On 26 April 1923, George V awarded Lang the Royal Victorian Chain, an honour in the personal gift of the Sovereign After the marriage of Prince Albert, Duke of York (later George VI) in 1923, Lang formed a friendship with his Duchess (later Queen Elizabeth The Queen Mother) which lasted for the rest of Lang's life. In 1926, he baptised Princess Elizabeth (later Elizabeth II) in the private chapel of Buckingham Palace. In January 1927, Lang took centre-stage in the elaborate ceremonies which marked the 1,300th anniversary of the founding of York Minster.

== Archbishop of Canterbury ==
=== In office ===
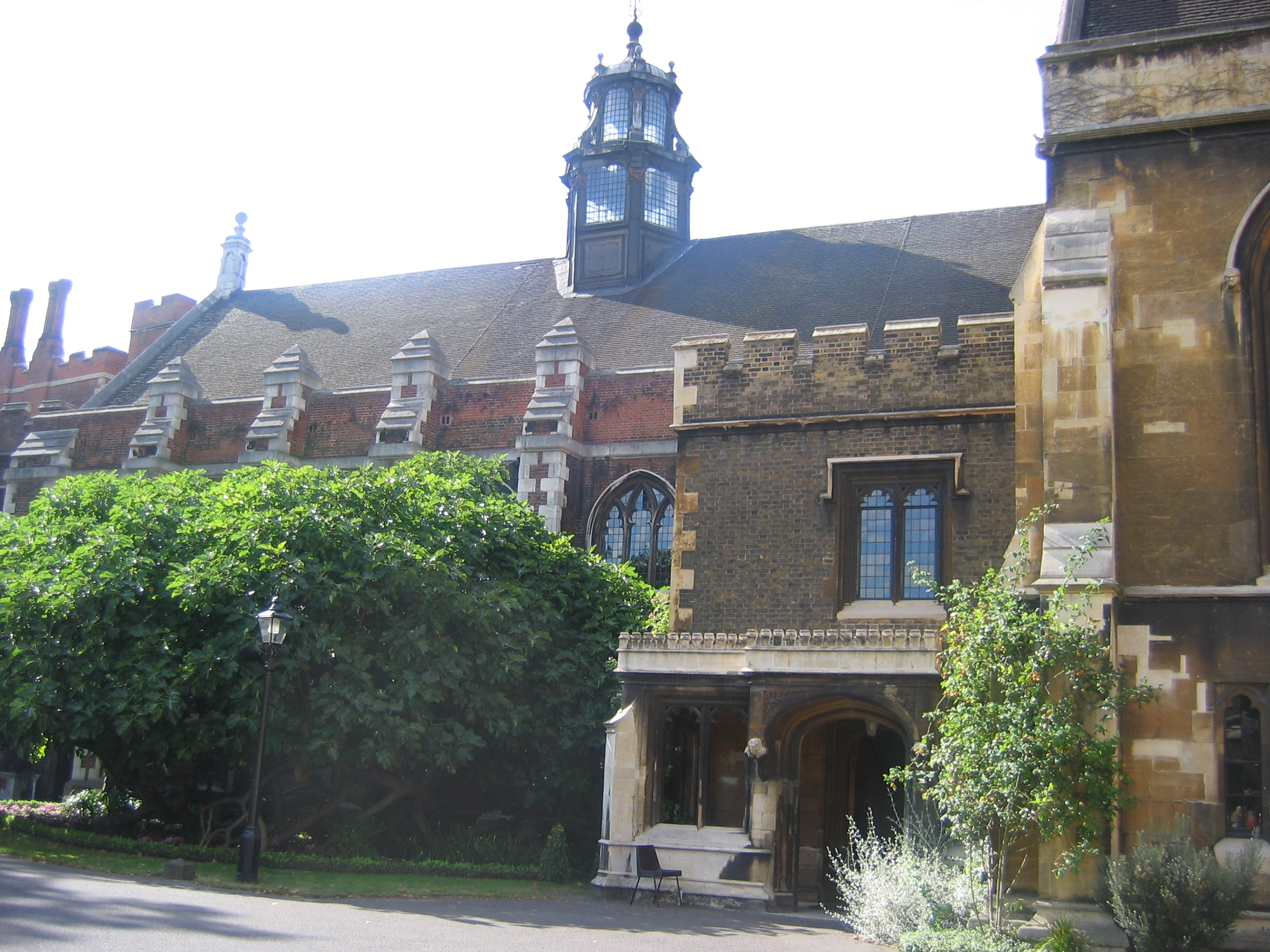
Lambeth Palace, the official residence of the Archbishop of Canterbury in London

Archbishop Davidson resigned in July 1928, believed to have been the first Archbishop of Canterbury ever to retire voluntarily. On 26 July Lang was notified by the Prime Minister, Stanley Baldwin, that he would be the successor; William Temple would succeed Lang at York. Lang was enthroned as the new Archbishop of Canterbury on 4 December 1928, the first bachelor to hold the appointment in 150 years. A contemporary Time magazine article described Lang as "forthright and voluble" and as looking "like George Washington". Lang's first three years at Canterbury were marked by intermittent illnesses, which required periods of convalescence away from his duties. After 1932, he enjoyed good health for the rest of his life.

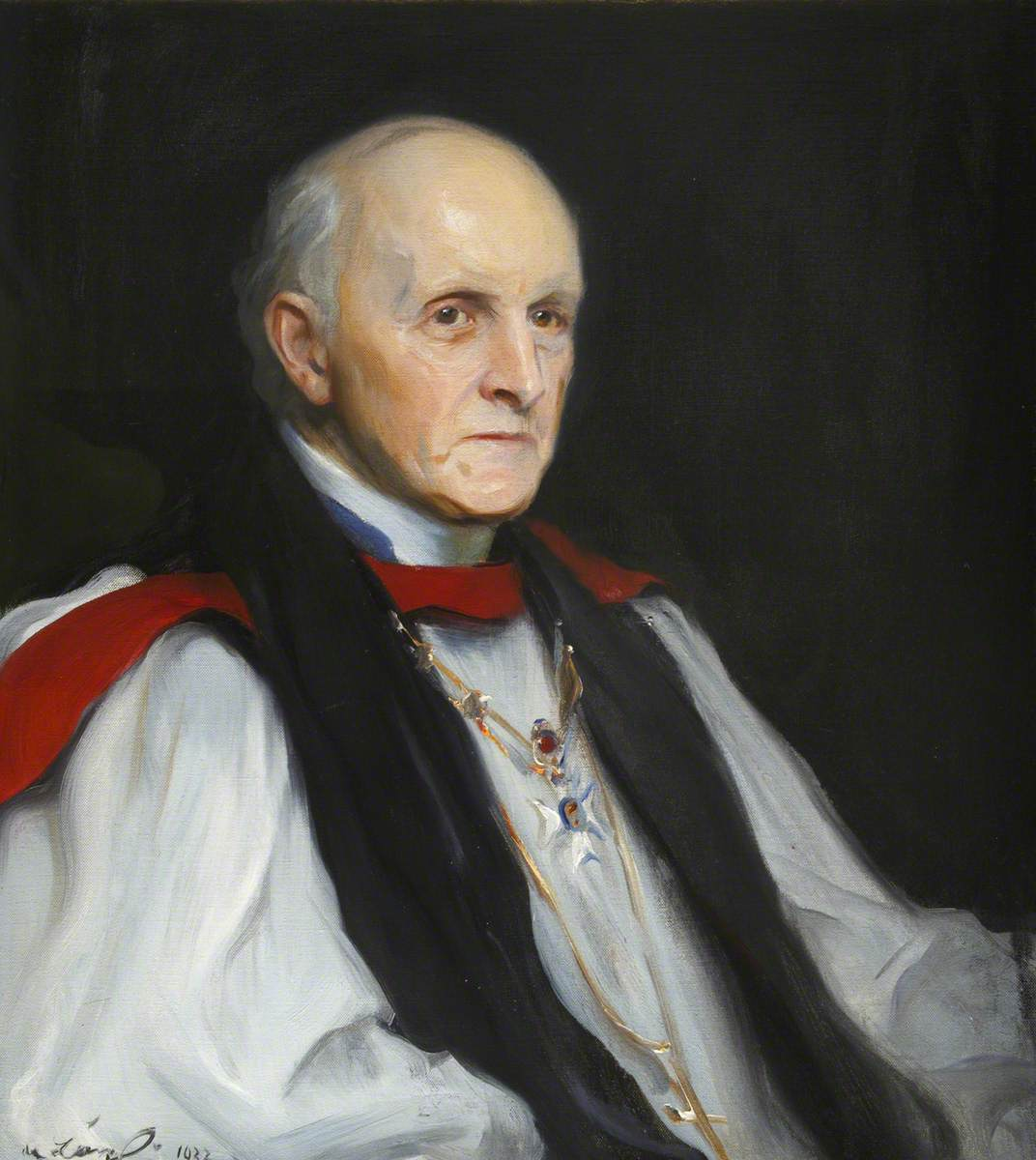
Portrait of Archbishop Lang by Philip de László, 1932

Lang avoided continuation of the Prayer Book controversy of 1928 by allowing the parliamentary process to lapse. He then authorised a statement permitting use of the rejected Book locally if the parochial church council gave approval. The issue remained dormant for the rest of Lang's tenure at Canterbury. He led the 1930 Lambeth Conference, where further progress was made in improving relations with the Eastern Orthodox Churches and the Old Catholics, although again no agreement could be reached with the non-episcopal Free Churches. On an issue of greater concern to ordinary people, the Conference gave limited approval, for the first time, to the use of contraceptive devices, an issue in which Lang had no interest. Through the 1930s Lang continued to work for Church unity. In 1933 the Church of England assembly formed a Council on Foreign Relations and, in the following years, numerous exchange visits with Orthodox delegations took place, a process only halted by the outbreak of war. Lang's 1939 visit to the Ecumenical Patriarch of Constantinople is regarded as the high point of his ecumenical record. George Bell, Bishop of Chichester, maintained that no one in the Anglican Communion did more than Lang to promote the unity movement.

In 1937 the Oxford Conference on Church and Society, which later gave birth to the World Council of Churches, produced what was according to the church historian Adrian Hastings "the most serious approach to the problems of society that the Church had yet managed", but without Lang's close involvement. By this time Lang's identification with the poor had largely vanished, as had his interest in social reform. In the Church Assembly his closest ally was the aristocratic Lord Hugh Cecil; Hastings maintains that the Church of England in the 1930s was controlled "less by Lang and Temple in tandem than by Lang and Hugh Cecil". Lang got on well with Hewlett Johnson, the pro-communist priest who was appointed Dean of Canterbury in 1931.

=== International and domestic politics ===
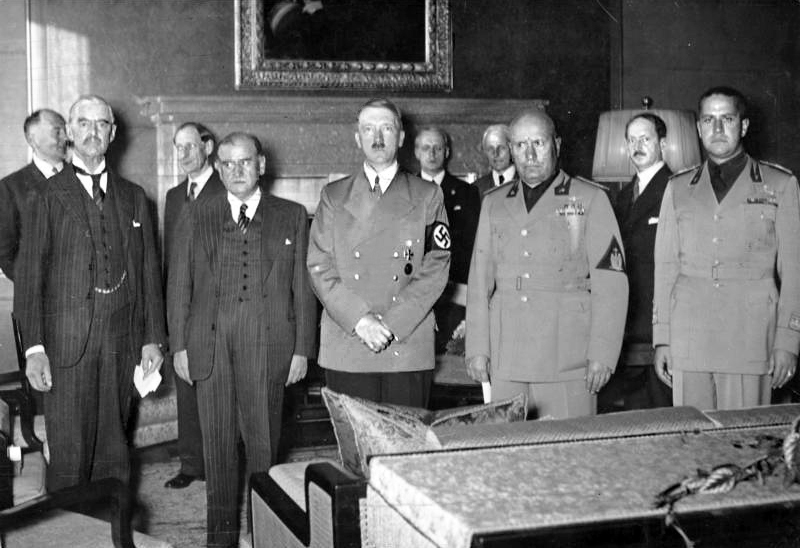
The signatories to the Munich Agreement, September 1938. Lang hailed the Agreement, and called for a day of thanksgiving to God.

Lang often spoke in the House of Lords about the treatment of Russian Christians in the Soviet Union. He also denounced the anti-semitic policies of the Nazi German government, and he took private steps to help European Jews. In 1938 he was instrumental in saving 60 rabbis from Burgenland in Austria, who would have been murdered by the Nazis had the archbishop not obtained them entry visas to England.

In 1933, having commented on the "noble task" of assisting India towards independence, he was appointed to the Joint Committee on the Indian Constitution. He condemned the Italian invasion of Abyssinia in 1935, appealing for medical supplies to be sent to the Abyssinian troops. As the threat of war increased later in the decade, Lang became a strong supporter of the government's policy of appeasing the European dictators, declaring the Sunday after the Munich Agreement of September 1938 to be a day of thanksgivings for the "sudden lifting of this cloud". Earlier that year, contrary to his former stance, he had supported the Anglo-Italian agreement to recognise the conquest of Abyssinia, because he believed that "an increase of appeasement" was necessary to avoid the threat of war. Lang also backed the government's non-intervention policy in regard to the Spanish Civil War, saying that there were no clear issues that required the taking of sides. He described the bombing of Guernica by the Germans and the Italians, on 26 April 1937, as "deplorable and shocking". In October 1937 Lang's condemnation of Imperial Japanese Army actions in China provoked hostile scrutiny by the Japanese authorities of the Anglican Church in Japan, and caused some in that church's leadership to publicly disassociate themselves from the Church of England.

On the domestic front, Lang supported campaigns for the abolition of the death penalty. He upheld the right of the Church to refuse the remarriage of divorced persons within its buildings, but he did not directly oppose A.P. Herbert's Matrimonial Causes Bill of 1937, which liberalised the divorce laws – Lang believed "it was no longer possible to impose the full Christian standard by law on a largely non-Christian population." He drew criticism for his opposition to the reform of the ancient tithe system, whereby many farmers paid a proportion of their income to the Church; in the subsequent "Tithe Wars", demonstrators at Ashford, Kent ceremonially burned his effigy. Near the end of his term in office Lang led a deputation from several church groups to the Ministry of Education, to present a five-point plan for the teaching of religion in state schools. These points were eventually embodied in the Education Act 1944.

=== Abdication crisis ===
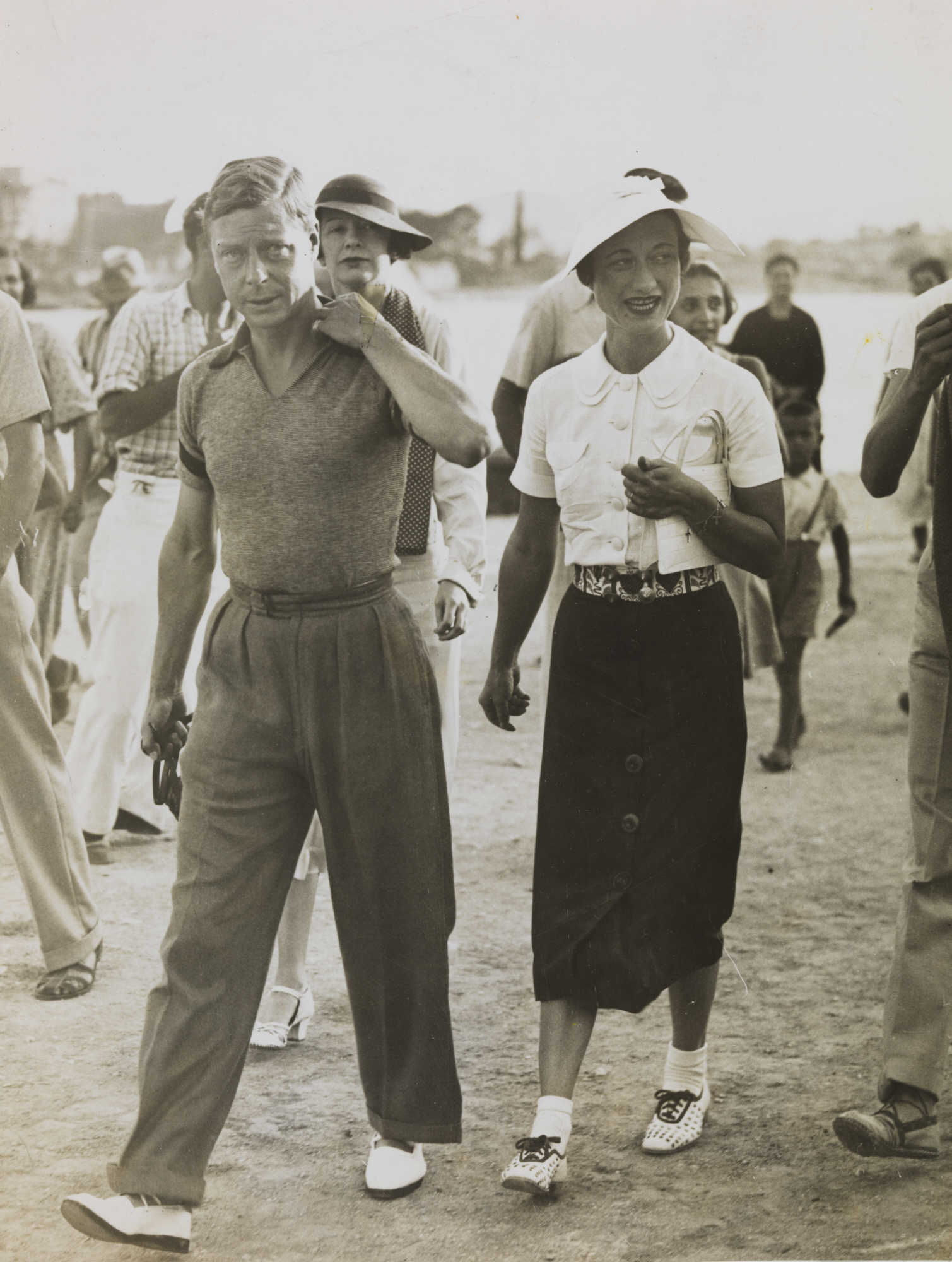
Edward VIII on holiday in Yugoslavia with Wallis Simpson, 1936

Lang was responsible for drafting King George V's silver jubilee broadcast message in 1935, and the King's last two Christmas messages. This closeness to the throne was not maintained when the King died in January 1936 and was succeeded by his son, Edward VIII. The new king was wary of Lang, whom he had once admired. Edward now found Lang to be "rather [...] accustomed to the company of princes and statesmen, more interested in the pursuit of prestige and power than the abstractions of the human soul".

Lang believed that, as Prince of Wales, Edward had not always been wise in his choice of friends and acquaintances, whose standards Lang was later to condemn as "alien to all the best instincts and traditions of his people". The archbishop had been aware for some time of the King's relationship with the American Wallis Simpson, then married to her second husband Ernest Simpson. In mid-1936 it became clear that the King intended to marry Simpson either before or shortly after his impending coronation, depending on the timing of her divorce from her husband. Lang agonised over whether he could, with good conscience, administer the Coronation Oath to the King in such circumstances, bearing in mind the Church's teaching on marriage. He confided to his diary his hopes that circumstances might change, or that he might be able to persuade the King to reconsider his actions, but the King refused to meet him. Lang kept close contact with Queen Mary (the queen mother), Stanley Baldwin (the Prime Minister) and Alec Hardinge (the King's Private Secretary). The King believed that Lang's influence was strong, later recalling how from beginning to end he felt the archbishop's "shadowy, hovering presence" in the background. The King's view was accurate; Lang met with Baldwin on seven occasions during the crisis, an "unusual" frequency, and "made the most of his opportunities" to influence Baldwin into taking a firm line. (Note: In a letter of 25 November, marked "strictly confidential", Lang had written to Baldwin, in advance of the latter's meeting with the King later in the day; "The [press] leakage will soon become a flood and will burst the dam. Any announcement [...] of the kind you indicated to me [of the King's abdication] should be made as soon as possible. The announcement should appear as a free act [...] he [the King] must leave as soon as possible, it would be out of the question that he should remain".)

The matter became public knowledge on 2 December 1936 when Alfred Blunt, Bishop of Bradford, made an indirect comment on the King's "need for Divine Grace". By then the King had unalterably decided that he would abdicate rather than give up Wallis Simpson. All attempts to dissuade him failed, and on 11 December he gave up his throne in favour of his brother, George VI. Two days later Lang broadcast a speech, in which he said: "From God he received a high and sacred trust. Yet by his own will he has [...] surrendered the trust." The King's motive had been "a craving for private happiness" that he had sought "in a manner inconsistent with the Christian principles of marriage". The speech was widely condemned for its lack of charity towards the departed king and provoked the writer Gerald Bullett to publish a satirical punning rhyme: (Note: Cantuar is an abbreviation of Canterbury – Lang signed himself C. C., Cosmo Cantuar – but can be read as "cant you are". There are two versions of the rhyme. Lockhart, p. 406, and Don, p. 210, publish this one. McKibben has a different version of the last two lines: "Of charity how oddly scant you are! How Lang O Lord, how full of Cantuar!".)

My Lord Archbishop, what a scold you are!
And when your man is down, how bold you are!
Of Christian charity how scant you are!
And, auld Lang swine, how full of Cantuar!

Lang's most recent biographer considers that his broadcast was "arguably the biggest mistake of his primacy." The volume, and vehemence, of the reaction were immense. Alan Don, Lang's secretary and chaplain, wrote in his diary entry for Tuesday 15 December; "A perfect deluge of letters – the majority abusive and even vituperative", and went as far as to venture a rare criticism of his master; "C. C. was a little unfair to the poor King. I wish [he] had submitted his address to one of us beforehand but [...] he trusted his own judgement – which [...] [was] slightly at fault". (Note: As Lang's chaplain and secretary, Don had a ringside seat at the abdication crisis and, despite Lang's noted reticence, remained remarkably well-informed. His entry for 20 January 1936, some 10 months before the crisis became public knowledge, reads; "That the Prince of Wales would like to make way for the Duke of York and his charming Duchess, I do not doubt...")

Lang did not disguise his relief that the crisis was over. He wrote of George VI: "I was now sure that to the solemn words of the Coronation there would now be a sincere response." On 12 May 1937, Lang crowned George VI with full pomp in Westminster Abbey. It was the first coronation to be broadcast. Time magazine recorded: "All through the three-hour ceremony, the most important person there was not the King, his nobles or his ministers, but a hawk-nosed old gentleman with a cream-&-gold cope who stood on a dais as King George approached: The Rt. Hon. and Most Reverend Cosmo Gordon Lang, D.D.. Lord Archbishop of Canterbury, Primate of All England." Supposedly the archbishop fumbled with the Crown (Note: Lang was looking for a thread of red wool on the crown, which he had placed to allow him to align it with the centre of king's forehead, but it had been removed, in error, by an assistant.) but Lang himself was fully satisfied: "I can only be thankful to God's over-ruling Providence and trust that the Coronation may not be a mere dream of the past, but that its memories and lessons will not be forgotten." He also said of the Coronation: "It was in a sense the culminating day of my official life. Once I saw it was going well, I enjoyed every minute." "Thank God that is over!" said his chaplain, as they got into the car to leave. "Lumley, how can you say such a thing!" cried the archbishop. "I only wish it was beginning over again."

=== War ===
When the Second World War began in September 1939, Lang saw his main duty as the preservation of spiritual values during what he deemed to be an honourable conflict. He opposed strategies such as indiscriminate bombing, and on 21 December 1940, in a letter to The Times signed jointly with Temple and Cardinal Hinsley, Lang expressed support for the pope's Five Peace Points initiative. Lang was sympathetic to the Sword of the Spirit campaign, founded by Hinsley in 1940 to combat anti-democratic tendencies among Catholics. In May 1941 Lambeth Palace, Lang's London home, was hit by bombs and made uninhabitable.

After the Axis attack on the USSR in June 1941, Lang said that the Soviets must now be regarded as allies, without forgetting or condoning the excesses of the past. His relations with Winston Churchill, prime minister since May 1940, were difficult because "he [Churchill] knows nothing about the Church, its life, its needs or its personnel". There was therefore "uncertainty as to what motives or how much knowledge may determine his decisions [on Church matters]".

== Retirement and death ==
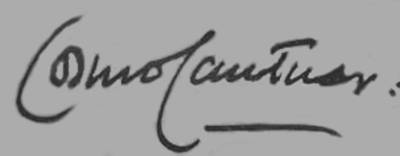
Lang's formal signature as Archbishop of Canterbury, "Cosmo Cantuar"

During 1941 Lang considered retirement. His main concern was that a Lambeth Conference – "perhaps the most fateful Lambeth Conference ever held" – would need to be called soon after the war. Lang felt that he would be too old to lead it and that he should make way for a younger man, preferably William Temple. On 27 November he informed the prime minister, Winston Churchill, of his decision to retire on 31 March 1942. His last official act in office, on 28 March, was the confirmation of Princess Elizabeth.

On his retirement Lang was raised to the peerage as Baron Lang of Lambeth, of Lambeth in the County of Surrey. He thus remained in the House of Lords, where he attended regularly and contributed to debates. He worried about money, despite a pension, a large grace and favour house at Kew, and some generous cash gifts from well-wishers. In 1943 he spoke in the House of Lords in support of the Beveridge Report on social insurance, and on 9 February 1944 he reiterated his earlier opposition to obliteration bombing. In October 1944 Lang was greatly distressed by the sudden death of William Temple, his successor at Canterbury, writing: "I don't like to think of the loss to the Church and Nation... But 'God knows and God reigns'."

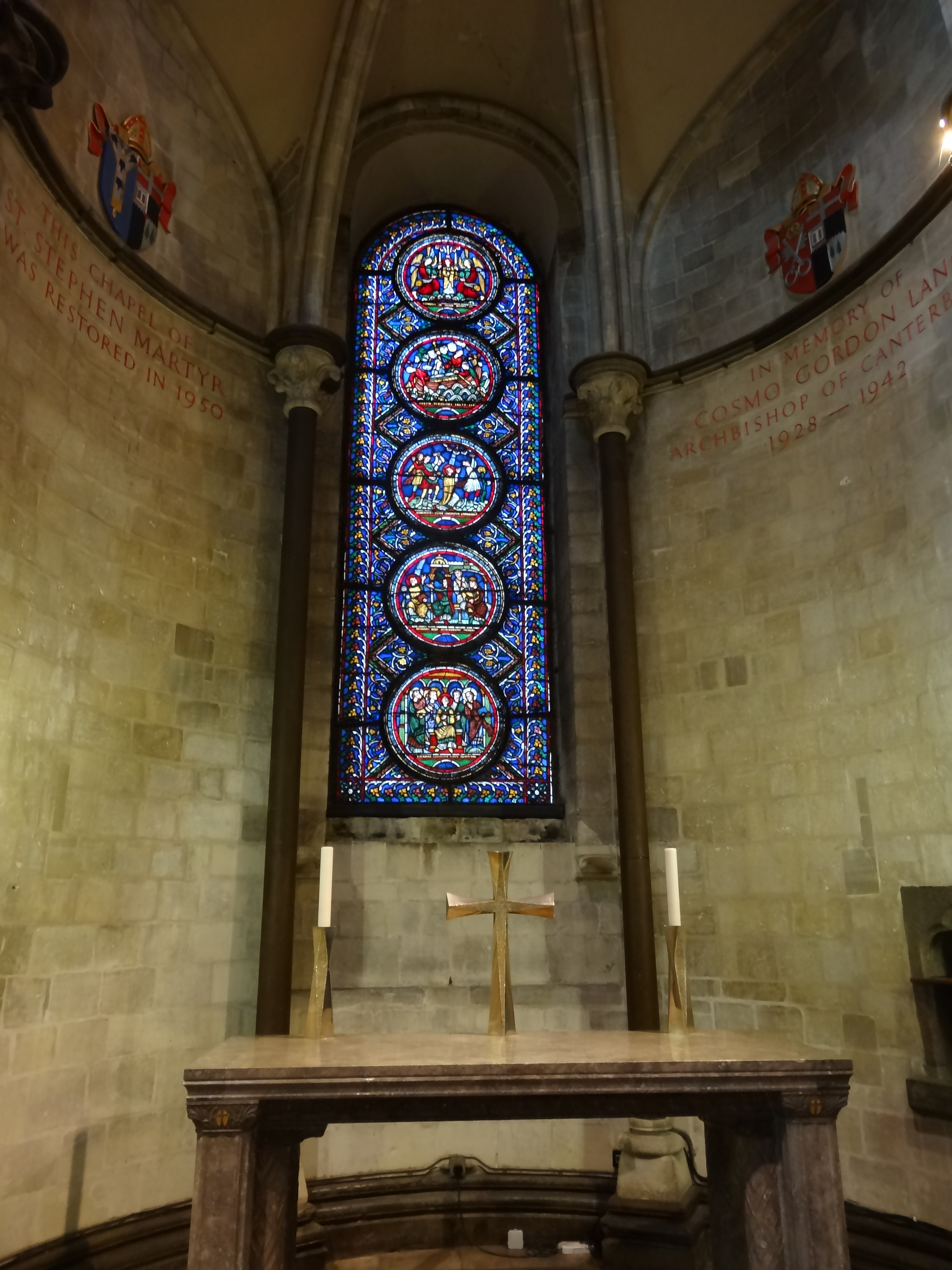
Chapel of St Stephen Martyr, Canterbury Cathedral, restored in Lang's memory in 1950

On 5 December 1945 Lang was due to speak in a Lords debate on conditions in Central Europe. On his way to Kew Gardens station to catch the London train, he collapsed and was taken to hospital, but was found to be dead on arrival. A post-mortem attributed the death to heart failure. In paying tribute the following day, Lord Addison said that Lang was "not only a great cleric but a great man... we have lost in him a Father in God." His body was cremated and the ashes taken to the Chapel of St Stephen Martyr, a side chapel at Canterbury Cathedral.

The probate value of Lang's estate was £29 541 (approximately £1,102,000 in 2025).

== Legacy ==
Although Lang was a bishop in England for longer than anyone else in the twentieth century, Hastings says that "of no other is it so hard to address his true significance". His biographer George Moyser said, "His lasting significance is questionable. He was immensely industrious, an exceptional administrator, and was well-connected to leading politicians and aristocrats. But his accomplishments as Archbishop of Canterbury were modest."

According to Lockhart he was a complex character in whom "a jangle of warring personalities ... never reached agreement among themselves." Lockhart writes that while Lang's many years of high office saw progress in the cause of Christian reunion, the mark he left on the Church was relatively small; many believed it could have been larger and deeper. While Lang's oratorical and administrative gifts were beyond doubt, Hastings nevertheless claims that as Archbishop of Canterbury, Lang displayed no effective leadership or guidance, turning away from reform and content to be the "final sentinel to the ancien régime". Wilkinson says that Lang dealt conscientiously with problems as they arose, but without any overall strategy.

In Hastings's view, Lang was probably more sympathetic to Rome than any other Church of England archbishop of modern times, responsible for a discreet catholicisation of the Church of England's practices. A small outward indication of this was his decision to use a cassock as everyday dress and to wear a mitre on formal occasions, the first archbishop since the English Reformation to do so. Lang believed that in relation to the supreme truths of the church, rituals and dress were of small account, but that if people's worship was assisted by such customs they should be allowed.

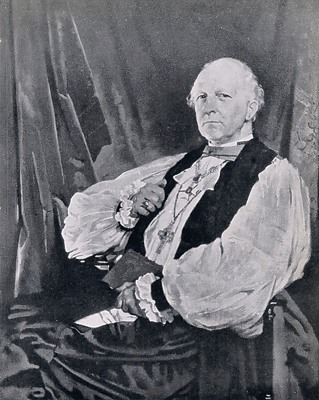
Lang by William Orpen: "proud, pompous and prelatical"

Despite Lang's long involvement with the poorest of society, after becoming Archbishop of York he increasingly detached himself from everyday life. The historian Tom Buchanan wrote that Lang's sympathy with ordinary people was replaced by "an upper class affectation and a delight in the high society in which his office allowed him to move". No archbishop has been as close as Lang to the Royal Family; a Channel Four television history of the British monarchy maintained that Lang "held a view of Christianity in which the monarchy, rather than the cross, stood centre stage as the symbol of the nation's faith". Successive generations of the Royal Family considered him their friend and honoured him. King George V appointed him to the largely ceremonial post of Lord High Almoner, and after the 1937 Coronation George VI created him a Knight Grand Cross of the Royal Victorian Order (GCVO), a rare honour which, like the Royal Victorian Chain, lay in the private gift of the Sovereign. A friend, commenting on the transformation of Lang's perspective, said of him: "He might have been Cardinal Wolsey or St Francis of Assisi, and he chose to be Cardinal Wolsey."

Lang also received numerous honorary doctorates from British universities. His portrait was painted many times; after sitting for Sir William Orpen in 1924, Lang reportedly remarked to Bishop Hensley Henson of Durham that the portrait showed him as "proud, prelatical and pompous". Henson's recorded reply was "To which of these epithets does Your Grace take exception?" (Note: Don, who saw the portrait at a Royal Academy exhibition in 1933, called it a "libellous, malicious caricature" while acknowledging that it was "splendidly painted [and] knock[ed] de László's effort into a cocked hat!")

At an early stage in his priesthood Lang decided to lead a celibate life. He had no objection to the institution of marriage, but felt that his own work would be hindered by domesticity. However, he enjoyed the company of women and confessed in 1928, after a visit to the Rowntree's chocolate factory, that the sight of the girls there had "stirred up all the instincts of my youth... very little subdued by the passage of years".

George Bell, the Bishop of Chichester who had earlier praised Lang's work for church unity, said that Lang's failure to take a lead after the Prayer Book rejection of 1928 meant that the Church of England had been unable to revise its forms of worship or take any effective control of its own affairs. Others have argued that Lang's laissez-faire approach to the Prayer Book controversy helped to defuse a potentially explosive situation and contributed to an eventual solution. Lang himself was gloomy about his legacy; he believed that since he had not led his country back into an Age of Faith, or marked his primacy with a great historical act, he had failed to live up to his own high standard. Others have judged him more charitably, praising his industry, his administrative ability and his devotion to duty.

== Bibliography ==
Lang wrote several books, including a novel of the Jacobite rising of 1745. This had its origins in stories told by Lang to the Magdalen College choirboys during his tenure as Magdalen's Dean of Divinity.

- The Young Clanroy. London: Smith, Elder & Co. 1897. OCLC 680458390. (novel)
- The Miracles of Jesus. London: Ibister & Co. 1901.
- The Opportunity of the Church of England. London: Longmans. 1905.
- The Principles of Religious Education. London: Longmans, Green, and Co. 1906.
- Thoughts on Some of the Parables of Jesus. London: Pitman. 1909.
- The Parables of Jesus. London: E. P. Dutton & Company. 1918.
- The Unity of the Church of England. London: SPCK. 1925. OCLC 752972606.
- The Oppression of Religion in Russia. London: Hodder & Stoughton. 1930. OCLC 810790425. (based on a speech to the House of Lords)

== Arms ==
Coat of arms of Cosmo Gordon Lang

Notes
While serving as a bishop Lang's arms would be displayed impaled with the arms of the diocese and topped by a mitre.
Escutcheon
Quarterly per fess indented Argent and Sable in the first quarter an open book Proper leaved Gules in the last quarter two dock leaves Vert.

== Footnotes ==
Church of England titles
Preceded by Arthur Winnington-Ingram	Bishop of Stepney; 1901–1909	Succeeded by Luke Paget
Preceded by William Maclagan	Archbishop of York; 1909–1928	Succeeded by William Temple
Preceded by Randall Davidson	Archbishop of Canterbury; 1928–1942	Succeeded by William Temple
Peerage of the United Kingdom
New creation	Baron Lang of Lambeth; 1942–1945	Extinct
