= John Marshall Lang =

Scottish minister (1834–1909)

The Very Reverend John Marshall Lang CVO
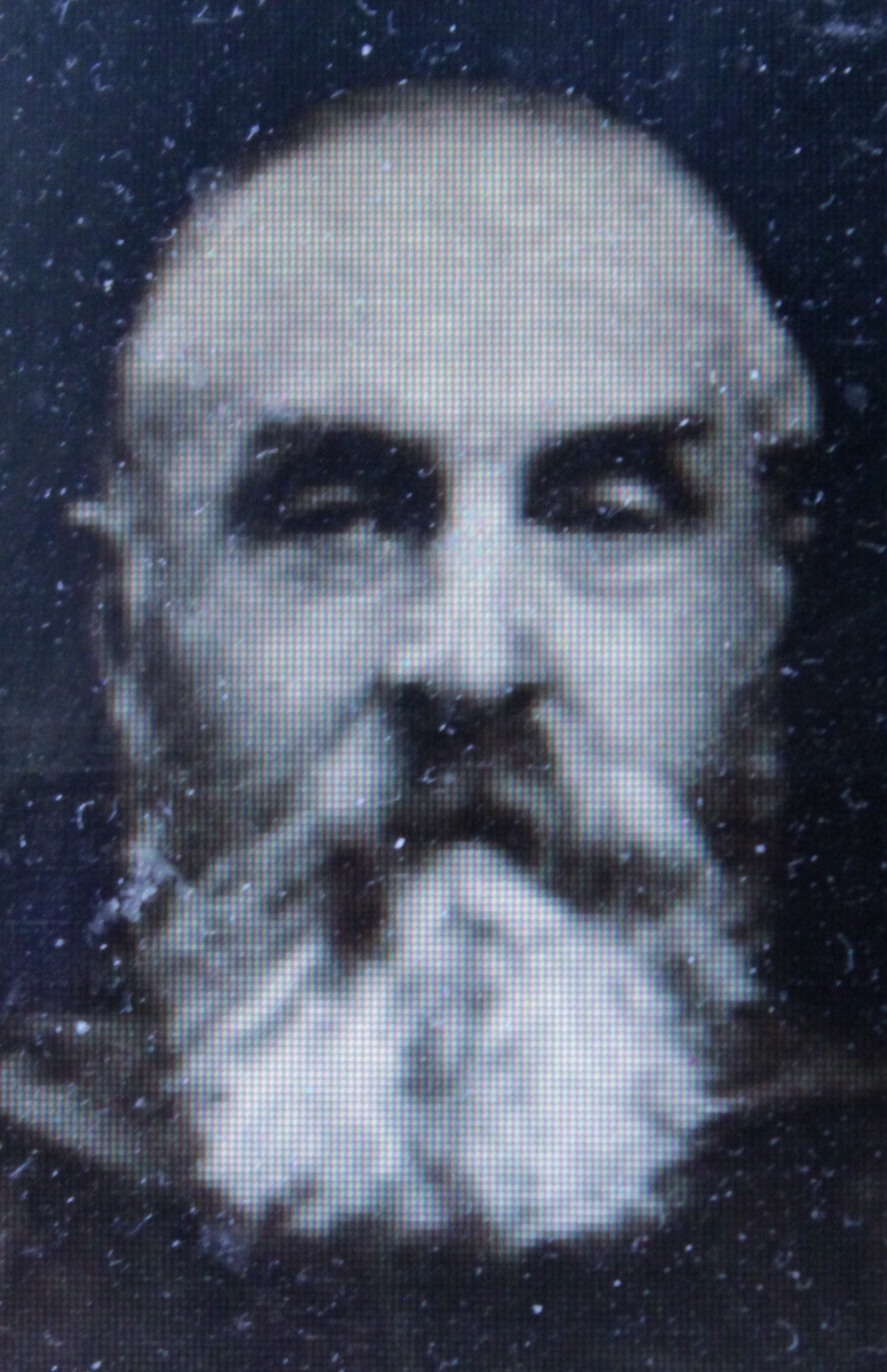
- Lang in 1900

Principal of the University of Aberdeen
- In office 1900–1909
- Preceded by: Sir William Geddes
- Succeeded by: Sir George Adam Smith

Personal details
- Born: 14 May 1834 Glassford, South Lanarkshire, Scotland
- Died: 2 May 1909 (aged 74) Aberdeen, Aberdeenshire, Scotland
- Spouse: Hannah Agnes Keith (m. 1859)
- Children: 8 including Cosmo, Marshall, and Norman
- Education: University of Glasgow
- Profession: Minister, author, and university administrator

John Marshall Lang CVO (1834 – 2 May 1909) was a Church of Scotland minister and author. He served as Moderator of the General Assembly in 1893 and later became Principal of the University of Aberdeen in 1900.

== Life ==
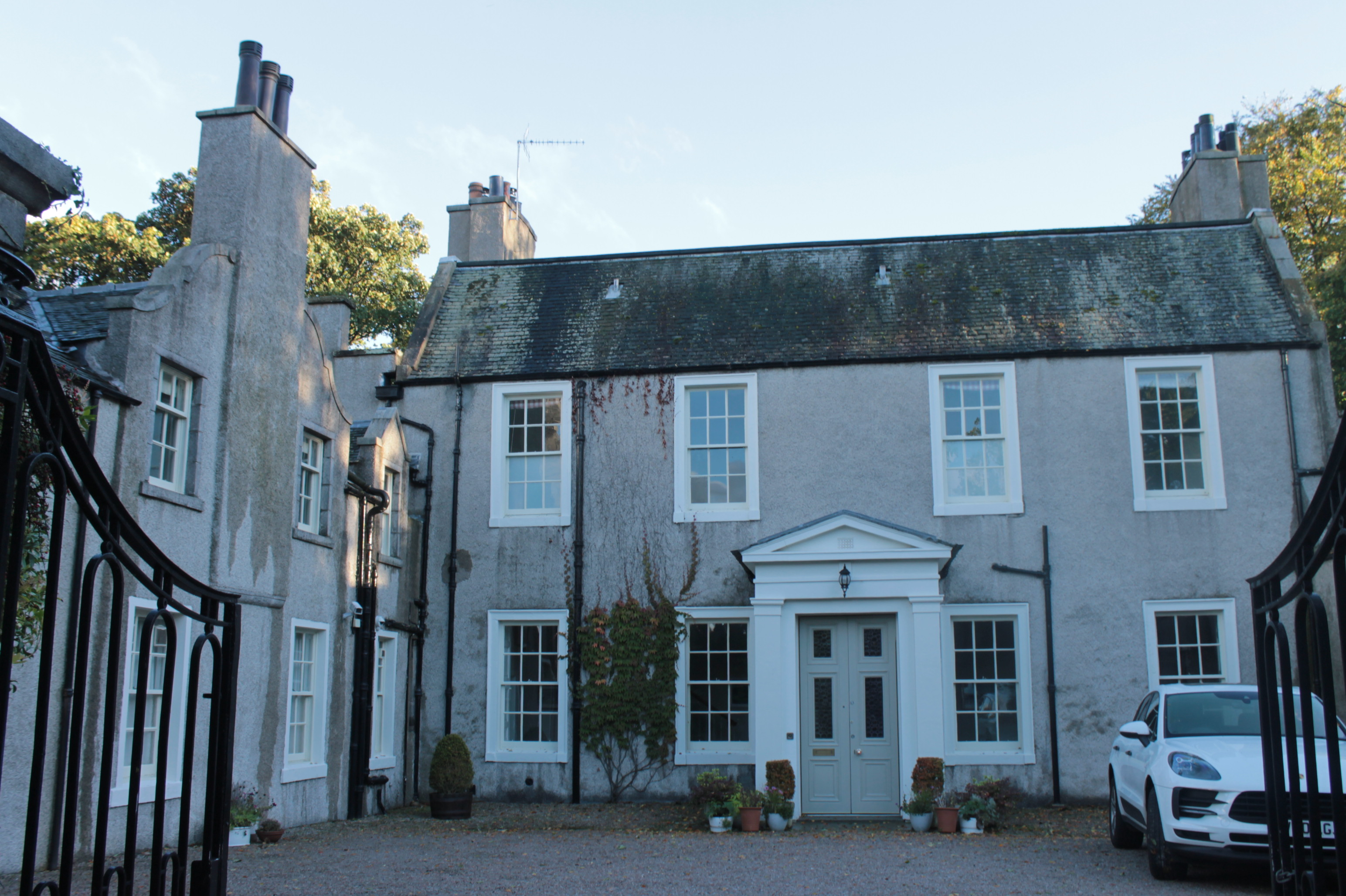
Chanonry Lodge, 13 The Chanonry, Old Aberdeen

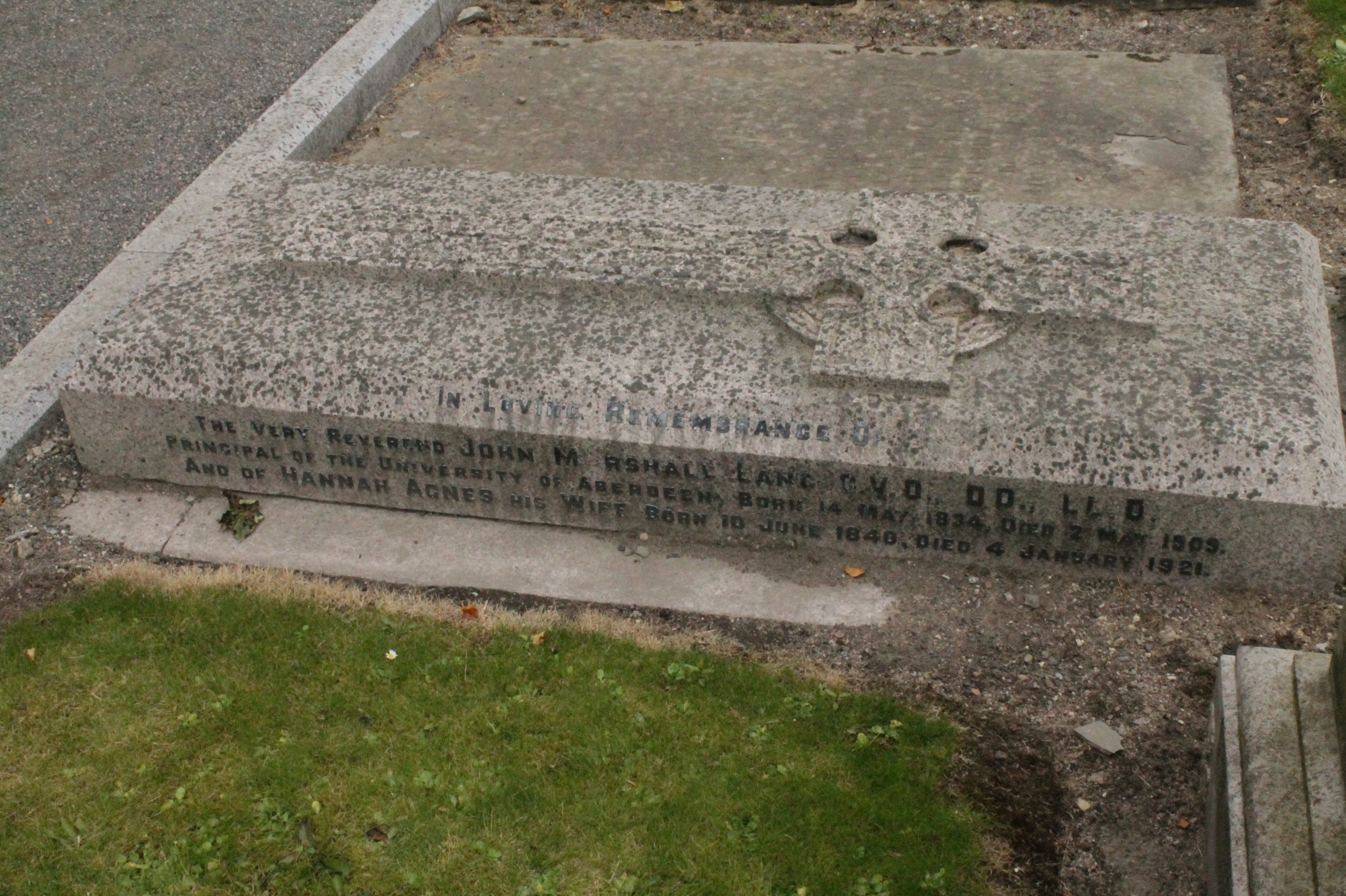
The grave of John Marshall Lang, St Machar's Cathedral

He was born in the manse at Glassford into an eminent ecclesiastical family on 14 May 1834. His father was the minister Gavin Lang. His mother was Agnes Roberton Marshall. He was the second of eleven children, including Robert Hamilton Lang.

He studied Sciences at Glasgow University but did not graduate. He then trained as a minister at Divinity Hall In Glasgow, He was ordained by the Church of Scotland at the Kirk of St Nicholas in Aberdeen. In 1858 he moved to the more rural parish of Fyvie. He later served in Anderston in Glasgow and Morningside Church in Edinburgh.

In 1893 he succeeded Archibald Charteris as Moderator of the General Assembly of the Church of Scotland and was succeeded in turn in 1894 by Rev Robert Herbert Story. His third son Cosmo Gordon Lang was Archbishop of Canterbury from 1928 to 1942; his fifth son Marshall Buchanan Lang was Moderator of the General Assembly of the Church of Scotland from 1935 to 1936; and another son, Norman MacLeod Lang was Bishop suffragan of Leicester (in the Church of England).

In early 1900 he moved to Aberdeen, having been elected as Principal of Aberdeen University on 31 March of that year in place of Rev Prof William Robinson Pirie. He lived at Chanonry Lodge at 13 Chanonry, midway between King's College, Aberdeen and St Machar's Cathedral. In his role as Principal he was created a Commander of the Royal Victorian Order (CVO) by King Edward VII during a visit to the university in 1906.

He died on 2 May 1909 at the Chanonry Lodge and is buried in the eastern enclosure attaching the east end of St Machar's Cathedral.

== Publications ==
- Heaven and Home (1880)
- The Last Supper of Our Lord (1881)
- Ancient Religions of Central America (1882)
- Life: Is it Worth Living (1883)
- The Anglican Church (1884)
- Gideon and the Judges: A Study Practical and Historical (1890)
- Glasgow and the Barony Thereof (1895)
- The Expansion of the Christian Life (1897)
- The Church and its Social Mission (1901)

== Family ==
In 1859 he was married to Hannah Agnes Keith (1840-1921), daughter of Rev Dr Peter Hay Keith of Hamilton.

They had seven sons and one daughter: his eldest son Marshall Buchanan Lang also served as Moderator, his third son Cosmo Gordon Lang later becoming Archbishop of Canterbury. His youngest son David Marshall Lang (1878-1925) is buried in Warriston Cemetery in north Edinburgh.

Academic offices
Preceded by Sir William Geddes	Principal and Vice-Chancellor of the University of Aberdeen; 1900—1909	Succeeded by Sir George Adam Smith
