= William Duguid Geddes =

Scottish scholar and educationalist (1828–1900)

Sir William Geddes
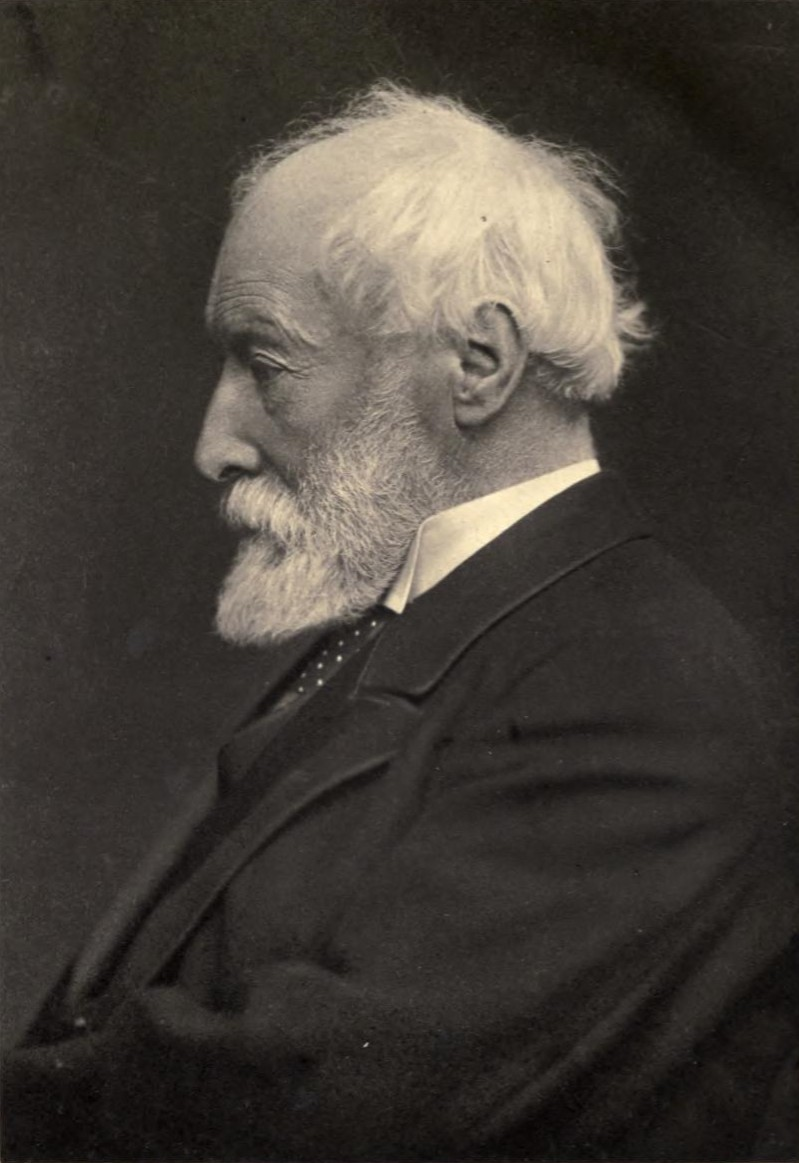

Principal of the University of Aberdeen
- In office 1885–1900
- Preceded by: Reverend William Robinson Pirie
- Succeeded by: Reverend John Marshall Lang

Personal details
- Born: 21 November 1828 Glass, Aberdeenshire, Scotland
- Died: 9 February 1900 (aged 71) Aberdeen, Aberdeenshire, Scotland
- Spouse: Rachel Robertson (m. 1859)
- Children: 1
- Education: Elgin Academy
- Alma mater: King's College, Aberdeen
- Profession: Scholar and educationalist

Sir William Duguid Geddes (21 November 1828 – 9 February 1900) was a Scottish scholar and educationalist, who served as Professor of Greek at the University of Aberdeen from 1855 to 1885 and then as Principal of the University of Aberdeen from 1885 until his death. Geddes's classical translations, grammars and scholarship contributed to publications both written with collaborators and edited in series. One of the outstanding scholars of his generation in Scotland, he was the architect of the fusion of the modern University of Aberdeen and its High Victorian development.

== Life ==
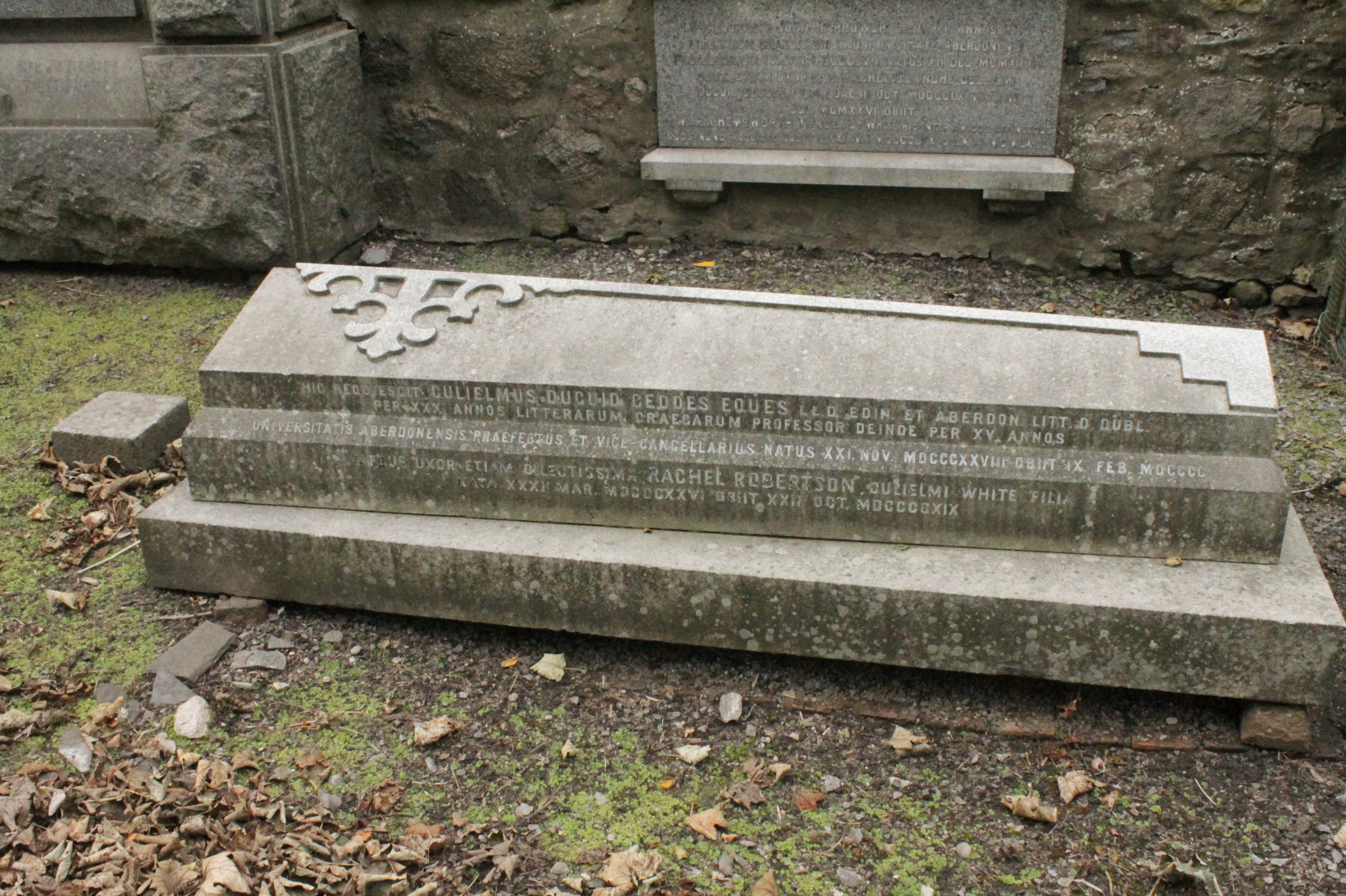
The grave of Sir William Duguid Geddes, St Machar's Cathedral

Geddes was born in Glass, Aberdeenshire, to Jane Mcconnachie and John Geddes. Both his father and grandfather were successful farmers. William's three sisters Jane, Margaret and Charlotte went to live at Dresden, Germany where they became leading feminist academics at the university. One of his brothers was a judge at Bengal, made a lot of money in the United States, and bought a house in central London, where he entertained High Society.

Geddes was educated at Elgin Academy and university and King's College, Aberdeen, and was parish schoolmaster at Gamrie in his early career. In 1853, he was appointed rector of Aberdeen Grammar School. From 1855, he was Professor of Greek at King's College, and when King's College merged with Marischal College to form the modern University of Aberdeen in 1860 he was appointed as Professor of Greek at the united university. In 1885, following the death of William Robinson Pirie, Geddes was appointed Principal of the University of Aberdeen.

It is chiefly as a teacher that Geddes is remembered, and in his enthusiastic and successful efforts to raise the standard of Greek at the Scottish universities he has been compared with the humanists of the Renaissance. Amongst other works he was the author of A Greek Grammar (1855; 17th edition, 1883; new and revised edition, 1893); a meritorious edition of the Phaedo of Plato (2nd ed., 1885); and The Problem of the Homeric Poems (1878), in which, while supporting Grote's view that the Iliad consisted of an original Achilles with insertions or additions by later hands, he maintains that these insertions are due to the author of the Odyssey.

Professor Richard Claverhouse Jebb referred to him as "one of the finest scholars in the country" with particular reference to his translation of Flosculi Graeci Boreales first published in 1882. Musa Latina was written by Aberdonian, Arthur Johnstone, physician at the Stuart Courts of James I and Charles I. the city area was renowned as the most Catholic and Episcopalian in the Lowlands, but also the most flourishing in the post-renaissance arts in the whole of Scotland. The cultural centre lent writers to an academic and scholastic revival in early seventeenth century Aberdeenshire. "A singularly cultured group of individuals, that no area in the British Isles... could match when they appeared", wrote Geddes in his translation of Johnston's Latin and Greek work.

Geddes was one of the most instrumental scholars in promoting the academic excellence of the combined fusion of the two schools in Aberdeen. In 1876, he was created LL.D. of the University of Edinburgh, Litt.D. of Trinity College Dublin in 1893; and his contribution was fully acknowledged when he was knighted in 1892.

He died at Chanonry Lodge in Old Aberdeen, on 9 February 1900. He is buried nearby in the churchyard of St Machar's Cathedral. The grave lies east of the church.

== Family ==
Geddes married on 28 April 1859 Rachel Robertson (1826–1919), daughter of William White, merchant, of Aberdeen; she survived him, with an only daughter, Rachel Blanche Geddes, who married on 23 June 1887 Mr. John Harrower, professor of Greek at Aberdeen.

== Works ==
- A Greek Grammar for the Use of Schools and Colleges (1855; 17th edition, 1883; new and revised edition, 1893)
- Classical Education in the North of Scotland (1869)
- The Celtic Tongue: A Lecture (1874)
- The Problem of the Homeric Poems (1878)
- Flosculi graeci boreales; sive, Anthologia graeca Aberdonensis (translation, 1882)
- Phaedo of Plato (2nd ed., 1885)
- Historical characteristics of the Celtic race (1885)
- Lacunar Basilicae Sancti Macarii Aberdonensis: The Heraldic Ceiling of the Cathedral Church of St Machar Old Aberdeen (1888)
- Memorials of a Banffshire Glen (1890)
- Musa Latina Aberdonensis 9 vols (1895) edited by Sir William Geddes.

== Arms ==
Coat of arms of William Duguid Geddes
Escutcheon Three geds or luces naiant in pale Or on a chief Ermine a book expanded of the second between two Greek crosses of the first. Motto Studendo

Academic offices
Preceded by Reverend William Robinson Pirie	Principal and Vice-Chancellor of the University of Aberdeen; 1885—1900	Succeeded by Reverend John Marshall Lang
