= Marshall Lang (son) =

Scottish minister (1868–1954)

Marshall Buchanan Lang TD (1868 – 3 October 1954) was a Church of Scotland minister and author.

He was born into an ecclesiastical family in 1868. John Marshall Lang, his father, was Moderator of the General Assembly of the Church of Scotland in 1893 and two of his brothers converted to the Church of England and joined its senior clergy: Cosmo was Archbishop of Canterbury from 1928 to 1942 and Norman was Bishop suffragan of Leicester.

He was educated at Glasgow Academy and Glasgow University. He was Minister at Oldmeldrum, then at St John's (Cross) in Dundee from 1909 before moving to his father's former Kirk at Whittingehame in 1918. He was Moderator of the General Assembly of the Church of Scotland in 1935. He died on 3 October 1954.
