= Chanonry Lodge =

Building in Old Aberdeen

Chanonry Lodge (or Belhelvie Manse)
- Viewed from front gates

- Location within Scotland
- 57.1690°N 2.10257°W
- Location: Aberdeen, United Kingdom

History
- Built: late 18th century

Site notes
- Owner: University of Aberdeen
- Website: https://www.abdn.ac.uk/events/confevents/venues/chanonry-lodge/

Listed Building – Category B
- Official name: Chanonry Lodge, 13 The Chanonry, Old Aberdeen, Aberdeen
- Designated: 12 January 1967
- Reference no.: LB20192

Listed Building – Category B
- Official name: Boundary Walls, Chanonry Lodge, 13 The Chanonry, Old Aberdeen, Aberdeen
- Designated: 12 January 1967
- Reference no.: LB20193

The Chanonry Lodge is a building on The Chanonry in Old Aberdeen. For over 100 years, it served as the house of the Principal of the University of Aberdeen.

== History ==
The original Belhelvie Manse was built by George Seton (parson of Belhelvie). Later the Marquess of Huntly, who, due to the reformation was forced to stay in the area, bought the manse alongside two adjacent manses; Daviot and Forbes, enclosing their gardens into one; though he lived in the Belhelvie Manse.

The present manse was built in the late 18th century on the site of two prior manses, Daviot and Belhelvie, it was remodelled circa 1830. The building came into the hands of the University of Aberdeen in the mid 19th century. From the 1880s, it came into use as the home of the principal of the university, and his family. Principal Sir William Duguid Geddes died there in 1900.

The building was once visited by Princess Helena Victoria, and by Charles III (then Duke of Rothesay) in 2009.

In a notable break from tradition, Peter Edwards, appointed principal in November 2025, refused to move into the building. Following this, the building announced to be subject to a £200,000 renovation in order to turn it into a "meeting place", in order to "generate revenue for the university". The building had already undergone £119,000 of renovations since 2020.

== Description ==
The building is formed from a central two-storey block topped by a mansard roof, with pedimented wings; it is mostly Georgian, with Victorian additions, with the interior featuring a large library. The garden occupies the site of the former Forbes Manse, which had been removed.

The walls enclosing the garden date to the 1710s.

The building is situated opposite to St Machar's Cathedral.
