= Chambers (surname) =

Chambers is a common surname of English origin. It usually denoted either a servant who worked in his master's private chambers, or a camararius, a person in charge of an exchequer room. At the time of the British census of 1881, the relative frequency of the surname Chambers was highest in Nottinghamshire (4.4 times the British average), followed by Northamptonshire, Huntingdonshire, Lincolnshire, Bedfordshire, Rutland, Suffolk, Derbyshire, Haddingtonshire and Kent. Related surnames include Chalmers and Chamberlain.

== People ==
=== A ===
- Adam Chambers (politician) (born 1985), Canadian politician
- Adam Chambers (footballer) (born 1980), English footballer
- Aden Chambers (born 1980), American wrestler
- Adron Chambers (born 1986), American baseball player
- Aidan Chambers (1934–2025), British author
- Akeem Chambers (born 1998), Jamaican footballer
- Al Chambers (born 1961), American baseball player
- Alan Chambers (Northern Ireland politician) (born 1947), Politician from Northern Ireland
- Alan Chambers (activist) (born 1972), American ex-gay activist
- Alan Chambers (explorer) (born 1968), British polar explorer
- Alan Chambers (Canadian politician) (1904–1981), Canadian politician
- Albert A. Chambers (1906–1993), American Anglican bishop
- Alex Chambers (born 1978), Australian mixed martial artist
- Alexander Chambers (1832–1888), American general
- Andrew Chambers (1931–2017), United States Army general
- Andy Chambers (born 1966), English author and game designer
- Anne Chambers (author), Irish writer
- Anne Coleman Chambers (1940–2020), American educator
- Anne Cox Chambers (1919–2020), American businesswoman
- Annie Chambers (1843–1935), American brothel owner
- Annika Chambers (born 1985), American blues singer and songwriter
- Ari Chambers (born 1991), American sports journalist
- Arthur Chambers (1846–1923), American boxer
- Arthur Chambers (baseball) (1903–1928), American baseball player
- Ashley Chambers (born 1990), English footballer

=== B ===
- Barzillai J. Chambers (1817–1895), American politician
- Becky Chambers (born 1985), American science-fiction writer
- Bernard Chambers (1903–1936), English footballer
- Bertram Chambers (1866–1945), Royal Navy Admiral
- Bhofal Chambers (born 1961), Liberian politician
- Bill Chambers (basketball) (1930–2017), American basketball player and coach
- Bill Chambers (musician), Australian country musician
- Bill Chambers (gridiron football) (1923–1983), American football player
- Bill Chambers (baseball) (1888–1962), American baseball player
- Bill Chambers (footballer) (1906–1978), English footballer
- Billi Chambers, American basketball coach
- Bob Chambers (cartoonist) (1905–1996), Canadian cartoonist and illustrator
- Bob Chambers (runner) (1926–2010), American track and field athlete
- Bob Chambers (footballer) (1899–1973), English footballer
- Boyd Chambers (1884–1964), American football, basketball, and baseball coach
- Bradley B. Chambers (born 1964), American businessman and politician
- Bradnee Chambers (1966–2019), Canadian environmentalist
- Brandon Chambers, American basketball coach
- Brant Chambers (born 1980), Australian rules footballer
- Brian Chambers (footballer) (born 1949), English footballer
- Brian Chambers (cricketer) (born 1965), Australian-born English cricketer
- Brian Chambers (curator) (born 1979), American art curator and gallery owner
- Brittany Chambers (born 1991), American basketball player
- Bruce Chambers (American football), American football player and coach
- Bruce Chambers (footballer) (born 1959), Australian rules footballer

=== C ===
- C. Fred Chambers (1918–1989), American oilman and political activist
- C. Haddon Chambers (1860–1921), Australian dramatist
- Callum Chambers (born 1979), Australian rules footballer
- Calum Chambers (born 1995), English footballer
- Carlton Chambers (born 1975), Canadian sprinter
- Charles Bosseron Chambers (1880–1964), American painter
- Charles Chambers (cricketer) (1870–1921), English cricketer
- Charles Chambers (referee) (1894–1941), English cue sports referee
- Charles Edward Chambers (1883–1941), American painter
- Charlie Chambers (actor) (born 1996), English actor
- Cheryl Chambers (born 1968), Australian basketball player
- Chloe Chambers (born 2004), American racing driver
- Chris Chambers (born 1978), American football player
- Chris-Ann Chambers (born 1995), Jamaican footballer
- Christina Chambers (born 1969), American actress and model
- Christine Chambers, Canadian psychologist
- Christopher Chambers, British neuroscientist
- Ciaran Chambers (born 1994), Irish badminton player
- Clare Chambers (philosopher) (born 1976), British political philosopher
- Clare Chambers (novelist) (born 1966), British novelist of different genres
- Claude William Chambers (1861–1947), Australian architect
- Cliff Chambers (1922–2012), American baseball pitcher
- Colin Chambers (1926–2005), New Zealand swimmer
- Corey Chambers (born 1997), Canadian curler
- Craig Chambers, American computer scientist
- Curt Chambers, American singer-songwriter
- Cyril Chambers (1897–1975), Australian politician

=== D ===
- Dani Chambers, American voice actress
- Danny Chambers (born 1982), British politician and veterinarian
- Dave Chambers (born 1940), Canadian ice hockey coach
- Dave Chambers (footballer) (born 1947), English footballer
- David Chambers (congressman) (1780–1864), American politician
- David John Chambers (1930–2025), British bibliographer
- Deborah Chambers (born 1961), New Zealand King's Counsel
- Dennis Chambers (born 1959), American drummer
- Dominic Chambers (born 1984), English cricketer
- Don Chambers, American cartoonist
- Donald Chambers (author) (1935–2015), Australian historian and writer
- Donald Eugene Chambers (1930–1999), American Marine and outlaw biker
- Donna Chambers (born 1950), American jewelry designer
- Doran Chambers, American DJ and electronic music producer
- Doris Chambers (1884–1983), English golfer
- Dorothea Lambert Chambers (1878–1960), British tennis and badminton player
- Dorothy Kinney Chambers (1901–2001), Baptist missionary physician
- Dwain Chambers (born 1978), British track sprinter

=== E ===
- E. K. Chambers (1866–1954), English literary critic and Shakespeare scholar
- Eddie Chambers (born 1982), American boxer
- Eddie Chambers (artist) (born 1960), Artist, curator and academic
- Edward R. Chambers (1795–1872), American politician from Virginia
- Edward T. Chambers (1930–2015), American community organizer
- Egan Chambers (1921–1994), Canadian politician
- Elizabeth Chambers (television personality) (born 1982), American actress
- Elizabeth Chambers (pilot) (1920–1961), American aviator
- Elizabeth Chambers (actress) (1933–2018), British television actress
- Elmer Chambers (1897–1952), American jazz trumpeter
- Emma Chambers (1964–2018), English actress
- Emma Chambers (soubrette) (1848–1933), English mezzo-soprano
- Ephraim Chambers (c. 1680–1740), English writer and encyclopaedist
- Erika Chambers (born 1948), British-Israeli Mossad operative
- Erin Chambers (born 1979), American actress
- Erin Wolf Chambers, American computer scientist
- Ernest Chambers (cyclist) (1907–1985), English track cyclist
- Ernest Chambers (rugby union) (1882–1946), England international rugby union player
- Ernest J. Chambers (1862–1925), Canadian journalist and historian
- Ernie Chambers (born 1937), Member of the Nebraska Legislature
- Erynn Chambers (born 1992), American social media influencer
- Evan Chambers (born 1963), American classical composer
- Ezekiel F. Chambers (1788–1867), American judge

=== F ===
- Fergie Chambers (born c. 1985), American heir and political activist
- Florence Chambers (1907–1979), American swimmer
- Francis Chambers (1828–1900), British architect
- Frank Chambers (born 1949), Irish politician

=== G ===
- Gary Chambers (born 1985), American activist and politician
- George B. Chambers (1881–1969), British priest and activist
- George Chambers, Prime Minister of Trinidad and Tobago from 1981 to 1986
- George Chambers (Pennsylvania politician) (1786–1866), American judge
- George Chambers (painter) (1803–1840), English painter
- George Chambers (cricketer, born 1866) (1866–1927), English cricketer
- George Chambers (cricketer, born 1884) (1884–1947), English cricketer
- George Chambers (New York politician) (1815–1880), American politician
- George Chambers (MP) (1766 – after 1826), British politician
- George Frederick Chambers (1841–1915), English barrister and author
- Gordon Chambers (born c. 1969), American singer-songwriter
- Greg Chambers (born 1982), British/Canadian ice hockey player
- Gretta Chambers (1927–2017), Canadian journalist
- Guy Chambers (born 1963), English songwriter, musician and record producer

=== H ===
- Harry Chambers (1896–1949), English footballer and manager
- Harry Walker Chambers (1842–1907), British sportsman
- Helen Chambers (1879–1935), British pathologist
- Henderson Chambers (1908–1967), American jazz musician
- Henry Chambers (Indian Army officer) (1897–1967), British Indian Army officer
- Henry Chambers (rugby union) (1865–1934), Scotland international rugby union player
- Henry Cousins Chambers (1823–1871), Confederate-American politician
- Henry H. Chambers (1790–1826), American politician
- Herb Chambers (born 1941), American businessman

=== I ===
- Iain Chambers (musician)
- Iain Michael Chambers (born 1949), British anthropologist and sociologist

=== J ===
- J. D. Chambers (1898–1970), British historian
- Jack Chambers (politician) (born 1990), Irish politician
- Jack Chambers (artist) (1931–1978), Canadian artist and filmmaker
- Jack Chambers (footballer) (1901–1983), Australian rules footballer
- Jack Chambers (linguist) (1938–2026), Canadian linguist
- Jackie Chambers (born 1984), American gridiron football player
- James Chambers (Irish footballer) (born 1987), Irish footballer
- James Chambers (politician) (1863–1917), Irish lawyer and Unionist politician
- James Chambers (English footballer) (born 1980), English footballer
- James Chambers (writer) (born 1970), American novelist
- James Chambers (mayor) (1864–1934), American politician
- James Cox Chambers (born 1957), American billionaire heir
- James F. Chambers Jr. (1913–2006), American newspaper publisher
- James S. Chambers (editor) (1853/1854–1923), American journalist
- James S. Chambers (publisher) (1821–1904), American journalist
- Jamie Chambers (born 1975), American game designer
- Jane Chambers (1937–1983), American playwright
- Jason Chambers (born 1980), American mixed martial arts fighter
- Jennifer Paige Chambers, American musical theatre performer
- Jeremy Chambers (born 1974), Australian author
- Jerry Chambers (born 1943), American basketball player
- Jim Chambers (1927–1997), Canadian football player
- Joan Chambers (1930–2016), Australian politician
- Jocelyn Chambers, American composer
- Joe Chambers (born 1942), American jazz musician and composer
- Joe Chambers (basketball) (born 1982), American wheelchair basketball player
- Joe Chambers (singer) (1942–2024), American musician
- Joe Chambers (musician) (1954–2022), American musician and producer
- John B. Chambers (born c. 1955), American businessman
- John Chambers (make-up artist) (1922–2001), American make-up artist
- John Chambers (politician) (1780–1852), American politician
- John Chambers (statistician) (born 1941), American statistician
- John Chambers (bishop) (died 1556), English Benedictine and bishop
- John Chambers (topographer) (1780–1839), English topographer, biographer and antiquarian
- John Chambers (footballer) (born 1949), English footballer
- John Chambers (artist) (1852–1928), English painter
- John Chambers (businessman) (1839–1903), New Zealand businessman
- John Chambers (English cricketer) (born 1971), English cricketer
- John Chambers (Australian cricketer) (1930–2017), Australian cricketer
- John Chambers (pastoralist) (1819–1893), New Zealand pastoralist
- John Chambers (role-playing writer), Game designer
- John David Chambers (1805–1893), English barrister and legal and liturgical writer
- John Graham Chambers (1843-1883), Welsh sports administrator
- John Green Chambers (1798–1884), American pharmacist and politician
- John M. Chambers (politician) (1845–1916), American politician
- John T. Chambers (born 1949), American businessman
- John Thomas Chambers Jr. (1928–2011), American politician
- Johnnie Chambers (1911–1977), American baseball player
- Jordan Chambers (1896–1962), American politician
- Joseph B. Chambers (1833–1909), American Medal of Honor recipient
- Joseph Bernard Chambers (1859–1931), New Zealand sheep farmer, viticulturist and wine-maker
- Joseph Chambers (politician) (1815–1884), English-born Australian politician
- Joseph Chambers (Royal Navy officer) (1864–1935), Irish Royal Navy officer
- Joseph N. Chambers (1798–1874), American politician and army officer
- Josh Chambers (born 2003), English footballer
- Joy Chambers (1947–2023), Australian actress, author, poet and businesswoman
- Julia Chambers (born 1956), British actress
- Julius Chambers (1850–1920), American journalist
- Julius L. Chambers (1936–2013), American lawyer, civil rights leader and educator
- Justice M. Chambers (1908–1982), American lawyer
- Justin Chambers (born 1970), American actor & model
- Justine A. Chambers, Canadian choreographer

=== K ===
- Kasey Chambers (born 1976), Australian singer-songwriter
- Kathleen Chambers (1880–1965), English politician
- Kelly Chambers (politician), American politician from Washington
- Ken Chambers (1933–2021), Australian rules footballer
- Kevin Chambers, American attorney
- Kim Chambers (born 1974), American pornographic actress
- Kim Chambers (swimmer), New Zealand open water swimmer
- Kimberley Chambers (author) (born 1967), British novelist
- Kirk Chambers (born 1979), American football player and coach
- Kit Chambers (born 1949), New Zealand cricketer

=== L ===
- Laura Chambers, Technology executive
- Lawrence Chambers (born 1929), American naval officer
- Lee Chambers (psychologist) (born 1985), British psychologist and entrepreneur
- Lee Chambers (born 1970), Canadian writer and film director
- Lenoir Chambers (1891–1970), American journalist
- Leo Chambers (born 1995), English footballer
- Leon Chambers (born 1998), American-born Australian rower
- Leonard Chambers (born 1941), Jamaican cricketer
- Leroy Chambers (born 1972), English footballer
- Lester Chambers (born 1940), American musician
- Letitia Chambers (born 1943), American museum director
- Liam Chambers, Irish historian and academic
- Lin Chambers, American physical scientist
- Linda Chambers (playwright) (born 1954), American dramatist
- Lindsay Nicole Chambers (born 1981), American actress and singer
- Lisa Chambers (born 1986), Irish former politician
- Lucinda Chambers (born 1959), British fashion director, designer and stylist
- Lucy Chambers (1834–1894), Australian contralto
- Lucy Chambers (actress) (born 2007), English actress
- Luke Chambers (born 1985), English footballer
- Luke Chambers (footballer, born 2004), English footballer

=== M ===
- Marcus Chambers (born 1994), American sprinter
- Marianne Chambers, fl.]] 1799–1812)
- Marilyn Chambers (1952–2009), American pornographic film actress
- Marjorie Bell Chambers (1923–2006), American educator, historian, and politician
- Marjorie Chambers (1906–1989), New Zealand nurse
- Martin Chambers (born 1951), English musician
- Martin Chambers (priest) (1964–2024), Scottish Roman Catholic clergyman
- Mary Anne Chambers (born 1950), Canadian politician
- Matthew Chambers (born 1968), English actor
- Maurice Chambers (born 1987), English cricketer
- Merle Chambers (born 1946), American lawyer and business executive
- Meshach Chambers (1867–1920), English cricketer
- Michael A. Chambers (born 1946), Canadian lawyer
- Michael Chambers (born 1967), American dancer and actor
- Montague Chambers (1799–1885), British politician
- Munro Chambers (born 1990), Canadian actor

=== N ===
- Nadia Chambers (born 1968), British actress
- Nanci Chambers (born 1963), American actress
- Nash Chambers (born 1974), Australian musician
- Neil Chambers (born 1974), American architect, writer and blogger
- Nick Chambers (born 1985), American stand-up comedian
- Noel Chambers (1923–1990), New Zealand swimmer
- Norah Chambers (1905–1989), British chorale conductor

=== O ===
- Olivene Chambers (1925–2019), Jamaican educator
- Olivia Chambers (born 2003), American Paralympic swimmer
- Oswald Chambers (1874–1917), Scottish baptist and evangelist

=== P ===
- Pat Chambers (born 1970), American basketball coach
- Patrick Chambers (labor organizer) (1901–1990), American communist
- Paul Chambers (1935–1969), American jazz double bassist
- Paul Chambers (industrialist) (1904–1981), British civil servant and industrialist
- Paul Chambers (footballer) (born 1982), Australian rules footballer
- Paul Chambers (Paralympian), New Zealand Paralympian athlete
- Paul Chambers (academic) (born 1966), American political scientist
- Peter Chambers (rower) (born 1990), British rower
- Peter Chambers (footballer) (1878–1952), English footballer
- Phil Chambers (1916–1993), American actor
- Phil Chambers (footballer) (born 1953), English footballer
- Philemon Chambers (born 1994), American actor

=== R ===
- R. C. Chambers (1832–1901), American 19th-century businessman, politician
- Ray Chambers (born 1942), Philanthropist and humanitarian
- Raymond J. Chambers (1917–1999), Australian accountant
- Raymond Wilson Chambers (1874–1942), British academic and author
- Rebecca Ballard Chambers (1858–1920), American newspaper editor and temperance worker
- Rebecca Chambers (pianist) (born 1975), Australian pianist
- Reed McKinley Chambers (1894–1972), American flying ace
- Ricardo Chambers (born 1984), Jamaican track and field athlete
- Richard Chambers (rower) (born 1985), British rower
- Richard Chambers (journalist) (born 1989), Irish journalist and author
- Richard Chambers (rugby union) (1927–2020), Northern Ireland rugby union player
- Richard Chambers (police officer) (born 1972), New Zealand police officer
- Richard Dickinson Chambers (1935–2019), British chemist
- Richard Harvey Chambers (1906–1994), American judge
- Rivers Chambers, American jazz musician
- Robert Chambers (publisher, born 1802) (1802–1871), Scottish publisher and writer
- Robert Chambers (criminal) (born 1966), American criminal
- Robert Chambers (Quebec politician) (1809–1886), Canadian politician
- Robert Chambers (development scholar) (born 1932), British sociologist
- Robert Chambers (English judge) (1737–1803), English jurist
- Robert Chambers (New Zealand judge) (1953–2013), New Zealand judge and Supreme Court justice
- Robert Chambers Jr. (1832–1888), Scottish publisher and encyclopaedist
- Robert Chambers (oarsman) (1831–1868), English oarsman and world sculling champion
- Robert Chambers (Canadian politician) (1813–1875), Canadian politician
- Robert Chambers (sculptor) (born 1958), American sculptor
- Robert Chambers (biologist) (1881–1957), American biologist
- Robert Chambers (priest) (1571–1628), English Catholic priest, writer and translator
- Robert Chambers (cricketer) (born 1943), English cricketer
- Robert Charles Chambers (born 1952), American judge
- Robert G. Chambers (1924–2016), British physicist
- Robert W. Chambers (1865–1933), American artist and author
- Rome Chambers (1875–1902), American baseball player
- Ron Chambers (born 1958), Jamaican long jumper
- Ronnie Chambers (born c.1934), Northern Irish athlete
- Roy Chambers (1892–1955), Australian rugby union player
- Royd Chambers (born 1961), American politician
- Rusty Chambers (1953–1981), American football player
- Ruth Chambers (born 1960), Canadian artist

=== S ===
- Sam Chambers (born 2007), Scottish footballer
- Sandra Chambers (born 1967), British singer
- Scott Chambers, English actor and film producer
- Sean Chambers (born 1965), American basketball player
- Sean Chambers (musician), American singer
- Shamawd Chambers (born 1989), Canadian football wide receiver
- Shawn Chambers (born 1966), American ice hockey player
- Shireen Chambers (born 1962), British forester
- Shirley Chambers (1913–2011), American actress
- Sinead Chambers (born 1992), Irish badminton player
- Siyani Chambers (born 1993), American basketball player
- Stan Chambers (1923–2015), American television reporter
- Stanley Chambers (1910–1991), British cyclist
- Steele Chambers (born 2000), American football player
- Stephanie Chambers (born 1971), British actress
- Stephen Chambers (born 1960), British artist and Royal Academician
- Steve Chambers (born 1968), English footballer
- Steven Chambers (born 1990), Australian baseball player
- Stuart Chambers (businessman) (born 1956), British businessman
- Stuart Chambers (ornithologist) (born 1937), New Zealand ornithologist
- Suzanne Chambers, Australian researcher in psycho-oncology

=== T ===
- Tahj Chambers (born 2000), American football player
- Ted Chambers (1900–1992), American football and soccer coach
- Teresa Chambers, American police officer
- Terry Chambers (born 1955), English drummer
- Thomas Chambers (British politician) (1814–1891), British politician
- Thomas Chambers (painter) (1808–1869), American painter
- Thomas Chambers (colonial administrator) (died 1692), English colonial administrator
- Thomas Chambers (footballer), Scottish footballer
- Thomas Chambers (cricketer) (1931–2015), South African cricketer
- Thomas Jefferson Chambers (1840–1929), American politician
- Thomas King Chambers (1818–1889), English physician
- Tim Chambers (baseball) (1965–2019), American college baseball coach
- Timothy Chambers, American philosopher
- Tom Chambers (basketball) (born 1959), American former NBA player
- Tom Chambers (actor) (born 1977), English actor
- Tom Chambers (politician) (1928–2018), Canadian politician
- Tom Chambers (judge) (1943–2013), American judge
- Tom Chambers (trade unionist) (1867–1926), British trade unionist
- Tom Chambers (bowls), Canadian international lawn bowls player
- Tony Chambers (born 1963), British magazine editor and creative director
- Triston Chambers (born 1982), English footballer

=== V ===
- Vactor Tousey Chambers (1830–1883), American entomologist
- Verone Chambers (born 1988), Jamaican athletics competitor
- Veronica Chambers (born 1970), Afro-Latina Writer and teacher
- Vita Chambers (born 1993), Canadian singer and songwriter

=== W ===
- W. Paris Chambers (1854–1913), American composer and bandmaster
- Wally Chambers (1951–2019), American football player
- Walter B. Chambers (1866–1945), American architect
- Walter Chambers (1824–1893), Anglican bishop
- Walter M. Chambers (1873–1934), Canadian politician
- Walter P. Chambers (1908–2003), Antiguan composer
- Washington Irving Chambers (1856–1934), US Navy officer
- Wayne Chambers (1936–1999), American jockey
- Wendy Mae Chambers (born 1953), American composer
- Wheaton Chambers (1887–1958), American actor
- Whittaker Chambers (1901–1961), American defected communist spy, writer, editor
- Will Chambers (born 1988), Australia international rugby league and union footballer
- William Chambers (architect) (1723–1796), British architect
- William Chambers (publisher) (1800–1883), Scottish publisher and politician
- William Chambers (Welsh politician) (1809-1882), Welsh politician
- William Chambers (milliner) (born 1979), Scottish hat designer
- William Chambers (MP) (died 1559), 16th-century English politician
- William Chambers (footballer) (born 1900), English footballer
- William Clarke Chambers (1862–1958), Canadian politician
- William Frederick Chambers (1786–1855), British physician
- William Henry Chambers, Canadian politician from Ontario
- William Lea Chambers (1852–1933), American judge
- Willie Chambers (born 1938), American musician
- Wylie Chambers (1928–1953), Australian rules footballer

== Fictional characters ==
- Diane Chambers, from the U.S. television series Cheers
- Peter Chambers, character from American old time radio detective show Crime and Peter Chambers
- Rebecca Chambers (character), from the Resident Evil video game franchise

== See also ==
- Chambers (disambiguation)
