= George Chambers (disambiguation) =

George Chambers (1928–1997) was Prime Minister of Trinidad and Tobago.

George Chambers may also refer to:

- George Chambers (cricketer, born 1866) (1866–1927), English cricketer
- George Chambers (cricketer, born 1884) (1884–1947), English cricketer
- George Chambers (New York politician) (1815–1880), New York politician
- George Chambers (painter) (1803–1840), British maritime artist
- George Chambers (Pennsylvania politician) (1786–1866), U.S. Representative from Pennsylvania
- George B. Chambers (1881–1969), English vicar and social activist
- George Chambers (musician) (1931–2019), of The Chambers Brothers
- George Frederick Chambers (1841–1915), English barrister, author and amateur astronomer
- George Chambers (MP) (1766–?), English soldier, lawyer and Member of Parliament
