= William Chambers =

William or Bill Chambers may refer to:

== Sportspeople ==
- Will Chambers (born 1988), Australian rugby league player
- Bill Chambers (American football) (1923–1983), American football offensive lineman
- Bill Chambers (basketball) (1930–2017), NCAA college record holder for rebounds
- Bill Chambers (footballer) (1906–1978), English footballer
- Bill Chambers (baseball) (1888–1962), Major League pitcher
- William Chambers (footballer), English footballer

== Politicians ==
- William Chambers (Welsh politician) (1809–1882), son of William Chambers (industrialist)
- William Chambers (MP) (died 1559)
- William Chambers (publisher) (1800–1883), lord provost of Edinburgh
- William Clarke Chambers (1862–19??), railway contractor and politician
- William Henry Chambers, Canadian politician

== Others ==
- William Chambers (architect) (1723–1796), Born to Scottish parents in Sweden, architect, based in London
- William Chambers (industrialist) (1774–1855), see Glamorgan Pottery
- William Frederick Chambers (1786–1855), British doctor and Fellow of the Royal Society
- William Chambers (milliner) (born 1979), Scottish hat designer
- W. Paris Chambers (1854–1913), American composer, cornet soloist and bandmaster
- William Lea Chambers (1852–1933), United States federal judge
- Bill Chambers (musician), Australian musician

== See also ==
- William Chambers Coker (1872–1953), American botanist
- Chambers family
- Billi Chambers, American women's basketball coach
- Willie Chambers (born 1938), American singer and guitarist
