= Bruce Chambers =

Bruce Chambers may refer to:

- Bruce Chambers (American football), American football coach
- Bruce Chambers (footballer) (born 1959), Australian rules footballer
