= Elizabeth Chambers =

Elizabeth Chambers may refer to:

- Elizabeth Chambers (actress) (1933–2018), British actress
- Elizabeth Chambers (pilot) (1920–1961), American pilot
- Elizabeth Chambers (television personality) (born 1982), American model, television host, news reporter and actress
