= Kimberley Chambers =

Kimberley Chambers may refer to:

- Kim Chambers (born 1974), American pornographic actress
- Kim Chambers (swimmer), New Zealand swimmer
- Kimberley Chambers (author) (born 1967), British novelist
