= Charles Chambers =

Charles Chambers may refer to:

- C. Haddon Chambers (1860–1921), Australian-born dramatist, active in England
- Charles Chambers (cricketer) (1870–1921), English cricketer
- DJ Funk (Charles Chambers, 1971–2025), Chicago house DJ who pioneered the ghetto house subgenre of house music
- Charles Edward Chambers (1883–1941), American illustrator and painter
- Charles Bosseron Chambers (1882–1964), American painter, illustrator and teacher
- Charles Chambers (referee) (c. 1894–1941), snooker and English billiards referee

== See also ==
- Chuck Chambers (disambiguation)
- Charlie Chambers, English actor
