= Chambers brothers =

Chambers brothers may refer to:

- Chambers brothers (pastoralists), James and John Chambers, early settlers in South Australia
- Chambers Brothers (gang), B.J., Larry, Willie and Otis Chambers, a criminal organization in Detroit during the 1980s
- The Chambers Brothers, an American psychedelic soul band

== See also ==
- Chambers (surname)
