= Dorothy Chambers =

Dorothy Chambers may refer to:

- Dorothea Lambert Chambers (1878–1960), British tennis player
- Dorothy Kinney Chambers (1901–2001), American missionary physician
