= David Chambers =

David Chambers may refer to:

- David Chambers (congressman) (1780–1864), U.S. Representative from Ohio
- David John Chambers (born 1930), English bibliographer, printing historian, printer and book-collector
- Dave Chambers (born 1940), Canadian ice hockey coach
- Dave Chambers (footballer) (born 1947), English professional footballer
- Blindboy Boatclub (David Chambers), comedian with The Rubberbandits
