= Drink (disambiguation) =

A drink is a liquid intended for human consumption.

Drink may also refer to:

- Alcoholic beverage, beverages containing alcohol
- Drinking, the act of consuming a drink
- Drink (film), 1917 British film by Sidney Morgan
- "Drink" (song), rap song by Lil Jon
- Drink (bar), see Craft cocktail movement
- Drink (play), see Emma Chambers (soubrette)
