= Paul Chambers (disambiguation) =

Paul Chambers (1935–1969) was an American jazz bassist.

Paul Chambers may also refer to:

- Paul Chambers (academic), American social scientist and Thailand researcher
- Sir Paul Chambers (industrialist) (1904–1981), British civil servant, industrialist, and chairman of ICI
- Paul Chambers (footballer) (born 1982), Australian rules footballer
- Paul Chambers (Paralympian), New Zealand Paralympic athlete
- Paul Chambers, involved in the legal case R v. Paul Chambers, better known as the Twitter joke trial
- Paul Bell Chambers (1868–1930), British architect who worked in Argentina
