= Charlie Chambers (disambiguation) =

Charlie Chambers (born 1996) is an English actor.

Charlie Chambers may also refer to:

- Charlie Chambers, character in Columbo season 9
- Charlie Chambers, see Longwood Cricket Club

== See also ==
- Charles Chambers (disambiguation)
