= Chuck Chambers =

Chuck Chambers may refer to:

- Robert C. "Chuck" Chambers, former Speaker of the West Virginia House of Delegates
- Chuck Chambers, the birth name of DJ Funk, a ghetto house producer
- Chuck Chambers (iCarly), a character on the television show iCarly

== See also ==
- Charles Chambers
