= Thomas King Chambers =

English physician

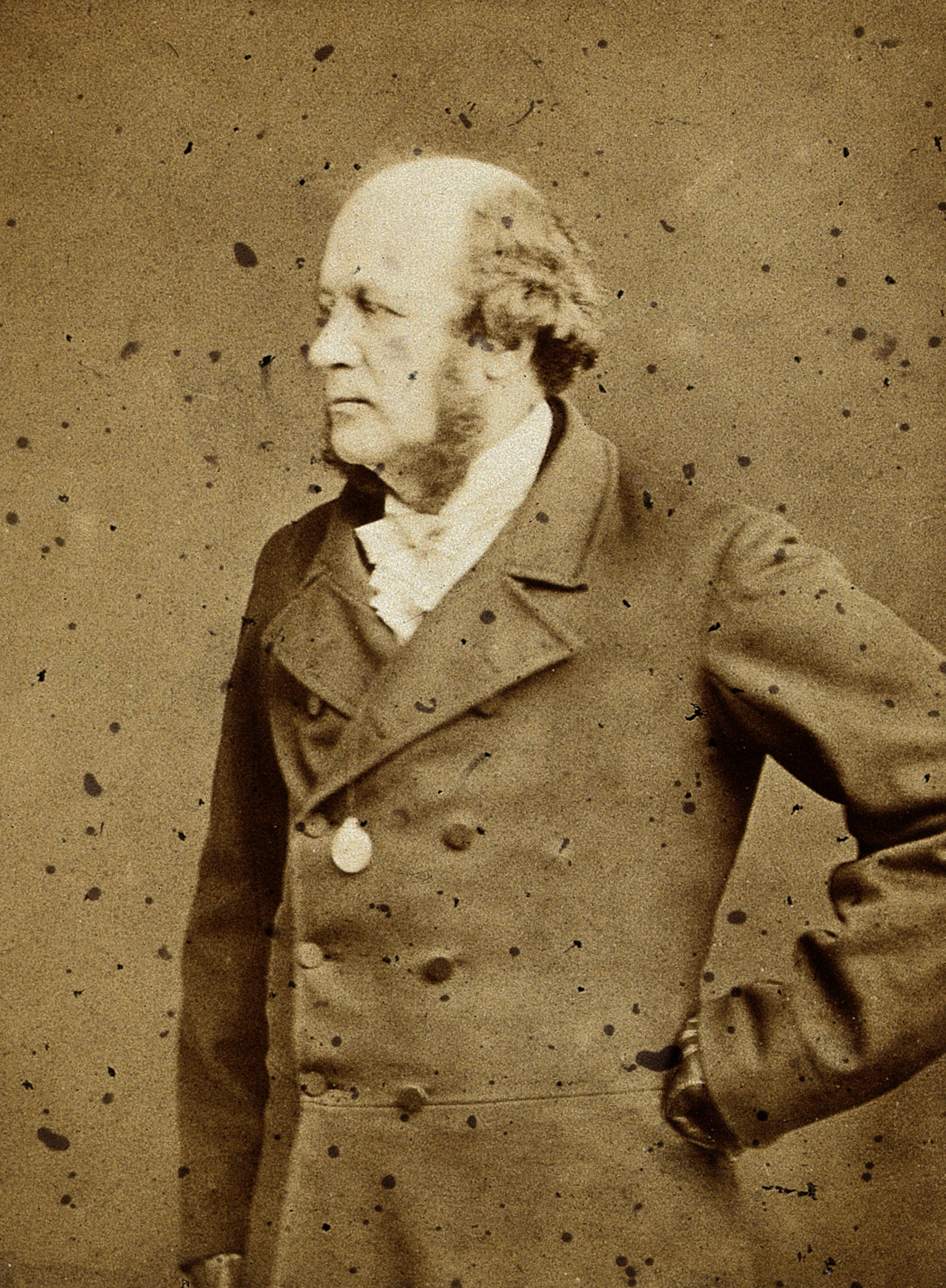
Thomas King Chambers in 1868

Thomas King Chambers (16 October 1817, London – 15 August 1889, Middlesex) was an English physician who published and lectured on diet and digestion. He was among the first to advocate medicine as a career for women. He was a founder and trustee of the London School of Medicine for Women.

== Biography ==
Thomas King Chambers was the fifth son of Robert Joseph Chambers, who was a police magistrate in London. Robert Joseph Chambers was an uncle of the physician William Frederick Chambers and a son of Sir Robert Chambers, Chief Justice of Bengal.

Thomas Chambers was educated at Rugby School under Thomas Arnold and at Shrewsbury School under Samuel Butler. After graduating from Christ Church, Oxford, with honours in classics, Chambers studied medicine at St George's Hospital and received the degree of B.M. at Oxford in 1842.

He obtained his Doctor of Medicine degree from the University of Oxford in 1846. On 16 December 1847 in Essex he married Henrietta Reavely Maitland (1827–1893). In 1848 he was elected a Fellow of the Royal College of Physicians.

He was appointed one of the three Senior Physicians at London's St Mary's Hospital upon its opening in 1851. Years later, he was appointed a consulting physician to the London Lock Hospital. He was also physician to the House of Charity in Soho.

In 1859 he was selected as physician in accompaniment to the Prince of Wales on a journey through Italy, Spain, and North Africa and seemed likely to gain a large, lucrative practice. However, Chambers developed a popliteal aneurysm in his left leg, which had to amputated through the thigh. After the amputation he continued to practise medicine, but in 1878 he developed a second aneurysm in his right leg — although he managed to avoid the leg's amputation. Because of his health problems, he retired to Sunningdale in 1878 but continued to visit London as physician employed by the Hand-in-Hand Insurance Office and as a member of the General Medical Council. From February 1882 until his death, he was one of the University of Oxford's representatives on the General Medical Council.

Chambers was a Censor at the Royal College of Physicians and delivered the Gulstonian Lectures in April and May 1850. He also gave the Lumleian Lectures in 1863 and the Harveian Oration in 1871.

Chambers was interested in educating the general public about dietetics. He contributed a 45-page appendix The principles of diet in health and disease to the 1879 American edition, edited by Eliza Ann Youmans, of a 1877 cookbook by Rose Owen Cole,

He worked, with considerable success, to improve medical education, especially the status of medicine at the University of Oxford and the professional value of its medical degrees. He lectured at the Working Men's College in Oakley Square.

One of his students was Walter John Coulson, F.R.C.S., who was a nephew of the surgeon William Coulson.

Chambers was an accomplished amateur oil painter, draughtsman, water-colourist, and wood carver. He was survived by his widow, their two daughters, Lucy and Alberta, and several grandchildren. The elder daughter, Lucy, was married to the artist Walter William Ouless.

== Selected publications ==
=== Articles ===
- Chambers, T. K. (1853). "Decennium Pathologicum; or, Contributions to the History of Chronic Disease, from the St. George's Hospital Records of Fatal Cases during Ten Years". The British and Foreign Medico-Chirurgical Review. 12 (24): 487–506. PMC 5186150. PMID 30164510.
- ——; Simon, John; Twining, Jun., T.; Calvert, F. Crace (1854). "Journal of the Society of Arts, Vol. 3, no. 112". The Journal of the Society of Arts. 3 (112): 119–132. JSTOR 41323546.
- —— (1857). "Experiments on Artificial Digestion" (PDF). The Lancet. 89 (1760): 522–524.
- —— (1861). "Clinical Lecture on Broncho-Pneumonia". British Medical Journal. 1 (5): 107–109. doi:10.1136/bmj.1.5.107. PMC 2288501. PMID 20743828.
- —— (1861). "Clinical Lecture on Hysteria: Given at St. Mary's Hospital, November 7th, 1861". British Medical Journal. 2 (51): 651–655. doi:10.1136/bmj.2.51.651. PMC 2288179. PMID 20743984.
- —— (1861). "Clinical Lecture on the Prognosis and Treatment of Thoracic Aneurism". British Medical Journal. 1 (3): 55–57. doi:10.1136/bmj.1.3.55. PMC 2287412. PMID 20743818.
- —— (1861). "Dr. Chambers Lecture on Gonorrhea and Imaginary Spermatorrhea" (PDF). The Lancet. 77 (1974): 635–637. doi:10.1016/S0140-6736(02)44854-4.
- —— (1862). "Lecture on the Importance of the Digestive Organs in Therapeutics". British Medical Journal. 1 (69): 427–428. doi:10.1136/bmj.1.69.427. PMC 2324491. PMID 20744046.
- —— (1863). "Statistics of the Treatment of Rheumatic Fever". British Medical Journal. 2 (139): 237. doi:10.1136/bmj.2.139.237. PMC 2325840.
- —— (1863). "Dr. Chambers and his Reviewer". British Medical Journal. 1 (120): 409–410. doi:10.1136/bmj.1.120.409-a. PMC 2324878.
- —— (1866). "Treatment of Rheumatic Fever". British Medical Journal. 1 (268): 187–188. doi:10.1136/bmj.1.268.187-a. PMC 2309021.
- —— (1871). "On Obscure Disease of the Cæcum". British Medical Journal. 1 (523): 6–7. doi:10.1136/bmj.1.523.6-a. PMC 2260322. PMID 20746068.
- —— (1873). "Lecture on Hypochondriasis". British Medical Journal. 2 (653): 6–8. doi:10.1136/bmj.2.653.6. PMC 2294346. PMID 20747142.
- —— (1878). "Shall Oxford Teach Medicine?". British Medical Journal. 1 (891): 140. doi:10.1136/bmj.1.891.140. PMC 2220476.

=== Books ===
- Chambers, Thomas King (1850). Corpulence: Or, Excess of Fat in the Human Body ... with an Appendix on Emaciation.
- —— (1856). Digestion and Its Derangements: The Principles of Rational Medicine Applied to Disorders of the Alimentary Canal.
- —— (1865). Lectures, Chiefly Clinical (4th ed.).
- —— (1865). Some Effects of the Climate of Italy.
- —— (1870). The Indigestions: Or, Diseases of the Digestive Organs Functionally Treated.
- —— (1875). A Manual of diet in health and disease.
