= George Beach (politician) =

American farmer, merchant, and politician

George Beach (born July 26, 1817 Winchester, died 1888 Litchfield County, Connecticut) was an American farmer, merchant and politician from New York.

== Life ==
The family removed in 1825 to a farm in Greene County, New York. He attended the district schools, and engaged in farming. Later he became a merchant in Catskill.

He was Supervisor of the Town of Jewett from 1855 to 1858; and was Chairman of the Board of Supervisors of Greene County from 1856 to 1858. He was a delegate to the 1860 and 1864 Democratic National Conventions. In July 1863, he was appointed as colonel of the 86th Regiment of the National Guard.

He was a member of the New York State Senate (10th D.) in 1864 and 1865. In July 1867, he was appointed brigadier general of the 8th Brigade, 5th Division, of the National Guard.

He was again a member of the State Senate (14th D.) in 1868 and 1869. In January 1870, he was appointed as a State Assessor.

== Sources ==
- The New York Civil List compiled by Franklin Benjamin Hough, Stephen C. Hutchins and Edgar Albert Werner (1870; pg. 420 and 443f)
- Life Sketches of the State Officers, Senators, and Members of the Assembly of the State of New York in 1868 by S. R. Harlow & S. C. Hutchins (pg. 61ff)
- Jewett Civil List transcribed at RootsWeb
- Green County Civil List transcribed at RootsWeb

New York State Senate
Preceded by Jacob S. Freer	New York State Senate; 10th District; 1864–1865	Succeeded by George Chambers
Preceded by Charles Stanford	New York State Senate; 14th District; 1868–1869	Succeeded by Jacob Hardenbergh
