= Hodges Mitchell =

Profile
- Position: Running back

Personal information
- Born: c. 1979

Career information
- College: Texas (1997–2000)

Hodges Mitchell (born c. 1979) is a former American football running back for the Texas Longhorns from 1997 to 2000. He had consecutive seasons in which he rushed for over 1,000 yards, tallying 1,343 yards in 1999 and 1,118 yards in 2000. He concluded his college career with 2,664 rushing yards and 743 receiving yards. He also held Texas records for carries in a game (45), single-game all-purpose yards (375), and career rushing yards (2,664). His suffered a career-ending knee injury in the 2000 Holiday Bowl on December 29, 2000. He later became a recreation supervisor in DeSoto, Texas.
