= Thomas Chambers (cricketer) =

South African cricketer (1931–2015)

Personal information
- Full name: Thomas William Chambers
- Born: 20 November 1931; Cape Town, South Africa
- Died: 8 June 2015 (aged 83); Port Elizabeth, South Africa
- Source: ESPNcricinfo, 19 July 2016

Thomas Chambers (20 November 1931 – 8 June 2015) was a South African cricketer. He played one first-class match for Eastern Province in 1956/57.
