= Jennifer Paige Chambers =

American musical theatre performer

Jennifer Paige Chambers (in the blue dress) with cast members of The Producers Los Angeles starring Jason Alexander (pictured) and Martin Short.

Jennifer Paige Chambers is a musical theatre performer, who has appeared in The Producers on Broadway with Nathan Lane and Matthew Broderick, in Los Angeles with Martin Short and Jason Alexander, and in the National Tour with Louis Stadlen and Don Stephenson. She had the chance to co-star as the Swedish secretary, Ulla, with Nathan Lane and Matthew Broderick.

She began her professional career at the age of 17, while still in high school, with an offer by Susan Stroman (The Producers, Oklahoma!, Contact, The Music Man, Steel Pier, Young Frankenstein, and others) to appear in Crazy for You. The show went to Berlin, Germany where she graduated from high school by correspondence. She then returned to the United States and continued on the 1st National Tour. Jennifer then went on to appear as Diane Lorimar in 42nd Street, choreographed by the great Jon Engstrom. Then at the age of 19, she appeared as Judy in A Chorus Line and worked alongside Mitzi Hamilton, Fran Liebergall and the legendary Cassie, Laurie Gamache. She went on to the 4th National Tour of the longest-running musical (of the time), Cats, as the Siamese cat Cassandra.

She has appeared as Purity in Anything Goes with Patti LuPone at Lincoln Center, and Copacabana with Barry Manilow. She then appeared as a legendary Radio City Rockette for three seasons in New York City on the great Radio City Music Hall stage. During her tenure with the Rockettes, she performed at the White House, appeared in several "Macy's Thanksgiving Day Parades," appeared in the tree lighting at Rockefeller Center, on the Today show, and in several print ads, such as Rosie magazine.

On television she has appeared as Paige Chambers on Sex and the City, Law and Order, Monk, and the Late Show with David Letterman (10 episodes), and national commercials for Levi's, Nissan, USA Today, and Sky Vodka.

She attended the Ivy League University of Pennsylvania where she was majoring in Philosophy, Politics, and Economics in the College of Liberal and Professional Studies, and minoring in legal studies at the Wharton School in conjunction with the School of Arts and Sciences. She graduated from Penn's College of Liberal and Professional Studies in 2010 and plans to become an attorney. Currently, she is working as co- director and an instructor at Chambers Performing Arts, which was established by Susan Chambers in 1980. Paige is also a tap trainer for the Broadway show and National tours of the second most Tony Award-winning show in Broadway history, Billy Elliot.
