= Dominic Chambers =

English cricketer (born 1984)

Personal information
- Full name: Dominic James Chambers
- Born: 6 January 1984 (age 42); Canterbury, Kent
- Batting: Right-handed
- Bowling: Slow left arm orthodox

Domestic team information
- Years: Team
- 2006: Kent
- Only FC: 17 May 2006 Kent v Cambridge UCCE
- Source: CricInfo, 12 August 2022

Dominic James Chambers (born 6 January 1984) is former English professional cricketer. He played one first-class cricket match for Kent County Cricket Club during the 2006 season, and remained a squad member for 2007.

Chambers was born in Canterbury, Kent and educated at St Edmund's School in the city.

Chambers made 11 Second XI appearances for Kent's Second XI in 2003 before making his first-class debut against Cambridge UCCE in May 2006 at Fenner's. He scored 12 runs and took one catch during the match, going on to make two final appearances for the Second XI in 2008. In local cricket he played for Chestfield, Folkestone, St Lawrence and Highland and Canterbury Cricket Clubs in the Kent Cricket League. He was the league's Young Cricketer of the Year in 2008.
