= Liam Chambers =

Irish historian and academic

Liam Chambers is an Irish historian and academic.

== Overview ==
Chambers writes on political, religious and social aspects of Irish culture during the 18th century, with special attention to Irish migration to continental Europe in that era.

Liam Chambers’ research interests include the political, social, cultural and religious history of eighteenth century Ireland. He is especially interested in the history of Irish migration to continental Europe in the early modern period, and the history of ideas. He has contributed entries for biographical dictionaries, such as the Oxford Dictionary of National Biography.

Chambers is Senior Lecturer and Head of the Department of History at Mary Immaculate College, University of Limerick.

== Bibliography ==
=== Articles ===
- The Defenders in Kildare: their origins, nature and United Irish links in Retrospect: Journal of the Irish History Students Association (1997), pp 4–12.
- John Esmonde c.1760-1798, George Lube, Laurence O’Connor in Seamus Cullen and Hermann Geissel (eds), Fugitive Warfare: 1798 in North Kildare, CRS Publications, Clane (1998), pp 86–93, 101-4, 124-30.
- Defying Descartes: Michael Moore (1639-1726) and Aristotelianism in Ireland and France, in Michael Brown and Stephen Harrison (eds), The Medieval World and the Modern Mind, Four Courts Press, Dublin (2000), pp 11–26.
- The State Solicitor’s Report on the 1803 Rebellion in County Kildare in Journal of the County Kildare Archaeological Society, vol. xix (part 1) (2000–2001), pp 217–26.
- A Displaced Intelligentsia: Aspects of Irish Catholic Thought in Ancien Régime France in Thomas O’Connor (ed.), The Irish in Europe 1580-1815 Four Courts Press, Dublin (2001), pp 157–74.
- Knowledge and Piety: Michael Moore’s Career at the University of Paris and Collège de France, 1701-20 in Eighteenth-Century Ireland, vol. 17 (2002), pp 9–25.
- The 1798 Rebellion in North Leinster in Thomas Bartlett, David Dickson, Daire Keogh and Kevin Whelan (eds), 1798: A Bicentenary Perspective Four Courts Press, Dublin (2003), pp 122–36.
- "A More General and Rooted Spirit of Disaffection: The 1803 Rebellion in Kildare" in History Ireland, vol. 11, no. 3 (2003), pp 20–5.
- Irish Catholics, French Cartesians: Irish Reactions to Cartesianism in France, 1671-1726 in Eamon Maher and Grace Neville (eds), France-Ireland: Anatomy of a Relationship, Frankfurt am Main (2004), pp 133–45.
- The Library of an Irish Catholic Émigré: Michael Moore’s Bibliothèque, 1726, in Archivium Hibernicum, vol. lviii (2004), pp 210–42.
- Patrick O’Kelly and the Interpretation of the 1798 Rebellion in County Kildare in William Nolan and Thomas McGrath (eds), Kildare:History and Society, Geography Publications, Dublin (2006), pp 439–459.
- Rivalry and Reform in the Irish College, Paris, 1676-1775, Thomas O’Connor and Mary Ann Lyons (eds), Irish Communities in Early Modern Europe, Four Courts Press Dublin (2006), pp 103–129.
- Irish Fondations and Boursiers in Early Modern Paris, 1682-1793 in Irish Economic and Social History, vol. 35 (2008), 1-22.
- Adapting Early Modern Ireland, review, in Eighteenth Century Ireland 24 (2009), pp 164–175.
- Irish Catholics and Aristotelian Scholastic Philosophy in Early Modern France, c.1600-c.1750 in James McEvoy and Michael Dunne (eds), The Irish Contribution to European Scholastic Thought Four Courts Press, Dublin (2009), pp 312–30.
- Revolutionary and Refractory? The Irish Colleges in Paris and the French Revolution in Journal of Irish and Scottish Studies, vol. 2, no. 1 (2008), pp 29–51. [A special edition titled Gallic Connections: Irish & Scottish Encounters with France, published 2009]
- (with John Bergin) The Library of Denis Molony (1650-1726), An Irish Catholic Lawyer in London, in Analecta Hibernica, vol. 41 (2009), pp 83–132.
- Une Seconde Patrie: The Irish Colleges, Paris, in the Eighteenth and Nineteenth Centuries, in Susanne Lachenicht and Kirsten Heinsohn (eds), Diaspora Identities: Exile, Nationalism and Cosmopoitanism in Past and Present, Frankfurt/New York City, Campus/University of Chicago Press, (2009), pp 16–30.
- Miracles and Medicine in the Late Seventeenth Century: Bernard Connor’s Evangelium Medici (1697), in Fiona Clark (ed.), Ireland and Medicine in the Seventeenth and Eighteenth Centuries (Aldershot: Ashgate, 2010), pp 53–72.

=== Books ===
- Rebellion in Kildare 1790-1803, Four Courts Press, Dublin (1998).
- Michael Moore c.1639-1726: Provost of Trinity, Rector of Paris, Four Courts Press, Dublin (2005)
