= Erika Chambers =

British-Israeli Mossad operative (born 1948)

- Born: 1948 (age 77–78); United Kingdom
- Other name: Agent Penelope
- Education: University of Southampton, Hebrew University of Jerusalem
- Occupation: Charity worker
- Known for: Assassination of Ali Hassan Salameh (1979)
- Espionage activity
- Agency: Mossad
- Codename: Penelope

Erika Chambers (Hebrew: אריקה צ'יימברס; born 1948), also known as Agent Penelope, is a British-Israeli Mossad operative behind the action on 22 January 1979 that killed Ali Hassan Salameh, leader of Black September and lead plotter behind the Munich massacre.

== Biography ==
According to Israeli journalist Ronen Bergman's book Rise and Kill First, Erika Chambers was born in the United Kingdom in 1948 to Marcus Chambers, an engineer who designed racing cars, and Lona, a singer and actress from a wealthy Czechoslovak Jewish family, most of whom were killed in the Holocaust. After studying at the University of Southampton, she moved to Australia before moving to Israel and studying hydrology at the Hebrew University of Jerusalem. In 1973, she was recruited by the Mossad. In 1975, she assumed a false British identity and began participating in Mossad operations.

== Munich Massacre ==
During the 1972 Summer Olympics in Munich, eight members of Black September took hostage and ultimately killed 11 members of the Israeli Olympic team.

== Mossad assassinations following the Munich massacre ==
In response, Israel planned the assassination of those suspected of planning the operation. Ali Hassan Salameh, the leader of Black September and purported architect of the Munich Massacre, was one of those targeted. He was assassinated on 22 January 1979.

== Assassination of Salameh ==
After making five unsuccessful attempts on Salameh, Mossad recognised it needed a different approach. From October 1978 over a period of six weeks, agents noted that Salameh spent most afternoons with his wife, former Miss Universe Georgina Rizk, at her apartment in Snoubra, West Beirut, and when not in meetings spent time at the gym and at a sauna. After planning a bomb attack on the sauna, the plan was vetoed due to the potential for an excessive number of civilian casualties.

In November 1978, a British based charity worker named Erika Mary Chambers, travelling on a 1975 issued British passport, entered Beirut. It is also believed that several other Mossad agents entered Beirut at the time, including two using the aliases Peter Scriver and Roland Kolberg, travelling with British and Canadian passports, respectively.

Erika Chambers, known as "Agent Penelope" by Mossad, came with a back story of graduating from the University of Southampton. In her early 30s and resident in the UK, she joined British-based arms of welfare organisations supporting Palestinian refugees in Lebanon and was subsequently invited to Beirut.

Mossad agents noted that Salameh would often travel down Beka Street from his apartment nearby. On 10 January 1979, Chambers paid £L3,500 to rent an apartment on the eighth floor of the Anis Assaf building. Bohemian in appearance, Chambers was seen as eccentric by her fellow apartment block residents, and would spend her time rescuing stray cats and painting street scenes from the balcony of her flat, overlooking Beka Street and Rue Verdun.

Once resident and working with a Palestinian charity named The House of Steadfastness of the children of Telsata, she engineered a meeting with Salameh. After taking a liking to her, Salameh took Chambers to various functions, and as a result of getting close to Salameh she learned his detailed daily routine.

On 22 January 1979, Salameh was in a convoy of two Chevrolet station wagons headed from Rizk's flat to his mother's for a birthday party. Chambers was on her balcony painting, with her red Volkswagen parked below on Rue Verdun. As Salameh's convoy passed the Volkswagen at 3:35 pm and turned onto Rue Madame Curie, 100kg of explosive attached to the car by a fellow Mossad agent was remotely exploded, either by Chambers or on her notification to another Mossad agent.

Salameh was alive but mortally wounded, having a piece of steel metal shrapnel embedded in his head. He was rushed to the American University Hospital, where he died on the operating table at 4:03 pm. Eight other people were killed in the explosion, four of his bodyguards and four bystanders, including a West German nun and a British secretary named Susan Wareham. Eighteen other people in the vicinity were also injured.

The explosion shook Beirut, and was seen by Mossad agent Mike Harari from a boat off the coast. Immediately following the operation, the three Mossad officers fled without a trace, as did up to 14 other agents believed to have been involved.

Salameh was buried in front of a crowd of 100,000 mourners in Beirut's Martyr's Cemetery. Yasser Arafat was one of the pallbearers, and amid chaos commented that "We will continue to march on the road to Palestine. Goodbye, my hero."

== Postscript ==
=== British passports ===
In 1986, an Israeli embassy worker was picked up in West Germany by an unknown agency with a bag that contained fake British passports. The information was passed to the UK Government, and subsequently, Foreign Office Minister Timothy Renton met with Israeli ambassador Yehuda Avner in October 1986 about "misuse by the Israeli authorities of forged British passports."

On 16 March 1987, the Sunday Times ran the story, stating that the fake documents were intended to help agents of the Israeli secret service attack foes abroad. As an example, the newspaper stated that fake British passports were used by Israeli agents in both Operation Spring of Youth and by Erika Chambers. The article stated that Israel later apologised and promised not to do it again.

Approaching Renton for comment, as is procedure, he directed the newspaper to the Foreign and Commonwealth Office, which refused to comment.

=== Wilhelm Dietl ===
After his exposure as an agent of West Germany's secret service the Bundesnachrichtendienst, journalist Wilhelm Dietl wrote a series of books, including an autobiography revealing his activities. One book was about a Mossad agent he called Erika Chambers, to whom he also devoted a chapter in another book:

Her character fascinated me. I was in Beirut and met PLO people, and they always talked about the operation she took part in. Chambers was the Mossad agent who in 1979 killed Ali Hassan Salameh, who was one of [Yasser] Arafat's assistants - a Palestinian playboy and the operations officer of Black September. He was one of the planners of the murder of the Israeli athletes at the Munich Olympics. She pressed the button of the remote control that set off the bomb, which had been placed along the route Salameh was driving. The later investigation carried out by the PLO found that she had left behind her a trail of addresses in Geneva and Germany, and therefore thought she had done so deliberately so the PLO would believe, mistakenly, that the action was perpetrated by the BND, or that the BND was an accomplice to it, in revenge for Munich.

According to Dietl's testimony, Chambers was a British citizen who studied hydrology in Australia. She arrived at the Hebrew University of Jerusalem in her early 20s to continue her studies, and was recruited by Mossad.

=== Naming of Chambers ===
In the run up to the release of the Steven Spielberg's film Munich, the BBC's This World programme on 24 January 2006, named Chambers as the British woman who detonated the bomb.
