= Bruce Chambers (American football) =

American football player and coach

Playing career
- 1979–1982: North Texas
- Position: Wide receiver

Coaching career (HC unless noted)
- 1984–1985: Dallas Carter HS (TX) (assistant freshmen)
- 1986–1988: Dallas Carter HS (TX) (assistant JV)
- 1989–1992: Dallas Carter HS (TX) (DC)
- 1993–1995: Dallas Carter HS (TX) (OC)
- 1996–1997: Dallas Carter HS (TX)
- 1998–2002: Texas (RB)
- 2003: Texas (TE)
- 2004: Texas (AHC/TE)
- 2005–2012: Texas (TE/co-RC)
- 2013: Texas (TE/RC)
- 2014: Texas (TE)

Administrative career (AD unless noted)
- 1996–1998: Dallas Carter HS (TX)
- 2015–present: Arlington ISD (TX) (assistant AD)

Head coaching record
- Overall: 18–6 (high school)

Bruce Chambers is an assistant athletic director at Arlington ISD and an American football coach. He most recently served as an assistant to Charlie Strong at the University of Texas at Austin, and was the only member of the coaching staff retained from Mack Brown's staff. Previously he served as coach at David W. Carter High School in Dallas, Texas. After being dismissed from the staff on December 31, 2014, Chambers was hired by Arlington ISD as assistant athletic director.

Chambers played wide receiver at the University of North Texas under Jerry Moore, Bob Tyler and Corky Nelson. He then became coach at Dallas Carter High School, coaching the freshmen and junior varsity before becoming varsity assistant to Freddie James in 1989. In 1996 Chambers succeeded James as head coach, but chose to leave the school after two seasons for an assistant job at Texas.

In his first five seasons at Texas, Chambers coached three of the nine 1,000-yard rushers (Ricky Williams, 1998 / Hodges Mitchell, 1999–2000 / Cedric Benson, 2001–02) in school history and became the first position coach since Fred Akers (with Roosevelt Leaks and Earl Campbell in '73 and '74-75, respectively) to have two different backs earn first-team all-conference honors in three consecutive seasons (Williams, 1998 / Mitchell, 1999–2000).

After Chambers transitioned to tight ends coach, he worked with many players who would end up in the NFL from 2003-2014 including: David Thomas, Bo Scaife, Jermichael Finley, and Geoff Swaim.
