= Nick Chambers =

American stand-up comedian (born 1985)

- Born: Nicholas Alexander Chambers; March 15, 1985 (age 41); Worcester, MA, United States

Comedy career
- Years active: 2009–present
- Medium: Stand-up; film; graphic design; illustration
- Genres: Observational comedy; satire
- Subjects: Everyday life; human interaction; human behavior
- Website: www.chamberscomedy.com

Nick Chambers is an American stand-up comedian, actor, storyteller, songwriter and motion graphics artist. He is currently performing stand-up comedy in a number of venues weekly all across New England.

== Education ==
Chambers received a Bachelor of Arts degree in Illustration and Animation from the Art Institute of Boston at Lesley University.

== Stand-up career ==
Chambers started his career at an open mic in a downtown Boston comedy club venue on his birthday in 2009 and is currently performing regularly in clubs across New England.

=== Stage Time Comedy Club ===
Between 2012 and 2015, Chambers founded and ran the Stage Time Comedy Club with weekly shows in Worcester, Massachusetts alongside comedians Shaun Connolly, Doug Guertin, and Ryan Staples. James Creelman was a regular on the show and always left the audience in stitches. Chambers has performed with national headliners such as Cameron Esposito, Kyle Dunnigan and Bridget Everett.

=== The Comedy Studio ===
Chambers is a regular performer at The Comedy Studio at Harvard Square in Cambridge, MA and was chosen to be Comic-in-Residence for August in 2014. As Comic-in-Residence, comedians open each show at the club for the entire month.

== Acting career ==
As an actor, Chambers appears in the feature films Good Kids , Hedgehog and was cast in the lead role of the drama It's Not Funny Anymore. In 2016, he also appeared in the Visa commercial "Race to Kickoff".

=== Old School Game Show ===
In 2015, Chambers joined the cast of the Boston-based Old School Game Show, an alt-trivia variety show which takes place monthly at OBERON in Cambridge, MA. He writes, produces, and performs content for song-based games during the show. On February 4, 2017, Old School Game Show appeared at Boston's historic Wilbur Theatre.

=== The 90's Party ===
With Felicia Morgan, Chambers began The 90's Party, an annual celebration of music, fashion, and pop culture from the 1990s. Together, they produced a number of videos promoting the event beginning in 2013.

== Side projects ==
=== Fake Song Friday ===
Since June 2015, every Friday on Instagram, Chambers posts 15-second music videos for songs he composed based on vintage photos. These photos are provided by comedian Ken Reid, who collects them from estate sales and flea markets.
