= Shireen Chambers =

British forester (born 1962)

Shireen Chambers MBE FICFor
- Born: 21 February 1962 (age 64); Belfast, Northern Ireland
- Education: Bangor University
- Employer: Future Woodlands Scotland

Shireen Grace Chambers MBE FICFor (born 21 February 1962) is a British forester and the CEO of Future Woodlands Scotland.

== Early life and education ==
Chambers studied forestry and soil science at Bangor University and graduated in 1985. She moved to The Bahamas, where she helped to establish a forestry department. She returned to the United Kingdom in 1991, when she joined the Central Scotland Forest Trust.

== Career ==
Chambers was appointed CEO of Future Woodlands Scotland in 2022, a Scottish conservation charity working to create and conserve native woodlands and greenspaces.

Prior to joining Future Woodlands Scotland, she was executive director of the Institute of Chartered Foresters (2006–2022). She was made a Fellow of the Institute of Chartered Foresters in 2012. She was awarded an honorary fellowship from Bangor University in 2015. Chambers has outlined how forestry can help to support sustainable, low carbon farming. She has spoken about the need for the public to be aware of the damage that can be caused by imported pests and disease in UK forests.

In 2017 Chambers was made chair of the Board of Trustees of Tree Aid, which she led until 2023. In her capacity as Chair she visited Burkina Faso to understand he impact of trees in rural communities. Inspired by her time in Burkina Faso Chambers established dryland developments in the United Kingdom. She serves as a member of the Forestry Strategy Reference Group.

Chambers has worked to improve the representation of women in forestry. She launched the Institute of Chartered Foresters campaign "#ILookLikeAForester" in March 2019. She was awarded a Member of the Order of the British Empire (MBE) for services to forestry in 2019. Under her leadership the Institute of Chartered Foresters has doubled member numbers.
