= Olivene Chambers =

Jamaican educator (1925–2019)

Olivene Elfreda Louise Chambers (21 April 1925 – May 2019, née Patterson) was a Jamaican educator.

== Early life and education ==
Chambers was born on 21 April 1925 in Bunker's Hill, Trelawny Parish, Jamaica. Her father was a butcher and farmer, and her mother a seamstress. She attended Unity All-Age School and Bethlehem Teachers' College, and began her teaching career in the mid-1940s at Tweedside Primary School. She studied independently for A-level examinations and then gained a degree in education at the University of the West Indies in 1951.

She married Alvin S. Chambers on 15 April 1953, and they moved to Brown's Town, Saint Ann Parish, a year later.

== Career ==
Chambers taught at Browns Town Primary School, where by 1968 she was supervising trainee teachers on one-year internships from colleges around the island. In 1971 she was a senior lecturere in English at Moneague Teachers' College, and the following year she was awarded a year's scholarship to study reading and curriculum development at Carleton University in Canada. In 1973 she was appointed as head teacher at Brown's Town Secondary School, now Brown's Town High School, and held that post until 1978. During her time there she implemented a two-shift system to enable the school to cope with rising student numbers.

After retirement Chambers remained an active member of her church, Brown's Town Baptist Church.

== Recognition and awards ==
Chambers was honoured with several awards including the Prime Minister's Medal of Appreciation for Service in Education (1983), the Merit Award for Service to Education from Jamaica Baptist Union (1989), and Jamaica Chamber of Commerce Award for dedicated service to the teaching profession (1994).
