= Jocelyn Chambers =

American composer

Jocelyn Chambers is an American composer and author living in Austin, Texas.

== Early life and education ==
Jocelyn Chambers started playing piano at the age of 7 and at the age of 13 started piano lessons with Rachel McInturff at the Armstrong Community Music School in Austin, TX. In 2011 Chambers won the Austin Symphony Orchestra’s second Texas Young Composers Concert. She returned to compete in the same program in 2012 with her composition titled "Paradise" which describes a couple in romantic love.

== Career ==
Chambers is the author of The Era of Mixed Feelings which is collection of personal stories from authors from 12 to 22 as they talk about their struggles with adolescence. She is also the creator of a bi-annual online magazine dedicated to image and interviews of young women of color called Majesty.
