= Christine Chambers =

Canadian psychologist

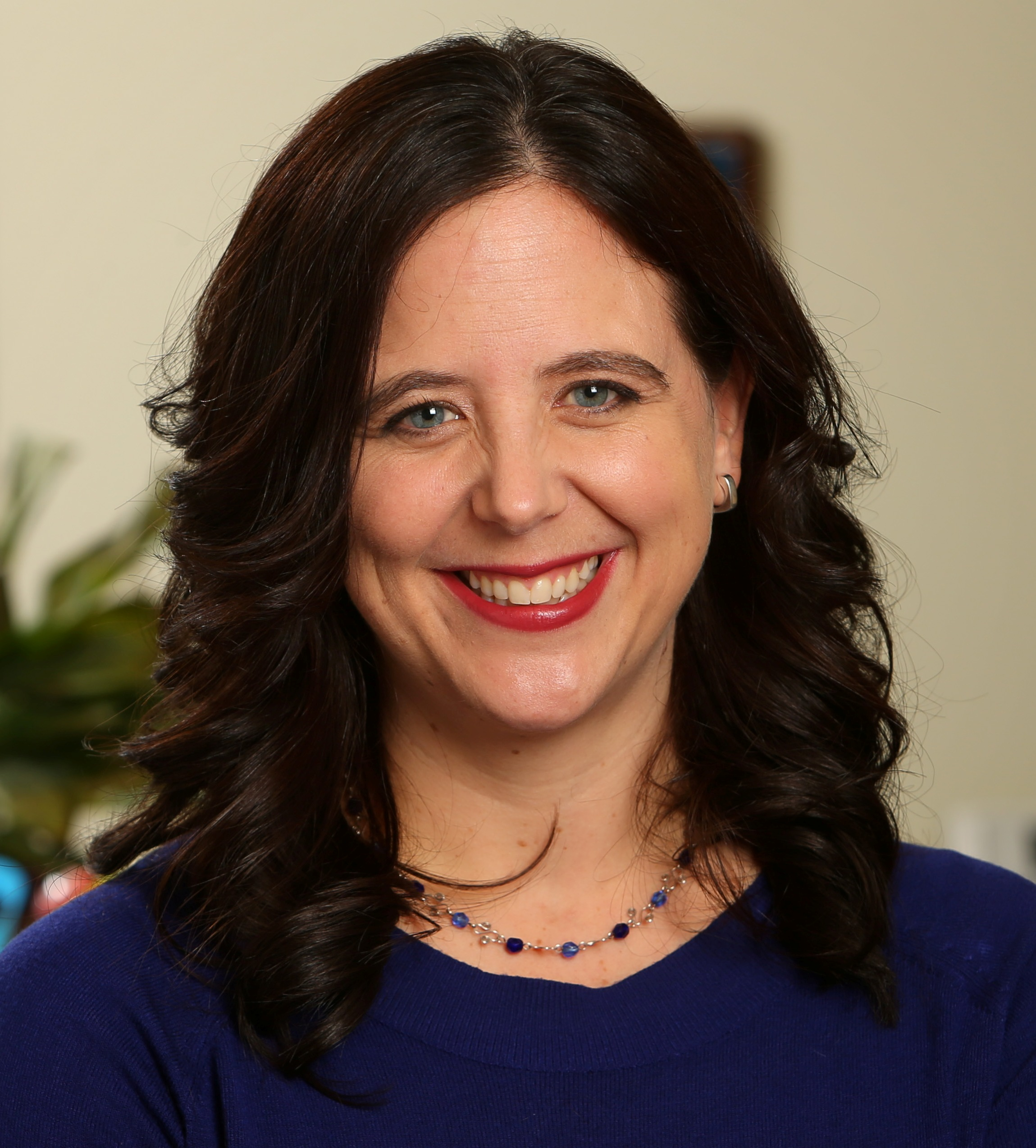
- Born: Christine Therese Chambers
- Education: Dalhousie University (BSc); University of British Columbia (MA, PhD)
- Known for: It Doesn't Have To Hurt
- Scientific career
- Fields: Pediatric Pain; Parents & Families; Implementation Science; Knowledge Translation; Health psychology
- Workplaces: Dalhousie University
- Thesis: The impact of maternal behaviour on children's pain experiences: An experimental analysis (2001)
- Doctoral advisor: Kenneth D. Craig
- Website: pediatric-pain.ca/faculty/christine-chambers

Christine Therese Chambers is a Canadian clinical psychologist at Dalhousie University. She holds a Tier 1 Canada Research Chair in Children's Pain.

== Education ==
Chambers became interested in psychology as a child. She completed her undergraduate degree at Dalhousie University. She spent her summers at the IWK Health Centre. She joined the University of British Columbia for her graduate studies (MA, PhD), working with Kenneth D. Craig on pain.

== Research and career ==
At Dalhousie University, Chambers works in the Centre for Paediatric Pain Research. She serves as Assistant Director of the North American Pain School. She leads a large research team of doctoral students and research staff, studying the developmental, social and psychological influences on children's pain. A 2012 analysis of the research productivity of clinical psychology professors in Canada identified Chambers in the top-ten list for most productive women.

Chambers has served on the scientific programming committee for the International Association for the Study of Pain in 2014 and 2016. She is a member of the council for the IASP. In 2014 Chambers spoke at TEDxMount Allison University. She has been a Tier 1 Canada Research Chair in Children's Pain since 2015. She specializes in chronic pain and is interested in how scientists can use social media to promote their research. Chambers is the secretary of the board of directors for the Society of Pediatric Psychology, She took part in Soapbox Science in 2018.

In 2019, Chambers was announced as the new Scientific Director of the CIHR Institute of Human Development, Child and Youth Health, effective January 2020.

=== It Doesn't Have to Hurt ===
Chambers is the principal investigator of It Doesn’t Have to Hurt (#ItDoesntHaveToHurt), an information platform supported by the Canadian Institutes of Health Research. The platform brings together parents, researchers and experts in digital media to communicate evidence about how young people experience pain. They use integrated knowledge translation to better connect to their audience. They work with Erica Ehm's Yummy Mummy Club to create informative social media campaigns. She contributes to the magazine Parents Canada. Their social media work generated hundreds of millions of impressions and the group several won awards for their campaigning. They held a knowledge transfer event at Twitter in Canada in 2016. She developed a YouTube video to talk about ways to make injections less painful for children.

=== Awards and honors ===
She was awarded the International Association for the Study of Pain (IASP) Ulf Lindblom Young Investigator Award in 2010. Chambers was awarded the American Pain Society Jeffrey Lawson Award in 2016.
