= Erin Wolf Chambers =

American computer scientist

Erin Moriarty Wolf Chambers is an American computer scientist, the Snyder Family Mission Collegiate Professor of Computer Science at the University of Notre Dame, with a concurrent appointment in the Department of Applied and Computational Mathematics and Statistics. Her research concerns computational geometry and computational topology

== Education and career ==
Chambers was a student at the University of Illinois Urbana-Champaign, where she received a bachelor's degree in computer science with a minor in mathematics in 2002, a master's degree in mathematics in 2006, and a Ph.D. in computer science in 2008. Her doctoral dissertation, Finding Interesting Topological Features, was supervised by Jeff Erickson.

She became an assistant professor in the Department of Mathematics and Computer Science at Saint Louis University in 2008. In 2013 this department split, and she became an associate professor in the Department of Computer Science. She was promoted to professor in 2018, and chaired the department from 2022 to 2024. In 2024 she moved to her present position as Snyder Family Mission Collegiate Professor of Computer Science at the University of Notre Dame.
