= Ted Chambers =

American football and soccer coach (1900–1992)

Biographical details
- Born: November 6, 1900; Union, West Virginia, U.S.
- Died: April 14, 1992 (aged 91); Washington, D.C., U.S.

Playing career

Football
- 1920: Howard

Coaching career (HC unless noted)

Football
- 1926–1928: Manassas Industrial (VA)
- 1944: Howard

Soccer
- ?: Howard

Head coaching record
- Overall: 1–4 (college football); 104–27–11 (college soccer)

James T. "Ted" Chambers (November 6, 1900 – April 14, 1992) was an American football and soccer coach. He served as the head football coach at his alma mater, Howard University in Washington, D.C., in 1944, compiling a record of 1–4. He also began the school's soccer program.

One of his first coaching assignments was at the Manassas Industrial School for Colored Youth.

Chambers was born in Union, West Virginia. He earned a master's degree in physical education from the University of Pittsburgh. Chambers died on April 14, 1992, at the Walter Reed Army Medical Center in Washington, D.C. after suffering from pneumonia and heart ailments.

== Head coaching record ==
=== College football ===
Year	Team	Overall	Conference	Standing	Bowl/playoffs
Howard Bison (Colored Intercollegiate Athletic Association) (1944)
1944	Howard	1–4	1–2	6th	
Howard:		1–4	1–2		
Total:		1–4			
