= Phil Chambers (footballer) =

English footballer (born 1953)

Personal information
- Full name: Philip Martin Chambers
- Date of birth: 10 November 1953 (age 72)
- Place of birth: Barnsley, England
- Height: 5 ft 7 in (1.70 m)
- Position: Left back

Senior career*
Years	Team	Apps	(Gls)
1971–1985	Barnsley	442	(7)
1985	Rochdale	10	(0)
1985–1986	Hartlepool United	29	(0)
Total		481	(7)

International career
- England schoolboys

Managerial career
- 1993: Scarborough
- * Club domestic league appearances and goals

Philip Martin Chambers (born 10 November 1953) is an English former professional footballer who played as a left back.

Having previously joined the Barnsley groundstaff as an apprentice, he became signed a professional contract in November 1971. He had previously played for the England schoolboys team. He made 442 league appearances across 14 years at the club, and was part of the Barnsley team that finished as Third Division runners-up in 1980–81, and thus were promoted to the Second Division.

After leaving Barnsley in summer 1985, he played 10 matches for Rochdale on non-contract terms, before joining Hartlepool United in November 1985 where he made 29 appearances. He was later a youth coach at both Rotherham United and Scarborough, and had a spell managing the latter in 1993, before working at a bacon factory in Barnsley.
