= Rebecca Ballard Chambers =

American newspaper editor and temperance worker

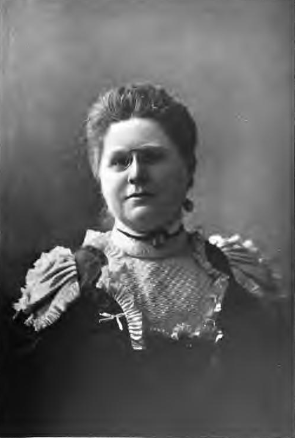
- Born: Rebecca Lavinia Ballard; March 29, 1858; Ohio, U.S.
- Died: April 14, 1920 (aged 62); West Grove, Pennsylvania, U.S.
- Education: Putnam Female Seminary
- Occupations: journalist; social reformer; newspaper editor-in-chief
- Spouse: Samuel Kemble Chambers (m. 1877; died 1917)
- Children: 2 daughters
- Writing career
- Language: English

Rebecca Ballard Chambers (née, Ballard; March 29, 1858 – April 14, 1920) was an American journalist and social reformer. She served as the editor-in-chief of the Bulletin, a temperance movement newspaper in Pennsylvania, and as president of the state's branch of the Woman's Christian Temperance Union (WCTU).

== Biography ==
Rebecca Lavinia Ballard was born in Ohio, March 29, 1858. She was educated at the Putnam Female Seminary of that state.

Chambers first entered reform work during the "crusade" in 1873, being herself an "original crusader", with her mother, who was secretary of the Canton Crusaders. In October 1900, at Uniontown, Pennsylvania, while serving as State President of the Pennsylvania WCTU, she delivered the annual address to the attending delegates. At the time, the state membership totalled 16,607, with 13,000 additional members of young women and the children's union.

She married Samuel Kemble Chambers (d. 1917) in 1877, president of the West Grove National Bank. They had two daughters, Mary and Helen.

== Death and legacy ==
She died at her home in West Grove, Pennsylvania, April 14, 1920. Interment was at the cemetery adjoining the West Grove Presbyterian Church, in West Grove.

Her papers, including her 1875-76 Putnam Seminary book, as well as European travel diaries and ephemera of 1895 and 1900, are held by the Historical Society of Pennsylvania.
