= Joseph N. Chambers =

American politician and army officer (1798–1874)

Joseph N. Chambers (1798–1874) was an American politician and army officer. Chambers was born in Maryland and graduated in 1818 from the United States Military Academy. He then served as a lieutenant until his resignation in 1823. He was later elected as a Member of the House of Representatives of Louisiana. Chambers died on November 12, 1874, in Clinton, Louisiana.

== Military career ==
He was appointed from his home state of Maryland as Cadet at the United States Military Academy on January 1, 1814, and graduated June 24, 1818. He served in the Army from 1818 to 1823 as Second and First Lieutenant and resigned on November 6, 1823.
