= John Chambers (Australian cricketer) =

Australian cricketer (1930–2017)

Personal information
- Born: 30 October 1930; Geelong, Australia
- Died: 12 September 2017 (aged 86)

Domestic team information
- Years: Team
- 1950-1955: Victoria
- Source: Cricinfo, 9 May 2018

John Chambers (30 October 1930 – 12 September 2017) was an Australian cricketer. He played 27 first-class cricket matches for Victoria between 1950 and 1955.

== See also ==
- List of Victoria first-class cricketers
