= Robert Chambers (cricketer) =

English cricketer

Personal information
- Full name: Robert Edwin Jeffery Chambers
- Born: 19 November 1943 (age 82); Bexhill-on-Sea, Sussex, England
- Batting: Right-handed
- Bowling: Right-arm off break

Domestic team information
- Years: Team
- 1972–1974: Hertfordshire
- 1969: Staffordshire
- 1966: Cambridge University

Career statistics
Competition	First-class
Matches	12
Runs scored	386
Batting average	17.54
100s/50s	–/3
Top score	58
Balls bowled	5
Wickets	–
Bowling average	–
5 wickets in innings	–
10 wickets in match	–
Best bowling	–
Catches/stumpings	9/–
- Source: Cricinfo, 29 April 2012

Robert Edwin Jeffery Chambers (born 19 November 1943) is a former English cricketer. Chambers was a right-handed batsman who bowled right-arm off break. He was born at Bexhill-on-Sea, Sussex, and was educated at the Forest School, Walthamstow.

While attending the University of Cambridge, Chambers made his first-class debut for Cambridge University Cricket Club against Scotland at Fenner's in 1966. In what was his only season of first-class cricket, Chambers made eleven further first-class appearances for the university, the last of which came against Oxford University in The University Match at Lord's. In his twelve first-class appearances for the university, he scored 386 runs at an average of 17.54, with a high score of 58. One of three half centuries he made in that season, this score came against Somerset.

He later made a single appearance Staffordshire against Cheshire in the 1969 Minor Counties Championship. He later joined Hertfordshire, making his debut for the county in the 1972 Minor Counties Championship against Cambridgeshire. He made fourteen further appearances for the county in Minor counties cricket, the last of which came against Buckinghamshire in 1974.
