= Wylie Chambers =

Australian rules footballer

Personal information
- Full name: Wylie Chambers
- Born: 4 October 1928
- Died: 9 August 1953 (aged 24); Royal Melbourne Hospital
- Original team: Williamstown Presbyterians
- Height: 185 cm (6 ft 1 in)
- Weight: 80 kg (176 lb)

Playing career^{1}
| Years | Club | Games (Goals) |
| 1946–1950 | South Melbourne | 48 (7) |
- ^{1} Playing statistics correct to the end of 1950.

Wylie Chambers (4 October 1928 – 9 August 1953) was an Australian rules footballer who played with South Melbourne in the Victorian Football League (VFL).

A utility from Williamstown Presbyterians, Chambers was just 17 when he made his VFL debut in 1946.

After playing 11 games in his first season, he found himself stuck in the seconds during 1947 and requested for a transfer to Williamstown, which was refused by South Melbourne.

Chambers, who was often used as a fullback, put together regular appearances in the seniors over the next three seasons before joining Oakleigh.

In 1953, while working as a constable with Victoria Police, Chambers fell ill and died soon after at Royal Melbourne Hospital.
