= Roy Chambers =

Australian rugby union player (1892–1955)

- Born: Roy Chambers; 1 August 1892 Dulwich, South Australia
- Died: 4 October 1955 (aged 63)

Rugby union career
- Position: centre
International career
Years	Team	Apps	(Points)
1920	Wallabies	2	(0)

Royden Stanford Chambers (1 August 1892 – 4 October 1955) was a rugby union player who represented Australia.

Chambers, a centre, was born in Sydney and claimed a total of 2 international rugby caps for Australia.
