= Teresa Chambers =

American police officer

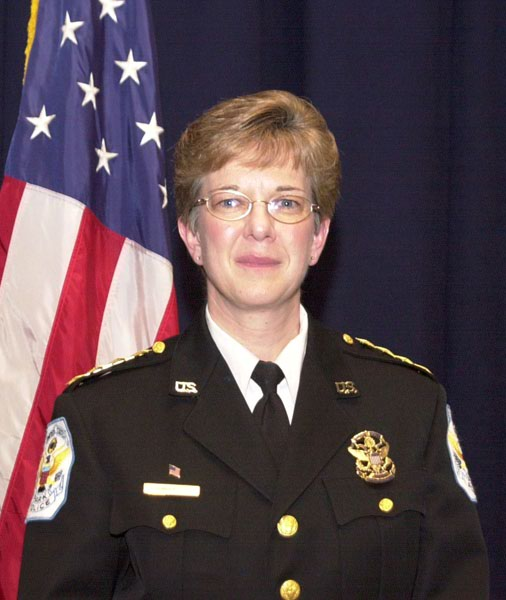
- Education: University of Maryland University College; Johns Hopkins University; FBI National Academy; National Executive Institute
- Police career
- Country: United States of America
- Allegiance: United States Park Police
- Department: United States Park Police
- Status: Chief of Police
- Rank: Chief of Police

Teresa Chambers is an American law enforcement officer and a former chief of the United States Park Police (USPP). She took office as the U.S. Park Police chief on January 31, 2011, but previously served as the U.S. Park Police chief from February 2002 until December 2003, when she was dismissed from the position.

== Early life and education ==
Chambers earned her Bachelor's Degree in law enforcement and criminology from the University of Maryland University College and earned a Master's Degree in applied behavioral science with a concentration in community development from Johns Hopkins University. She is also a graduate of the FBI National Academy and the FBI's National Executive Institute.

== Career ==
Chambers served as the chief of the Durham Police Department in Durham, North Carolina, and served with the Prince George's County Police Department in Prince George's County, Maryland for over twenty years. She also served as the chief of the Riverdale Park Police Department in Maryland.

=== Firing ===
Chambers was fired after speaking with a reporter for The Washington Post in detail about her concerns that new requirements instituted by the United States Congress to double the number of stationary guards at Washington, D.C. monuments, together with budget shortfalls in the Park Police budget were an increasing risk.

The U.S. Park Police administration and the force's union have said they fear that the stationary posts on the Mall have hurt anti-terrorism efforts, because fewer officers are able to patrol in the area. Chambers said that she does not disagree with having four officers outside the monuments but that she would also want to have officers in plainclothes or able to patrol rather than simply standing guard in uniform. Chambers said:

My greatest fear is that harm or death will come to a visitor or employee at one of our parks, or that we're going to miss a key thing at one of our icons.

The incident has been discussed in a larger context as an example of how whistleblowers in U.S. federal agencies are silenced. As Tom Shoop wrote in Govexec.com, a business news site for U.S. federal managers and executives:

...a shoot-the-messenger attitude is beginning to prevail when it comes to [career federal service employees] challenging the conventional wisdom.

==== Appeal and reinstatement ====
During the time in which Chambers awaited her federal employee appeal, she worked as the police chief of Riverdale Park, Maryland. On Tuesday, January 11, 2011 the Merit Systems Protection Board ordered the Park Police to reinstate Chambers within 20 days. The United States Department of Interior, the parent agency for the United States Park Police, was also ordered to pay her retroactively dating back to July 2004. She was granted reimbursement for legal fees. On January 21, 2011, Chambers resumed her position as Chief of the U.S. Park Police after the incumbent chief agreed to step aside. Chief Chambers retired from this post in December 2013.

== Bibliography ==
- CNN: Ex-chief of Park Police denounces firing
- The Washington Post: Park Police Chief Fired After Dispute, Suspension
- Govexec.com "Speak No Evil"
- About.com The Plight of Whistleblowers: Terminated Parks Police Chief tells her own story
- United States Park Police
