= Ken Chambers =

Australian rules footballer (1933–2021)

Personal information
- Full name: Kenneth Edward Chambers
- Born: 7 October 1933
- Died: 19 October 2021 (aged 88)
- Original team: Northcote YCW
- Height: 187 cm (6 ft 2 in)
- Weight: 91 kg (201 lb)

Playing career^{1}
Years	Club	Games (Goals)
1954–55	Fitzroy	4 (1)
- ^{1} Playing statistics correct to the end of 1955.

Kenneth Edward Chambers (7 October 1933 – 19 October 2021) was an Australian rules footballer who played with Fitzroy in the Victorian Football League (VFL).
