= Ari Chambers =

American sports journalist (born 1991)

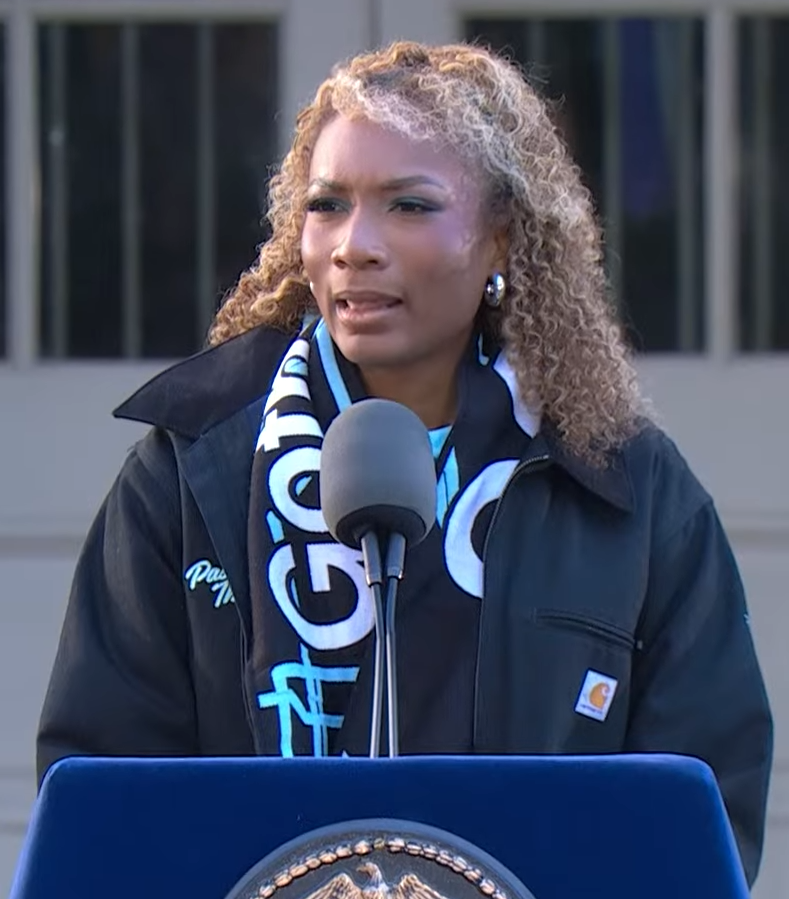
- Chambers in 2025
- Born: Arielle Chambers; March 14, 1991 (age 35)
- Occupations: Sports journalist; commentator

Arielle Chambers (born March 14, 1991) is an American sports journalist and commentator who works for ESPN.

== Early life and education ==
Originally from Raleigh, North Carolina, Chambers is a graduate of the University of Oxford (UK) and North Carolina State University (NC), where she studied New Communication Media and English. After graduating, she worked in in-game entertainment across major sports leagues, including the NBA, NHL, and WNBA. During this time, she noticed the disparity in the visibility of women's sports coverage. She began conducting interviews and sharing them online to her social platforms to address this gap.

== Career ==
Chambers launched HighlightHER for Bleacher Report 2019. As founder of HighlightHER, one of the first media platforms dedicated to women's sports, she delivered a blend of news, highlights, user-generated content, and interviews with athletes such as Tierra Ruffin-Pratt, Venus and Serena Williams, Sylvia Fowles, and more.

She then joined ESPN as a New York City–based host and reporter across its linear and digital platforms including the website Andscape, where she covers women's sports. Notable stories include Olympic coverage for the 2024 Summer Olympics, in which she highlighted stars such as Jordan Chiles, Simone Biles, and Sha'Carri Richardson.

Chambers works to promote gender equality in sports media and address the visibility gap between male sports coverage and female sports coverage through her interviews like “All on the Table,” a series where female athletes have unfiltered conversations about their experience in sports and life. In 2017, she coined the phrase "The WNBA is so important," which became the centerpiece of Twitter Sports' WNBA 25th Anniversary campaign.

Chambers has received numerous accolades for her work in the sports industry including:

- 2024 NC State Alumni Association Outstanding Young Alumni (2024)
- Forbes 30 Under 30 (Sports, 2021)
- Sports Illustrated's 100 Most Influential Women in Sports (2022)
- Dawn Staley Excellence in Broadcasting Award (2022)
- Black Enterprise’s 40 Under 40 (2023)
- The CCNYC Creative Class (2022)
- For(bes) the Culture's 50 Champions (2021)
- The Athletic’s 40 Under 40: Rising Stars in Women's Basketball (2021)
- Foot Locker's Sole List (2021)
- Yahoo’s Changemakers (2021)

In addition to these accolades, Chambers collaborated with Wilson in 2022, to release a special edition basketball, “The Wilson x Ari Chambers” collaboration in homage to her upbringing and ideology.
