= James F. Chambers Jr. =

American newspaper publisher (1913–2006)

James F. Chambers Jr (1913–2006) was a long-time newspaperman who became the Chairman of the Board and Publisher of the Dallas Times Herald.

== Early life ==
Chambers was born May 13, 1913, to James F. and Elizabeth Troutman Chambers. While born in Houston, he was raised in Dallas. After attending public schools, he transferred to the Terrill School for Boys, where he graduated in 1931. As he later recounted, “I went there to prepare for entrance into Boston Tech (the forerunner to MIT). My father wanted me to be an engineer like he was.”

== Early career ==
Chambers’ career path changed dramatically during the summer after his high school graduation. He took a job writing obituaries and short pieces for the daily Dallas Dispatch and decided to accept a full-time job with the newspaper. Instead of going to MIT, he worked full time while taking classes, eventually graduating from Southern Methodist University.

At the time, the Dispatch was one of the four daily newspapers in Dallas. In addition to reporting, Chambers became City Editor at the Dispatch, where he worked for 7 years. In doing so, he often competed for stories with more veteran newspapermen. As he later recounted, “these were the last of the old boys who never let the facts get in the way of a good story.”

In 1934, the 21-year-old Chambers wrote a graphic account of the killing of Bonnie and Clyde. Not only was Chambers supposedly present at the ambush, but he “rode back to Dallas with Barrow’s body in a hearse.”

A year later, in 1935, the city's newspapers were intensely covering the trial of the man who had allegedly kidnapped and killed Charles Lindbergh’s baby. When the verdict to the Trial of the Century was announced, the Dispatch quickly rushed out an “Extra” with a banner headline announcing the guilt of Bruno Richard Hauptmann. At the same time, a rival newspaper, the Dallas Times Herald, had quickly released a headline that Hauptmann was innocent; apparently, there had been a miscommunication between the Associated Press journalist stationed in the courtroom window and his confederate on the ground. The next day's Dispatch featured a six-column photo of the Times Herald mistake, with a bold-faced headline written by the 22-year-old Chambers: “We’d Rather Be Right Than Be The Times Herald.”

Chambers left the newspaper business, briefly, in about 1940. He first worked as public relations director for the Dallas Chamber of Commerce and then worked in a similar role for North American Aviation.

== Dallas Times Herald ==
Chambers was hired by the Dallas Times Herald in 1944 as the executive news editor. In 1952, he became vice president and general manager. He was named president in 1960, publisher in 1967, and chairman of the board in 1970.

In 1951, Chambers won the Associated Press Managing Editors Award for his 1951 story about the St. Paul Hospital fire.

In 1961, Chambers engaged in a war of editorials with the publisher of the rival newspaper, the Dallas Morning News. The feud began at a White House luncheon. The rival publisher, Ted Dealey, told President Kennedy that a “man on horseback” was needed to lead the country, not someone “riding Caroline’s tricycle.” Chambers stood and told the president that Dealey's views didn't reflect the views of everyone in Dallas. The feud continued for two years until the Kennedy assassination, an event that led much of the country to blame Dallas for his death. Chambers was later to write that the Kennedy assassination “killed us as a city.”

In 1975, the year that Chambers retired from his role as publisher, Newsweek ranked The Dallas Times Herald as one of the five best newspapers in the South.

== Personal life ==
Chambers was married for 71 years to Elizabeth (Betty) Moore Chambers. They had two children.
