= Jeremy Chambers =

Australian author (born 1974)

- Born: 1974 (age 51–52)
- Education: University of Melbourne
- Occupation: Author
- Writing career
- Genre: Fiction
- Notable works: The Vintage and the Gleaning, Suburbia
- Notable awards: Griffith Review Emerging Writer's Prize for Fiction (2010)

Jeremy Chambers (born 1974) is an Australian author.

== Background ==
Chambers was born in 1974. He attended the University of Melbourne, where he studied Literature and Philosophy.

== Career ==
Chambers is best known as a fiction writer, publishing novels and short stories.

He is the author of the novels The Vintage and the Gleaning (2010) and Suburbia (2017). The Vintage and the Gleaning was shortlisted for The Australian/Vogel Literary Award and the Colin Roderick Award and longlisted for the International Dublin Literary Award and the Quebec Booksellers’ Award. It was named as one of the Sydney Morning Herald's 'Best books of 2010' by Andrew Riemer and Alex Miller (writer).

The Vintage and the Gleaning was discussed in chief literary critic of The Australian Geordie Williamson's 'Long View' essay for the Wheeler Centre, 'Our Common Ground'

Chambers was the joint winner of the Griffith Review Emerging Writer's Award for fiction in 2010.

== Published works ==
Novels

- The Vintage and the Gleaning (Text Publishing, 2010)
- De oogst en het gisten (Dutch translation of The Vintage and the Gleaning: Uitgeverij Cossee, 2011)
- Le Grand Ordinaire (French translation of The Vintage and the Gleaning: Éditions Grasset, 2013)
- Suburbia (Text Publishing 2017)

Short Stories

- 'The Wedding Speech'
- 'The Honeymoon'
- 'Fishing Trip'
- 'The Lighted Way'
- 'Big Night Out'
