= John Chambers (pastoralist) =

New Zealand pastoralist (1819–1893)

- Born: 20 January 1819; Heanor, Derbyshire, England
- Died: 11 July 1893 (aged 74)
- Occupations: Pastoralist, community leader, businessman
- Known for: Pastoral and civic activities in New Zealand

John Chambers (20 January 1819 – 11 July 1893) was a New Zealand pastoralist, community leader and businessman. He was born in Heanor, Derbyshire, England on 20 January 1819.
