= Meshach Chambers =

English cricketer

Meshach Chambers (23 December 1867 – 23 June 1920) was an English cricketer who played for Nottinghamshire. He was born in Awsworth and died in Newcastle-upon-Tyne.

Chambers made a single first-class appearance for the team, playing in Nottinghamshire's first ever first-class match in 1894. He scored just six runs in the two innings in which he played, and bowled 21 overs, taking one wicket.
