= Donna Chambers =

American jewelry designer (born 1950)

- Born: March 1, 1950 (age 75); Ossining, New York, U.S.
- Education: Pratt Institute
- Occupations: Jewellery designer, Goldsmith
- Years active: 1978–present
- Website: donnachambersdesigns.com

Donna Chambers is an American jewellery designer based in White Plains, New York, United States. She is known for designs featuring pearls and antique mother of pearl gambling chips. Chambers' jewellery has been carried by major department stores such as Bloomingdale's, Saks Fifth Avenue and Na Hoku and the National Museum of African American History and Culture in Washington, D.C.

== Life ==
Chambers worked for textile designer Vera Neumann to separate colours for silk screen scarves. In 1968, Chambers received the first Vera Industries George Neumann Scholarship award and attended Pratt Industries to study fashion design. Chambers also worked as an assistant to fashion designer Oleg Cassini.

== About ==
Chambers married jeweler Irving Williams in 1976. She took over his Brooklyn jewellery repair business upon his death in 1978. Donna Chambers Designs was established in 1981 to create/manufacture 14-karat gold and cultured-pearl fine jewellery. Later, a line of porcelain cameos featuring African-American women was added, as well as a line of antique mother-of-pearl for real Chinese gambling chips further enhanced with pearls. The poker chips, which form the centerpieces of bracelets, earrings and pendants, date from the Ching Dynasty and typically bear family crests or initials on one side and a drawing engraved with some aspect of Chinese life on the other. Chambers came across the poker chips by accident. "I'm known as the pearl lady . ... My work has always been of pearl, whether freshwater or cultured. I use a lot of mother of pearl, abalone, and cultured pearls. I was in Tucson [about 1988] . ... and I did a double take," Chambers said, "I saw these mother-of-pearl, beautifully carved pieces...I picked up a few and made two or three pins with them."

In 1990, Chambers opened That Old Black Magic Book and Gift Gallery at Westchester, a New York gift shop featuring African-American gift items, art, greeting cards, and books. The works of more than 50 artists and designers were featured in the store. A monthly book club sponsored by the shop featured readings by Arthur Ashe, Nikki Giovanni, Bernice L. McFadden, the Rev. Al Sharpton, and Iyanla Vanzant. The shop closed after 20 years.

== Awards ==
- National Women's Jewelry Association Award for Manufacturing Excellence - 1992
