= Emma Chambers (soubrette) =

English mezzo-soprano (1848–1933)

Emma Chambers (1848–1933) was an English mezzo-soprano who was popular in Australia.

== History ==
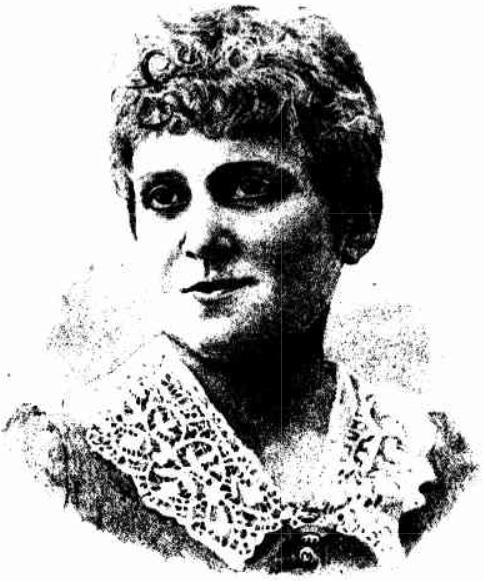
Miss Emma Chambers

She attracted public attention by her portrayal of Harry Halyard in John Thomas Haines' My Poll and My Partner Joe at St James's Theatre, London in May 1871 and as Jack in H. J. Byron's pantomime Jack the Giant Killer at the Alexandra Palace theatre, London, and a young country girl in his comedy Sour Grapes. From 1874 to 1877 she played in various operas (Die Fledermaus, The Princess of Trebizonde) under contract at the Royal Alhambra Theatre, Leicester Square, London. She appeared as Diane de Château-Lansac, head of the convent school in Lecocq's Le Petit Duc at the Philharmonic Theatre, Islington, then was engaged to play Serpolette in Planquette's Les cloches de Corneville at the Globe Theatre, London, by its owner, Alexander Henderson (1828–1886). She played Jacqueline in Lecocq's La petite mademoiselle, with English libretto by Reece and Leigh, at the Alhambra, and Arabella Lane in Solomon and Stephens' comic opera Billee Taylor at the Imperial Theatre, Westminster, in 1880.

=== Australia ===
She arrived in Australia in October 1884 under contract to Williamson, Garner and Musgrove, to reprise her part in Les cloches de Corneville at the Princess's Theatre, Melbourne. She joined Brookes and Thompson's Arabian Nights company which toured America and returned to Australia a year later. She played Dolly Dutton in MacKaye's Hazel Kirke, Lucy in Henry Pettitt's Hands Across the Sea, Dorothy in Pettitt and Grundy's Bells of Haslemere, and Phoebe Sage in Charles Reade's Drink.

=== South Africa ===
On 28 July 1889 she left Australia for South Africa with her own company by the steamer Yarra. Her mother and brother were also on board. William R. Bernard was a member of her troupe.

She visited England in 1891, then in 1892 returned, via South Africa, to Australia to settle some personal business, but while there, played Bob Bloater, the stable-boy in Dion Boucicault's The Flying Scud for George Rignold.

=== Return to England ===
She had a major part in A Life of Pleasure at the Britannia Theatre in 1901.

== Personal ==
Her sister wrote a popular song with the words "Good-bye, darling, I must leave you; one more kiss before we part"

Around 1889 Chambers married Albert Marsh, who was also her manager. She has also been, reportedly, Mrs Lytton.
