= William Chambers (MP) =

16th-century English politician (died 1559)

William Chambers (by 1521–1559), of London, was an English politician.

He was a member (MP) of the parliament of England for St Ives in 1558.
