= William Chambers (footballer) =

English footballer (born 1900)

Personal information
- Full name: William Alfred Chambers
- Date of birth: 16 September 1900
- Place of birth: Rotherham, England
- Position: Defender

Senior career*
Years	Team	Apps	(Gls)
1918–1919	Mexborough Town	?	(?)
1919–1923	Rotherham County	94	(8)
1923–1924	Denaby United	?	(?)
1924–1925	Rotherham County	9	(1)
Total		105	(9)
- * Club domestic league appearances and goals

William Alfred Chambers (born 16 September 1900) was an English footballer who played in the Football League for Rotherham County.
