= Paul Chambers (academic) =

American political scientist (born 1966)

- Born: Paul Wesley Chambers; August 17, 1966 (age 60)
- Citizenship: United States

Academic background
- Education: University of Oklahoma (BA); Ohio University (MA); Northern Illinois University (PhD)
- Thesis: Factions, Parties, Coalition Change, and Cabinet Durability in Thailand: 1979 to 2001 (2003)

Academic work
- Discipline: Political scientist
- Main interests: Politics of Thailand

Paul Wesley Chambers (born August 17, 1966) is an American political scientist. He is known in academia for his research into the role of the Thai military in the politics of Thailand. He became known to a wider audience after being arrested and charged with lèse-majesté by Thai authorities in April 2025.

== Early life and education ==
Paul Wesley Chambers was born on August 17, 1966. He grew up in Norman, Oklahoma, and graduated from Norman High School in 1984. He received Bachelor of Arts degrees in Letters and Spanish from the University of Oklahoma in 1987 and 1988, respectively, Master of Arts degrees in Political Science and International Affairs from Ohio University in 1991 and 1992, respectively, and a PhD degree in Political Science from Northern Illinois University in 2003. His PhD thesis is entitled Factions, Parties, Coalition Change, and Cabinet Durability in Thailand: 1979 to 2001.

== Academic career ==
Chambers first went to Thailand with the U.S. Peace Corps in 1993, where he volunteered as an English teacher at Suwannaphum School in Roi Et. From 1995 until 1998, he worked as an English instructor at Chulalongkorn University in Bangkok, Rajabhat Institute in Ubon Ratchathani, and Vientiane (Laos).

In 2003, Chambers became visiting assistant professor in Political Science at the University of Oklahoma until he became a lecturer in Political Science at Chiang Mai University in Thailand in 2005. From 2006 until 2008 he served as an academic coordinator and instructor at Payap University's Thai and Southeast Asian Studies Certificate Program.

He was a senior research fellow at Heidelberg University from 2008 until 2011 in a project related to civil–military relations in Asia.

He later became a lecturer in the Faculty of Social Sciences at Naresuan University in Phitsanulok, Thailand, and a visiting fellow at the Thailand Studies Programme of the Singapore-based ISEAS–Yusof Ishak Institute.

In Fall 2026 he began teaching at the Department of International and Area Studies, University of Oklahoma where his research focuses on Politics in Asia, Civil-Military Relations, and the International Relations of Asia.

== Lèse-majesté charges and dismissal ==
In April 2025, Chambers was charged with lèse-majesté by Thai authorities. Chambers was served an arrest warrant by Thai police on April 4, 2025, and summoned to the local police station. The criminal complaint was reportedly filed by the Thai army. After turning himself in, he was released on bail on April 9, 2025. He was charged with lèse-majesté for allegedly writing a text on the website of the ISEAS – Yusof Ishak Institute. Chambers denied having written the text, a webinar invitation posted in October 2024. In the meantime, the text was removed from the institute's website.

The case was dropped by prosecutors, but the police did not initially confirm the decision. Despite the revocation of his work visa, he was not allowed to leave the country. After the court had returned his passport, it was seized by Thai immigration officials for a review of the visa revocation.

Following the revocation of his permission to stay in Thailand, Naresuan University's President terminated his work contract effective from April 9, 2025. Chambers appealed his dismissal for lack of due process.

Chambers left Thailand on May 29, 2025, on the advice of the U.S. embassy.

The case sparked a debate about academic freedom, the treatment of foreign academics in Thailand, and the lèse-majesté laws of the country.

== Publications ==
- Chambers, Paul; Croissant, Aurel, eds. (2010). Democracy under Stress: Civil–Military Relations in South and Southeast Asia. Bangkok: Institute of Security and International Studies. ISBN 978-616-551-119-3.
- Swe, Thein; Chambers, Paul (2011). Cashing In Across the Golden Triangle: Thailand's Northern Border Trade with China, Laos, and Myanmar. Chiang Mai: Mekong Press. ISBN 978-616-90053-4-6.
- Chambers, Paul, ed. (2013). Knights of the Realm: Thailand's Military and Police, Then and Now. Bangkok: White Lotus Press. ISBN 978-974-4801-98-2.
- Croissant, Aurel; Kuehn, David; Lorenz, Philip; Chambers, Paul (2013). Democratization and Civilian Control in Asia. London: Palgrave Macmillan. ISBN 978-1-349-33052-2.
- Chambers, Paul; Waitoolkiat, Napisa (2016). "The Resilience of Monarchised Military in Thailand". Journal of Contemporary Asia. 46 (3): 425–444. doi:10.1080/00472336.2016.1161060.
- Chambers, Paul; Waitoolkiat, Napisa, eds. (2017). Khaki Capital: The Political Economy of the Military in Southeast Asia. Copenhagen: NIAS Press. ISBN 978-87-7694-224-3.
- Chambers, Paul; Nuangjamnong, Nidhi, eds. (2023). Beer in East Asia: A Political Economy. Oxford: Routledge. ISBN 978-1-032-25327-5.
- Chambers, Paul (2024). Praetorian Kingdom: A History of Military Ascendancy in Thailand. Singapore: ISEAS Publishing. ISBN 978-981-5104-24-0.
- Chambers, Paul; Nuangjamnong, Nidhi, eds. (2025). Hooch and Hard Liquor in East Asia: A Political Economy. Oxford: Routledge. ISBN 978-1-032-78124-2.
- Chambers, Paul; Pathmanand, Ukrist, eds. (2026). Plundering Security?: The Economic Power of Thailand's Military. Singapore: ISEAS Publishing. ISBN 978-981-5306-56-9.
