= George Chambers (cricketer, born 1884) =

English cricketer (1884–1947)

Personal information
- Full name: George Henry Chambers
- Born: 24 March 1884; Kimberley, Nottinghamshire, England
- Died: 13 September 1947 (aged 63); Bentley, Yorkshire, England
- Batting: Right-handed
- Bowling: Slow left-arm orthodox

Domestic team information
- Years: Team
- 1903–1905: Nottinghamshire

Career statistics
Competition	First-class
Matches	4
Runs scored	58
Batting average	11.60
100s/50s	–/–
Top score	30
Balls bowled	102
Wickets	–
Bowling average	–
5 wickets in innings	–
10 wickets in match	–
Best bowling	–
Catches/stumpings	1/–
- Source: Cricinfo, 3 October 2010

George Henry Chambers (24 March 1884 – 13 September 1947) was an English cricketer. He was a right-handed batsman who bowled slow left-arm orthodox. He was born at Kimberley, Nottinghamshire.

Chambers made his first-class debut for Nottinghamshire against Middlesex in the 1903 County Championship. The following season he played a single first-class match for the county against the Marylebone Cricket Club at Lord's. The 1905 season was to be his last in first-class cricket, with him representing Nottinghamshire in 2 further first-class matches against Oxford University and Yorkshire. In his 4 first-class matches, he scored 58 runs at a batting average of 11.60, with a high score of 30.
