= Kimberley Chambers (author) =

British novelist

- Born: 13 June 1967 (age 59); Dagenham, East London, England
- Occupation: Author
- Writing career
- Period: 2000s–present
- Website: www.kimberleychambers.com

Kimberley Chambers is an English novelist (born on 13 June 1967) who lives in Hornchurch, Greater London. She has published sixteen crime novels, including the Mitchells & O'Haras and Butlers series, which are mainly set in Essex or East London. She writes gritty, crime family sagas, laced with her trademark humour, most often from the perspective of the villain. Three of her novels – Payback, Tainted Love and Life of Crime - have been Sunday Times Number One bestsellers.

== Life ==
Chambers was born and brought up in Dagenham, Greater London. Her mother, Valerie, worked as a typist, and her father, Tom, was a steel erector. An only child, she attended John Perry Infants and Junior School and Dagenham Priory Comprehensive, but left without any O-Levels. She worked as a market trader on a ladies’ fashion stall in the legendary Roman Road market in the East End. She also worked as a pub DJ and as a mini-cab driver in Romford before writing her first novel, Billie Jo, at the age of 38. As of 2022 she now lives in Hornchurch. Kimberley is a lifelong Tottenham Hotspur supporter.

== Career ==
Chambers' first novel, Billie Jo, was published by Random House’s Preface imprint in 2008. Chambers published another five books with Preface before moving to HarperCollins with her novel in 2012. Chambers still writes all her books by hand.

Her ninth novel, Payback, was awarded a Specsavers Silver Bestseller Award in 2018 for sales in excess of 250,000 copies.

== Books ==
- Billie Jo (2008)
- Born Evil (2009)
- The Betrayer (2009)
- The Feud (2010)
- The Traitor (2010)
- The Victim (2011)
- The Schemer (2012)
- The Trap (2013)
- Payback (2014)
- The Wronged (2015)
- Tainted Love (2016)
- Backstabber (2017)
- Life of Crime (2018)
- The Sting (2019)
- Queenie (2020)
- The Family Man (2021)
- The Brothers (2024)
- Essex Wives (2026)
