= George Chambers (New York politician) =

American politician (1815–1880)

George Chambers (October 31, 1815 Marbletown, Ulster County, New York – September 22, 1880) was an American medical doctor and politician from New York.

== Life ==
He was the son of Assemblyman Jacob Chambers (1776–1847) and Maria (Hasbrouck) Chambers (1780–1835). His father had served in the New York State Assembly from 1835 to 1836. His sister, Catherine Chambers (1807-1865) married their third cousin, once removed Josaphat DuBois Hasbrouck Jr. (1805-1893).

He studied medicine, and began to practice about 1838 in Neversink, Sullivan County, New York. Three years later he returned to Marbletown, and lived in Stone Ridge.

He entered politics as a Whig; joined the Know Nothings, supporting Millard Fillmore for President in 1856; and then became a Democrat. He was Supervisor of the Town of Marbletown in 1848, 1854, and from 1861 to 1866; and Chairman of the Board of Supervisors of Ulster County from 1864 to 1866. He was a member of the New York State Senate (10th D.) in 1866 and 1867.

He was buried at the Benton-Bar Cemetery in Kyserike.

== Family ==
Through his mother, Chambers is a descendant of the Hasbrouck family, Huguenot refugees who helped found New Paltz, New York. Through his father, Chambers is a descendant of Captain Henry Pawling, a British Army officer who helped capture New Amsterdam for the British in 1664, before the American Revolutionary War. He is also a first cousin, once removed of American Naval Officer and Naval Aviation Pioneer Washington Irving Chambers.

On December 5, 1845, Chambers married Sarah Catherine Sahler (1823–1856), and they had four children. On January 28, 1858, he married Mary Esther Westbrook (1835–1895), and they had five children.

Known children of Chambers:

1. Josephine Chambers (1849-1933), by first wife
2. Jacob Chambers (1852-1904), by first wife
3. Frank Chambers (1859-1901), by second wife
4. George F. Chambers (1861-1910), by second wife
5. Mattie Chambers (1863-?), by second wife
6. Cora Chambers (1868-?), by second wife
7. Julian M. Chambers (1872-1945), by second wife

His daughter, Josephine, married Hiram Schoonmaker (1836-1910). He was the grandson of Wells Lake, who was a New Paltz Town Supervisor, New York State Assemblyman and New York State Senator, and brother of Wells Lake Schoonmaker, a Marbletown Town Supervisor.

== Sources ==
- The New York Civil List compiled by Franklin Benjamin Hough, Stephen C. Hutchins and Edgar Albert Werner (1870; pg. 444)
- Life Sketches of the State Officers, Senators, and Members of the Assembly of the State of New York, in 1867 by S. R. Harlow & H. H. Boone (pg. 80f)
- Proceedings of the Board of Supervisors of Ulster County for the Year 1863 (pg. 29)
- Chambers genealogy at Family Tree Maker

New York State Senate
Preceded by George Beach	New York State Senate; 10th District; 1866–1867	Succeeded by William M. Graham
