= Charles Edward Chambers =

American painter (1883–1941)

- Born: August 9, 1883; Ottumwa, Iowa, US
- Died: November 5, 1941 (aged 58); New York City, US
- Education: School of the Art Institute of Chicago and Art Students League of New York
- Known for: Illustrating advertisements for Chesterfield cigarettes and Steinway & Sons
- Spouse(s): Fanny Hamilton Musnell (died 1920); Pauline Trece
- Awards: 2nd Altman Prize at National Academy of Design

Charles Edward Chambers (August 9, 1883 - November 5, 1941) was an American illustrator and classical painter. He is most-known for his Chesterfield cigarettes advertisements and Steinway & Sons portraits that ran during the early 1900s. Chambers also illustrated stories for writers W. Somerset Maugham and Pearl S. Buck, among others. These appeared in various magazines including, Cosmopolitan, Harper's, and Redbook.

== Personal life and education ==
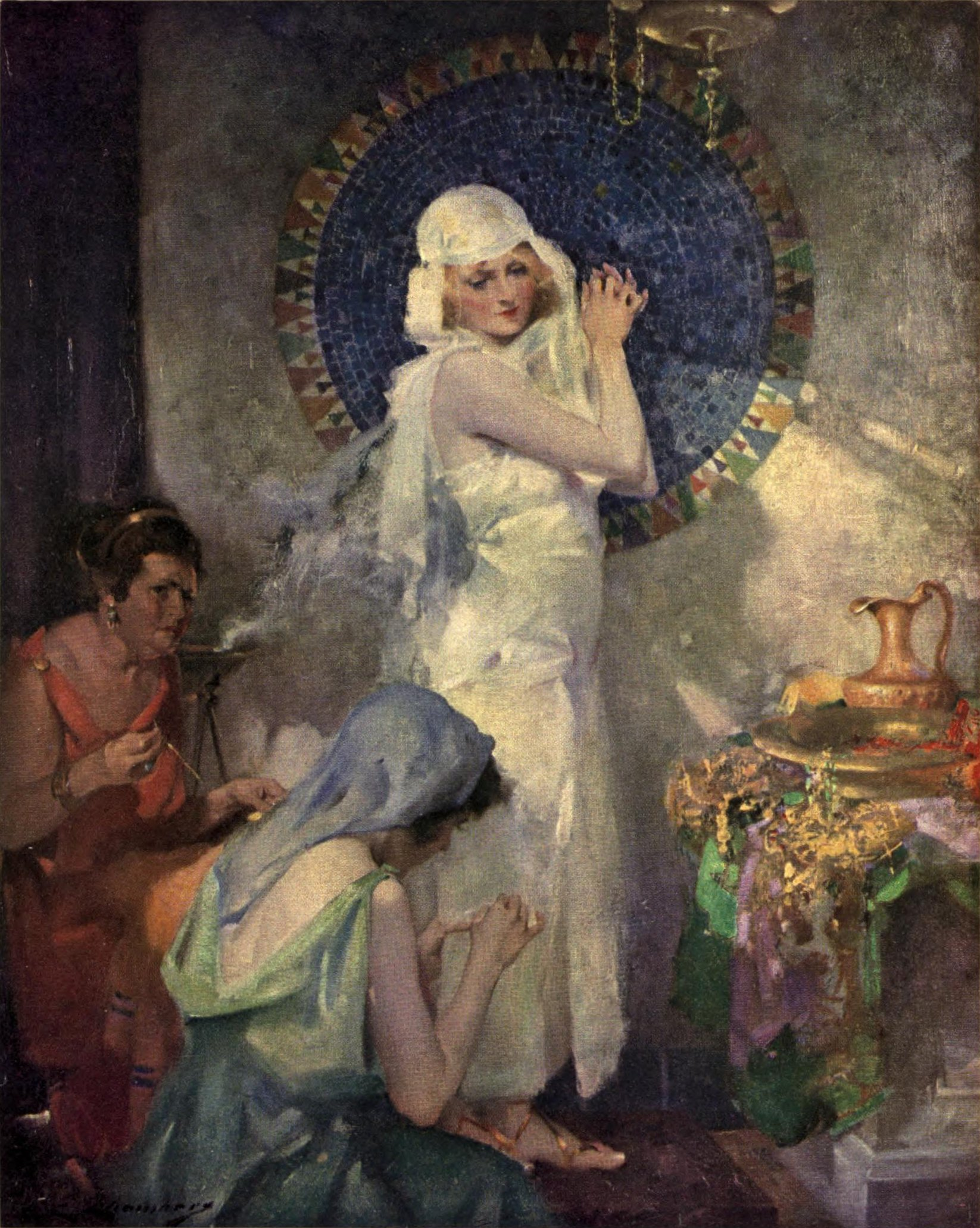
Charles Edward Chambers - The Bride

Chambers was born on August 9, 1883, in Ottumwa, Iowa.

Chambers received his education in art from The School of the Art Institute of Chicago. Later, he attended the National Academy of Design, where he studied under George Bridgman.

One of Chambers' teachers was Fanny Munsell. She was an illustrator for national magazines including, Cosmopolitan and Woman's Home Companion. Her style of illustration influenced Chambers, and the two would eventually marry. They remained together till her death in 1920.

Chambers later remarried to Pauline True, the model from his 1933 Red Cross painting.

On November 4, 1941, Chambers died in New York City.

== Career ==
In the beginning of his career, Chambers illustrated a short story series centered on con man, Get-Rich-Quick Wallingford. Throughout his career, he would continue to illustrate short stories for writers, Pearl Buck, Louis Bromfield, Faith Baldwin, and W. Somerset Maugham. These would appear in the magazines, Harper's, Cosmopolitan, Woman's Home Companion, Ladies' Home Journal, and McCall's.

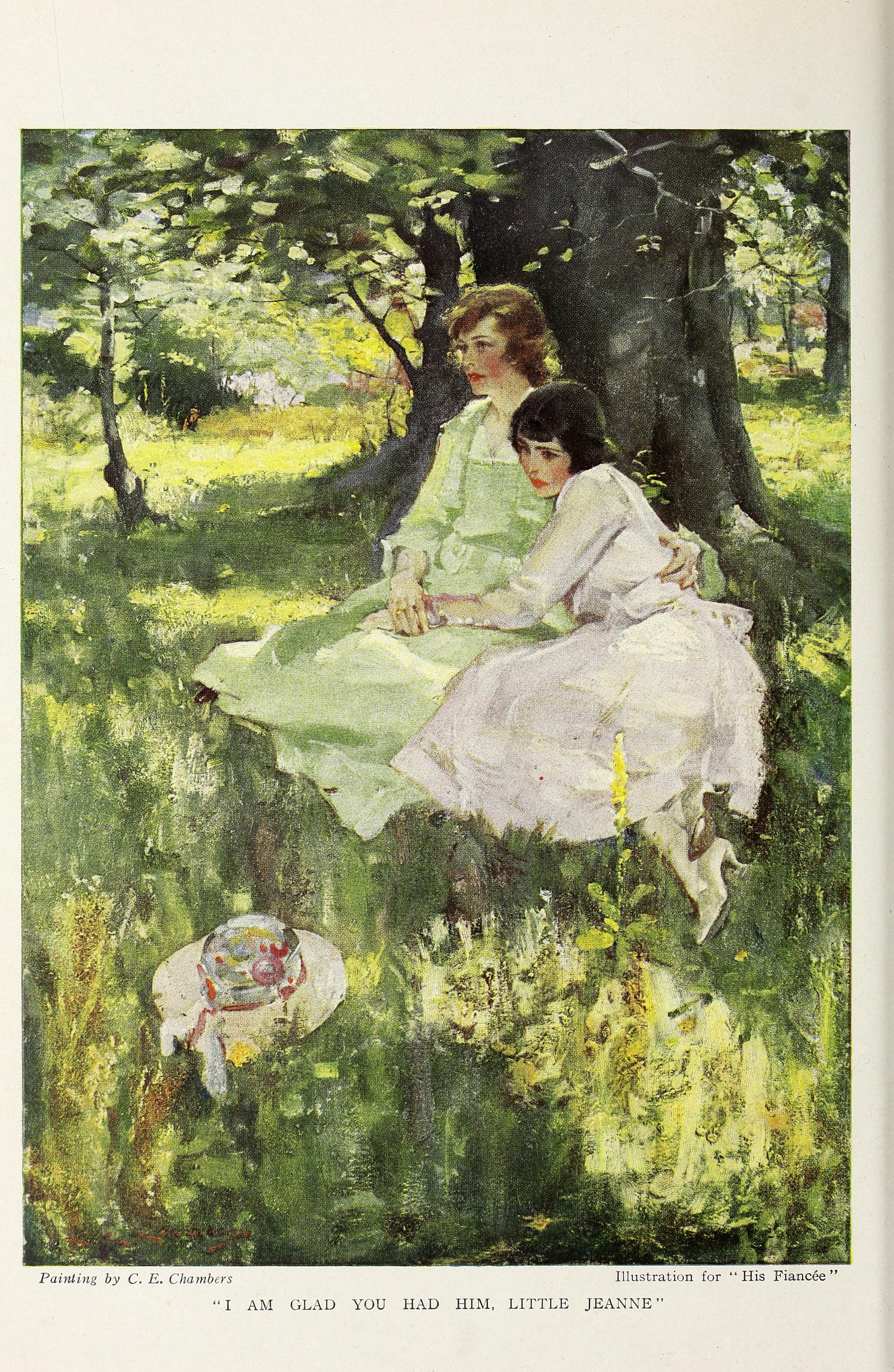
1919 Harper's cover illustrated by Chambers

Chambers' illustrations worked for both advertisements and editorial assignments. He would frequently contribute to Harper's Monthly; many times his illustrations wound up on the cover. His illustrations also appeared on the cover of Redbook magazine. For years, Chambers had an exclusive contract with Cosmopolitan magazine.

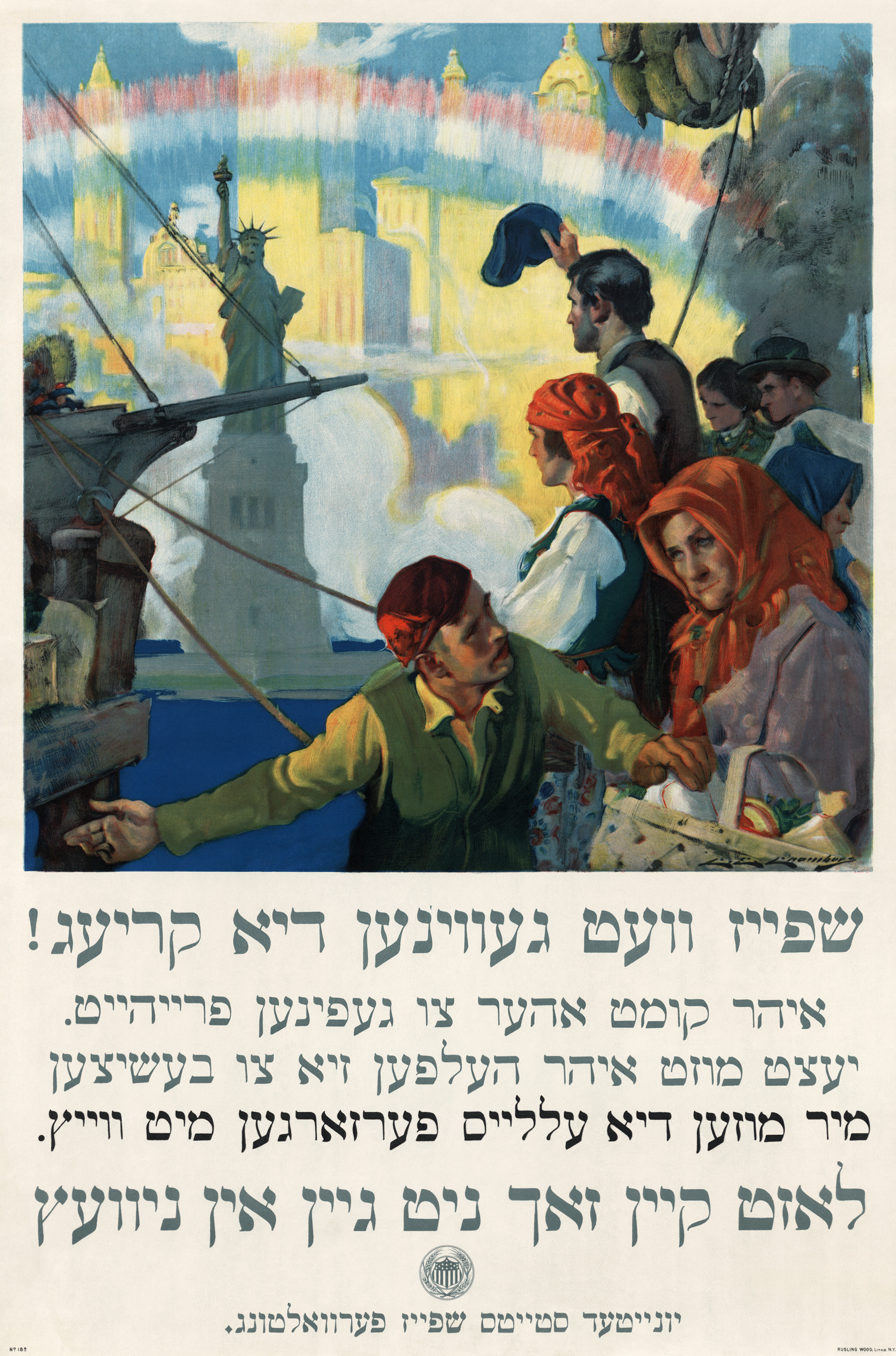
"Food Will Win the War" in Yiddish

In 1917, during World War I, Chambers illustrated a poster for the United States Food Administration, titled "Food Will Win the War." On the poster, it reads: "Food Will Win the War. You came here seeking freedom. You must now help preserve it. Wheat is needed for the allies. Waste nothing." Its target demographic was immigrants. To further drive this point, the poster was produced in many languages: Yiddish, Italian, Spanish, and Hungarian.

In the 1920s, Chambers was commissioned by Steinway & Sons to paint portraits of popular pianists. These portraits of pianists, which included Sergie Rachmaninoff, Josef Hoffman, Alfred Cortot, and Paderewski, were widely reproduced for nine years.

Chambers was also commissioned by Chesterfield cigarettes. His series of billboard advertisements ran for five years. In 1931, these depictions of radiant models smoking, alongside a memorable catchphrase, was considered by Advertising Outdoors as, "the most beautiful posters ever painted." In all, he illustrated 45 billboard displays for Chesterfield cigarettes. Chambers was also responsible for illustrating billboard advertisements for Palmolive soap. His illustrations set high standards for twenty-by-four outdoor posters of the time.

In 1912, Chambers became a member of the Society of Illustrators. He was later President of the Artists Guild and member of the Allied AA.

Chambers' style of painting has been described as, "extremely competent, marked by subtlety of value and color." Other critics have said that because of the "polish" of his paintings, one would think he had studied at the French Academy. The use of color was considered his strength.

In 1931, he was awarded the 2nd Altman Prize at the National Academy of Design exhibition for his portrait of artist John Alonzo Williams. In 2010, Chambers was inducted into the Hall of Fame of the Society of Illustrators.
