= Dave Chambers (footballer) =

English footballer (born 1947)

Personal information
- Full name: David Martin Chambers
- Date of birth: 6 June 1947 (age 79)
- Place of birth: Barnsley, West Riding of Yorkshire, England
- Height: 5 ft 6 in (1.68 m)
- Positions: Midfielder; winger

Youth career
- –1965: Rotherham United

Senior career*
Years	Team	Apps	(Gls)
1965–1968	Rotherham United	27	(4)
1968–1971	Southend United	62	(5)
1971	→ York City (loan)	7	(1)
1971–1972	York City	9	(0)
1972–????	Folkestone		
Total		105	(10)
- * Club domestic league appearances and goals

David Martin Chambers (born 6 June 1947) is an English former professional footballer who played as a midfielder or as a winger in the Football League for Rotherham United, Southend United and York City, and in non-League football for Folkestone.
