= George Chambers (cricketer, born 1866) =

English cricketer (1866–1927)

George Chambers (18 October 1866 – 15 June 1927) was an English cricketer. He was a left-arm fast bowler who played for Nottinghamshire. He was born in Ilkeston and died in New Awsworth.

Chambers' debut came during the 1896 County Championship season, against Sussex. Batting in the tailend, he finished not out in the first innings in which he batted, and with a sturdy 16 runs in his second innings.

Chambers had to wait nearly three seasons until he played first-class cricket again, during the 1899 season - in which his first action was to bowl out Stanley Jackson. He would play just two matches during the season - his final match coming against Derbyshire, who narrowly avoided an innings defeat following the wicket of Joe Humphries.
