= Dorothy Kinney Chambers =

Baptist missionary physician (1901–2001)

Dorothy Joy Kinney Chambers
- Born: Dorothy Joy Kinney; September 16, 1901; Albuquerque, New Mexico
- Died: December 3, 2001 (aged 100); Fort Collins, Colorado
- Education: Denison University (BS); University of Colorado School of Medicine (MD)
- Occupations: Physician and missionary

Dorothy Joy Kinney Chambers (born September 16, 1901, Albuquerque, New Mexico -December 3, 2001 Fort Collins, Colorado) was a missionary physician who treated American military inmates at the Santo Tomas Internment Camp.

== Early life and education ==
Chambers’ parents were Edwin Bruce Kinney, a Baptist minister, and Mabel E. Alger Kinney.

Before Chambers graduated as salutatorian of her class at the University of Colorado School of Medicine (Class of 1926), she earned her BS from Denison University in 1923. She went to northeast India for ten years after graduating to work with the poor.

While there, she met Fred Chambers who was a widowed Baptist minister and they married in 1936. They moved to the Philippines in 1939 as WWII was starting in Europe and Chambers began to work at a mission hospital. When Japan took over the Philippines, Dorothy, Fred and their two young children were sent to internment camps at an Iloilo prison and the campus of University of Santo Tomas in Manila. They were there from April 1942 until February 1945.

They returned to Colorado after the war living in Boulder and Fort Collins. After her husband died, she would tell her story around the country on the lecture circuit. Chambers died at age of 100 on December 3, 2001, in Fort Collins, Colorado.

== Publications about Chambers ==
- Pullen, L. (1999). "Dorothy Kinney Chambers: a most valiant woman". Am Baptist Q. Vol. 18, no. 4. pp. 389–95. PMID 21174919.
- Schwaner, Mary; Hawk, Bobbi Chambers (2018). Courage in a White Coat. CreateSpace. ISBN 978-1719542654.
