= George Frederick Chambers =

English barrister and author (1841–1915)

- Born: 18 October 1841; Upton-upon-Severn, Worcestershire, England
- Died: 24 May 1915 (aged 73); Sydenham, London, England
- Citizenship: United Kingdom
- Occupation: barrister

George Frederick Chambers (18 October 1841 – 24 May 1915) was an English barrister, amateur astronomer and author, who wrote a number of popular books about science.

Chambers was born on 18 October 1841 at Upton-upon-Severn, Worcestershire. He was introduced to astronomy by his uncle, who owned an observatory in Eastbourne, Sussex, where Chambers stayed from time to time as a child. Chambers went on to study engineering as a student in London.

George Chambers published his first book, A Handbook of Descriptive and Practical Astronomy, when he was aged only 19 years. It provided a review of astronomy across 600 pages. It was later republished in an expanded form, and eventually appeared as three volumes.

Chambers turned from engineering to study law. He became a barrister in 1868, and worked for many years as a parliamentary barrister.

Chambers set up home in Eastbourne in 1873, where he and his family lived until 1902. He built a private observatory, which he used to study double stars, variable stars, and star colours. He served as director of the Star-Colour Section of the British Astronomical Association between 1894 and 1900.

Chambers became a prolific author. He produced a revised version of A Cycle of Celestial Objects by Admiral W. H. Smyth. This was followed by Pictorial Astronomy in 1891.

His most popular books were a series of introductions to astronomy, with volumes called The Story of the Solar System, The Story of the Stars, The Story of Eclipses, and The Story of Comets. These served to educate general readers about science.

Chambers also wrote geographical guides and travel books, including a Handbook to Eastbourne. He was the author of many magazine articles and legal works.

George Chambers later moved to Sydenham in south London. He died there on 24 May 1915.

== Works ==
- Stories of the Universe - The Stars (1895)
- The Story of the Solar System (1895)
- The Story of Eclipses (1899)
