= Charles Chambers (cricketer) =

English cricketer (1870–1921)

Personal information
- Full name: Charles Graham Chambers
- Born: 12 July 1870; West Ilsley, Berkshire, England
- Died: 30 January 1921 (aged 50); Reading, Berkshire, England
- Batting: Right-handed
- Bowling: Unknown

Career statistics
Competition	First-class
Matches	1
Runs scored	21
Batting average	10.50
100s/50s	–/–
Top score	16
Balls bowled	15
Wickets	–
Bowling average	–
5 wickets in innings	–
10 wickets in match	–
Best bowling	–
Catches/stumpings	–/–
- Source: Cricinfo, 4 October 2015

Charles Graham Chambers (12 July 1870 – 30 January 1921) was an English cricketer who made one appearance in first-class cricket in 1894. He was a right-handed batsman.

== Early life and education ==
Chambers is the son of a Dorset reverend. He began his education at Marlborough College in January 1882, where he later played for the cricket XI and rugby XV.

He left Marlborough in the mid-summer of 1889, after which he proceeded to study at Lincoln College, Oxford.

== Career ==
After graduating from Oxford with a BA, Chambers lived in the Liverpool area and played his club cricket for Boughton Hall. He was selected to play what would be his only first-class cricket match in 1894 when picked for the Liverpool and District cricket team against Yorkshire at Aigburth.

In a match which Yorkshire won by 10 wickets, Chambers scored 16 runs in Liverpool and District first-innings, before being dismissed bowled by Thomas Foster. In Yorkshire's first-innings he bowled 3 wicketless overs which conceded 13 runs, and in Liverpool and District second-innings he scored 5 runs before Foster had him dismissed caught behind by David Hunter.

Chambers had moved south by 1896, where he was employed as a solicitor at Friar Street in Reading, Berkshire. It was at Reading that he died on 30 January 1921.
