= Elizabeth Chambers (pilot) =

American aviator (1920–1961)

Betty Chambers
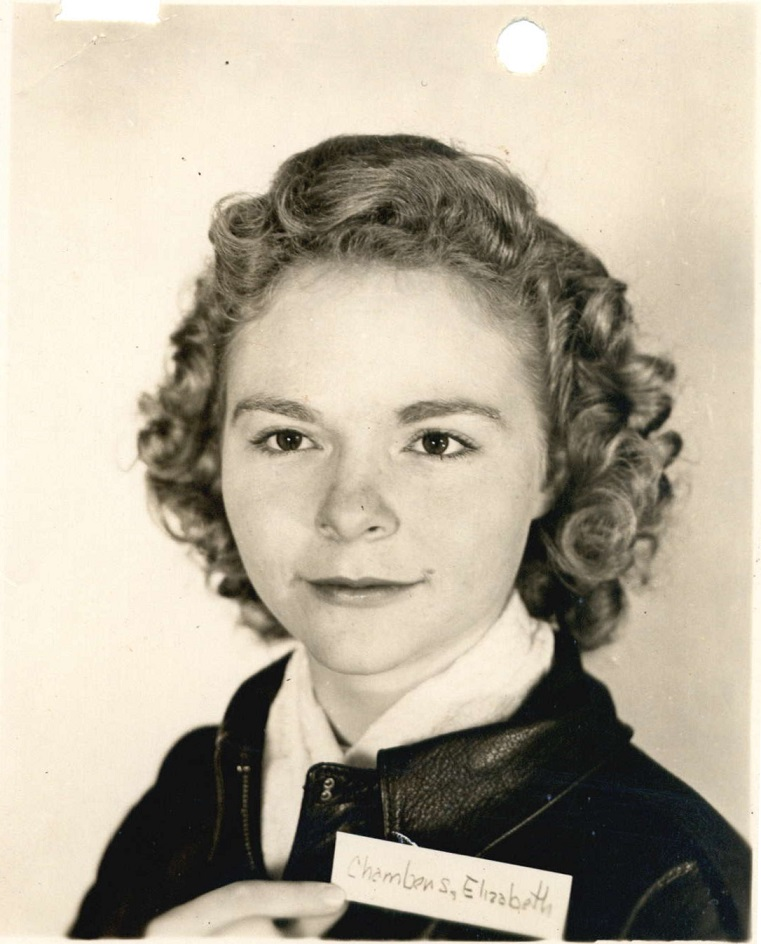
- Born: Elizabeth Maxine Cramsey; August 25, 1920; Los Angeles, California, U.S.
- Died: May 11, 1961 (aged 40); Los Angeles, California U.S.
- Other name: Elizabeth Black
- Occupation: Women Airforce Service Pilots

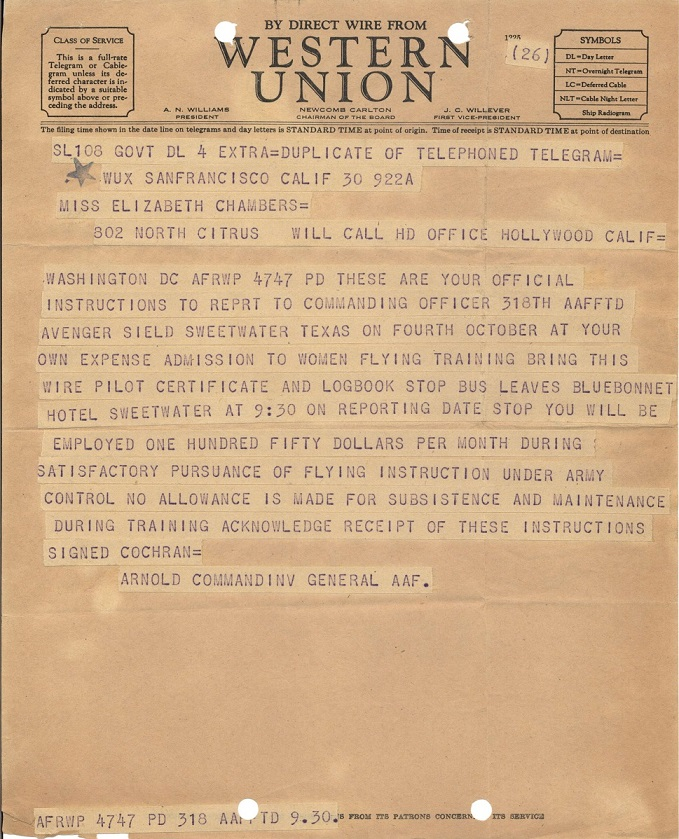
Telegram to Chambers from Jacqueline Cochran instructing her to report for duty

Elizabeth Maxine Chambers (August 25, 1920 − May 11, 1961) was one of the first female pilots in the Women Airforce Service Pilots (WASP) program in which women took on non-combat flying duties so more male pilots were available for combat. She was in WASP Class of 44-W-3 as part of the 318th Army Air Forces Flying Training Detachment. She became a pilot shortly after her husband lost his life while flying, despite the fact that she had a new baby, and was the only recent widow and mother to have served as a WASP.

== Early life ==
Chambers was born in Los Angeles, California, to Samuel Cramsey and Gertrude Cramsey (née Hulse). She grew up in Hollywood, California.

== Career ==
Prior to World War II Chambers worked for the Walt Disney Company and Universal Pictures, where she did post-production work that involved inking outlines for cartoon celluloid cells in preparation for painting during the picture process stage of film production.

Chambers was married to Robert William Chambers, a United States Army pilot who had previously worked at Lockheed in the engineering department. Later, during her service as a WASP, Chambers would be sent on a mission to tour a Lockheed plant.

In 1942 during the war, Robert was killed in an aircraft crash. After his death, Chambers and her baby moved in with her parents and she got a job as a telephone operator at Southern California Telephone Company.

Chambers applied to be a WASP. She said: "Just the day before [my husband's] accident Bob had heard about the WASPs and he wanted me to fly ... in fact, he wanted to teach me, but it didn't work out that way. I love flying as he did, and I hope to be able to replace a man to do the job that Bob wanted to do." She entered training on October 4, 1943, and graduated on April 15, 1944.

Chambers trained at Avenger Field in Sweetwater, Texas, and then was sent to Turner Field in Albany, Georgia. She then attended the Army Air Force Tactical School in Orlando, Florida. Chambers was stationed at Greenwood Army Air Field in Greenwood, Mississippi. At Greenwood, Chambers accrued over 420 hours of flight time up until December 20, 1944.

As a pilot she flew North American AT-6 advanced trainers, PT-17 biplane primary trainers, Beechcraft AT-10 twin-engineer trainers, and the BT-25.

Chambers' service ended when the WASP program was disbanded at the end of 1944.

After the war, Chambers worked at American Airlines at LaGuardia Airport in New York City until 1946. She eventually lost touch with the WASP community, a close-knit group who often held reunions and get-togethers.

== Honors ==
On November 2, 1977, President Jimmy Carter passed Public Law 95-202, which gave those that served in the WASP program military veteran status. They were previously considered civilians. In July 2009, President Barack Obama signed a bill that gave the WASPs the Congressional Gold Medal.

== Personal life ==
In 1941, Chambers married Robert William Chambers, a United States Army pilot. Their son, Robert Michael "Mike" Chambers, who was born in 1942, was in the 1943 movie Heaven Can Wait, playing Don Ameche's character as a baby.

In 1947, she married Robert Edward Black, a lumberman. She died in 1961.

== See also ==
- Jacqueline Cochran
- Women Airforce Service Pilots
- Women Airforce Service Pilots Badge
- Fifinella
