= Bruce Chambers (footballer) =

Australian rules footballer

Personal information
- Full name: Bruce Chambers
- Born: 23 September 1959 (age 67)
- Original team: Koroit
- Height: 180 cm (5 ft 11 in)
- Weight: 82 kg (181 lb)

Playing career^{1}
Years	Club	Games (Goals)
1980	Fitzroy	1 (0)
- ^{1} Playing statistics correct to the end of 1980.

Bruce Chambers (born 23 September 1959) is a former Australian rules footballer who played 1 game for Fitzroy in the Victorian Football League (VFL) in 1980.
