= William Frederick Chambers =

British physician

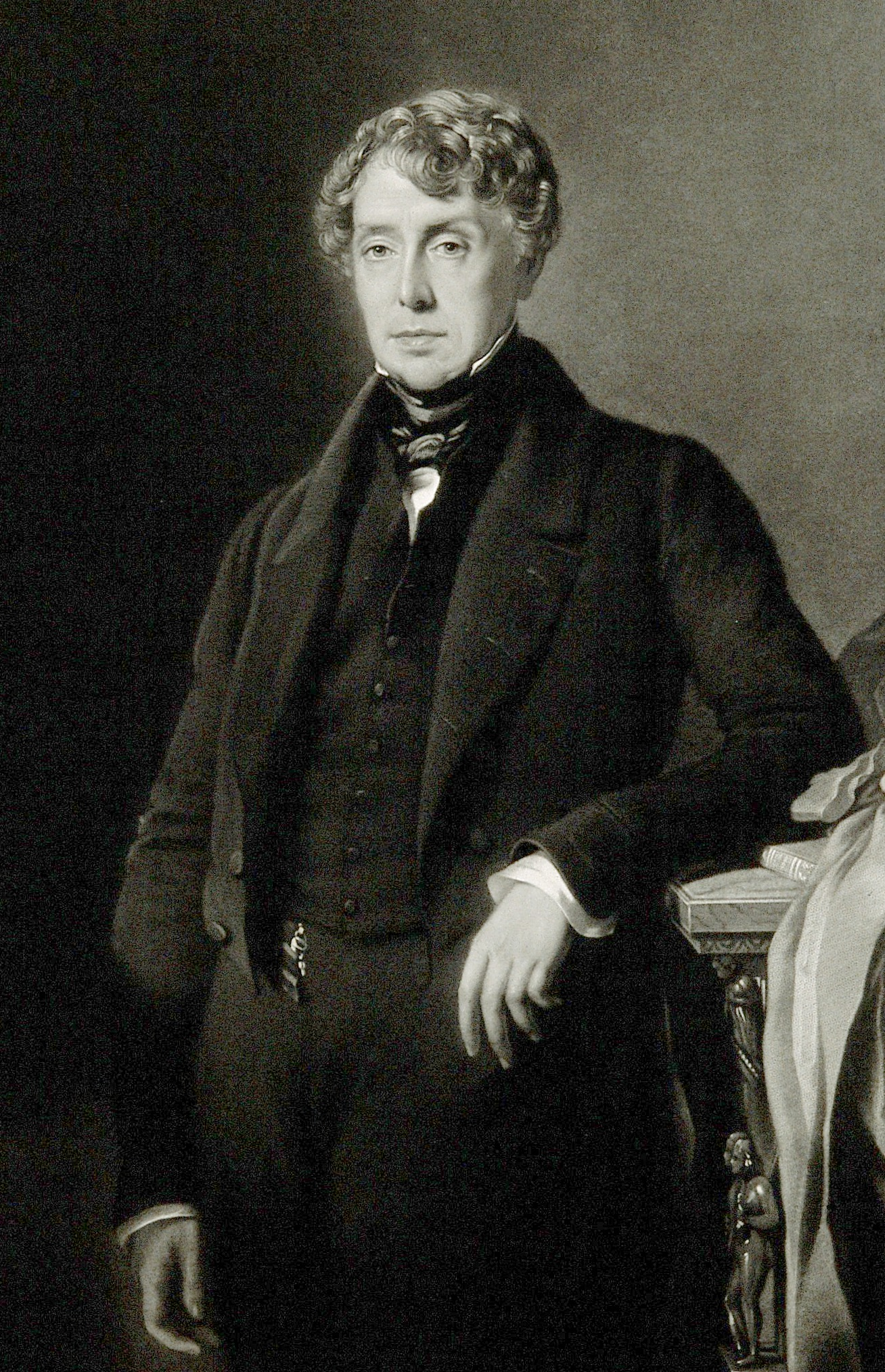
William Frederick Chambers

William Frederick Chambers, KCH (1786–1855) was a British physician. He became physician in ordinary to Queen Adelaide of Saxe-Meiningen and King William IV of England.

Chambers was the eldest son of William Chambers, a political servant of the East India Company, and a distinguished oriental scholar, who died in 1793, by his marriage with Charity, daughter of Thomas Fraser, of Balmain, Inverness-shire. Sir Robert Chambers (1737–1803) was his uncle.

He was born in India in 1786, came to England in 1793, was educated at Bath grammar school and at Westminster School; from which he was elected to a scholarship at Trinity College, Cambridge, where he graduated BA (1808), MA (1811) and MD (1818). On leaving Cambridge he studied medicine at St George's Hospital, the Windmill Street School of Medicine, and in Edinburgh. He was an inceptor candidate of the Royal College of Physicians, London, 22 December 1813, a candidate 30 September 1818, a fellow 30 September 1819, censor (police of the Royal College of Physicians) 1822 and 1836, consiliarius 1836, 1841, and 1845, and an elect in 1847.

On 20 April 1816 he was elected physician at St. George's Hospital, though the youngest of the candidates, and held the post until 1839; during that period he delivered a course of lectures on practical medicine, a report of which was printed in the Medical Gazette. For some time his private practice did not increase, and in 1820 his receipts were only about £200; however, after that year a change took place, until at last he attained that standing in the profession in which a physician monopolises the greater part of the consulting practice among the upper classes.

He was gazetted physician in ordinary to Queen Adelaide 25 October 1836, and physician in ordinary to William IV on 4 May 1837. Ernest, the new king of Hanover, on 8 August 1837 created him KCH; but at his urgent request allowed him to decline the assumption of the ordinary prefix of knighthood. In the succeeding reign he became physician in ordinary to Queen Victoria on 8 August 1837, and to the Duchess of Kent in 1839.

He was President of the Royal Medical and Chirurgical Society in 1845.

He continued to be the leading physician in London, with an income of from seven to nine thousand guineas a year, until 1848, when bad health obliged him to retire into private life. Shortly after he had given up the practice of his profession a notice of his death appeared in a medical journal, and was contradicted by himself. In 1834 a poisoned wound, obtained in a post-mortem examination, had nearly cost him his life, and from its effects he never fully recovered. On his retirement he took up his residence on his estate at Hordlecliffe, near Lymington, Hampshire, where he died of paralysis on 16 December 1855.

His success in practice depended mainly on the clear insight which he gained into all the bearings of a case by habituating himself to place all the facts before him in the order of their importance, with reference to present symptoms and immediate treatment required. His constant habit of taking notes of cases coming before him gave his mind a compactness and clearness in summing up facts which was the parent of practical views in theory and successful decision in action.

On 13 March 1828 he was elected a fellow of the Royal Society. His only contribution to literature was a series of papers on cholera, printed in The Lancet on 10 and 17 February and 3 March 1849.

He married, 10 February 1821, Mary, daughter of William Mackinen Fraser, MD, of Lower Grosvenor Street, London. His manuscripts of cases in St. George's Hospital, 1814–28, in ten volumes folio, were in the library of the Royal Medical and Chirurgical Society. His note-taking of cases was considered to be particularly thorough.
