= Richard Gwent =

Welsh archdeacon (died 1543)

Dr Richard Gwent (died 1543) was a senior ecclesiastical jurist, pluralist cleric and administrator through the period of the Dissolution of the Monasteries under Henry VIII. Of south Welsh origins, as a Doctor of both laws in the University of Oxford he rose swiftly to become Dean of the Arches and Archdeacon of London and of Brecon, and later of Huntingdon. He became an important figure in the operations of Thomas Cromwell, was a witness to Thomas Cranmer's private protestation on becoming Archbishop of Canterbury, and was Cranmer's Commissary and legal draftsman. He was an advocate on behalf of Katherine of Aragon in the proceedings against her, and helped to deliver the decree of annulment against Anne of Cleves.

A royal chaplain, he helped to arrange a peace treaty with Scotland, and steered the revision of the Canon Law and other textual reforms. An instrument of policy rather than a prime mover, he helped to implement major reforms including the King's Supremacy, took the surrender of some larger monasteries in the western English borders, and was Prolocutor of the lower house in three important Ecclesiastical Convocations of the period. He was also involved in the identification and interrogation of heretics. His long association with Cranmer brought him closely into the process of Reform, but in his duty of service to various masters his personal religious sympathies are not fully apparent.

== Life ==
=== Origins and education ===
Richard Gwent and his brothers Thomas Gwent and John Gwent were the sons of a Monmouthshire farmer. Elected Fellow of All Souls College, Oxford in 1515, he supplicated for Bachelor of Civil Law on 17 December 1518 and for Bachelor of Canon Law on 22 January following, and was admitted for the latter on 28 February (1518/19). He supplicated for Doctor of Canon Law on 20 March 1522/23, was licensed for Doctor of Civil Law on 1 August 1524 and admitted to the latter on 3 April 1525. He had previously been presented by the abbess and convent of Godstow to the vicarage of St Giles in Oxford, but resigned that benefice in April 1524.

=== Advocate in London ===
For a while Gwent acted as chief moderator of the canon law school at Oxford University. He was admitted to Doctors' Commons on 20 April 1526, moving to London to practise as an ecclesiastical advocate. Presented to the Canterbury living of Tangmere, Sussex in April 1528, he is thought to have entered the service of Cardinal Wolsey, thereby becoming known to Thomas Cromwell. In 1529 he acted as a junior advocate on behalf of Catherine of Aragon, in the hearings before Wolsey and Lorenzo Campeggio: during that time Gwent's advice was considered important enough, on a certain occasion, that he was fetched from Gloucester and Llanthony to consult with the Queen at Woodstock over letters brought from Rome. Gwent, however, avoided the royal displeasure incurred by John Fisher, who led the Queen's defence, and in March 1530 received the Westminster Abbey presentation to St Leonard, Foster Lane, London.

=== Dean of the Arches ===
Gwent may have been transferred from Wolsey's household to the service of the King when that prelate fell: by 1532 he had become a chaplain to the King. He was admitted to the prebend of Pipa Parva in the church of Lichfield in October 1531, but exchanged it for that of Longdon (a Lichfield peculiar) in the following December. During 1532 his name arises in Cromwell's correspondence, and he became prominent among the royal advisors.

This decisive turn in Gwent's career came with the death of Archbishop William Warham of Canterbury, who had held the see since 1504. The vacancy required a principal official who could be depended upon while the successor was chosen, and (although the office was usually in the Archbishop's gift) Cromwell seized the opportunity to appoint Dr Gwent as Dean of the Arches and Master of the Prerogative in the Consistory court of the Province of Canterbury in September 1532. Among his first duties as Doctor of the Decretals was to hear the oaths of the Duke of Norfolk, Sir Andrew Windsor, John Cockes (archbishop's Chancellor) and others, executors in the probate of Archbishop Warham.

Cranmer's protestation

Gwent was therefore in office when Thomas Cranmer was selected to succeed as Archbishop in October 1532 and consecrated in March 1533. Cranmer, having received papal preconization, at his consecration was to make his formal statement of obedience to the pope at Westminster. Before doing so, and foreseeing what services would be expected from him, with the king's approval he summoned John Tregonwell, Thomas Bedyll, John Cockes and Richard Gwent to St Stephen's Chapel at Westminster to witness his private protestation that he would not bind himself to anything contrary to the law of God, or prejudicial to the king's rights, or to anything which might prevent necessary reforms in the Church of England. The King's prothonotary Richard Watkins drew up a legal instrument to this effect which they attested, but which was not recited publicly at the consecration.

In a certain case of the 1530s the Wardens of the Bridge Works in the City of London complained in Chancery that Gwent, as advocate, had formerly acted on behalf of Stratford Langthorne Abbey to demand tithes for a mill in West Ham which were traditionally payable to the Wardens. Their complaint was that as a judge, now Dean of the Arches, he proposed to affirm a judgement for the abbot in the same matter: they sought not only relief from the abbot's claim but also a writ of prohibition against Gwent proceeding in it.

Gwent witnessed Cranmer's questioning, in friendly guise, of the visionary Elizabeth Barton, the nun of Kent, and wrote to Cromwell that they would deliver her to him when enough damning evidence had been gathered. In December 1533 he was commissioned to conduct the Visitation of St Gregory's Priory, St Sepulchre's Priory and St James's Hospital, Canterbury, Faversham Abbey and Wingham College (Kent), and also of the rural deaneries of Canterbury, Westbere and Sandwich. Soon afterwards he was in Lichfield to oversee the consecration of Rowland Lee as bishop according to the true precedents.

In relation to his Lichfield prebend he was instituted to Bebington (Cheshire) in 1531 (holding until 1543, perhaps leased to David Pole); he occupied the vicariate of Bakewell (Derbyshire) from 1533 until 1537; and was presented to North Wingfield (Derbyshire) in 1534 and to Walton-on-the-Hill (Lancashire) at the end of 1535 (both held until 1543). He may also occur as vicar of Leek (Staffordshire) between 1533 and 1541. He held the rectory of St Peter and St Paul, Newchurch, Kent, from 1533 until 1543.

=== Supremacy and the Canon law ===
At the end of March 1534 the Convocation of Canterbury voted to abjure the supremacy of the Bishop of Rome. In readiness for this action, and in anticipation of the Act of Supremacy, a commission of 32 senior persons, 16 from the upper and lower houses of parliament and 16 clergy, was enacted to ensure that none of the canons, constitutions and ordinances of the English Church were prejudicial to the prerogative royal or repugnant to the laws of the realm, and to abolish or to reform the existing canon law as necessary, subject to the legislative authority of the King. A working committee of clerical lawyers was set to work. Gwent's name appears in a list among Cromwell's remembrances which may relate to this: after the middle of July he became its chairman, and continued to conduct its affairs through 1535.

During the spring of 1534 Gwent was involved directly with Lord Chancellor Thomas Audley, Thomas Cromwell, Edward Foxe and John Tregonwell, concluding a peace treaty with the commissioners of James V of Scotland. In April 1534 he exchanged his London rectorate of St Leonard, Foster Lane for that of St Peter, Westcheap, vacant by the elevation of Thomas Goodrich to the bishopric of Ely. (The parish was close to St Mary-le-Bow, in or above the crypt of which the Arches Court was held.) In May he added the prebend of Leighton Ecclesia in the Diocese of Lincoln to his portfolio. In August 1534 he commenced a visitation of the Cathedral church of Lincoln, but upon receiving their protestation, prorogued this until December. In September he visited Merton College, Oxford and changed many of the ancient customs of that house.

=== Archdeacon of London and Brecon ===
The Act of Supremacy being passed in November 1534, Gwent was appointed Archdeacon of London on 19 December, and simultaneously became Archdeacon of Brecon (Diocese of St Davids) in the place of Richard Fetherston, who was arrested and imprisoned for refusing to accept the terms of the Act. In relation to Brecon he held the prebends of Llanfaes, Lloghas and Llanddew, with their annexed chapels, and was prebendary of Aberarth under the collegiate church of Llandewi Brefi, and of Cayre (Caerau) in the church of Llandaff. Plans to enforce the oath upon the monastic orders were developed while, in May 1535, Cranmer conducted his Metropolitan visitation. In a long consultation with Dr Richard Layton, Gwent expressed the opinion "that it was not fit to make any Visitation in the King's name yet, for two or three years, till his Supremacy were better received; and that he apprehended that a severe Visitation so early would make the clergy more averse to the King's power." Layton, however, advocated the opposite view to Cromwell. The great visitation in the King's name commenced in October.

Cromwell deposed that Gwent's licence to hear and conclude cases in the Archbishop's court, including matters of probate and matrimony, should subsist under the King's authority. Receiving Cranmer's mandate, Gwent introduced this formula (with the royal clause) for a definitive Sentence upon probate:

...per nos Ricardum Gwent Archi'm London ad infrascripta auctoritate Illustrissimi et Invictissimi in xpo principis et d'ni n'ri D'ni Henrici octavi dei gra' Anglie et ffrancie Regis fidei defensoris D'ni Hibern' et in terris supremi ecclie Anglicane sub xpo capitis, ...
(...by us Richard Gwent, Archdeacon of London, under the below-written authority of the most Illustrious and Victorious-in-Christ, our prince and lord the Lord Henry the eighth, by the grace of god King of England and France, defender of the faith, Lord of Ireland, and on earth the supreme head of the English church under Christ, ...)

His name appears in various judgments of marital affairs: he decreed the divorce of Sir Thomas Pope from Elizabeth Gunston in 1536.

=== Convocation of 1536 ===
Although Gwent was not directly active in the closure of the smaller monasteries, in his tour of the Chichester diocese in 1535 he had written to Cromwell deploring the houses where there were only three or four inmates, often unable to read Latin, and urged that they should be brought together in larger groups where they could be properly instructed and go about their duties. Three weeks after the execution of Anne Boleyn and the King's marriage to Jane Seymour, in the Convocation of 1536 (over which Cromwell, the lay Vicegerent, presided through Dr Petre as his proctor), Dr Latimer delivered two sermons severely critical of the false stewardship of the Roman church. Dr Gwent, much against his will, had been elected Prolocutor of the lower house of the convention. It therefore fell to him, on 23 June, to submit the contrary view of the clergy, listing 67 "false dogmas" (mala dogmata) or popular blasphemies or heresies against the validity of the sacrament, the holy water, the setting of candles before statues of the saints, and the like, showing that canon reforms were needed to defeat the popular contempt.

From this time, though not employed in suppression, Gwent was mediating appeals from the monasteries and payments or gifts to Cromwell (notably from Godstow Abbey, Battle Abbey, the prior of Ely, Evesham Abbey, and St Augustine's Abbey, Bristol) as the movements against them became apparent. In May 1537, with Thomas Bedyll, Archdeacon of Cornwall, he renewed the pressure upon the monks of the London Charterhouse to accept the Supremacy, with the result that some acceded and the remainder were consigned to the Newgate with fatal consequences. Meanwhile, he was drawn into disputes in the St Davids diocese surrounding the bishop, William Barlow (a strongly reformist representative of Cromwell's policy) and his Chapter, who were of more conservative views. Gwent found himself mediating between them, and conveying gifts and appeals to Cromwell on behalf of the canons at critical moments in their disputes. As at Convocation, these circumstances placed him in an unfavourable position towards the Secretary.

=== Heretics ===
In May 1538, when friar John Forrest (formerly confessor to Catherine of Aragon), having denied the King's supremacy, refused to perform his penance at Paul's Cross, Gwent entreated him to do so, and "opened unto him the indignation of God and dampnation of his bodie and soule perpetuallie, and also have a temporall death by brenning as all heretickes should have by the lawes of this realme." It was to no avail. In the difficult case of William Cowbridge of Colchester, whose grievances and unorthodox teachings led to his imprisonment and were taken for a sign of madness, Gwent, in agreement with his colleagues, affirmed to John Longland that it would be lawful for the man to bear a faggot (as a sign of heresy) as a penance: this, however the man refused, and he was burned as a heretic at Oxford in 1538. In October Gwent was associated in Cromwell's commission to search for Anabaptists, with a view to eliminating the sect.

In May 1539, the king signifying to parliament his demand for religious uniformity, the Duke of Norfolk presented a form of the Six Articles (an affirmation of traditional teachings) to the Lords, which (after debate and revision) Cromwell proposed to the lower house of Convocation on 2 June. Gwent, with the rest, voted acceptance of the decision of the king and bishops, and parliament passed the Articles into law in the same month. In accordance with its terms, the heresies of the Anabaptists and Sacramentarians were pursued by Cranmer in Calais in 1539, and Gwent was present at the inquisition of Ralph Hare, where he reproved Thomas Broke for his theological interventions on Hare's behalf. So they were constrained to do, but the intentions of Cromwell and Cranmer towards deeper tolerance for reform intensified the political hostility of Bishop Gardiner and the Duke of Norfolk towards them.

=== Commissioners of the West ===
Following the Suppression of Religious Houses Act 1539, Dr Gwent was attached to the commission to receive surrender of the larger monasteries in the western border counties, together with Robert Southwell, John London, John ap Rhys, Edward Carne and others. He first received the surrender of Godstow Abbey from his former patron, abbess Kateryn Bulkeley, to whom he assigned a pension, but who felt herself ill-used by Dr London. On 4 January 1540 the commissioners reported to Cromwell that they had "dispacchyd" Hailes Abbey (24 December) and Winchcombe Abbey (29 December), and were now at Gloucester Abbey, where Abbot William Malverne refused to make the surrender and was accordingly omitted from the list of pensions. From Tewkesbury Abbey they proceeded into Worcestershire, where pensions were assigned at Great Malvern Priory (12 January), Worcester Abbey (18 January), Pershore Abbey (21 January), Cookhill Priory (26 January) and Evesham Abbey (27 January). At some time Gwent held the rectory of Cleeve, which acquired peculiar status under the Bishop of Worcester.

=== Convocation of 1540 ===
The king's disappointment in his marriage in January 1540 to Anne of Cleves fatally exposed Cromwell, its architect, to the intrigues of his enemies, and the speedy resolution of an annulment was sought. When the Convocation was reassembled in April 1540, after two sessions Dr Gwent was presented as Prolocutor by Polydore Vergil. On 6 May Cromwell came before them, and a subsidy was granted by the bishops: on 12 May Cromwell was in session, and Gwent addressed him on the payment of the subsidy, which was at the rate of 20 per cent over and above the usual tithes. He, together with Thomas Thirlby, John Incent, Anthony Draycot, David Pole and Thomas Brerewode, was appointed from the lower house to transact and conclude with the Lords.

The great question of the annulment was then brought forward. On 10 June Cromwell was arrested. In the last week of June there was much discussion of the Queen's case, in which Dr Gwent fell into indiscreet exchanges with Thomas Wakefield. Cranmer, whose own position was suddenly more precarious, called them and others to account, reporting their tactlessness to others of the Privy Council in case he should be implicated personally. The lawyers, who had speculated upon the king's dalliance with Katherine Howard and had mentioned her affinity to Anne Boleyn, faced a very severe carpeting. On 7 July Gwent presented to Convocation the king's commission to begin the process of annulment: Stephen Gardiner having expounded the case, the examination and determination of the matter was assigned to a senior committee, of whom Gardiner and Cuthbert Tunstall, Gwent and Thirlby were chosen to hear the witnesses. The judgement was completed and signed on 9 July. The King dissolved the Convocation on 28 July, the day of Cromwell's execution.

=== Convocation of 1542–43 ===
In late January 1540/41 Gwent was appointed to a fresh commission for the seeking-out of heresies in London, led by Edmund Bonner. Cranmer had newly confirmed the proctors to the Dean of the Arches when, a year later, in January 1541/42, Gwent resumed his role as prolocutor. This Convocation addressed several important reforms in ten sessions over the following two months. The King signified that he wished them to deliberate upon matters of religion which had lapsed or decayed. They were also to discuss and revise the texts of the English Old and New Testaments, and to look into and reform the canon law statute concerning simony (the selling of benefices). A session on the reform of the wording of Sunday prayer, the Ave Maria and the Ten Commandments was taken over by Gardiner, who wished the clergy to consider the most suitable English equivalents for a great many words occurring in the sacred texts. The Sarum Use was to prevail. A motion that the Universities should approve the revision of texts was opposed. Many of these matters pertained to the revisions of the Great Bible.

These sessions being concluded (in which Gwent had a prominent role), Bonner's Letter of Admonition to all readers of the Bible, and his injunctions to his clergy, were issued later in the same year. In April 1542 Gwent was installed Archdeacon of Huntingdon. The Convocation was resumed in February 1542/43, and on 12 April 1543 Gwent was granted the prebend of Tottenhall in the jurisdiction of St Paul's. A principal outcome of this assembly, presented in that April, was the revision or "diligent review" of the "Bishop's Book" (of 1537), also called The Institution of a Christen Man, which was improved as A Necessary Doctrine and Erudition for any Christen Man, also called the "King's Book". The various revised sections were passed from the Bishops to Dr Gwent, who read them before the clergy of the lower house and received their comments and approval. The sessions were wound up at the end of April.

During the spring of 1543 the accusations of heresy against Cranmer arising from the Prebendaries' Plot, led covertly against Cranmer by Gardiner, came to a head. There are few mentions of Gwent among the lengthy records of Cranmer's investigations in Kent, but at one point Edmund Shether, a hostile witness, is said to have remarked that Dr Gwent could be depended upon to assist Cranmer by finding means to render the evidence of other witnesses inadmissible. Gwent continued active in his last months, hearing the case of Fayrfax v. Fayrfax in June 1543.

=== Death and legacies ===
The King granted a special dispensation to Dr Gwent to wear his bonnet in the royal presence, since he had certain infirmities in his head which made it dangerous for it to be uncovered. This was on 18 July 1543, and on 21 July Gwent, in sickness, made his will.

His father and mother, and two married brothers (John and Thomas), were then living. His father and brother John had the farm of premises called "Two Meases" or "le Stones" in Monmouthshire, "and nowe my brother Thomas and his wiffe have the fee simple for him and for his heires for ever, after the deathe of one Watkynne ap Hoell which hathe a state for terme of his lyffe in the saide grounde receyving xlvi.s viij.d yerely of my father and my brother John during the lyffe of the forseyde Watkynne ap Hoell." Holding three archdeaconries, three prebends and six rectories (including Walton in the Wirrall, Newchurch and North Wingfield), Gwent was at pains to explain that he had received little in dilapidations in his various preferments and had little to pass on to his successors. In particular he states having received "not a farthing" from Richard Fetherston (who had been executed in 1540). He has bestowed all that he had from his predecessors at Walton, Lancs. (where his patron was Sir William Molyneaux) "on the Quear there which was veray obscure and darke and nowe I thancke god it is lightsome and faire". These affairs were to be dealt with by his executor "Maister Powell, Thomas ap Hoell prebendary of Lychfelde". Various gifts are made to David Pole.

Dr Richard Gwent died at the end of July 1543, and his desire was to be buried in the middle of St Paul's Cathedral, "directly before the Sacrament which hanges alway at the highe aulter in Pawles". His will was proved in 1544, and at the Convocation on 18 January that year the first action was to appoint John Oliver his successor as prolocutor. As Richardus Ventamus juridicus, Gwent is eulogised for his virtues and learning in John Leland's 'Encomia,' where he remarks that Gwent had powers to resolve the most stubborn problems, and that his advocacy was like bolts of lightning when parties could not agree:

"... novit tua sit facundia quanta,
quae vel dura quidem saxa movere solet."
"... sunt tua causidico fulmina nota foro:
fulmina cordatos terrentia saepe patronos,
quum partes nequeunt constabilire suas."

Thomas Powell

Gwent's executor, Thomas Powell, had been a contemporary of his at All Souls College. He now succeeded him as prebendary of Longdon, and was also presented as prebendary of Wisborough, Chichester diocese, by Thomas Gwent and Richard Hyde. Powell died in 1551: much of his will is concerned with outstanding matters relating to Gwent's probate, and he has kept a book of accounts and inventory relating to it in a coffer at Lichfield. There is still plenty to be done. He gives all his lands in Oxfordshire to Katheryn Bulkeley, late abbess of Godstow, for life. He gives the advowson of Standish "to Thomas Gwente, John Gwente and their mother", on condition that they do not sell it. David Pole is his executor.

Thomas Gwent

In 1539 Thomas Gwent, together with his brother Richard Gwent and Thomas Powell, was among the feoffees for the royal physician George Owen (of Godstow) in devolving his manor of Erdyngton in Oxfordshire. Thomas Gwent was licensed in February 1547 to alienate "a messuage, five acres and two pastures called "Stones" alias "Gregos", formerly two islands in Llantrisham in the marches of Wales" (Llantrisant on the river Usk), to James Gunter of London, gentleman. This (as stated also in Richard Gwent's will) had been purchased of (Richard) Andrewes (of Daventry): Andrewes was a major speculator in former monastic property at Hailes, Gloucestershire and elsewhere, and Gunter, of Abergavenny, was a speculating M.P. and commissioner.

Before 1548 Thomas Gwent (gentleman) acquired copyhold of Buckland manor (including Burhill) in Gloucestershire, near Evesham, which had been conveyed by Gloucester Abbey in 1535/36 to James and Joan Apparry and their daughters, and by them to Sir Henry Jerningham, later Captain of the Yeomen of the Guard to Queen Mary. Gwent's mother was buried in Buckland church, and when making his will in July 1557 Thomas asked to be buried beside her. Making gifts to his brother John Gwent and sister-in-law, and to nephews William and Thomas Gwent, he left his estate to his son Richard, still aged under 24, in the care of his widow Anne, entrusting "my especiall good lorde Davy Pole" to oversee his son's welfare, and making him the gift of a ring. Pole, who had been slightly junior to Richard Gwent at All Souls, at his own death in 1568 left money for a University exhibition to Richard Gwent's nephew Richard, and also a ring with "RG" monogram "ioyned togeather" which had belonged to his uncle.

Whether this was the same Thomas Gwent, scholar of Oxford, warden of the free chapel of St Cenydd at Llangennith, Glamorgan, who appears in a suit against Llewys Wyllyams of c. 1540, is not clear.
