= John Tregonwell =

Cornish jurist

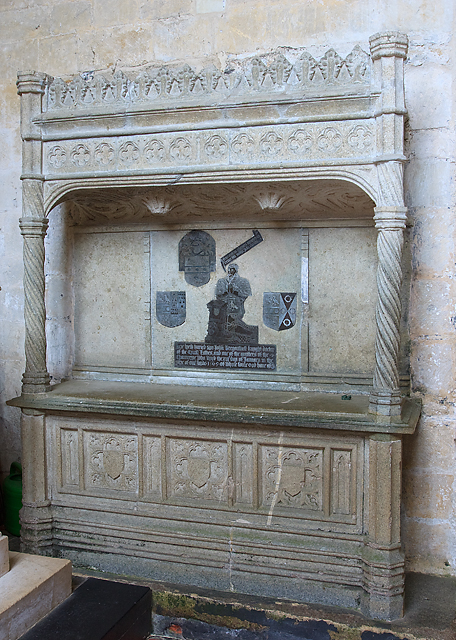
Tomb of Sir John Tregonwell

Sir John Tregonwell (died 1565) was a Cornish jurist, a principal agent of Henry VIII and Thomas Cromwell in the Dissolution of the Monasteries. He served as Judge of the High Court of Admiralty from 1524 to 1536.

== Early life ==
He was born in Cornwall, the second son of his family: he also had a sister named Alice, who married William Southcott of Chudleigh, Devon, and was the mother of the jurist John Southcote (born c. 1510). Tregonwell was educated at Oxford, initially at Broadgates Hall. He obtained a Bachelor of Civil Law on 30 June 1516, and Doctor of Civil Law on 23 June 1522. Before leaving Oxford he became principal of Vine Hall. A record exists that he was constituted a Judge in the Admiralty Courts in the time of Lord High Admiral William Fitzwilliam, giving a date of about 1524.

== Career ==
In December 1527 Tregonwell, LL.D., was named to a commission to inquire into and punish treasons, murders and piracies at sea, within the jurisdiction of the Admiralty, a commission renewed in January 1530/31. In 1528 as juris civilis doctor and judex curie Admirallitatis he issued a precept for an arrest as from the Admiralty Court. In 1528-1529 he assisted Rowland Lee in the visitation of Thetford Priory, and in a letter of March 1529 the Abbot of Briwerne thanked Thomas Cromwell for the trouble taken on his behalf, as Dr Tregonwell and John Wadham had informed him. In May and June 1532 he and Dr William Knight (Archdeacon of Richmond) were engaged in diplomatic negotiations in the Netherlands, settling disputes between the Flemish merchants and the English Merchant Adventurers. After various threats to dissolve the diet, the Notarial instrument was signed at Dunkirk in their presence on 30 May. On 11 July 1532, in a consultation concerning sea business, he appears as "Master John Tregonwell, Doctor of Laws, Official commissary, or Judge, of the High Court of Admiralty", with Thomas Bagard, Doctor of Laws, as his Surrogate in that court. He became principal judge or commissary-general, and acted in various Admiralty commissions.

He was introduced to the Privy Council as early as October 1532; and with the appointment of Thomas Cranmer as Archbishop of Canterbury in March 1533, Tregonwell rapidly became a useful figure in affairs of state. With Thomas Bedyll, John Cockes and Richard Gwent, he was one of the four witnesses summoned by Cranmer in March 1533 to hear his private protestation on the eve of his Consecration. At the Convocation of April 1533, Dr Tregonwell appeared as proctor for the King in the matter of the royal divorce, to require that their decisions concerning two questions should be brought into written form and published. On 8 May Cranmer held court in the Lady Chapel of Dunstable Priory, with the Bishops of Lincoln and Winchester and with several doctors of law, Dr Tregonwell among them, as counsellors in the law for the King's part. Lady Katherine was called but did not appear, and was held to be contumacious: examination of the evidence and witnesses proceeded. On 23 May at Dunstable, Cranmer declared the marriage dissolved, and Tregonwell's short message went at once to Cromwell at Westminster. He was soon afterwards granted an annuity of £40 for life.

With Chancellor Audeley, Secretary Cromwell, Almoner Fox and Richard Gwent, he signed the two treaties of peace of 1534 with Scotland on behalf of King Henry. He also took part in the proceedings against the London Carthusians, against Sir Thomas More, and against Anne Boleyn. He became a Master in Chancery by 1536, and was appointed to receive petitions in the Lords in parliaments commencing in 1536, and in that year held a commission to receive and examine rolls.

Tregonwell's great business was, however, his agency in the dissolution of the monasteries. His main part lay in taking surrenders. His correspondence, of which there is less than of some of the other visitors, gives a more favourable impression of him than of Legh or Layton, and he adopts a firmer tone in writing to Cromwell. He visited Oxford University in 1535; otherwise his work lay mainly in the south and west of England. With Dr Layton, Dr Legh and Dr Petre he was active in the interrogations of prisoners taken in the Pilgrimage of Grace, including George Lumley and Nicholas Tempest, and he was important enough for Cromwell to talk about him as a possible Master of the Rolls. He became a master in chancery in 1539, was chancellor of Wells Cathedral from 1541 to January 1543, a commissioner in chancery in 1544, and a commissioner of the great seal in 1550.

== Honours and recognition ==
In Queen Mary's accession, in 1553, she appointed judges led by Tregonwell, with William Roper, David Pole, Anthony Draycot and others, to examine the claim of Edmund Bonner that his deprivation (under Edward VI) as Bishop of London had been invalid. In the reversal of religious policy, the reinstatement of the deprived Catholic bishops was for Mary an important component in her reform. Dr Tregonwell himself pronounced the definitive sentence in Bonner's favour, resulting in his restitution, on 5 September 1553, thereby overturning the former sentence of Cranmer, and laying the fault of the injustice upon the distinguished judges who had approved it. Tregonwell was knighted on 2 October 1553.

He was Member of Parliament for Scarborough in the parliament of October 1553, and, though he held a prebend, there was no objection to his return, doubtless because he was a layman. Alexander Nowell was ejected from parliament, and Tregonwell was one of the committee which sat to consider his case. In 1555 he was a commissioner on imprisoned preachers.

== Death and burial ==
Sir John Tregonwell died on 8 or 13 January 1564/65 at Milton Abbas, Dorset (for which, after the Dissolution, he paid £1,000). His will was proved on 30 May 1565.

=== Monument and heraldry ===
He was buried, and his monument was raised, in the presbytery north of the sanctuary (now forming the north aisle) in the magnificent surroundings of Milton Abbey church. The monument is an altar tomb of Purbeck marble, the chest, with quatrefoil panels enclosing plain shields, supported on a moulded plinth. Over this, supported forward on two barley-twist columns which rise into octagonal corner turrets, is a stone canopy with a frieze of quatrefoils with pierced foliate cresting above. The underside of the canopy is carved with ornamental tracery, with two pendants (as from a pendant vault) from which the finials are missing.

The wall panel at the back of the tomb has a complete group of six latten insets. Sir John, who has a full pointed beard, appears centrally (turning three-quarters to his right) in armour and tabard, kneeling at a prayer desk with an open book lying on an armorial cloth: tabard and cloth bear the arms of Tregonwell. He wears a neck chain, and his helm and gauntlets are placed in front of the desk. From his mouth proceeds a prayer scroll or label inscribed "Nos autem gloriari oportet in cruce D'ni nostri Jesu Christi" (We ought rather to glory in the Cross of our Lord Jesus Christ) in black letter. Below this scene is a rectangular plate with this black-letter inscription:

"Here lyeth buried Syr John Tregonwell knyghte doctor of the Cyvill Lawes, & one of the maisters of the Chauncerye who died the xiii^{th} day of Januarye in the yere . of our Lorde . 1565 . of whose soule God have m[er]cy."

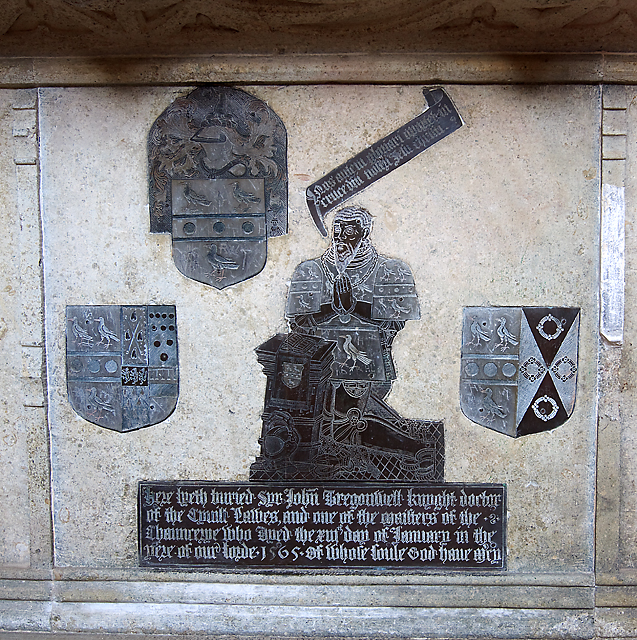
Detail of tomb, showing heraldry (right of picture) for marriage to Newce of Oxford, and (left) for marriage to Kelloway of Rockbourne.

The remainder of the group consists of three armorial plates, one raised above and a little to Sir John's right (away from which his prayer scroll ascends, as if in repudiation of worldly honours), and two shield-shaped escutcheons, one to Sir John's left and one to his right. The first, above, represents the arms of Tregonwell on a shield with the crested helm in mantling above (bracketed tinctures not shown on the brass):

- (Tregonwell): [Argent] three pellets in fess cotised [sable] between three Cornish choughs proper. Crest: A Cornish chough proper holding in the beak a chaplet [ermine and sable].

The two shield-shaped plates are heraldic impalements representing Sir John's two marriages. The first marriage (to his left side), to an heiress named Newce, is the impalement of Tregonwell with Newce or Newes of Oxford:

- (Newes): Gyronny of four [gules and or], as many chaplets counterchanged.

The second marriage (to his right side), to Elizabeth Kelloway, is the impalement of Tregonwell with (in the sinister pale) a quartering for Kelloway, embodying the Kelloway connection with the former lords of Rockbourne, Hampshire:

- (1. Kelloway): [Argent], two grosing irons in saltire [sable] between four Kelway pears proper within a bordure engrailed [of the second].
- (2. Bysset): [Azure], ten bezants 4, 3, 2, 1.
- (3. attributed to Bingham): Ermine, three lions rampant on a chief [sable].
- (4. attributed to Romsey): [Argent], a fess [gules], under a label of five points.

A long elegiac poem for Tregonwell was published by George Turbervile in his Epitaphs, Epigrams, Songs and Sonnetts of 1567.

== Family ==
There has been much confusion about Tregonwell's wives.

Tregonwell married first an heiress Newce, of Oxfordshire by whom he had issue:

- Thomas Tregonwell, who married (1) Lady Villars, and (2) his own step-sister, Ann Martyn. He died during his father's lifetime, whereupon his son John Tregonwell fell heir to Sir John's property.
- Anne Tregonwell married Richard Reade, Lord Chancellor of Ireland.
- Mary Tregonwell (according to John Burke) married a De la Lynde, a family associated with the Binghams of Melcombe Bingham.

Sir John's second wife was Elizabeth, the daughter of Sir John Kellaway (died 1547) of Rockbourne, Hampshire, and his wife Anne (daughter of Henry) Strangways. At her marriage to Tregonwell, which occurred at Puddletown on 15 June 1549, Elizabeth was the widow of Robert Martyn (died 1548) of Athelhampton, Dorset, by whom she had six sons and three daughters. (The terms of her first, then forthcoming, marriage to Robert are outlined by Christopher Martyn of Puddletown in his will of 1525). There were no children of her second marriage.

=== Aftermath ===
Following John Tregonwell's death, there was a dispute between Dame Elizabeth Tregonwell (née Kellaway) and her step-grandson John Tregonwell (son of Elizabeth Newce's son Thomas). This involved a fight over a barn, which left one of her step-grandson's men dead and another pinned to the wall by a sheaf of arrows. Dame Elizabeth was also found to be keeping under her protection a young Roman Catholic called Thomas Sherwood. Her own son by her first marriage, George Martin, gave Sherwood up to the authorities. This led to Sherwood's execution in 1579 and Elizabeth Tregonwell's examination for recusancy in 1580. She got off lightly, being required only to pay maintenance on Milton Abbey Church. Elizabeth's recusancy charges must have stood in stark contrast to her husband's reputation as a leading figure in implementing and profiting from the Dissolution of the Monasteries. Dame Elizabeth Tregonwell, Sir John's widow, made her will on 8 September 1576 and it was proved on 15 May 1584: she states in as many words that Robert Martyn had been her first husband.
