= Lord President of Wales =

Medieval head of Wales and the Marches

- Arglwydd Lywydd Cymru
- Member of: Council of Wales and the Marches; Privy Council
- Seat: Ludlow Castle
- Final holder: Charles Gerard, 1st Earl of Macclesfield
- Abolished: 1689

The Lord President of Wales (Welsh: Arglwydd Lywydd Cymru), also known as the Lord President of the Marches of Wales, was the head of the Council of Wales and the Marches, and the de jure head of the governance and legal administration of Wales.

The Lord President was first based at Shrewsbury before an official court was established at Ludlow Castle where the President, Council of Wales and the court of the Prince of Wales were responsible for governing all of Wales and the Welsh Marches until the Presidency and council were disbanded in 1689 as a result of political centralisation following The Glorious Revolution.

== History ==
=== Early history ===
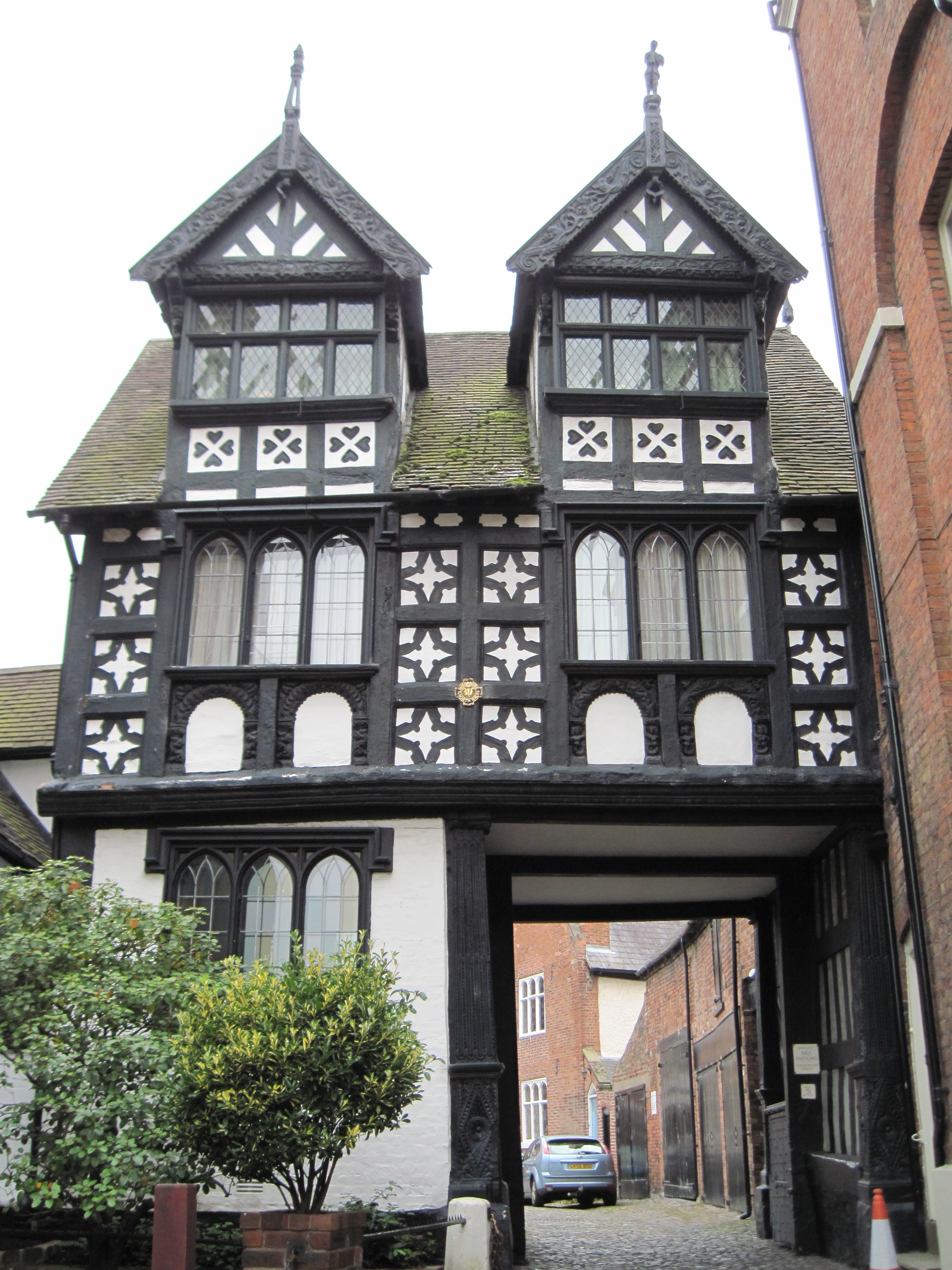
Gate house of the headquarters of the Council of Wales and the Marches at Shrewsbury. The Council buildings survive today near Shrewsbury Castle

It is unclear when an office of President or Lord President of Wales was first established but the "Lordship of the Marchers" was established sometime during the two centuries of on-going struggle to subdue the Welsh following the Norman Invasion of Wales. One of the first written records is in the Brut y Tywysogion which states that Henry I of England made Richard de Belmeis I the "President" and "Lieutenant" of Wales early in the twelfth century and that he continued in these positions for a long time at Shrewsbury.

The English crown made many attempts to establish a level of governance not only over the rebellious Welsh, but also over the Norman Marcher Lords whose actions in Wales fell outside the jurisdiction of England. These Lords enjoyed a unique level of independence and power from the English crown, with the Earl of Gloucester even stating that he ruled "sicut regale" (as a king) in Wales, although Norman hegemony was never permanently effective and even the areas under their control were more characteristically a lawless and violent frontier society.

Following the Conquest of Gwynedd (the last independent kingdom in Wales), the King of England now directly controlled the governance of the Principality of Wales (which included its own institutions and counties), while the rest of Wales was indirectly under his control via the fealty of the Marcher Lords. Around 141 such powerful Lordships existed from this time, and were exceptionally powerful and unruly causing problems for many English kings up until the Tudor period.

These issues reached a nadir for the English crown during the Second Barons' War when many Welsh fought with the Barons against king Henry III of England and the Welsh Marches became the scene of some of the heaviest fighting of the period. This prompted a re-establishment of authority over the Lords with Henry commanding Geoffrey de Geneville, who held lands at Ludlow, to repair the local defences and to prevent any future incursions into the Marches by Welsh forces. Over the following year orders would be issued from Ludlow Castle to all Marcher Lords in Roger de Mortimer's campaign against the Welsh.

=== Consolidation of power ===
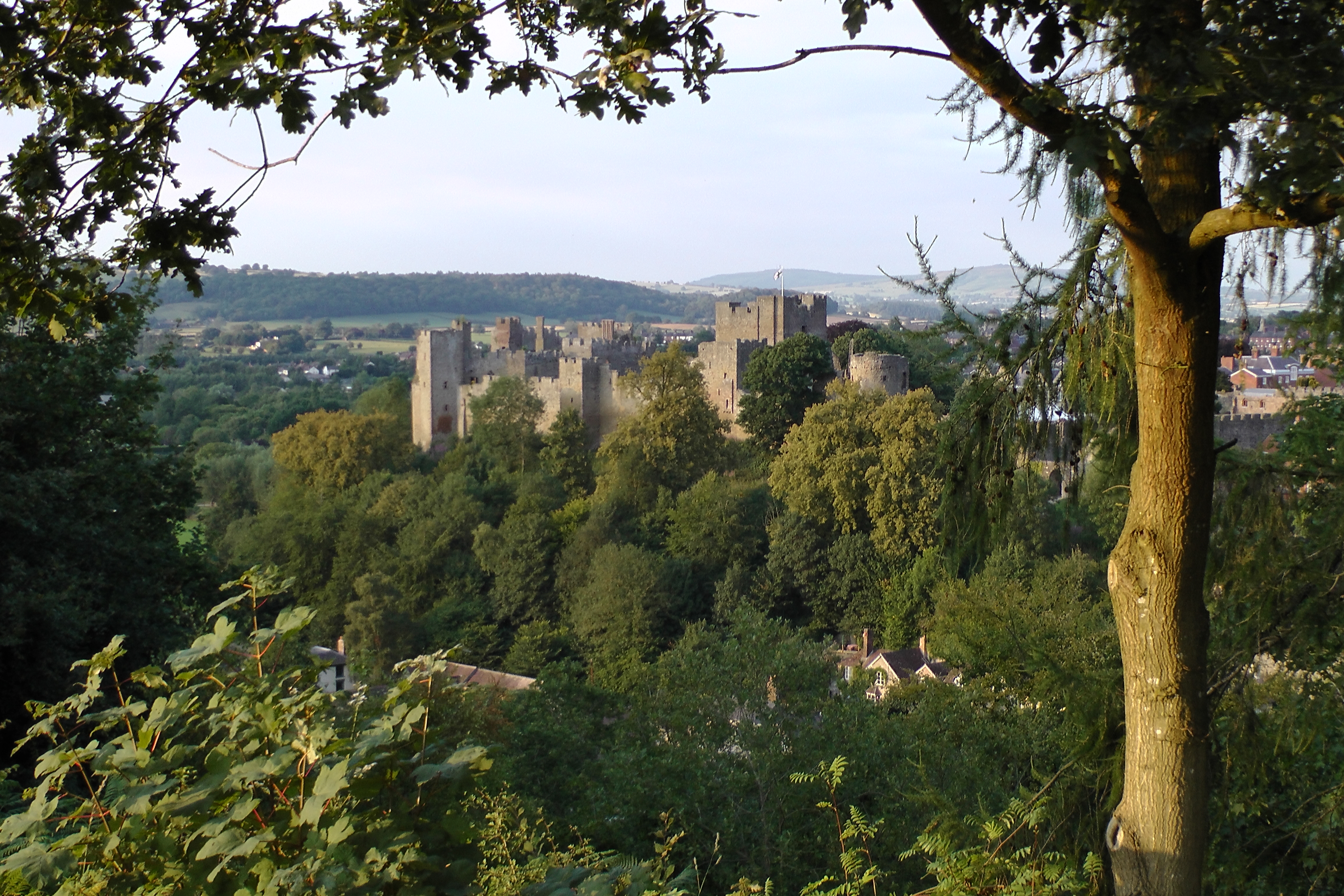
While early Lord Presidents were seated at Shrewsbury, Ludlow Castle became the seat of the Lord President of Wales for much of its history.

Repression of the Welsh followed the Glyndŵr rebellion, and the institution of The Penal Laws in 1401 and 1402 saw all Welshmen (and Englishmen who married Welsh women) prohibited from holding government positions, holding public gatherings or bearing arms.

While these laws were continued and reaffirmed throughout the fifteenth century, a new legal structure for Wales was implemented in 1472 when Edward IV established the Council of Wales and the Marches at Shrewsbury with John Alcock as Lord President of Wales. In the following year, Edward greatly extended the remit of the President and Council, who was charged with maintaining law and order throughout the numerous rebellions that followed Glyndŵr's uprising. As well as legal, religious and royal actions, the new powers saw the President investigate charges brought against other Government officials and even overturning the decisions of juries in English courts. The council would even hear appeals from the "oppressed poor" of Wales, who were otherwise simply too impoverished to bring their cases to court under English law.

While the Lord President of Wales oversaw "a remarkable experiment in regional government", and was a significant place of appeal for Welsh people. the repressive laws continued until the accession of Henry VII to the English throne. Henry, who was of Welsh lineage is said to have wanted to end the oppression of the Welsh people, and he is known to have made numerous attempts to reform the jurisdiction of Wales, sending his young heir, Arthur Prince of Wales to establish his royal household within Ludlow Castle so that his court would oversee the work of both the President and Council.

As Arthur's authority was extended over the Lord Presidency and Council of Wales, he was given new powers such as the ability to appoint justices of oyer and terminer. By 1501 Arthur and his new wife, Catherine of Aragon were an active part of the administration at Ludlow, until Arthur died just six months later aged fifteen. Henry seems to have entrusted few of the responsibilities Arthur had to the new Prince of Wales, the future Henry VIII of England, and the Royal court at Ludlow came to an end. By April 1502 Governance of Wales and the Marches once again reverting to administration by the council and a new Lord President, with full responsibility for the exercise of royal power.

The authority and power of the Lord President would be further consolidated in English law during the reign of Henry VIII. The Laws in Wales Acts 1535–1542 (also known as the Acts of Union) ended the piecemeal governance of Wales by abolishing the Marcher Lords and organising all territory in Wales and the Marches into English style "shires" under English Law. The act gave statutory responsibility for the governance of these new entities to the Court of the Lord President of Wales and the Council of Wales and the Marches, with both being officially seated at Ludlow Castle. The changes also saw all legal cases deemed "Nisi Prius" or of civil right tried at Ludlow before the Lord President.

In consolidating the power of the Lord President, these acts finally stripped the Marcher Lords of their jura regalia power and independence.

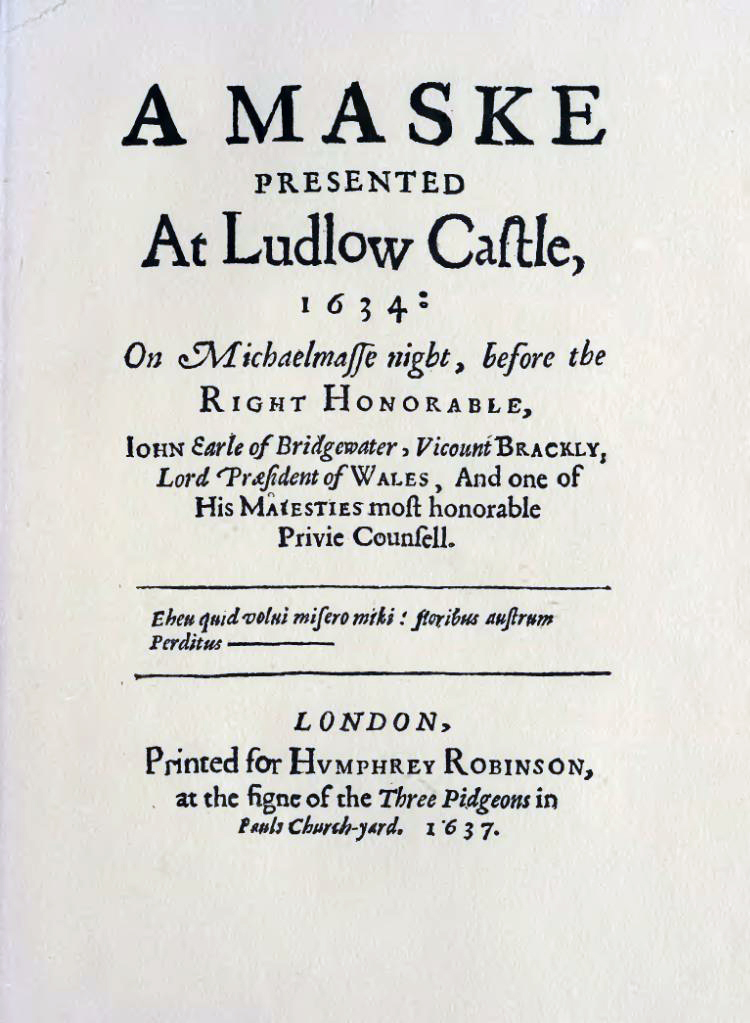
The title page of John Milton's Comus, first performed in 1634 for the Lord President of Wales at Ludlow castle

=== Civil War and abolishment ===
As an effective viceroy for Wales, the office of Lord President was suspended with the outbreak of the First English Civil War and remained as such until the Restoration, when it was re-established at Ludlow under the Welsh nobleman, Richard Vaughan, 2nd Earl of Carbery. Vaughan appointed the poet Samuel Butler as his secretary and it is known that Butler wrote at least part of Hudibras at Ludlow. Vaughan's twelve years as Lord President is marked by turmoil. He made an unsuccessful attempted to extend the jurisdiction of his office over Gloucestershire before being unceremoniously removed from office in 1672 on the account of numerous charges of ill-treatment of servants and tenants at his ancestral home of Dryslwyn.

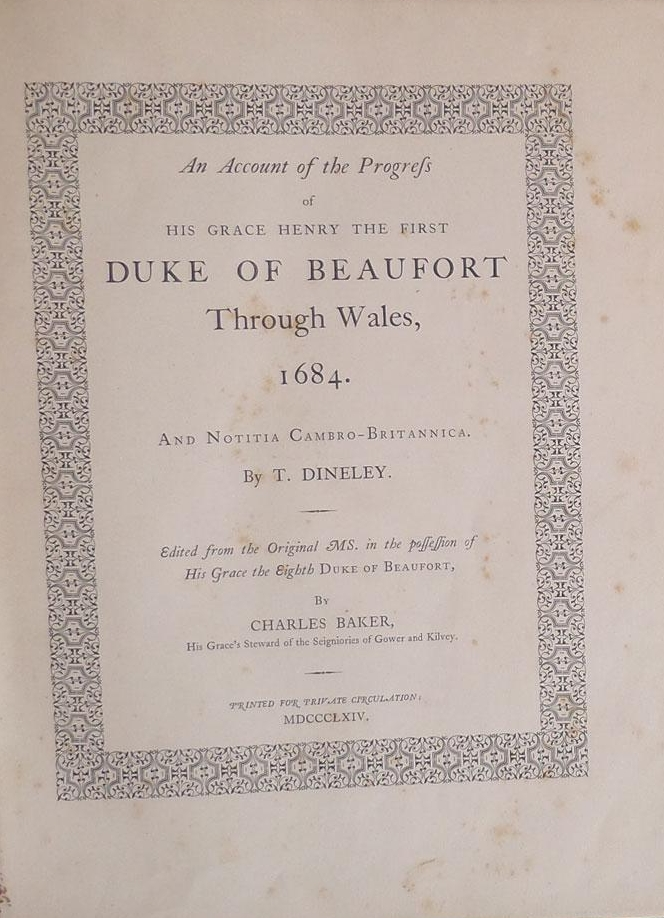
Henry Somerset was accompanied on his 1684 Presidential tour of Wales by Thomas Dineley whose account of the progress recorded the opulent conditions that the later Presidents enjoyed.

Vaughan was succeeded by Henry Somerset, 1st Duke of Beaufort who was notable for his presidential tour of Wales. Somerset was accompanied on this "official progress" by Thomas Dineley, whose journal of the sumptuous entertainments the progress enjoyed (originally kept under the title of Notitia Cambro-Britannica), was later published as The Account of the Official Progress of His Grace Henry, the First Duke of Beaufort through Wales in 1684. Somerset's time as president also marks the beginning of the Glorious Revolution.

Finally, with the conclusion of the Glorious Revolution and the succession of William III of England in 1689, Charles Gerard, 1st Earl of Macclesfield was appointed president. The succession of the new king saw many constitutional changes and the continuation of a Presidency of Wales was brought into question. A petition for the end of the office and court drew 18,000 signatures from inhabitants of Wales, while the ever increasing cost of the Presidential office and court were vexatious to the new administration. As such, both the Presidency and the Court would be abolished within a year.

== List of Lord Presidents of Wales ==
Name	Term of office		Notes
Richard de Belmeis I	11th c.		Named as Lieutenant and President in the Brut y Tywysogion, ruled at Shrewsbury.
John Alcock	1473	1500	
William Smyth	1502	1512	Appointed by Henry VII to be Lord President of Arthur's Council of Wales and Marches
Geoffrey Blythe	1512	1525	
John Vesey	1525	1534	
Rowland Lee	1534	1543	Initiated a "reign of terror", during which it is claimed that Lee hanged 5,000 Welshmen.
Richard Sampson	1543	1549	
John Dudley, 1st Duke of Northumberland	1549	1550	
William Herbert, 1st Earl of Pembroke	1550	1553	
Nicholas Heath	1553	1555	
William Herbert, 1st Earl of Pembroke	1555	1558	
Gilbert Bourne	1558	1559	
John Williams, 1st Baron Williams of Thame	1559	1559	
Henry Sidney	1560	1586	
Henry Herbert, 2nd Earl of Pembroke	1586	1601	
Edward la Zouche, 11th Baron Zouche	1602	1607	
Ralph Eure, 3rd Baron Eure	1607	1617	Eure's presidency was marked by a campaign from Sir Herbert Croft to remove the council's jurisdiction over a number of English counties.authority over the English counties was relaxed in 1606 but restored by royal decree in 1609
Thomas Gerard, 1st Baron Gerard	1617	1617	also Lord Lieutenant of Wales, served both offices for less than a year before resigning
William Compton, 1st Earl of Northampton	1617	1630	Not Lord Lieutenant of Wales, Glamorgan or Monmouthshire but held the lieutenantcies of Herefordshire, Shropshire and Worcestershire
John Egerton, 1st Earl of Bridgewater	1631	1642	John Milton wrote and performed Comus in celebration of his installation as Lord President of Wales
Interregnum
Richard Vaughan, 2nd Earl of Carbery	1660	1672	
Henry Somerset, 1st Duke of Beaufort	1672	1689	Conducted an official "progress" through Wales in 1684. Thomas Dineley recorded the Lord President's opulent conditions and entertainments.
Charles Gerard, 1st Earl of Macclesfield	1689	1689	Office abolished before death

== See also ==
- Council of Wales and the Marches
- Court of Great Sessions in Wales
- Lord Lieutenant of Wales
- Welsh law
- Welsh Marches
