= Council of Wales and the Marches =

Administrative body of the Kingdom of England (1473–1689)

History
- Founded: 13th Century
- Disbanded: 25 July 1689

Leadership
- Lord President of Wales: Charles Gerard, 1st Earl of Macclesfield (final)
- Vice President: Gervase Babington (final)

The Council of Wales and the Marches (Welsh: Cyngor Cymru a'r Gororau; officially the Court of the Council in the Dominion and Principality of Wales, and the Marches of the same), also called the Council of the Marches or the Councell in the Marches of Wales, was a regional administrative body within the Kingdom of England that was generally responsible for areas in modern-day Wales and the bordering Marches.

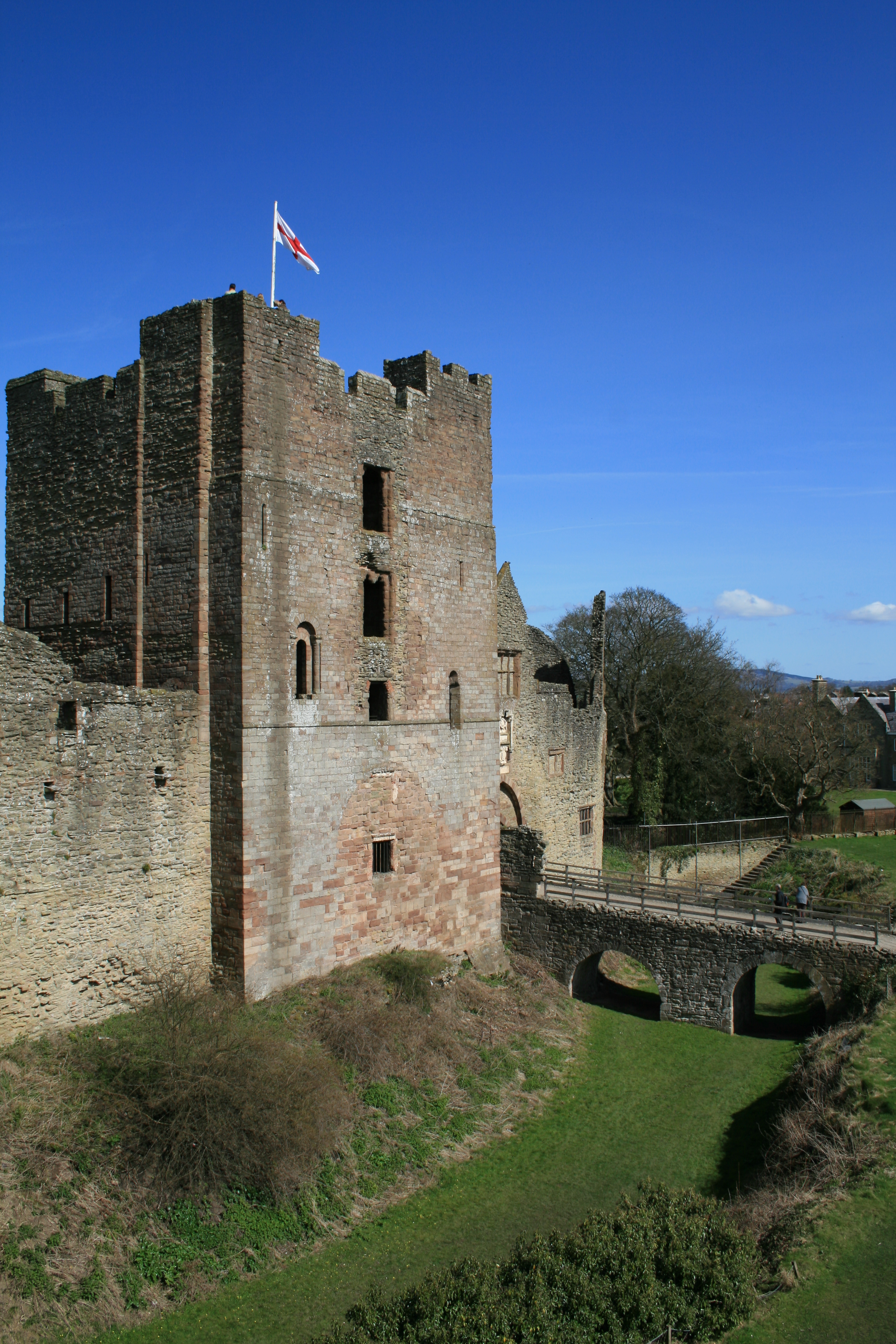
Ludlow Castle, a headquarters of the Council of the Marches

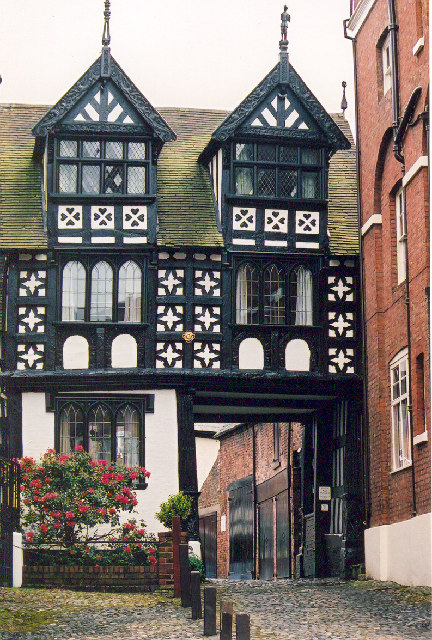
The Council House Gate House in Shrewsbury, another headquarters of the council

The council was founded in Shrewsbury and met there and in Ludlow

During its years of operation, between the 15th and 17th centuries, it was based between Ludlow Castle and the council's chambers near Shrewsbury Castle within the Kingdom of England. Its jurisdiction ranged widely, from judicial matters to public health and administration.

Its geographical area of responsibility varied but generally covered all of modern Wales and the Welsh Marches of Shropshire, Herefordshire, Worcestershire, Cheshire and Gloucestershire. The City of Bristol was exempted in 1562, and Cheshire in 1569.

It was similar to the Council of the North. Its archive is now in Shrewsbury.

== History ==
=== 15th century ===
The council was initially responsible for governing the lands held under the Principality of Wales, the lands directly administered by the English Crown following the Edwardian conquest of Wales in the 13th century. In 1457, Henry VI created for his son, Prince Edward, a council to rule Wales and the Marches, Cheshire, and Cornwall.

It was re-established by Edward IV of England as a body to counsel and act on behalf of his son, the infant Edward, Prince of Wales. King Edward had recently been restored to the monarchy during the Wars of the Roses, and he and his allies controlled most of the marcher lordships within and adjoining Wales. He established his son at Ludlow Castle, and appointed his allies from the Woodville and Stanley families as leading figures in the council.

=== 16th century ===
The council continued after the death of Edward IV and the disappearance of his son. Under Henry VII, the council was responsible for acting on behalf of his sons as successive Princes of Wales, first Arthur and then Henry.

The second Laws in Wales Act 1542 (34 & 35 Hen. 8. c. 26) gave the council statutory recognition; it had previously been based solely upon the king's prerogative. The full council was composed of the Lord President and his deputy, with twenty members nominated by the king; these included members of the royal household, some of the bishops of Wales, and the justices of the Court of Great Sessions. It continued to sit at Ludlow, and had responsibilities for the whole of Wales together with the Welsh Marches. These were initially deemed to comprise Cheshire, Shropshire, Herefordshire, Worcestershire and Gloucestershire; the City of Bristol was exempted in 1562, and Cheshire in 1569.

Worcestershire unsuccessfully attempted to free itself in 1576, and the council's authority over the English counties was relaxed in 1606 but restored by royal decree in 1609.

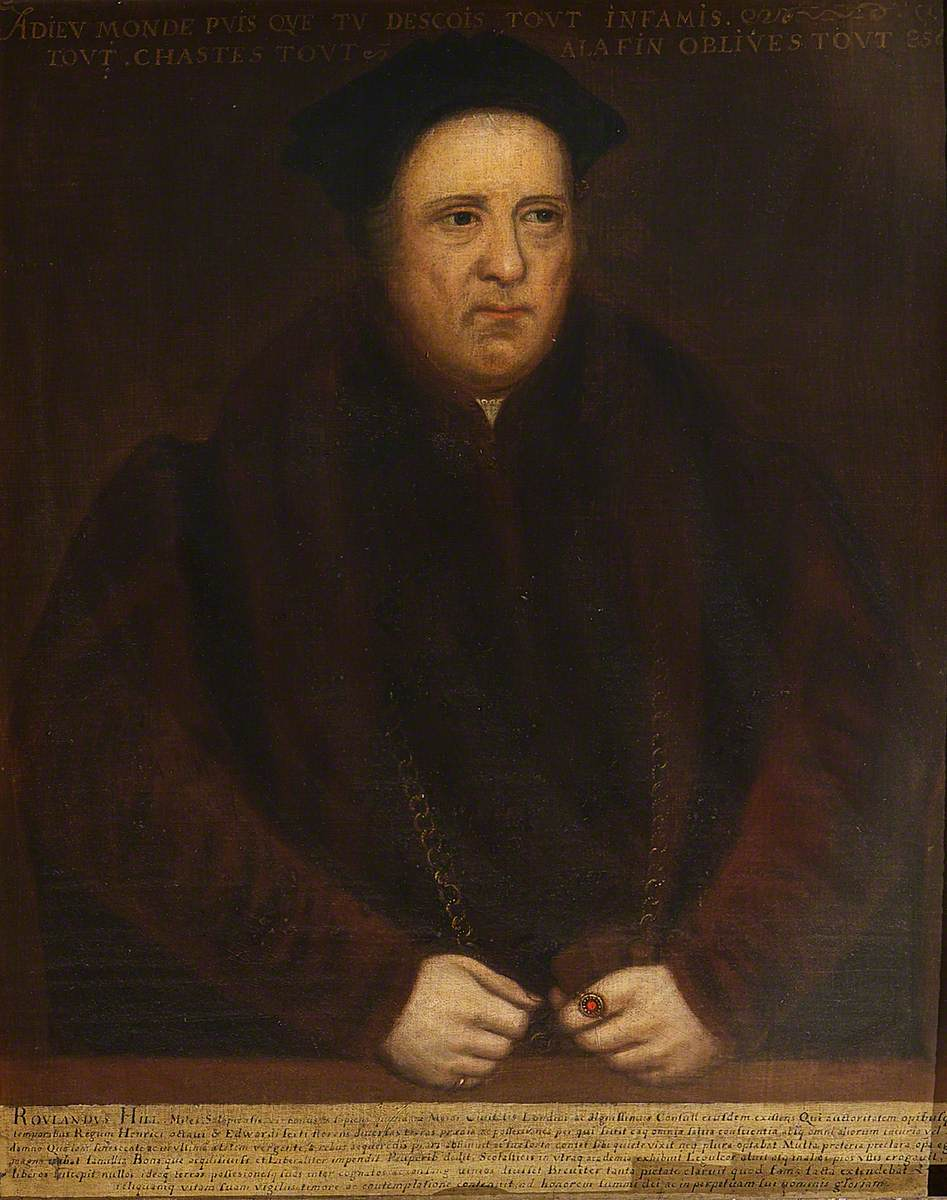
Sir Rowland Hill served on the council

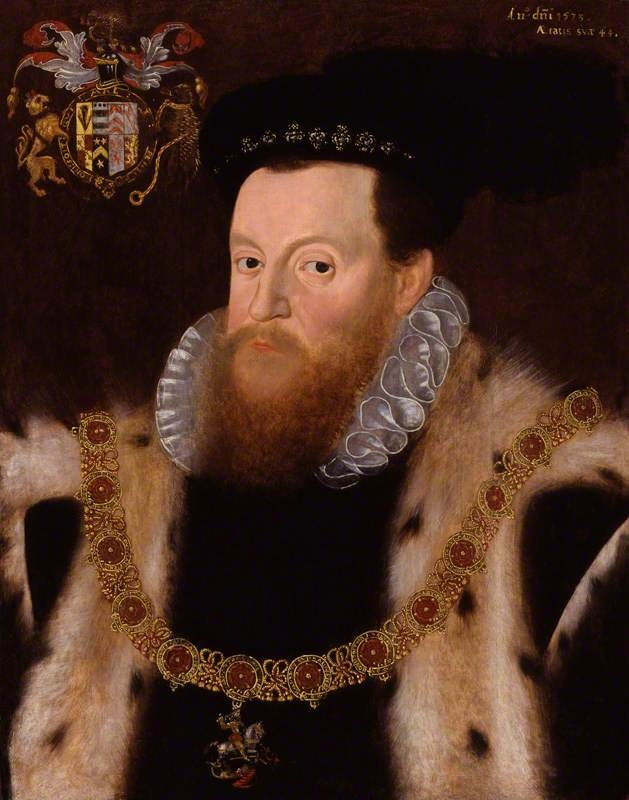
Sir Henry Sidney, lord president of the council

Leading figures on the council included Sir Rowland Hill and Sir Henry Sidney, (who was president of the council from 1560 to 1586).

According to historian John Davies, at its peak under Sidney and for a period thereafter the council:

represented a remarkable experiment in regional government. It administered the law cheaply and rapidly; it dealt with up to twenty cases a day and George Owen stated that the 'oppressed poor' flocked to it.

The legislation which gave statutory recognition to the council did not specify its role, but declared that the Lord President of Wales and council should have power to hear and determine "such Causes and Matters as be or heretofore hath been accustomed and used".

However, its functions were interpreted widely. It was to hear all suits, civil and criminal, which were brought by individuals too poor to sue at common law; it was to try all cases of murder, felony, piracy, wrecking, and such crimes as were likely to disturb the peace; it was to investigate charges of misgovernment by officials and the false verdicts of juries; it was to enforce the laws against livery and maintenance, to punish rumour mongers and adulterers, and to deal with disputes concerning enclosures, villein service, and manorial questions; it heard appeals from the common law courts; and it was responsible for administering the legislation dealing with religion.

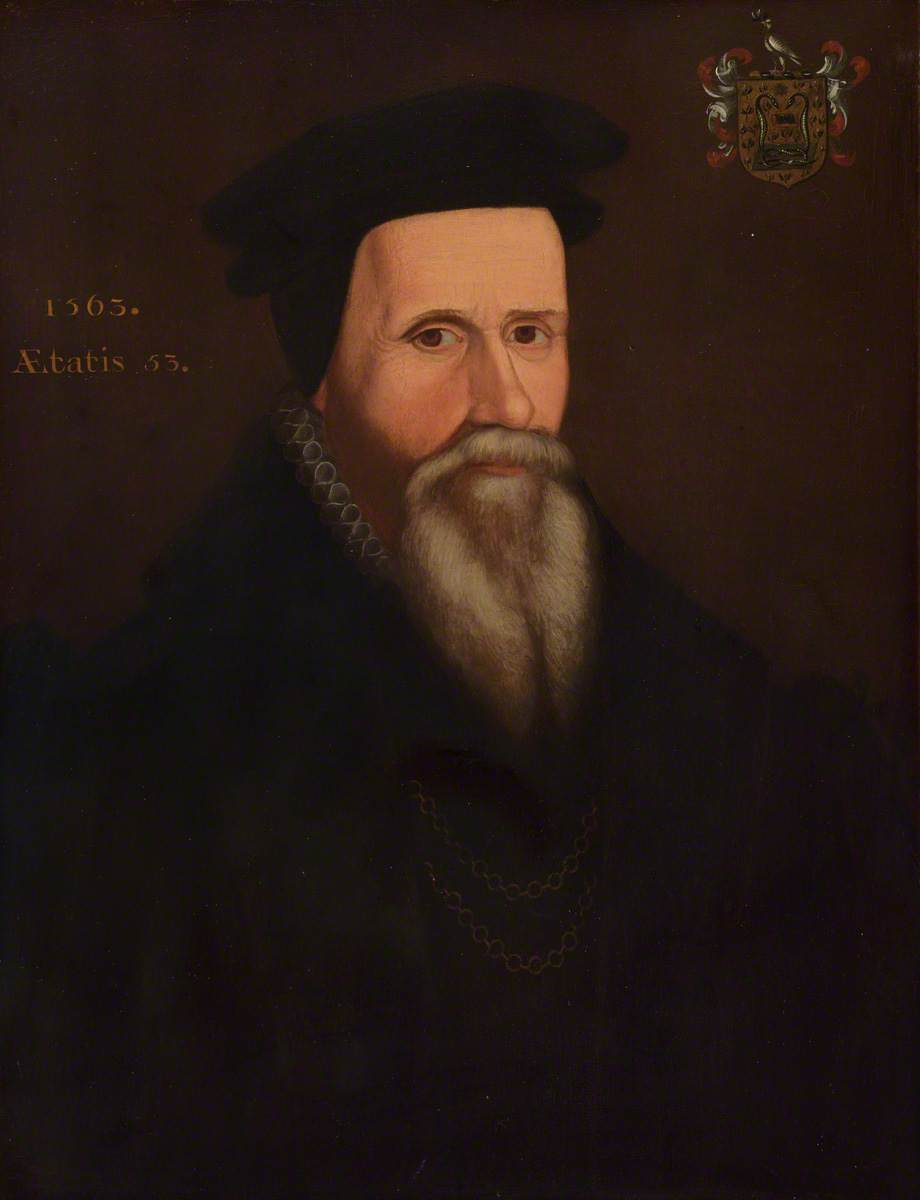
Dr John Caius attended to the sweating sickness in Shrewsbury on the instructions of the council.

It had charge of the public health response to the 1551 outbreak of sweating sickness in Shrewsbury, and appointed Dr John Caius to minister to it.

=== 17th century ===
Court of Marches of Wales Act 1688
- Act of Parliament
- Parliament of England
- Long title: An Act for takeing away the Court holden before the President and Councill of the Marches of Wales.
- Citation: 1 Will. & Mar. c. 27 (Note: This is the citation in The Statutes of the Realm.); 1 Will. & Mar. Sess. 1. c. 27 (Note: This is the citation in The Statutes at Large.)
- Territorial extent: England and Wales

Dates
- Royal assent: 25 July 1689
- Commencement: 1 June 1689 (Note: Section 3.)
- Repealed: 15 July 1867
Other legislation
Amends	Laws in Wales Act 1542
Amended by	Court of Marches of Wales Act 1697
Repealed by	Statute Law Revision Act 1867

Status: Repealed

Text of statute as originally enacted

Court of Marches of Wales Act 1697
- Act of Parliament
- Parliament of England
- Long title: An Act to execute Judgements & Decrees saved in a Clause in an Act of the First Yeare of the Reigne of King William and Queen Mary, intituled, "An Act for taking away the Court holden before the President and Council of the Marches of Wales.
- Citation: 9 Will. 3. c. 16
- Territorial extent: England and Wales

Dates
- Royal assent: 16 May 1698
- Commencement: 3 December 1697 (Note: Start of session.)
- Repealed: 15 July 1867
Other legislation
Amends	Court of Marches of Wales Act 1688
Repealed by	Statute Law Revision Act 1867
Relates to	Laws in Wales Act 1542; Court of Marches of Wales Act 1697

Status: Repealed

Text of statute as originally enacted

The council was abolished on 25 July 1689, following the Glorious Revolution of 1688 which overthrew James II and established William III (William of Orange) and Mary II as joint monarchs.

According to Davies, "when the Council at Ludlow was abolished ... there was very little protest in Wales. Instead, the Welsh gentry embraced London".

== Leadership ==
=== Presidents of the council ===
The following served as presidents of the council:

- 1473–1500: Bishop John Alcock
- c. 1501–1512: Bishop William Smyth
- 1512–1525: Bishop Geoffrey Blyth
- 1525–1534: Bishop John Vesey
- 1534–1543: Bishop Rowland Lee
- 1543–1549: Bishop Richard Sampson
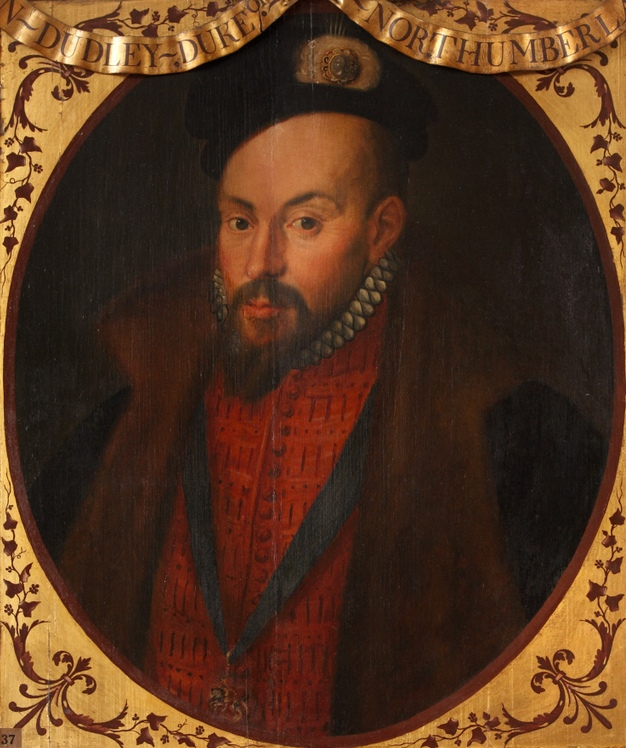
- John Dudley, Duke of Northumberland, sometime president of the council, executed for treason around the succession crisis for Jane Grey and Queen Mary I in 1553
  1549–1550: John Dudley, Earl of Warwick
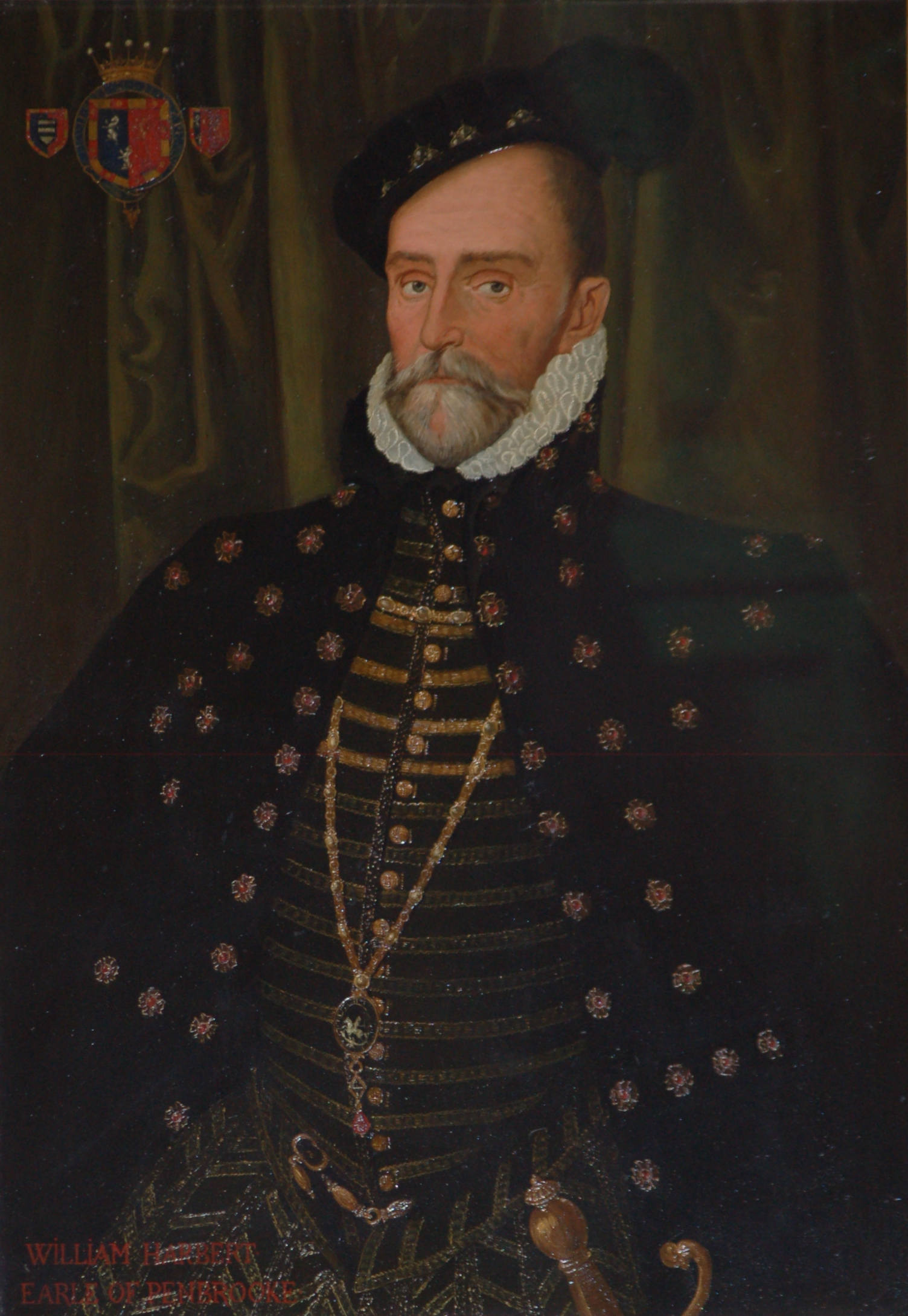
- 1st Earl of Pembroke, president of the council
  1550–1553: William Herbert, 1st Earl of Pembroke
- 1553–1555: Bishop Nicholas Heath
- 1555–1558: William Herbert, 1st Earl of Pembroke
- 1558–1559: Bishop Gilbert Bourne
- 1559: John Williams, 1st Baron Williams de Thame
- 1560–1586: Sir Henry Sidney
- 1586–1601: Henry Herbert, 2nd Earl of Pembroke
- 1601 (acting?): Sir Richard Lewknor
- 1602–1607: Edward la Zouche, 11th Baron Zouche
- 1607–1616: Ralph Eure, 3rd Baron Eure
- 1616–1617: Thomas Gerard, 1st Baron Gerard
- 1617–1630: William Compton, 1st Earl of Northampton
- 1631–1642: John Egerton, 1st Earl of Bridgewater
- 1660–1672: Richard Vaughan, 2nd Earl of Carbery
- 1672–1689: Henry Somerset, 1st Duke of Beaufort
- 1689: Charles Gerard, 1st Earl of Macclesfield

=== Vice-presidents of the council ===
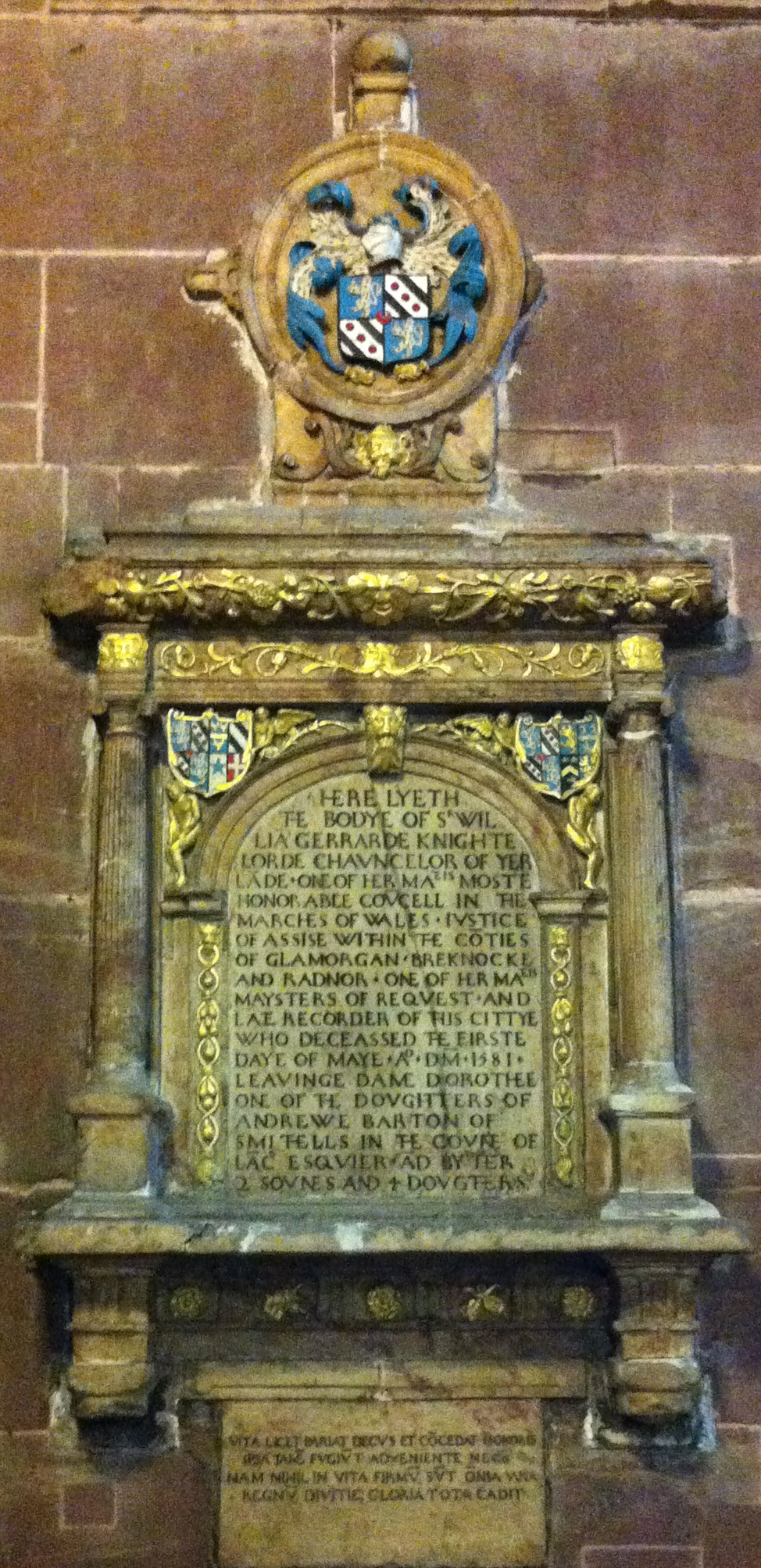
Memorial to William Gerard at Chester Cathedral; he is called One of Her Majestis Most Honorable Councell in the Marches of Wales.

The following served as vice-presidents of the council:

- 1550–1551: Sir James Croft
- 1559: Hugh Paulet
- 1562–1576: Sir William Gerard
- 1565–1569: John Throckmorton
- 1569–1571: Sir Hugh Cholmondeley
- 1575–1577: Andrew Corbet
- 1577–1580: Bishop John Whitgift
- 1605–?: Gervase Babington

In addition, from 1542 the Justice of Chester (from 1578 the Chief Justice of Chester) often acted as a de facto vice-president of the council, without formally holding the title.

== See also ==
- Council of the North
- Council of the West

== Bibliography ==
- Doyle, James William Edmund (1886). The Official Baronage of England: showing the succession, dignities, and offices of every peer from 1066 to 1885. Vol. 3. London: Longmans, Green & Co.
- Oxford Dictionary of National Biography. Oxford University Press. 2004.
- Griffiths, Ralph (1972). "Wales and the Marches in the Fifteenth Century". In Chrimes, Stanley; Ross, Charles; Griffiths, Ralph (eds.). Fifteenth Century England, 1399–1509: Studies in Politics and Society. Bristol: Sutton Publishing. pp. 145–72.
- Lowe, D (1977). "The council of the prince of Wales and the decline of the Herbert family during the second reign of Edward IV, 1471–83". Bulletin of the Board of Celtic Studies. 27: 278–97.
- Lowe, D (1980). "Patronage and politics: Edward IV, the Wydevills, and the council of the prince of Wales, 1471–83". Bulletin of the Board of Celtic Studies. 29: 545–73.
- Pollard, A. F. (July 1922). "Council, Star Chamber, and Privy Council under the Tudors: I. The Council". English Historical Review. 37 (147): 337–360. doi:10.1093/ehr/XXXVII.CXLVII.337. JSTOR 551704.
- Skeel, Caroline A. J. (January 1915). "The Council of the Marches in the Seventeenth Century". English Historical Review. 30 (117): 19–27. doi:10.1093/ehr/XXX.CXVII.19. JSTOR 550779.
- Williams, Penry (1956). "The Star Chamber and the council in the marches of Wales, 1558–1603". Bulletin of the Board of Celtic Studies. 16: 287–97.
- Williams, Penry (1958). The Council in the Marches of Wales under Elizabeth I. Cardiff: University of Wales Press.
- Williams, Penry (1961). "The attack on the council in the marches, 1603–42". Transactions of the Honourable Society of Cymmrodorion: 1–22.
- Williams, Penry (1961). "The activity of the council in the marches under the early Stuarts". Welsh History Review. 1: 133–66.
- Williams, Glanmor (1987). Recovery, Reorientation and Reformation: Wales c.1415–1642. History of Wales. Vol. 3. Oxford: Clarendon Press. ISBN 978-0-19-821733-6.
