= Thomas Dingley (antiquary) =

English antiquary

Thomas Dingley or Dineley (died 1695) was an English antiquary.

== Life ==
He was the son and heir of Thomas Dingley, controller of customs at Southampton; he was born about the middle of the seventeenth century, and, on his own account educated by James Shirley, the dramatist, who for some years kept a school in Whitefriars, London. In 1670 he was admitted a student of Gray's Inn. In the following year he became one of the suite of Sir George Downing, then returning as ambassador to the States-General of the United Provinces.

Henry Somerset, 1st Duke of Beaufort, as Lord President of Wales, took Dingley with him in 1684 on an official progress. Dingley was made an honorary freeman of the boroughs of Brecknock and Monmouth, wrote and sketched.

Dingley lived much at Dilwyn in Herefordshire, when not travelling. From the administration of his effects, granted in May 1695, it is known that he was at Leuven in Flanders when he died.

== Works ==
Dingley left in manuscript a journal of his Travails through the Low Countreys, Anno Domini 1674, illustrated by sketches in pen and ink. Subsequently, he made a tour in France, and wrote a similar illustrated record of his journey. In 1680 he visited Ireland, perhaps in a military capacity, and the account of what he there saw, and his observations on the history of the country, were published in 1870, as a reprint from the pages of the journal of the Kilkenny and South East of Ireland Archaeological Society. The manuscripts of all these accounts of travel came into the possession of Sir F. S. Winnington of Stanford Court, Worcestershire.

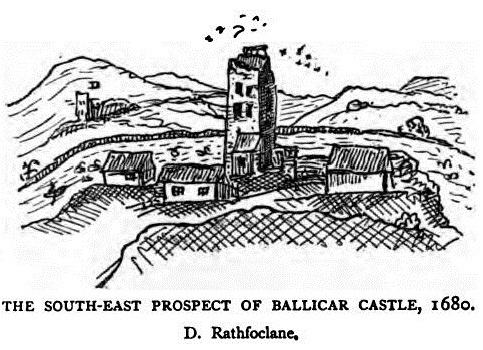
Ballycar Castle in western Ireland, sketch by Thomas Dineley.

The manuscript of Dingley's journal of the progress in Wales was kept by the Dukes of Beaufort. Part of it, under the title of Notitia Cambro-Britannica, was edited by Charles Baker in 1864, and printed for private circulation by the 8th Duke of Beaufort. A facsimile edition of the whole work, The Account of the Official Progress of His Grace Henry, the First Duke of Beaufort through Wales in 1684 was sponsored by the Cambrian Archaeological Association in 1888.

The History from Marble, a collection of epitaphs, church notes, and sketches of domestic and other buildings (published by the Camden Society 1867–1868), ranges over most of the midland and western counties in England. Dingley's notes and sketches were known to Treadway Russell Nash and Theophilus Jones, who made use of them in their histories of Worcestershire and Brecon. The manuscript passed to Sir F. S. Winnington. Dingley's collections also formed the groundwork of Richard Rawlinson's History and Antiquities of the Cathedral Church of Hereford.
