= Thomas Bentham =

Thomas Bentham (1513/14–1579) was a scholar and a Protestant minister. One of the Marian exiles, he returned to England to minister to an underground congregation in London. He was made the first Elizabethan bishop of Coventry and Lichfield, serving from 1560 until his death in 1579.

== Life ==
Bentham was born in 1513/14, to unknown parents, in Sherburn, Yorkshire (although which of the two places of this name is uncertain). He was admitted perpetual fellow of Magdalen College, Oxford, on 10 November 1546, proceeded M.A. in 1547, and "about that time did solely addict his mind to the study of theology and to the learning of the Hebrew tongue, in which last he was most excellent, as in those of Greek and Latin".

On the accession of Mary he was turned out of his fellowship "for his forward and malapert zeal against the catholic religion in the time of Edward VI, by the visitors appointed by her to regulate the university". He went to Zürich and afterwards to Basel, and became preacher to the exiles there, to whom he delivered an exposition of the Acts of the Apostles. John Foxe, another Fellow of Magdalen, includes anecdotes of Bentham in his Book of Martyrs.

He was back in England before the accession of Elizabeth I in 1558, despite the persecution of Protestants.

In 1559 Ralph Baines, the bishop of Lichfield and Coventry, who was a Roman Catholic, was imprisoned; he died the same year.

Bentham was appointed to the bishopric. He faced a number of economic challenges.

He was buried at Eccleshall, where he had his official residence.

== Notes ==
=== Attribution ===
This article incorporates text from a publication now in the public domain: Grosart, Alexander Balloch (1885). "Bentham, Thomas". In Stephen, Leslie (ed.). Dictionary of National Biography. Vol. 4. London: Smith, Elder & Co.

Church of England titles
| Preceded by Ralph Baines | Bishop of Lichfield; 1560–1579 | Succeeded by William Overton |
