= Joan Waste =

English Protestant martyr

- Born: 1534; Derby
- Died: 1 August 1556 (aged 21–22); Derby
- Cause of death: Burned to death
- Occupation: rope maker
- Known for: martyrdom
- Parent(s): William and Joan Waste

Joan Waste or Wast (1534 – 1 August 1556) was a blind woman who was burned in Derby for refusing to renounce her Protestant faith.

== Biography ==
Waste was born blind in 1534, with her twin brother Roger, to a Derby barber, William Waste and his wife, Joan. By the age of twelve she had learned to knit as well as how to make ropes (her father was also a ropemaker).

In 1553, Queen Mary I came to the throne and in January 1555 it was made illegal by Parliament to hold Protestant views. At least 284 people were condemned for heresy during Mary's reign. Some were famous, the bishops Thomas Cranmer, Hugh Latimer, and Nicholas Ridley among them, but many executed between spring 1555 and the queen's death in November 1558 were from "the lower orders".

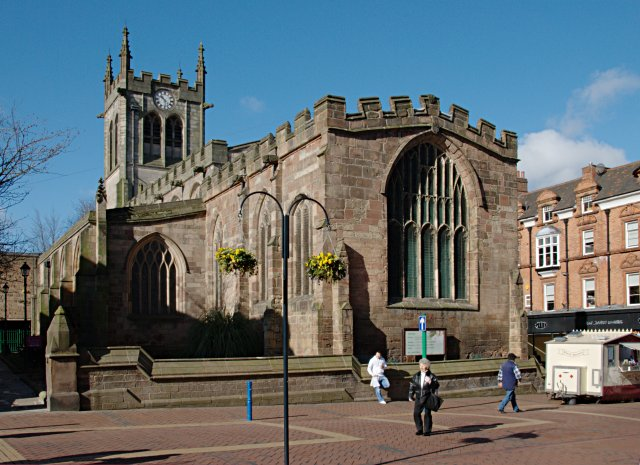
Joan and her family attended services at St Peter's in Derby where they heard the services in English until Mary became Queen.

Waste was called before the Catholic Bishop of Lichfield and Coventry, Ralph Baines' chancellor, Anthony Draycot, to defend her views; and for these she was condemned. She had objected to the services now being read in Latin. She was sentenced for buying a New Testament which she asked friends to read to her for a penny a time. She also denied the doctrine of transubstantiation and held that the bread and wine were only that.

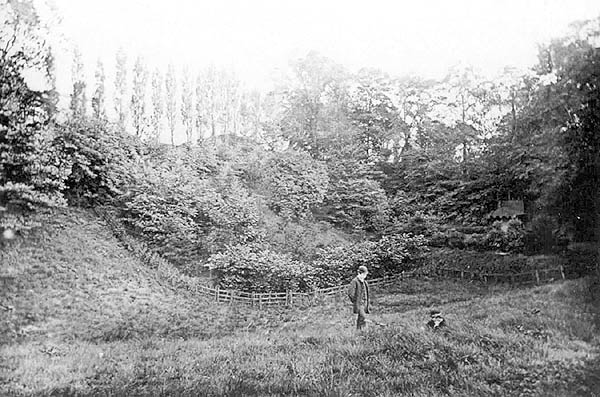
Windmill Hill Pit in the 19C (It was known as the "ordeal pit" in the eleventh century).

Her trial took place at what was then All Saints Parish Church. This building has been rebuilt, but the tower dates from 1530 and the building is now known as Derby Cathedral.

On the day of her death she was reported to have held hands with her twin brother as she walked to her pyre.

Waste was accompanied to church by Anthony Draycot who gave a final sermon, Thomas Powthread, Sir John Port, Henry Vernon and Master John Dethick of Newhall.

The public execution took place at Windmill Pit on the Burton Road in Derby. Windmill Hill Pit is on Lime Avenue which is just off Burton Road in Derby. She was hanged over the fire with a rope and she fell into the fire when the rope burned through. Waste was expected to suffer for her beliefs for eternity. Draycot it is said went home to his meal that day.

There is a memorial to her in Birchover church. The place where Waste was executed is now the site of a Roman Catholic church. Ralph Baines, the Bishop of Coventry and Lichfield was deprived of his bishopric (21 June 1559) on the accession of Elizabeth I of England and committed to the imprisonment of Edmund Grindal, the Protestant Bishop of London. Draycot was sent to be a prisoner of the Fleet and died after being released in 1571.

A blue plaque commemorating the site of Waste's execution was erected in Lime Avenue by Derby Civic Society in February 2017.
