= Ballycar Castle =

Former castle in County Clare, Ireland

Coordinates: 52°45′50.55″N 8°52′27.86″W

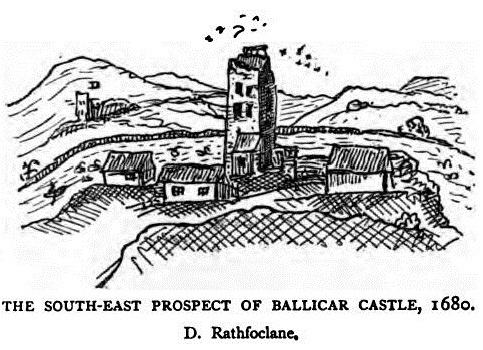
Ballicar Castle by Thomas Dineley

Ballycar Castle stood in the parish of Newmarket-on-Fergus, near the road between Limerick and Galway, 3 miles (5 km) from Sixmilebridge, 9 miles (14 km) from Limerick, and 7 miles (11 km) from Ennis it was said to have been built before 1570 and was a ruin before 1681 when it was sketched by Thomas Dineley.

Ballycar Castle was said to have been built by Connor McHugh-McLoghlin-McNamara, but does not appear among the list of castles in 1570. In 1580 it belonged to Donogh O’Brien. The Castle, and two plowlands, of Ballycarhy were passed in the Earl of Thomond's patent of 1620. In 1655, a lease of Ballycar Castle, &c., "as heretofore held by George Colpoys, deceased", was made by the Earl of Thomond to John Colpoys, with the condition to supply an armed Protestant horseman, provided for a month. This lease was converted in 1714 into a fee farm grant, and by the 1890s had passed to heirs female.

The castle was a ruin when it was sketched by Thomas Dineley in 1680 and had disappeared by the 1890s. The house that had been built on the site (and which had last been occupied by a magistrate), was by then a roofless ruin.
