= Ralph Baines =

Bishop of Coventry and Lichfield from 1554 to 1559

The Right Reverend Ralph Baines
- Bishop of Lichfield
- Church: Roman Catholic
- Diocese: Lichfield
- Appointed: 10 November 1554
- Term ended: 24 Jun 1559
- Predecessor: Richard Sampson
- Successor: Thomas Bentham

Orders
- Consecration: 18 November 1554 by Edmund Bonner

Personal details
- Born: c. 1504 Knowsthorpe, Yorkshire, England
- Died: 18 November 1559

Ralph Baines or "Bayne" (c. 1504 – 18 November 1559) was the last Roman Catholic Bishop of Lichfield and Coventry, in England.

== Early life ==
Baines was born around 1504 at Knowsthorpe in Yorkshire. Educated at St. John's College, Cambridge, he was ordained priest at Ely in 1519. He came out against Hugh Latimer, and opposed Henry VIII's divorce from Catherine of Aragon, being incited to the latter by John Fisher.

He was rector of Hardwick, Cambridgeshire, until 1544; but he had left the country by 1538.

== Hebraist ==
Baines was a Hebraist, being a college lecturer in Hebrew at St John's. He went to Paris and became professor of Hebrew at the Collège de France from 1549 to 1554.

He was the author of the work Compendium Michlol (also with the Hebrew title, Ḳiẓẓur ha-Ḥeleḳ Rishon ha-Miklol), containing a Latin abstract of the first part of David Ḳimḥi's Hebrew grammar, and dealing methodically with the letters, reading, nouns, regular and irregular verbs, prefixes and suffixes (Paris, 1554).

== Bishop ==
In 1554, Baines returned to England and was consecrated as Bishop of Lichfield and Coventry, on 18 November 1554.

He vigorously opposed the Protestant Reformers, and features largely in Foxe's Book of Martyrs, conducting many examinations with his Chancellor, Anthony Draycot. His chancellor was involved, for instance, in the burning of a young blind woman, Joan Waste, for heresy in Derby. He was one of the eight defenders of Catholic doctrine at the Westminster Conference of 1558/9.

On the accession of Elizabeth I of England, he was deprived of his bishopric (21 June 1559) and committed to the care of Edmund Grindal, the Protestant Bishop of London, becoming one of eleven imprisoned bishops (researches of G. Philips support a theory that, though nominally a guest, Baines was in fact a strict prisoner). His captivity lasted until 18 November 1559, when, in the words of fellow Roman Catholic John Pitts, Baines "died an illustrious Confessor of the Lord".

== Works ==
- Prima Rudimenta in linguam Hebraicam (Paris, 1550)
- Compendium Michol, hoc est absolutissimæ grammatices Davidis Chimhi (Paris, 1554)
- In Proverbia Salomonis (Paris, 1555).

== Notes ==
Catholic Church titles
Preceded by Richard Sampson	Bishop of Lichfield; 1554–1559	Succeeded by Thomas Bentham
