= Geoffrey Blythe =

15th-century Bishop of Coventry and Lichfield

- Bishop of Coventry and Lichfield
- In office: 1503 – c. 1530
- Predecessor: John Arundel
- Successor: Rowland Lee

Personal details
- Born: Norton, Derbyshire
- Died: c. 1530
- Denomination: Catholic
- Parents: William Blythe & wife (née Rotherham)

Geoffrey Blythe (died c. 1530) was the Bishop of Coventry and Lichfield.

== Biography ==
Blythe was born at Norton in Derbyshire (now part of Sheffield) to William Blythe and a sister of Thomas Rotherham, Archbishop of York. He was schooled at Eton and then entered King's College, Cambridge in 1483. He was ordained a priest on 4 April 1496. King Henry VII entertained a high opinion of his abilities, and often employed him in foreign embassies. He was special ambassador on 27 May 1502 to Vladislas II, King of Hungary and Bohemia, and on his return was rewarded with the bishopric of Coventry and Lichfield. From 1512 to 1524 he was appointed president of the Council of Wales and the Marches.

Blythe's elder brother John was Bishop of Salisbury, and Bishops' House in Sheffield is said to be so named because it was built for the brothers, though there is no evidence that they ever lived there.

Catholic Church titles
Preceded by John Arundel	Bishop of Coventry and Lichfield; 1503–1530	Succeeded by Rowland Lee
