= Rowland Lee (bishop) =

English clergyman

Bishop Rowland Lee (or Leigh; c. 1487 – 28 January 1543) was an English clergyman who served as Bishop of Coventry and Lichfield 1534–43 and also as Lord President of the Marches under King Henry VIII.

== Life ==
His family hailed from Isell, Cumberland, and he was educated at Cambridge. After being ordained as a priest Leigh obtained several livings under the patronage of Cardinal Wolsey; despite Wolsey's fall he rose high in the esteem of Henry VIII and of Thomas Cromwell by pursuing the policy of suppressing the monasteries, and is believed to have been rewarded by officiating at Henry's secret marriage to Anne Boleyn in January 1533. Whether so or not, Bishop Leigh took a lead part in preparing for the divorce proceedings against Catherine of Aragon, before in January 1534 being elected as Bishop of Coventry and Lichfield (the last to hold that title), or Chester, as the see was otherwise known, pledging at his consecration the new oath to the King as sovereign head of the Church of England rather than to the Pope; he was consecrated a bishop on 19 April 1534, by Thomas Cranmer, Archbishop of Canterbury, assisted by John Longland, Bishop of Lincoln; and Christopher Lord, suffragan bishop of Canterbury and Bishop of Sidon. He served as a prelate to the royal household advocating the legality of Henry's marriage with Queen Anne until May 1534 when he was appointed Lord President of the Council of Wales and the Marches.

As the Lord President, under the direction of Thomas Cromwell, he set out to bring law and order to the Welsh regions. What ensued was a reign of terror, in which Leigh decided the best way to deal with the "lawless" Welsh was to convict and hang with impunity. It is claimed that Bishop Leigh hanged 5,000 Welshmen in his five years; probably an exaggeration, but in any event indicates the character of the man described as a "great despiser of Welshmen" by Dafydd Jenkins.

Leigh was also disliked among the gentry for giving them scant respect, despite being related to them; he once boasted to have hanged "Five of the best blood in the county of Shropshire".

The "Hanging Bishop" was said to have been disappointed and incensed when the first Act of Union was enacted in 1536, as he believed the Welsh could not be trusted as part of England. Leigh died at Shrewsbury, and was buried there in old St Chad's Church.

== See also ==
- List of the Bishops of the Diocese of Lichfield and its precursor offices

Church of England titles
Preceded by Geoffrey Blyth	Bishop of Lichfield; 1534–1543	Succeeded by Richard Sampson
