= Anthony Draycot =

English Roman Catholic churchman and lawyer

Anthony Draycot (died 1571 in Draycott in the Moors) was an English Roman Catholic churchman and lawyer. During the reign of Queen Mary he held a diocesan position as chancellor; his role in condemning numerous Protestants to death is detailed in Foxe's Book of Martyrs.

== Life ==
He was from Staffordshire, and became principal of White Hall (afterwards included in Jesus College), Oxford, and of Pirye Hall adjoining it. On 23 June 1522 he was admitted bachelor of canons, taking his doctor's degree on 21 July following. He held the family rectum of Draycot. On 11 December 1527 he was instituted to the vicarage of Hitchin, Hertfordshire, which he exchanged on 5 March 1531 for the rectory of Cottingham, Northamptonshire. He was archdeacon of Stow, 15 January 1543, and archdeacon of Huntingdon, 27 July 1543, both in the same diocese of Lincoln. On 2 December 1547 he was appointed by convocation head of a committee to draw up a form of a statute for paying tithes in cities. Draycot held a number of positions as rector of St Mary's Church, Wirksworth, North Wingfield, Kettering, and Grindon.

He was chancellor for a time to John Longland, bishop of Lincoln, and to Ralph Baine, bishop of Coventry and Lichfield, acting against the Protestants. It is said that after giving a sermon on the day of Joan Waste's execution he then went home to eat. In 1553 he was one of the committee for the restitution of Bishop Edmund Bonner. At Elizabeth's accession he refused to take the oath of supremacy, and was stripped of all his preferments, except the rectory of Draycot. In 1560 he was in the Fleet Prison. He was allowed out to die at his family's home in Draycott in the Moors, on 20 January 1571.
