= Richard Sampson =

English diplomat and bishop; composer

Richard Sampson (died 25 September 1554) was an English clergyman and composer of sacred music. He was an Anglican bishop of Chichester, and subsequently of Coventry and Lichfield.

== Biography ==
He was educated at Trinity Hall, Cambridge, the Paris Sorbonne and Sens (also in France). Having become Doctor of Canon Law, he was appointed by Cardinal Wolsey as diocesan chancellor and vicar-general in his diocese (the bishopric of Tournai), where he lived until 1517. Meanwhile, he gained English preferment, becoming Archdeacon of Cornwall (1517) and prebendary of Newbald (1519). From 1522 to 1525 he was English ambassador to Emperor Charles V. He was Dean of St. Stephen's, Westminster in 1520 and was (in addition) made Dean of the Chapel Royal and Dean of Windsor (both in 1523); meanwhile, he had been appointed Canon and Sacrist at St. Paul's Cathedral in 1522. Continuing to hold these offices, he was made Vicar of Stepney in 1526 (which he later resigned on being appointed Rector of Hackney). He was also Archdeacon of Suffolk (1529) and held prebends at St. Paul's Cathedral and at Lichfield.

He became one of Henry VIII Tudor's chief agents in the royal divorce proceedings, which assisted the advancement of his ecclesiastical career—he was awarded the deanery of Lichfield in 1533, the rectory of Hackney (1534), and treasurership of Salisbury (1535) and the deanery of St Paul's (1536). On 11 June 1536, he was elected Bishop of Chichester; he resigned his archdeaconry and the deanery of Windsor, but continued as Dean of St Paul's in commendam; he also continued in the office of Dean of the Chapel Royal until 1540 (when he was briefly imprisoned, having sent alms to Thomas Abell).

As bishop, Sampson furthered Henry's political and—from the Catholic point of view schismatical—ecclesiastical policy, though not sufficiently thoroughly to satisfy archbishop Thomas Cranmer. He was one of the so-called moderate Catholic bishops, who would accede to the Royal Supremacy as long as Protestant teachings did not compromise the liturgy and sacraments. In 1540 he may have been sent to the tower for being too Catholic.

On 19 February 1543, he was translated to the bishopric of Coventry and Lichfield on the royal authority alone, without papal confirmation. He held his bishopric through the reign of Edward VI, though Dodd says he was deprived for recanting his disloyalty to the pope. Godwin the Anglican writer and the Catholic John Pitts both agree that he did so retract, but are silent as to his deprivation. He wrote an "Oratio" in defence of the royal prerogative (1533) and an explanation of the Psalms (1539–48) and of the Pauline Epistle to the Romans (1546).

He died at Eccleshall in Staffordshire.

Church of England titles
Preceded by Robert Sherborne	Bishop of Chichester; 1536–1543	Succeeded by George Day
Preceded by Rowland Lee	Bishop of Lichfield; 1543–1554	Succeeded by Ralph Baines
