= Thomas Bedyll =

Thomas Bedyll (or Bedell)(died 1537) was a divine and royal servant. He was royal chaplain and clerk of the Privy Council of Henry VIII, assisting him with the separation from Rome.

== Biography ==
=== Ecclesiastical career ===
He was educated at New College, Oxford, and took the degree of B.C.L. on 5 November 1508. He was a canon of Lincoln cathedral in 1518, rector of Bocking, Essex in 1522 and of St. Dionis Backchurch in 1528. He was collated Archdeacon of Cleveland from June to August 1533, Archdeacon of London in 1533-4 and Archdeacon of Cornwall in 1536. He was canon of St. Paul's cathedral in 1534, of York cathedral in 1536, of Wells cathedral and of Chichester cathedral in 1534 and rector of All Hallows, Barking in 1534.

=== Political career ===
In 1520 he was acting as secretary to William Warham, Archbishop of Canterbury, serving in that capacity until the archbishop's death in August 1532. Within a month the king Henry VIII took him into his service as one of the royal chaplains, and on 14 October he signs a letter to the king as clerk of the council, a post to which he had recently been appointed. He soon was high in the favour of Thomas Cromwell and Thomas Cranmer, whose views on ecclesiastical policy he adopted.

His first public employments were in connection with Henry's divorce from Catharine of Aragon. After being sent to Oxford to obtain opinions from the university in the king's favour, he accompanied Cranmer to Dunstable as one of the counsel on the king's side, when the archbishop pronounced the final sentence of nullity of marriage. Several letters from him are extant recording the course of the trial and the pronunciation of the sentence, in the drawing up of which he had some share.

In the next two years (1534 and 1535) he was engaged in obtaining the oaths of the inmates of several religious houses to the royal supremacy; in conducting as one of the king's council the examination of Bishop John Fisher and of Sir Thomas More, when tried for treason for refusing the oath; and in assessing the values of ecclesiastical benefices in England. When the smaller monasteries were suppressed by act of parliament in 1536, Bedyll visited many of them in the neighbourhood of London to obtain the surrenders of the houses; and about the same time presided over a commission appointed to examine papal bulls and briefs conferring privileges on churches and dignities in England, with a view to their confirmation or abolition. The "book" that was circulated throughout England as a basis for sermons on the futility of the pope's claims to authority in England, was revised and corrected by him.

== Death ==
He died in the beginning of September 1537, his death being mentioned in a letter from Richard Cromwell to his uncle Thomas on 5 September.
