= January =

1st month in the Julian and Gregorian calendars

<<	January					>>
Su	Mo	Tu	We	Th	Fr	Sa
				1	2	3
4	5	6	7	8	9	10
11	12	13	14	15	16	17
18	19	20	21	22	23	24
25	26	27	28	29	30	31
2026

January is the first month of the year in the Julian and Gregorian calendars. Its length is 31 days. The first day of the month is known as New Year's Day. It is, on average, the coldest month of the year within most of the Northern Hemisphere (where it is the second month of winter) and the warmest month of the year within most of the Southern Hemisphere (where it is the second month of summer). In the Southern hemisphere, January is the seasonal equivalent of July in the Northern hemisphere and vice versa.

Ancient Roman observances during this month include Cervula and Juvenalia, celebrated January 1, as well as one of three Agonalia, celebrated January 9, and Carmentalia, celebrated January 11. These dates do not correspond to the modern Gregorian calendar.

== History ==
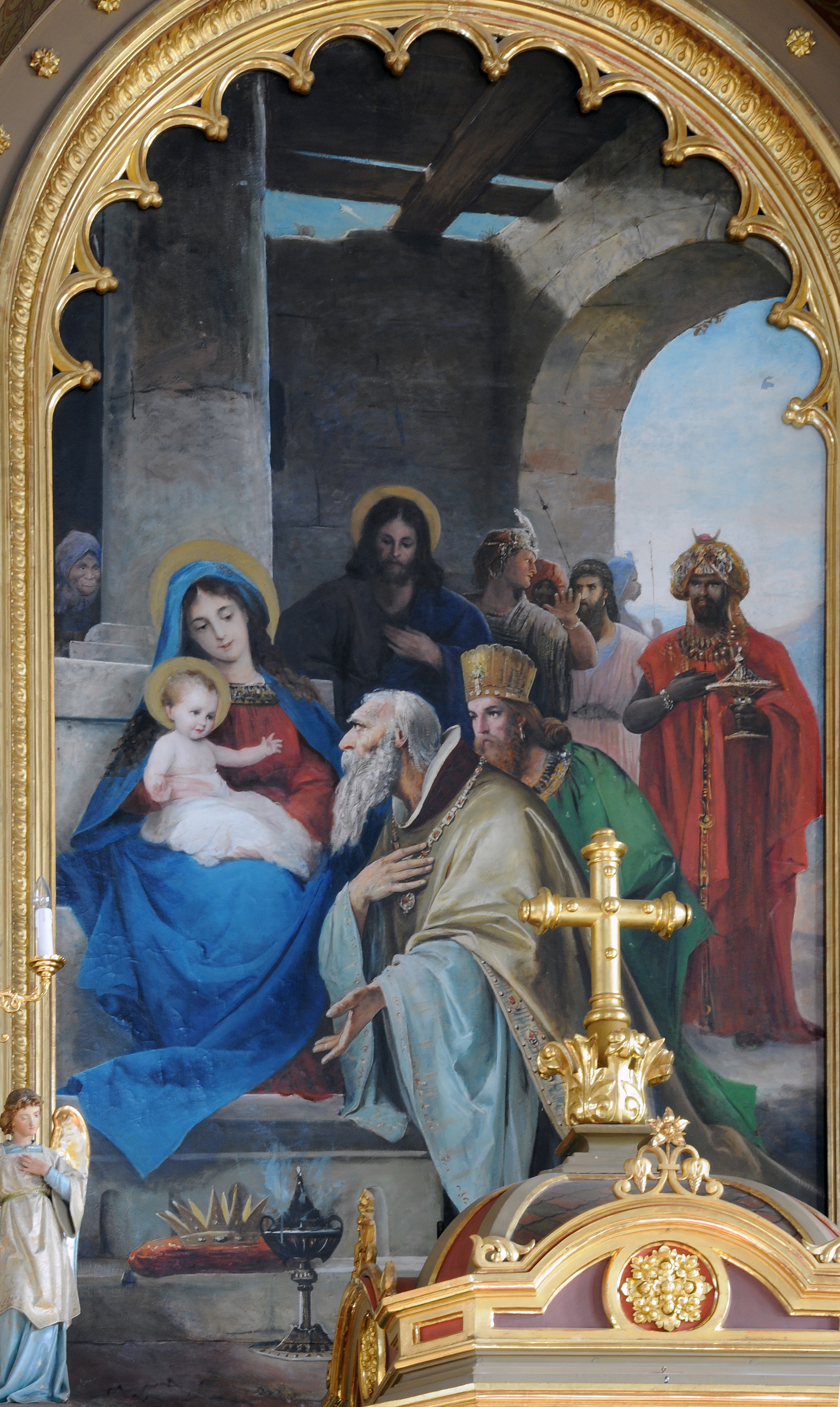
Adoration of the Magi, Epiphany, January 6

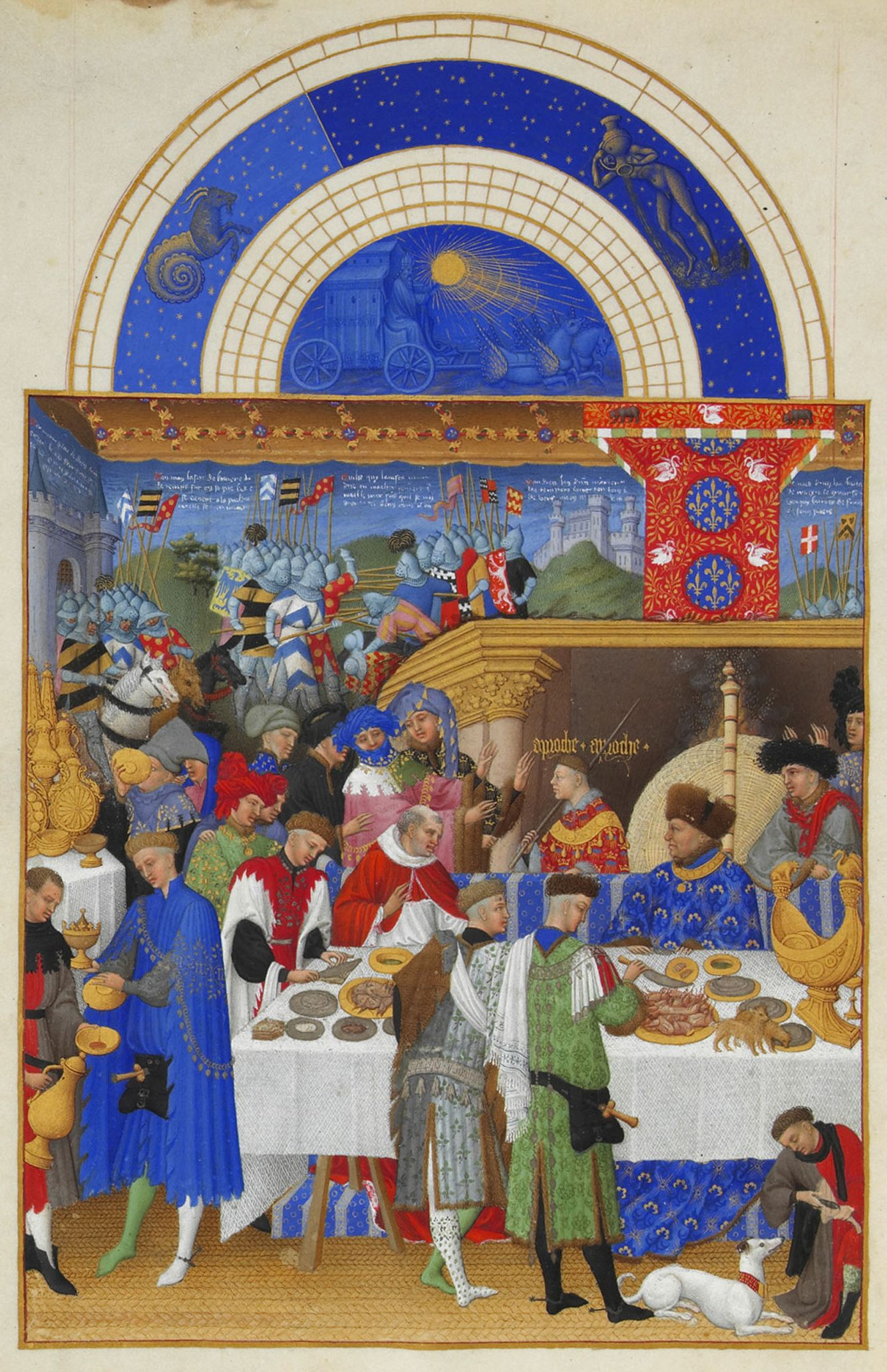
January, from the Très Riches Heures du Duc de Berry

In recent decades, the number of warm temperature records in January has outpaced cold records over a growing portion of Earth's surface.

Chart shows changes in global average temperature annually in January of each year

January (in Latin, Ianuarius) is named after Janus, the god of beginnings and transitions in ancient Roman religion and mythology.

Traditionally, the original Roman calendar consisted of 10 months totaling 304 days, winter being considered a month-less period. Around 713 BC, the semi-mythical successor of Romulus, King Numa Pompilius, is supposed to have added the months of January and February, so that the calendar covered a standard lunar year (354 days). Although March was originally the first month in the old Roman calendar, January became the first month of the calendar year either under Numa or under the Decemvirs about 450 BC (Roman writers differ). By contrast, each specific calendar year was identified by the names of the two consuls, who entered office on March 15th until 153 BC, at which point they started entering office on January 1st.

Various Christian feast dates were used for the New Year in Europe during the Middle Ages, including March 25 (Feast of the Annunciation) and December 25. However, medieval calendars were still displayed in the Roman fashion with twelve columns from January to December. Beginning in the 16th century, European countries began officially making January 1 the start of the New Year once again—sometimes called Circumcision Style because this was the date of the Feast of the Circumcision, being the seventh day after December 25.

Historical names for January include its original Roman designation, Ianuarius, the Saxon term Wulf-monath (meaning "wolf month") and Charlemagne's designation Wintarmanoth ("winter / cold month"). In Slovene, it is traditionally called prosinec; the name, associated with millet bread and the act of asking for something, was first written in 1466 in the Škofja Loka manuscript.

According to Theodor Mommsen, 1 January became the first day of the year in 600 AUC of the Roman calendar (153 BC), due to disasters in the Lusitanian War. A Lusitanian chief called Punicus invaded the Roman territory, defeated two Roman governors, and killed their troops. The Romans resolved to send a consul to Hispania, and in order to accelerate the dispatch of aid, "they even made the new consuls enter into office two months and a half before the legal time" (March 15).

== Symbols ==
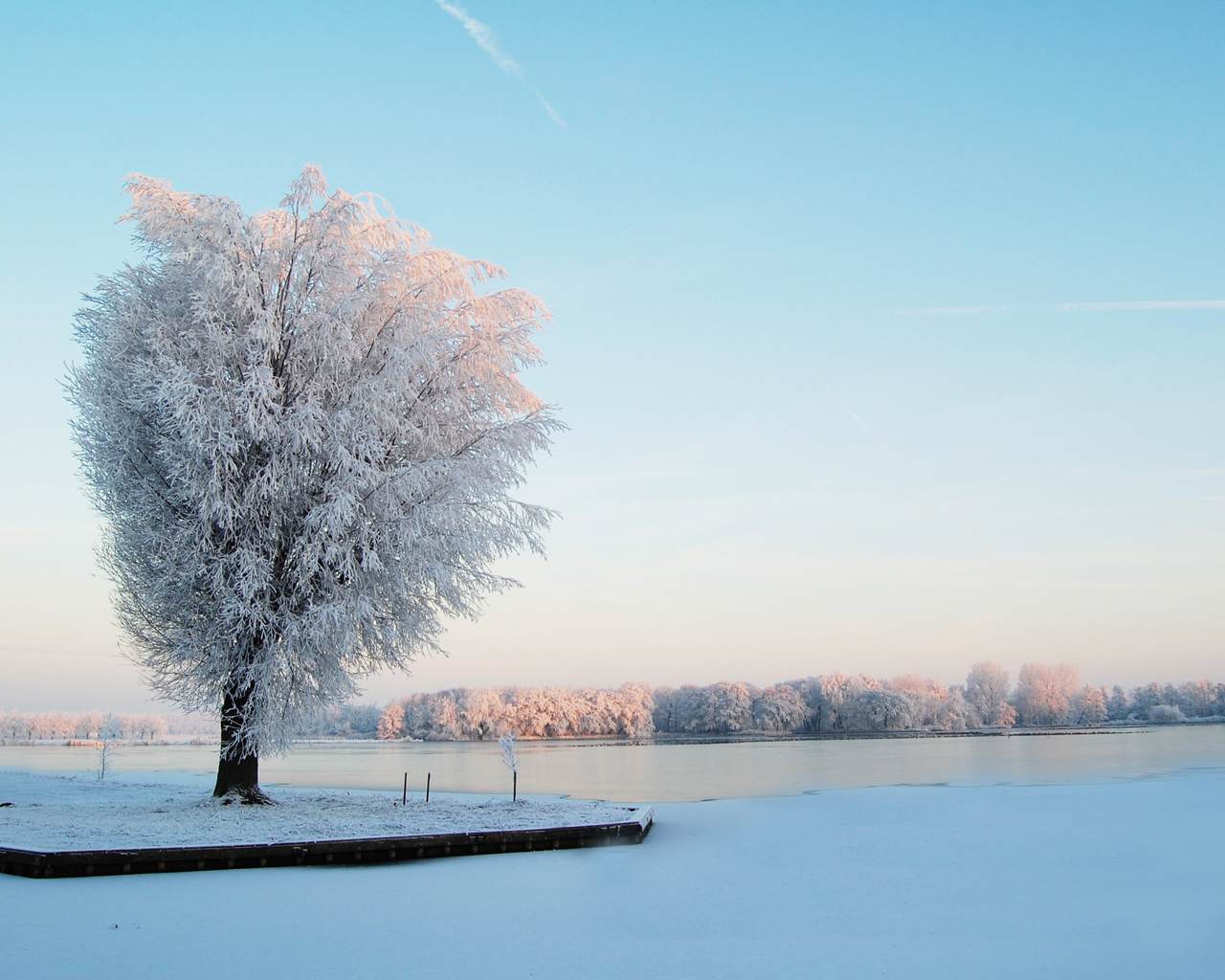
Snow in the Northern Hemisphere in the month of January

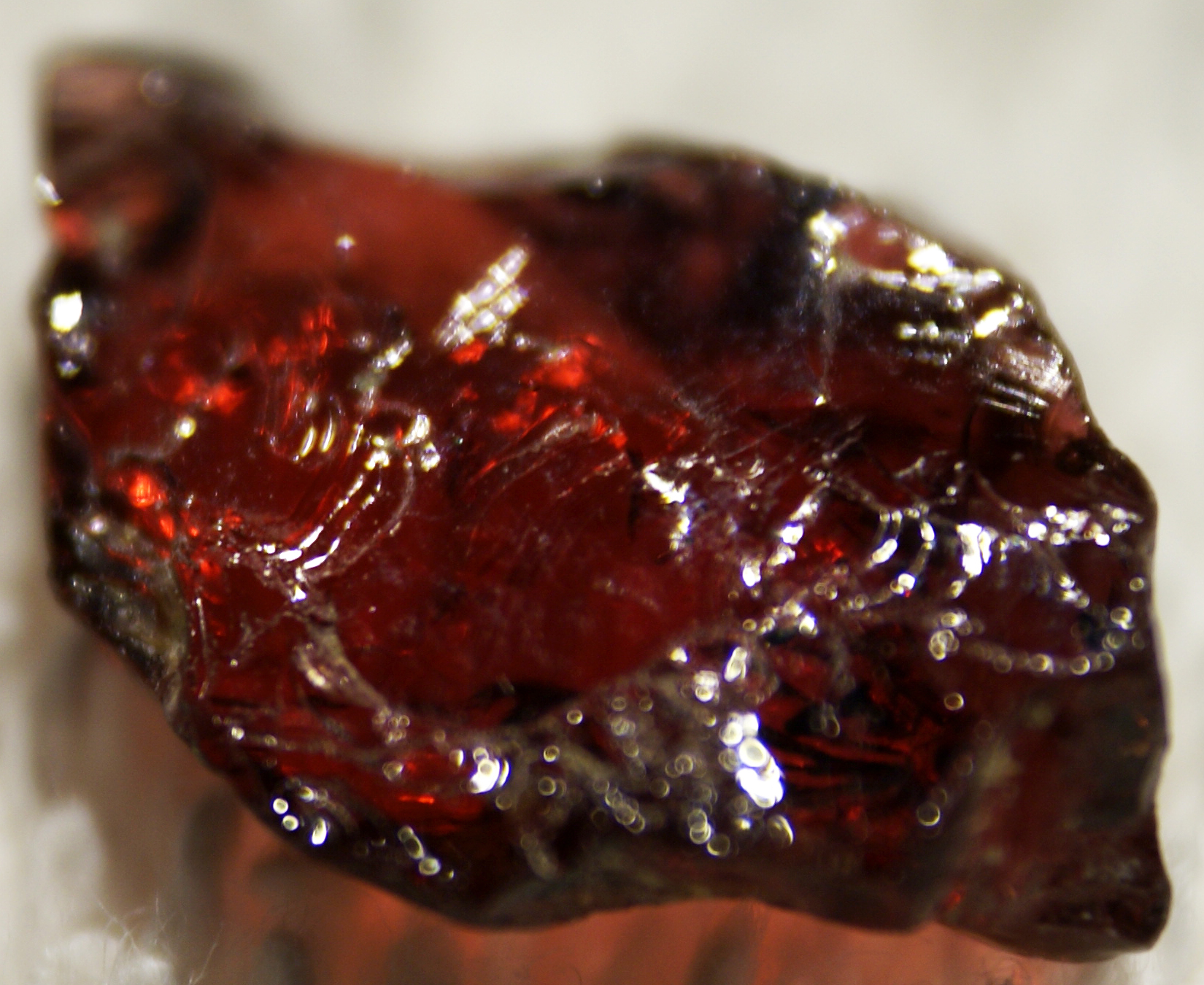
Garnet gemstone

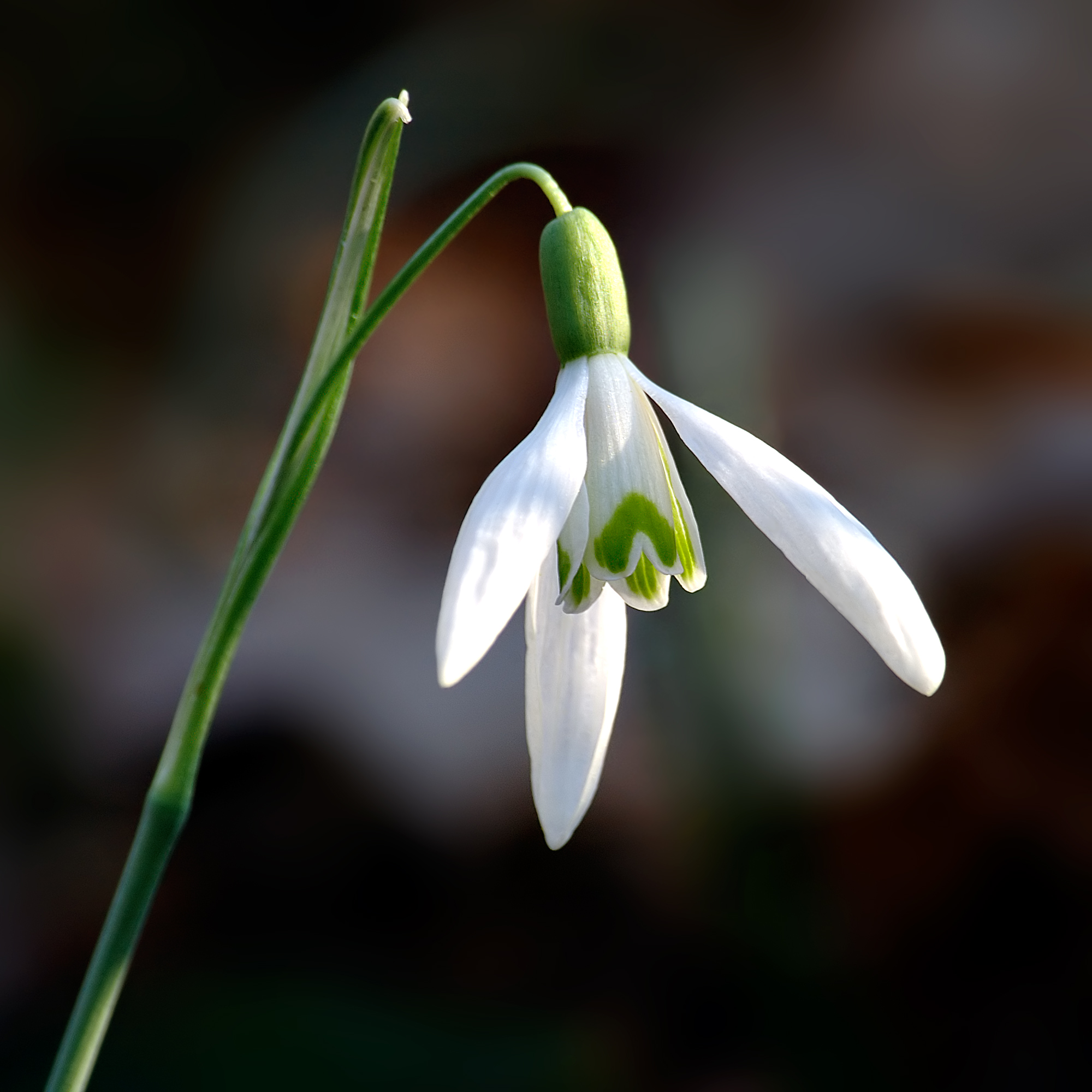
Snowdrop (Galanthus) flower

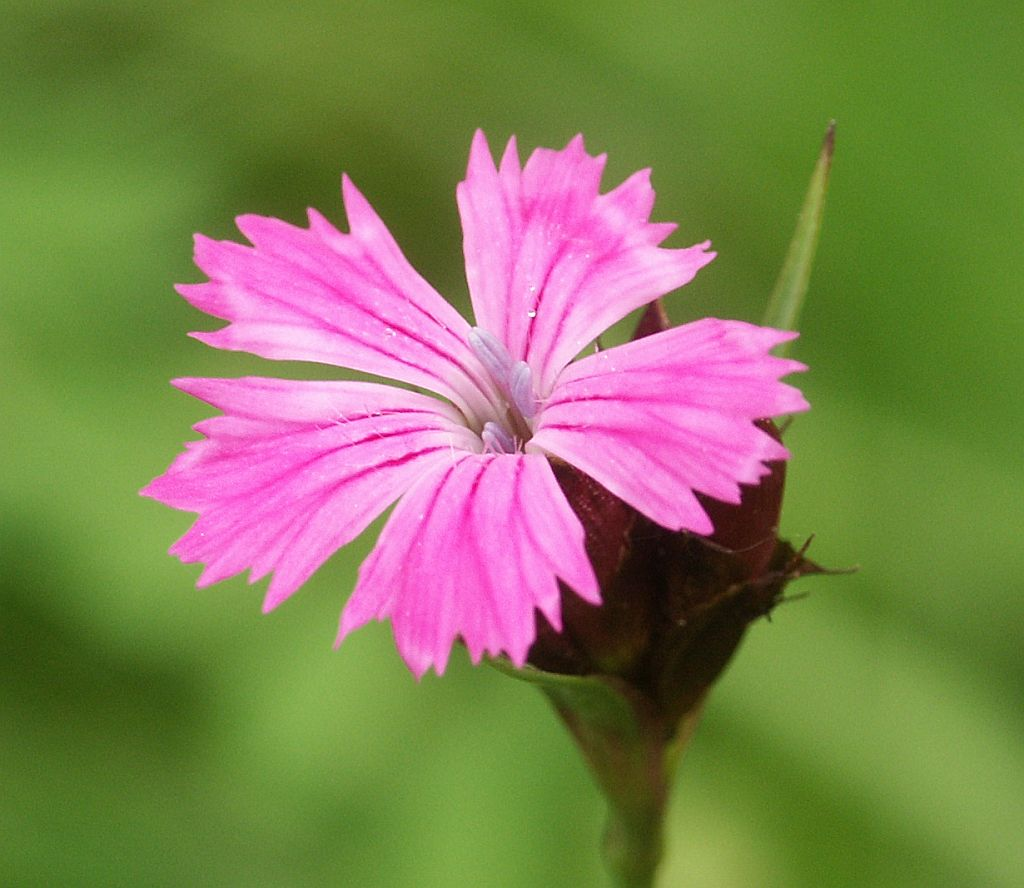
Pink dianthus

January's birthstone is the garnet, which represents constancy. Its birth flower is the cottage pink Dianthus caryophyllus, galanthus or traditional carnation. The zodiac signs are Capricorn (until January 19) and Aquarius (January 20 onwards).

== Observances ==
This list does not necessarily imply either official status or general observance.

=== Month-long ===
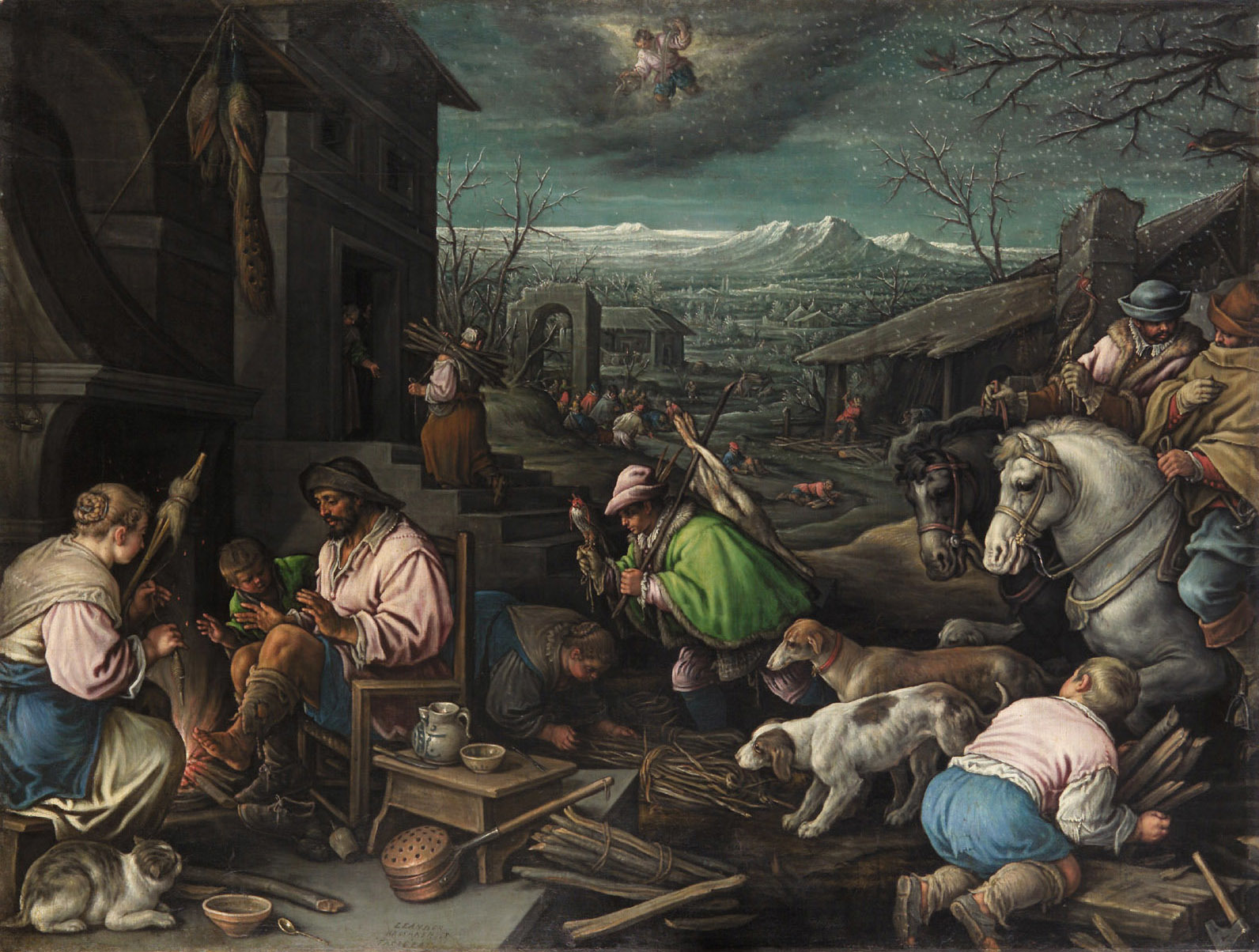
January, painting by Leandro Bassano

- Alzheimer's Awareness Month (Canada)
- Dry January (United Kingdom)
- National Codependency Awareness Month (United States)
- National Mentoring Month (United States)
- National Healthy Weight Awareness Month (United States)
- Slavery and Human Trafficking Prevention Month (United States)
- Stalking Awareness Month (United States)
- Veganuary

=== Food months in the United States ===
This list does not necessarily imply either official status or general observance.

- Be Kind to Food Servers Month (by proclamation, State of Tennessee)
- California Dried Plum Digestive Health Month
- Hot Tea Month
- National Soup Month
- Oatmeal Month

=== Non-Gregorian ===
All Baha'i, Islamic, and Jewish observances begin at sundown prior to the date listed, and end at sundown on the date in question.

- List of observances set by the Bahá'í calendar
- List of observances set by the Chinese calendar
- List of observances set by the Hebrew calendar
- List of observances set by the Islamic calendar
- List of observances set by the Solar Hijri calendar

=== Moveable ===
This list does not necessarily imply either official status or general observance.

- See: List of movable Western Christian observances
- See: List of movable Eastern Christian observances

January 2 unless that day is a Sunday, in which case January 3

- New Year Holiday (Scotland)

First Friday

- Children's Day (Bahamas)

Second Saturday

- Children's Day (Thailand)

Second Monday

- Birthday of Eugenio María de Hostos (Puerto Rico, United States)
- Coming of Age Day (Japan)

Friday before third Monday

- Lee–Jackson Day (Virginia, United States, defunct)

Third Friday

- International Fetish Day

Sunday closest to January 22

- National Sanctity of Human Life Day (United States)

Third full week of January

- Hunt for Happiness Week (International observance)
- National Non-Smoking Week (Canada)

Last full week of January

- National School Choice Week (United States)

Third Monday

- Martin Luther King, Jr. Day (United States)
  - Idaho Human Rights Day (Idaho, United States)

Wednesday of the third full week of January

- Weedless Wednesday (Canada)

Friday between January 19–25

- Husband's Day (Iceland)

Last Saturday

- National Seed Swap Day (United States)

Last Sunday

- Liberation of Auschwitz Memorial Day (Netherlands)
- World Leprosy Day

Last Monday in January

- Bubble Wrap Appreciation Day

Fourth Monday

- Community Manager Appreciation Day (International observance)
- National Heroes' Day (Cayman Islands)

Monday Closest to January 29

- Auckland Anniversary Day

=== Fixed ===
- December 25 – January 5: Twelve Days of Christmas (Western Christianity)
- December 26 – January 1: Kwanzaa (African Americans)
- December 31 – January 1, in some cases until January 2: Hogmanay (Scotland)
- January 1
  - Feast of the Circumcision of Christ
    - Feast of the Holy Name of Jesus (Anglican Communion, Lutheran Church)
    - Feast of Fools (Medieval Europe)
  - Constitution Day (Italy)
  - Dissolution of Czechoslovakia-related observances:
    - Day of the Establishment of the Slovak Republic (Slovakia)
    - Restoration Day of the Independent Czech State (Czech Republic)
  - Euro Day (European Union)
  - Flag Day (Lithuania)
  - Founding Day (Taiwan)
  - Global Family Day
  - Independence Day (Brunei, Cameroon, Haiti, Sudan)
  - International Nepali Dhoti and Nepali Topi Day
  - Jump-up Day (Montserrat, British Overseas Territories)
  - Kalpataru Day (Ramakrishna Movement)
  - National Bloody Mary Day (United States)
  - National Tree Planting Day (Tanzania)
  - New Year's Day
    - Japanese New Year
    - Novy God Day (Russia)
    - Sjoogwachi (Okinawa Islands)
  - Polar Bear Swim Day (Canada and United States)
  - Public Domain Day (multiple countries)
  - Solemnity of Mary, Mother of God (Catholic Church)
    - World Day of Peace
  - Triumph of the Revolution (Cuba)
- January 2
  - Ancestry Day (Haiti)
  - Berchtold's Day (Liechtenstein, Switzerland, and the Alsace)
  - Carnival Day (Saint Kitts and Nevis)
  - Kakizome (Japan)
  - National Creampuff Day (United States)
  - National Science Fiction Day (United States)
  - The second day of New Year (a holiday in Armenia, Kazakhstan, North Macedonia, Mauritius, Montenegro, New Zealand, Romania, Russia, Switzerland, and Ukraine)
  - Nyinlong (Bhutan)
  - Victory of Armed Forces Day (Cuba)
- January 3
  - Anniversary of the 1966 Coup d'état (Burkina Faso)
  - Nakhatsenendyan toner (Armenia): January 3–5
  - Ministry of Religious Affairs Day (Indonesia)
  - National Chocolate Covered Cherry Day (United States)
  - Tamaseseri Festival (Hakozaki Shrine, Fukuoka, Japan)
- January 4
  - Day of the Fallen against the Colonial Repression (Angola)
  - Day of the Martyrs (Democratic Republic of the Congo)
  - Hwinukan mukee (Okinawa Islands, Japan)
  - Independence Day (Myanmar)
  - Ogoni Day (Movement for the Survival of the Ogoni People)
  - World Braille Day
- January 5
  - National Bird Day (United States)
  - National Whipped Cream Day (United States)
  - Strawberry day (Japan)
  - Take Our Daughters and Sons to Work Day (Sydney, Melbourne, and Brisbane, Australia)
  - Tucindan (Serbia, Montenegro)
- January 6
  - Armed Forces Day (Iraq)
  - Epiphany or Three Kings' Day (Western Christianity) or Theophany (Eastern Christianity), and its related observances:
    - Befana Day (Italy)
    - Christmas (Armenian Apostolic Church)
    - Christmas Eve (Russia)
    - Christmas Eve (Ukraine)
    - Christmas Eve (Bosnia and Herzegovina)
    - Christmas Eve (North Macedonia)
    - Little Christmas (Ireland)
    - Þrettándinn (Iceland)
    - Three Wise Men Day
  - Pathet Lao Day (Laos)
- January 7
  - Christmas (Eastern Orthodox Churches and Oriental Orthodox Churches using the Julian Calendar, Rastafari)
    - Christmas in Russia
    - Christmas in Ukraine
    - Christmas (Bosnia and Herzegovina)
    - Remembrance Day of the Dead (Armenia)
  - Distaff Day (Medieval Europe)
  - Nanakusa no sekku (Japan)
  - Pioneer's Day (Liberia)
  - Tricolour day (Italy)
  - Victory from Genocide Day (Cambodia)
- January 8
  - The Eighth (United States) (defunct observance)
  - Typing Day (international observance)
- January 9
  - Start of Hōonkō (Nishi Honganji) January 9–16 (Jōdo Shinshū Buddhism)
  - Martyrs' Day (Panama)
  - Non-Resident Indian Day (India)
  - Republic Day (Republika Srpska) (defunct, declared unconstitutional by the Constitutional Court of Bosnia and Herzegovina)
  - Saint Stephen's Day (Eastern Orthodox)
- January 10
  - Fête du Vodoun (Benin)
  - Majority Rule Day (Bahamas)
- January 11
  - Children's Day (Tunisia)
  - Eugenio María de Hostos Day (Puerto Rico)
  - German Apples Day (Germany)
  - Independence Manifesto Day (Morocco)
  - Kagami biraki (Japan)
  - National Human Trafficking Awareness Day (United States)
  - Republic Day (Albania)
- January 12
  - Memorial Day (Turkmenistan)
  - Prosecutor General's Day (Russia)
  - National Youth Day (India)
  - Zanzibar Revolution Day (Tanzania)
- January 13
  - Constitution Day (Mongolia)
  - Democracy Day (Cape Verde)
  - Liberation Day (Togo)
  - Old New Year's Eve (Russia, Belarus, Ukraine, Serbia, Montenegro, Republic of Srpska, North Macedonia), and its related observances:
    - Malanka (Ukraine, Russia, Belarus)
  - St. Knut's Day (Sweden and Finland)
  - Stephen Foster Memorial Day (United States)
- January 14
  - Azhyrnykhua (Abkhazia)
  - Day of Defenders of the Motherland (Uzbekistan)
  - Feast of Divina Pastora (Barquisimeto)
  - Feast of the Ass (Medieval Christianity)
  - Flag Day (Georgia)
  - National Forest Conservation Day (Thailand)
  - Ratification Day (United States)
  - Revolution and Youth Day (Tunisia)
  - Yennayer (Berbers)
- January 15
  - Arbor Day (Egypt)
  - Armed Forces Day (Nigeria)
  - Indian Army Day (India)
  - John Chilembwe Day (Malawi)
  - Korean Alphabet Day (North Korea)
  - Sagichō at Tsurugaoka Hachimangū (Kamakura, Japan)
  - Teacher's Day (Venezuela)
  - Wikipedia Day (international observance)
- January 16
  - National Nothing Day
  - National Religious Freedom Day (United States)
  - Solemnity of Mary, Mother of God (Coptic Church)
  - Teacher's Day (Myanmar)
  - Teachers' Day (Thailand)
  - Zuuruku Nichi (Okinawa Islands, Japan)
  - Thiruvalluvar Day (Tamil Nadu, India)
- January 17
  - Hardware Freedom Day (international observance)
  - National Day (Menorca)
  - The opening ceremony of Patras Carnival, celebrated until Clean Monday (Patras)
- January 18
  - Revolution and Youth Day (Tunisia)
  - Royal Thai Armed Forces Day (Thailand)
  - Week of Prayer for Christian Unity (January 18–25) (Christianity)
- January 19
  - Confederate Heroes Day (Texas), and its related observance:
    - Robert E. Lee Day (Alabama, Florida, Georgia and Mississippi)
    - Lee–Jackson–King Day (Virginia, United States, defunct)
  - Husband's Day (Iceland)
  - Kokborok Day (Tripura, India)
  - National Popcorn Day (United States)
  - Theophany / Epiphany (Eastern and Oriental Orthodoxy), and its related observances:
    - Timkat, (on 20th during Leap Year) (Ethiopian Orthodox)
    - Vodici or Baptism of Jesus (North Macedonia)
- January 20
  - Armed Forces Day (Mali)
  - Cheese Day (United States)
  - Heroes' Day (Cape Verde)
  - Inauguration Day, held every four years in odd-numbered years, except when January 20 falls on a Sunday (United States)
  - Martyrs' Day (Azerbaijan)
- January 21
  - Babinden (Bulgaria, Serbia)
  - Birthday of Princess Ingrid Alexandra (Norway)
  - Errol Barrow Day (Barbados)
  - Flag Day (Quebec)
  - Grandmother's Day (Poland)
  - Lady of Altagracia Day (Dominican Republic)
  - Lincoln Alexander Day (Canada)
  - National Hug Day (United States)
- January 22
  - Day of Unity of Ukraine (Ukraine)
  - Grandfather's Day (Poland)
  - National Hot Sauce Day (United States)
- January 23
  - Bounty Day (Pitcairn Island)
  - Espousals of the Blessed Virgin Mary (Roman Catholic Church)
  - National Pie Day (United States)
  - Netaji Subhas Chandra Bose's Jayanti (Orissa, Tripura, and West Bengal, India)
  - World Freedom Day (Taiwan and South Korea)
- January 24
  - Feast of Our Lady of Peace (Roman Catholic Church), and its related observances:
    - Feria de Alasitas (La Paz)
  - Moebius Syndrome Awareness Day (international observance)
  - National Peanut Butter Day (United States)
  - Unification Day (Romania)
- January 25
  - 2011 Revolution Day (Egypt)
  - Burns night (Scotland, Scottish community)
  - Dydd Santes Dwynwen (Wales)
  - Feast of the Conversion of Saint Paul (Eastern Orthodox, Oriental Orthodox, Roman Catholic, Anglican and Lutheran churches, which concludes the Week of Prayer for Christian Unity)
  - National Police Day (Egypt)
  - National Voters' Day (India)
  - Tatiana Day (Russia, Eastern Orthodox)
- January 26
  - Australia Day (Australia)
  - Duarte Day (Dominican Republic)
  - Engineer's Day (Panama)
  - International Customs Day
  - Liberation Day (Uganda)
  - Republic Day (India)
- January 27
  - Day of the lifting of the siege of Leningrad (Russia)
  - Liberation of the remaining inmates of Auschwitz-related observances:
    - Holocaust Memorial Day (UK)
    - Holocaust Remembrance Day (Sweden)
    - International Holocaust Remembrance Day
    - Memorial Day (Italy)
    - Memorial Day for the Victims of the Holocaust and Prevention of Crimes against Humanity (Czech Republic)
    - Memorial Day for the Victims of National Socialism (Germany)
    - National Holocaust Memorial Day (Greece)
  - Family Literacy Day (Canada)
  - Feast of Saint Slava (Serbia)
  - National Chocolate Cake Day (United States)
  - Saint Devota's Day (Monaco)
- January 28
  - Army Day (Armenia)
  - Data Privacy Day (international observance)
- January 29
  - Kansas Day (Kansas, United States)
- January 30
  - Day of Azerbaijani customs (Azerbaijan)
  - Day of Saudade (Brazil)
  - Fred Korematsu Day (California, United States)
  - Martyrdom of Mahatma Gandhi-related observances:
    - Martyrs' Day (India)
    - School Day of Non-violence and Peace (Spain)
    - Start of the Season for Nonviolence January 30 – April 4
  - Teacher's Day (Greece)
- January 31
  - Amartithi (Meherabad, India, followers of Meher Baba)
  - Independence Day (Nauru)
  - Me-Dam-Me-Phi (Ahom people)
  - Street Children's Day (Austria)
