= Jump Up =

Jump Up, jump up, or jump-up may refer to:

== Music ==
=== Genres ===
- Jump up (bouyon), a predecessor genre of the bouyon music of Dominica, Martinique and Guadeloupe
- Jump-up (drum and bass), a subgenre of drum and bass

=== Albums ===
- Jump Up! (Elton John album), 1982
- Jump Up (Supercar album), 1999
- JumpUP!, by Pe'z, 2013
- Jump Up, an EP by F.T. Island, 2009

=== Songs ===
- "Jump Up!", by Elvis Costello, 1993
- "Jump Up", by Major Lazer from Guns Don't Kill People... Lazers Do, 2009

== Other uses ==
- Jump up (Australia), a colloquial name for a type of mesa in the Outback
- Jump-up Day, a holiday celebrated in Montserrat

== See also ==
- Johnny Jump Up (disambiguation)
