= Tobacco smoking =

Burning tobacco and inhaling the smoke

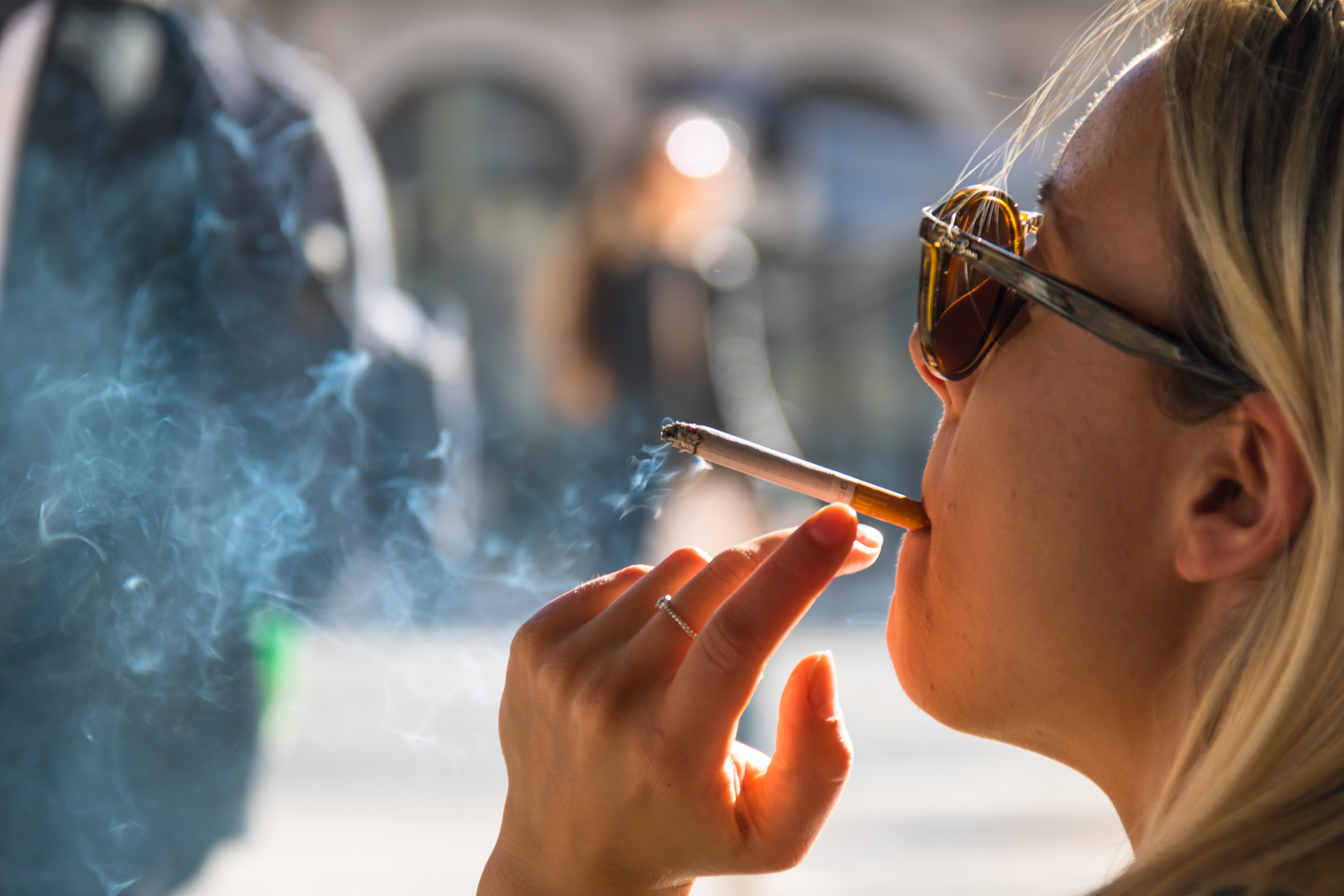
A woman smoking a cigarette, the most common form of tobacco smoking.

Tobacco smoking is the practice of burning tobacco and the absorption of the resulting smoke into one's body. The smoke may be inhaled, as is done with cigarettes, or released from the mouth, as is done with pipes and cigars. The practice is believed to have begun as early as 5000–3000 BC in Mesoamerica and South America. Tobacco was introduced to Eurasia in the 17th century by European colonists, where it followed common trade routes. The practice encountered criticism from its first import into the Western world onward but embedded itself in certain strata of several societies before becoming widespread upon the introduction of automated cigarette-rolling apparatus.

Smoking is the most common method of consuming tobacco, and tobacco is the most common substance smoked. The agricultural product is often mixed with additives and then combusted. The resulting smoke, which contains various active substances, the most significant of which is the addictive psychostimulant drug nicotine (a compound naturally found in tobacco), is absorbed through the alveoli in the lungs or the oral mucosa. Many substances in cigarette smoke, chiefly nicotine, trigger chemical reactions in nerve endings, which heighten heart rate, alertness and reaction time, among other things. Dopamine and endorphins are released, which are often associated with pleasure, leading to addiction.

German scientists identified a link between smoking and lung cancer in the late 1920s, leading to the first anti-smoking campaign in modern history, albeit one truncated by the collapse of Nazi Germany at the end of World War II. In 1950, British researchers demonstrated a clear relationship between smoking and cancer. Evidence continued to mount in the 1960s, which prompted political action against the practice. Rates of consumption since 1965 in the developed world have either peaked or declined. However, they continue to climb in the developing world. As of 2008 to 2010, tobacco is used by about 49% of men and 11% of women aged 15 or older in fourteen low-income and middle-income countries (Bangladesh, Brazil, China, Egypt, India, Mexico, Philippines, Russia, Thailand, Turkey, Ukraine, Uruguay, and Vietnam), with about 80% of this usage in the form of smoking. The gender gap tends to be less pronounced in lower age groups. According to the World Health Organization, 8 million annual deaths are caused by tobacco smoking.

Many smokers begin during adolescence or early adulthood. A 2009 study of first smoking experiences of seventh-grade students found out that the most common factor leading students to smoke is cigarette advertisements. Smoking by parents, siblings, and friends also encourages students to smoke. During the early stages, a combination of perceived pleasure acting as positive reinforcement and desire to respond to social peer pressure may offset the unpleasant symptoms of initial use, which typically include nausea and coughing. After an individual has smoked for some years, the avoidance of nicotine withdrawal symptoms and negative reinforcement become the key motivations to continue.

== History ==
=== Use in ancient cultures ===
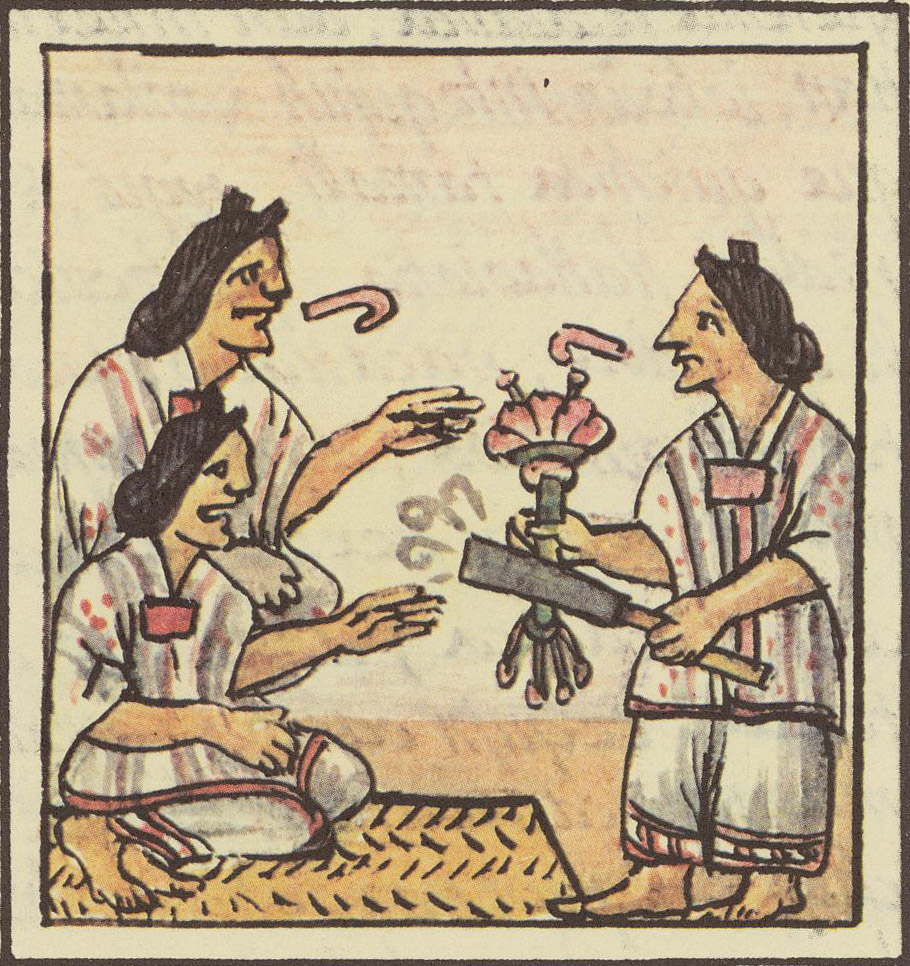
Aztec women are handed flowers and smoking tubes before eating at a banquet, Florentine Codex, 16th century.

One archaeological find raises the possibility of tobacco-smoking in the area of present-day Nevada about 12,000 years ago.

Systematic tobacco use dates back to as early as 5000–3000 BC when the agricultural product began to be cultivated in Mesoamerica and South America; consumption later came to involve burning the plant substance, either by accident or with the intent of exploring other means of consumption. The practice worked its way into shamanistic rituals. Many ancient civilizations – such as the Babylonians, the Indians, and the Chinese – burned incense during religious rituals. Smoking in the Americas probably had its origins in the incense-burning ceremonies of shamans but was later adopted for pleasure or as a social tool. The smoking of tobacco and various hallucinogenic drugs was used to achieve trances and to come into contact with the spirit world. Also, to stimulate respiration, tobacco-smoke enemas were used.

Eastern North American tribes would carry large amounts of tobacco in pouches as a readily accepted trade item and would often smoke it in ceremonial pipes, either in sacred ceremonies or to seal bargains. Adults as well as children enjoyed the practice. It was believed that tobacco was a gift from the Creator and that the exhaled tobacco smoke was capable of carrying one's thoughts and prayers to the Great Spirit.

Apart from smoking, tobacco was used as medicine. As a pain killer, it was used for earache and toothache and occasionally as a poultice. Desert Indians regarded smoking as a cure for colds, especially if the tobacco was mixed with the leaves of the small Desert sage, Salvia dorrii, or the root of Indian balsam or cough root, Leptotaenia multifida, the addition of which was thought to be particularly good for asthma and tuberculosis.

=== Popularization ===
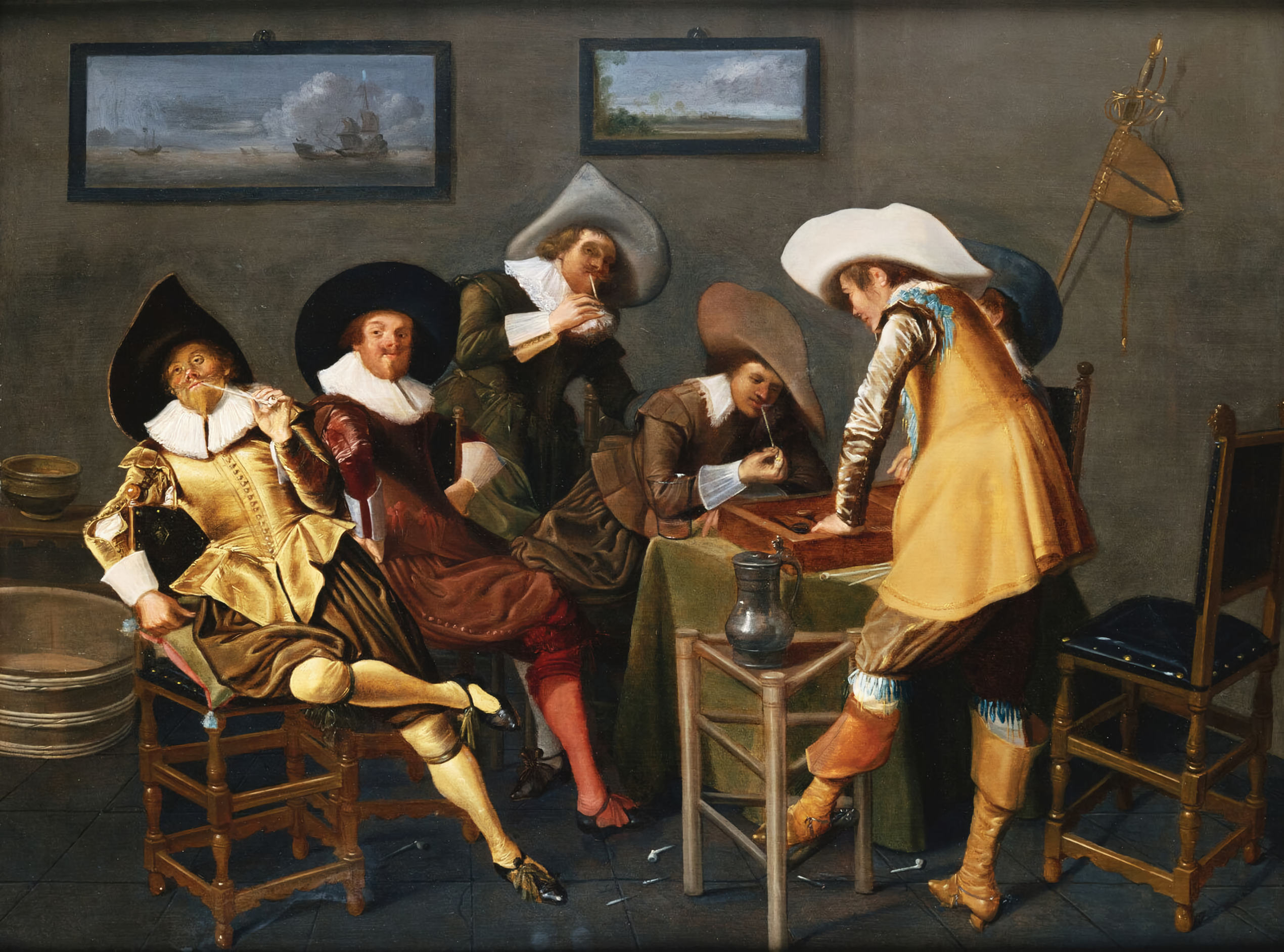
Gentlemen Smoking and Playing Backgammon in a Tavern by Dirck Hals, 1627

In 1612, six years after the settlement of Jamestown, Virginia, John Rolfe was credited as the first settler to successfully raise tobacco as a cash crop. The demand quickly grew as tobacco, referred to as "brown gold", revived the Virginia joint stock company from its failed gold expeditions. To meet demands from the Old World, tobacco was grown in succession, quickly depleting the soil. This became a motivator to settle west into the unknown continent, and likewise an expansion of tobacco production.

Frenchman Jean Nicot (from whose name the word nicotine is derived) introduced tobacco to France in 1560, and tobacco then spread to England. The first report of a smoking Englishman is of a sailor in Bristol in 1556, seen "emitting smoke from his nostrils". Like tea, coffee, and opium, tobacco was just one of many intoxicants that were originally used as a form of medicine. Tobacco was introduced around 1600 by French merchants in what today is modern-day Gambia and Senegal. At the same time, caravans from Morocco brought tobacco to the areas around Timbuktu, and the Portuguese brought the commodity (and the plant) to southern Africa, establishing the popularity of tobacco throughout all of Africa by the 1650s.

Soon after its introduction to the Old World, tobacco came under frequent criticism from state and religious leaders. James VI and I, King of Scotland and England, produced the treatise A Counterblaste to Tobacco in 1604, and also introduced excise duty on the product. Murad IV, sultan of the Ottoman Empire, 1623–40, was among the first to attempt a smoking ban by claiming it was a threat to public morals and health. The Chongzhen Emperor of China issued an edict banning smoking two years before his death and the overthrow of the Ming dynasty. Later, the Manchu rulers of the Qing dynasty would proclaim smoking "a more heinous crime than that even of neglecting archery". In Edo period Japan, some of the earliest tobacco plantations were scorned by the shogunate as being a threat to the military economy by letting valuable farmland go to waste for the use of a recreational drug instead of being used to plant food crops.

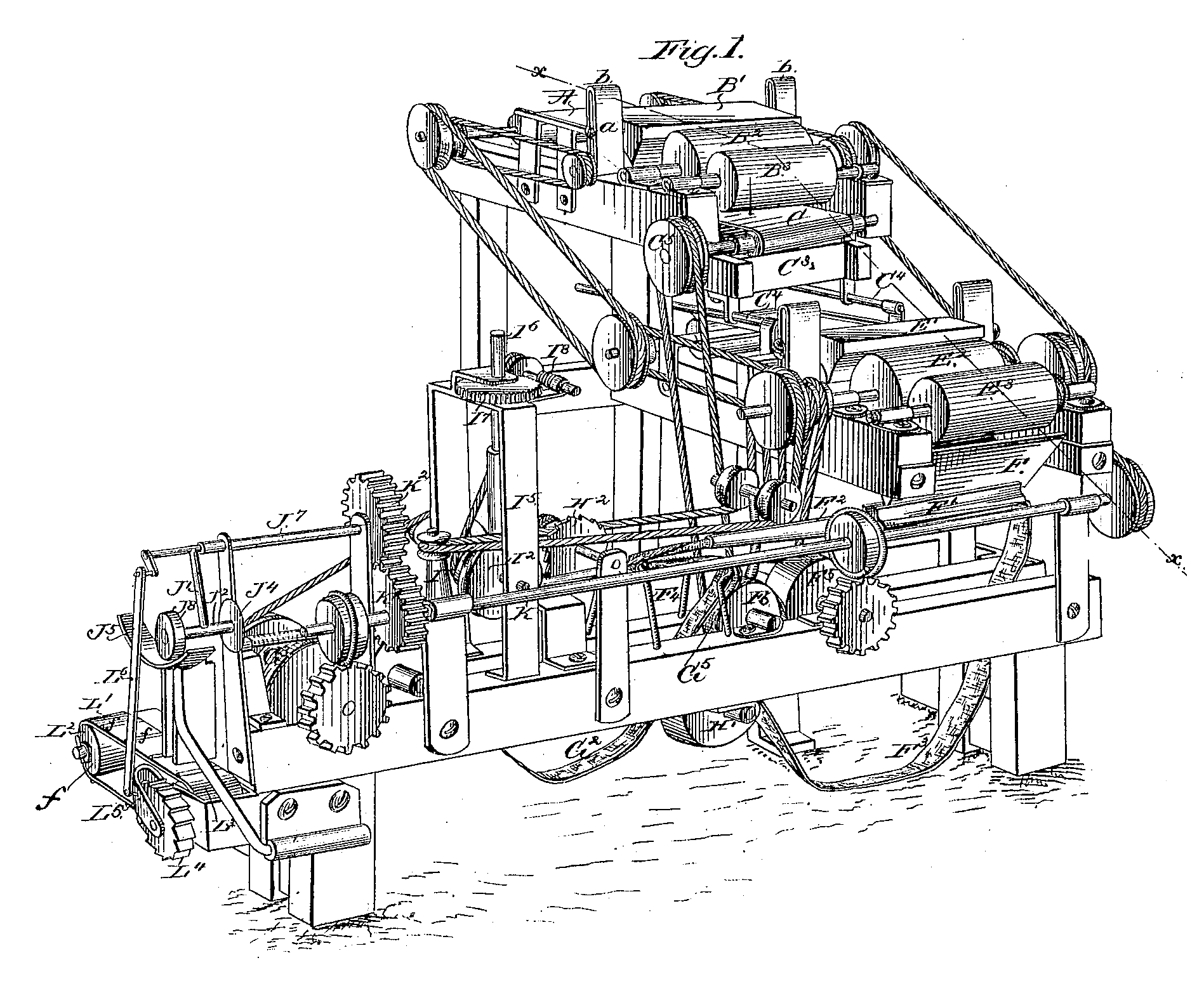
Bonsack's cigarette rolling machine, as shown on U.S. patent 238,640

Religious leaders have often been prominent among those who considered smoking immoral or outright blasphemous. In 1634, the Patriarch of Moscow forbade the sale of tobacco, and sentenced men and women who flouted the ban to have their nostrils slit and their backs flayed. Pope Urban VIII likewise condemned smoking in holy places in a papal bull of 1624. Despite some concerted efforts, restrictions and bans were largely ignored. When James I of England, a staunch smoking opponent and the author of the aforementioned Counterblaste to Tobacco, tried to curb the new trend by enforcing a 4000% increase of tobacco taxation in 1604, it was unsuccessful, as suggested by the presence of around 7,000 tobacco outlets in London by the early 17th century. From this point on, for some centuries, several administrations withdrew from efforts at discouragement and instead turned the tobacco trade and cultivation into sometimes lucrative government monopolies.

By the mid-17th century, most major civilizations had been introduced to tobacco smoking and, in many cases, had already assimilated it into the native culture, despite some continued attempts on the part of rulers to eliminate the practice with penalties or fines. Tobacco, both product and plant, followed the major trade routes to major ports and markets, and then into the hinterlands. The English language term smoking appears to have entered currency in the late 18th century, before which less abbreviated descriptions of the practice such as drinking smoke were also in use.

Growth in the US remained stable until the American Civil War in the 1860s when the primary agricultural workforce shifted from slavery to sharecropping. This, along with a change in demand, accompanied the industrialization of cigarette production as craftsman James Bonsack created a machine in 1881 to partially automate their manufacture.

=== Social attitudes and public health ===
In 1912 and 1932 in Germany, anti-smoking groups, often associated with anti-liquor groups, first published advocacy against the consumption of tobacco in the journal Der Tabakgegner (The Tobacco Opponent). In 1929, Fritz Lickint of Dresden, Germany, published a paper containing formal statistical evidence of a lung cancer–tobacco link. During the Great Depression, Adolf Hitler condemned his earlier smoking habit as a waste of money, and later with stronger assertions. This movement was further strengthened with Nazi reproductive policy as women who smoked were viewed as unsuitable to be wives and mothers in a German family. In the 20th century, smoking was common. Social events like the smoke night promoted the habit.

The anti-tobacco movement in Nazi Germany did not reach across enemy lines during the Second World War, as anti-smoking groups quickly lost popular support. By the end of the Second World War, American cigarette manufacturers quickly reentered the German black market. Illegal smuggling of tobacco became prevalent, and leaders of the Nazi anti-smoking campaign were silenced. As part of the Marshall Plan, the United States shipped free tobacco to Germany; with 24,000 tons in 1948 and 69,000 tons in 1949. Per capita yearly cigarette consumption in post-war Germany steadily rose from 460 in 1950 to 1,523 in 1963. By the end of the 20th century, anti-smoking campaigns in Germany were unable to exceed the effectiveness of the Nazi-era climax in the years 1939–41 and German tobacco health research was described by Robert N. Proctor as "muted".

A lengthy study conducted in order to establish the strong association necessary for legislative action (US cigarette consumption per person blue, male lung cancer rate brown)

In 1950, Richard Doll published research in the British Medical Journal showing a close link between smoking and lung cancer. Beginning in December 1952, the magazine Reader's Digest published "Cancer by the Carton", a series of articles that linked smoking with lung cancer.

In 1954, the British Doctors Study, a prospective study of some 40 thousand doctors for about 2.5 years, confirmed the suggestion, based on which the government issued advice that smoking and lung cancer rates were related. In January 1964, the United States Surgeon General's Report on Smoking and Health likewise began suggesting the relationship between smoking and cancer.

As scientific evidence mounted in the 1980s, tobacco companies claimed contributory negligence as the adverse health effects were previously unknown or lacked substantial credibility. Health authorities sided with these claims up until 1998, from which they reversed their position. The Tobacco Master Settlement Agreement, originally between the four largest US tobacco companies and the attorneys general of 46 states, restricted certain types of tobacco advertisement and required payments for health compensation, which later amounted to the largest civil settlement in United States history.

Social campaigns have been instituted in many places to discourage smoking, such as Canada's National Non-Smoking Week.

From 1965 to 2006, rates of smoking in the United States declined from 42% to 20.8%. The majority of those who quit were professional, affluent men. Although the per-capita number of smokers decreased, the average number of cigarettes consumed per person per day increased from 22 in 1954 to 30 in 1978. This paradoxical event suggests that those who quit smoking smoked less, while those who continued to smoke moved to smoke more light cigarettes. The trend has been paralleled by many industrialized nations as rates have either leveled-off or declined. In the developing world, however, tobacco consumption continued to rise at 3.4% in 2002. In Africa, smoking is in most areas considered to be modern, and many of the strong adverse opinions that prevail in the West receive much less attention. In 2008, Russia (70.2%), Indonesia (65.3%), Belarus (63.6%), Ukraine (63.3%), Laos (62.5%), Greece (62.4%), Jordan (61.7%), Tonga (61.1%), China (60.8%), and North Korea (59.5%) were ranked the first by adjusted prevalence estimate of the percent of male population smoking tobacco.

As of 2025, Bangladesh, India, and Nepal are on track to achieve at least a 30% relative reduction in tobacco use, according to the WHO global report on trends in prevalence of tobacco use 2000–2024. The WHO South-East Asia Region has shown the fastest progress globally, already meeting the global reduction target by 2021 through strong policies, taxation, and cessation initiatives. Despite this success, over 322 million adults in the region continue to use tobacco, underscoring the need for continued regulation and public health action.

== Consumption ==
=== Methods ===
Tobacco is an agricultural product processed from the fresh leaves of plants in the genus Nicotiana. The genus contains several species, of which Nicotiana tabacum is the most commonly grown. Nicotiana rustica follows second, containing higher concentrations of nicotine. The leaves are harvested and cured to allow the slow oxidation and degradation of carotenoids in tobacco leaves. This produces certain compounds in the tobacco leaves, which can be attributed to sweet hay, tea, rose oil, or fruity aromatic flavors. Before packaging, the tobacco is often combined with other additives to increase the addictive potency, shift the product's pH, or improve the effects of smoke by making it more palatable. In the United States, these additives are regulated to 599 substances. The product is then processed, packaged, and shipped to consumer markets.

Common methods of consuming tobacco include the following:

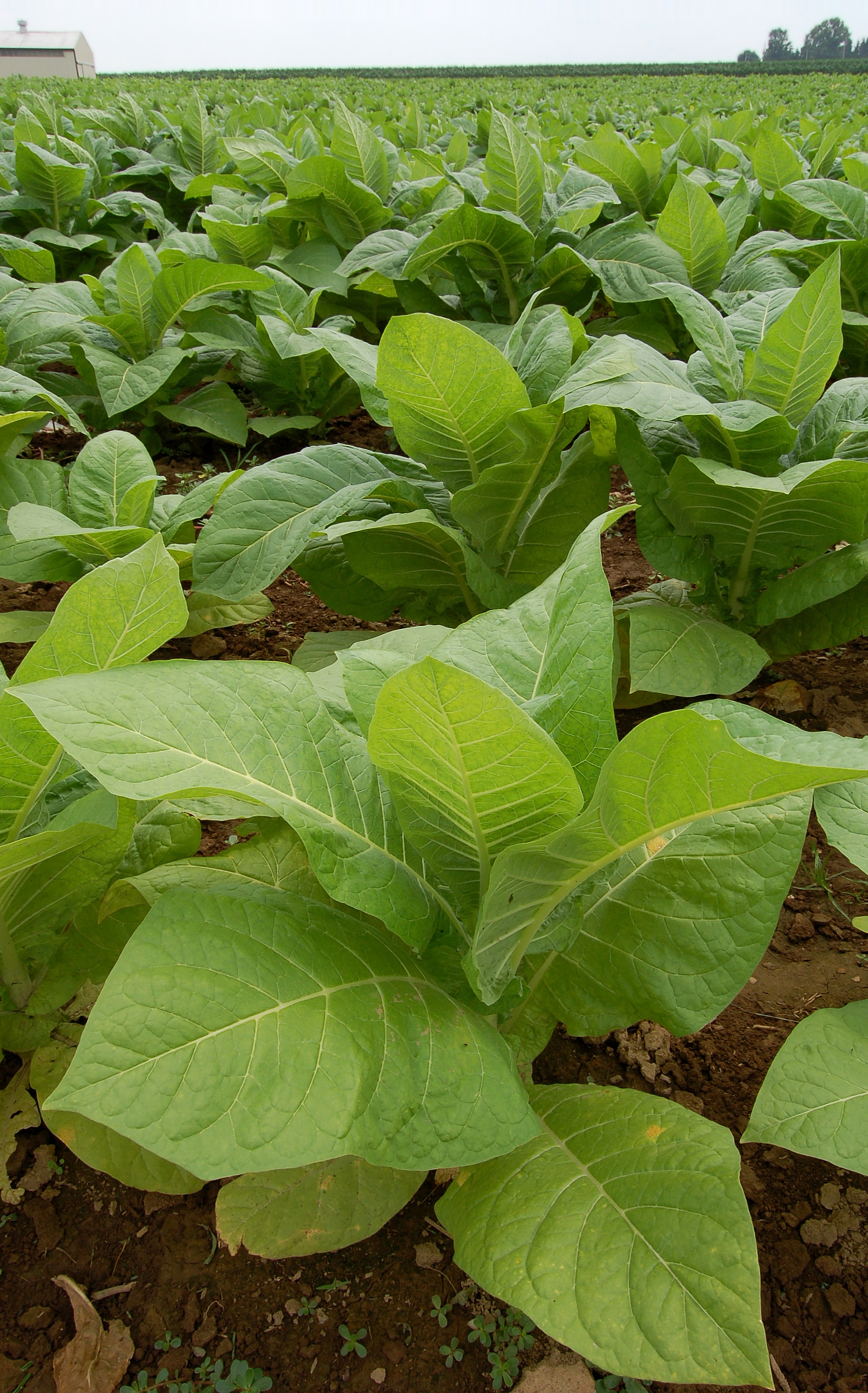
Tobacco field in Intercourse, Pennsylvania

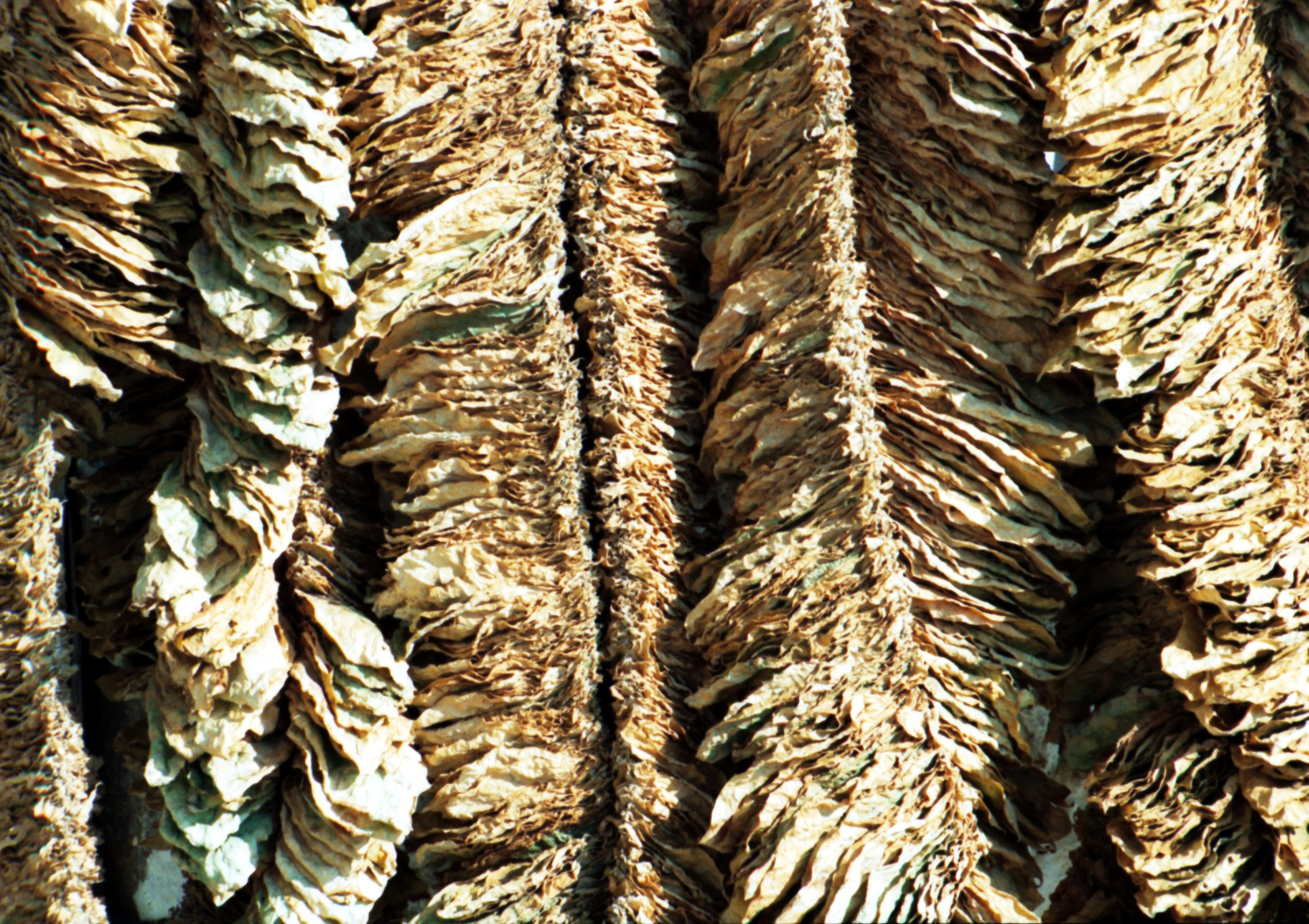
Basma leaves curing in the sun at Pomak village of Xanthi, Thrace, Greece

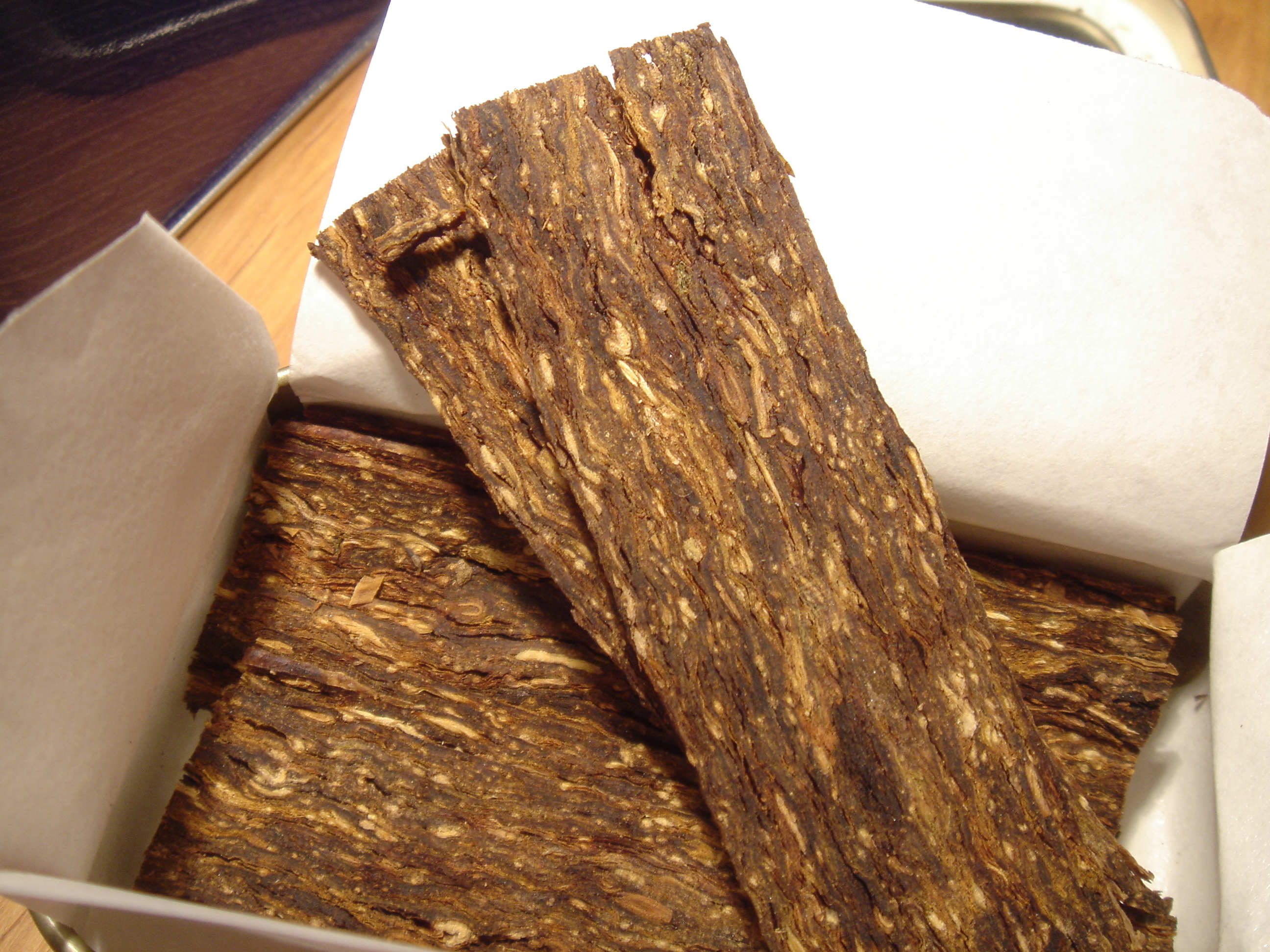
Processed tobacco pressed into flakes for pipe smoking

Beedi
Beedis are thin South Asian cigarettes filled with tobacco flakes and wrapped in a tendu leaf tied with a string at one end. They produce higher levels of carbon monoxide, nicotine, and tar than cigarettes typical in the United States.

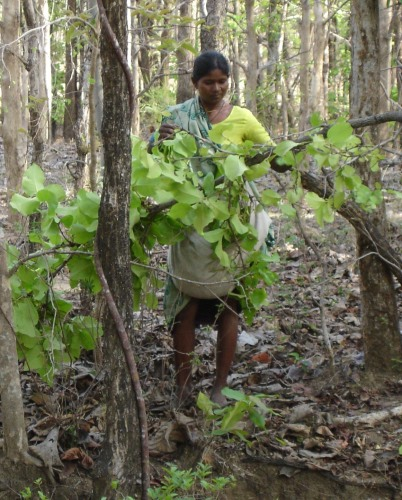
Tendu Patta (Leaf) collection for Beedi industries

Cigars
Cigars are tightly rolled bundles of dried and fermented tobacco that are ignited so that smoke may be drawn into the smoker's mouth. They are generally not inhaled because of the high alkalinity of the smoke, which can quickly irritate the trachea and lungs. The prevalence of cigar smoking varies depending on location, historical period, and population surveyed, and prevalence estimates vary somewhat depending on the survey method. The United States is the top consuming country by far, followed by Germany and the United Kingdom; the US and Western Europe account for about 75% of cigar sales worldwide. As of 2005 it is estimated that 4.3% of men and 0.3% of women smoke cigars in the US.

Cigarettes
Cigarettes, French for "small cigar", are a product consumed through smoking and manufactured out of cured and finely cut tobacco leaves and reconstituted tobacco, often combined with other additives, which are then rolled or stuffed into a paper-wrapped cylinder. Cigarettes are ignited and inhaled, usually through a cellulose acetate filter, into the mouth and lungs.

Hookah
Hookah are a single or multi-stemmed (often glass-based) water pipe for smoking. Originally from India, the hookah was a symbol of pride and honor for the landlords, kings, and other such high-class people. Now, the hookah has gained immense popularity, especially in the Middle East. A hookah operates by water filtration and indirect heat. It can be used for smoking herbal fruits, tobacco, or cannabis.
Kretek
Kretek are cigarettes made with a complex blend of tobacco, cloves and a flavoring "sauce". It was first introduced in the 1880s in Kudus, Java, to deliver the medicinal eugenol of cloves to the lungs. The quality and variety of tobacco play an important role in kretek production, from which kretek can contain more than 30 types of tobacco. Minced dried clove buds, weighing about one-third of the tobacco blend, are added to add flavoring. In 2004, the United States prohibited cigarettes from having a "characterizing flavor" of certain ingredients other than tobacco and menthol, thereby removing kretek from being classified as cigarettes.
Pipe smoking
Pipe smoking is done with a tobacco pipe, typically consisting of a small chamber (the bowl) for the combustion of the tobacco to be smoked and a thin stem (shank) that ends in a mouthpiece (the bit). Shredded pieces of tobacco are placed into the chamber and ignited.
Roll-your-own
Roll-your-own or hand-rolled cigarettes, often called "rollies", "cigi" or "Roll-ups", are very popular, particularly in Europe. These are prepared from loose tobacco, cigarette papers, and filters, all bought separately. They are usually much cheaper than ready-made cigarettes, and small contraptions can be purchased, making the process easier.
Vaporizer
A vaporizer is a device used to sublimate the active ingredients of plant material. Rather than burning the herb, which produces potentially irritating, toxic, or carcinogenic by-products, a vaporizer heats the material in a partial vacuum so that the active compounds contained in the plant boil off into a vapor. This method is often preferable when medically administering the smoke substance, as opposed to directly pyrolyzing the plant material.

=== Physiology ===
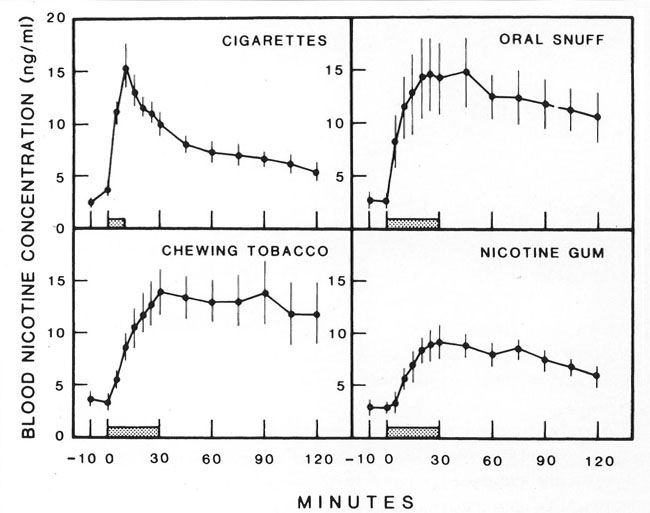
A graph that shows the efficiency of smoking as a way to absorb nicotine compared to other forms of intake

The active substances in tobacco, especially cigarettes, are administered by burning the leaves and inhaling the vaporized gas that results. This quickly and effectively delivers substances into the bloodstream by absorption through the alveoli in the lungs. The lungs contain some 300 million alveoli, which amounts to a surface area of over 70 m^{2} (about the size of a tennis court). This method is not completely efficient as not all of the smoke will be inhaled, and some amount of the active substances will be lost in the process of combustion, pyrolysis. Pipe and Cigar smoke are not inhaled because of their high alkalinity, which is irritating to the trachea and lungs. However, because of its higher alkalinity (pH 8.5) compared to cigarette smoke (pH 5.3), non-ionized nicotine is more readily absorbed through the mucous membranes in the mouth. Nicotine absorption from cigar and pipe, however, is much less than that from cigarette smoke. Nicotine and cocaine activate similar patterns of neurons, which supports the existence of common substrates among these drugs.

The absorbed nicotine mimics nicotinic acetylcholine, which when bound to nicotinic acetylcholine receptors prevents the reuptake of acetylcholine thereby increasing that neurotransmitter in those areas of the body. These nicotinic acetylcholine receptors are located in the central nervous system and at the nerve-muscle junction of skeletal muscles; whose activity increases heart rate, alertness, and faster reaction times. Nicotine acetylcholine stimulation is not directly addictive. However, since dopamine-releasing neurons are abundant on nicotine receptors, dopamine is released; and, in the nucleus accumbens, dopamine is associated with motivation causing reinforcing behavior. Dopamine increase, in the prefrontal cortex, may also increase working memory.

When tobacco is smoked, most of the nicotine is pyrolyzed. However, a dose sufficient to cause mild somatic dependency and mild to strong psychological dependency remains. There is also a formation of harmane (an MAO inhibitor) from the acetaldehyde in tobacco smoke. This may play a role in nicotine addiction by facilitating a dopamine release in the nucleus accumbens as a response to nicotine stimuli. Using rat studies, withdrawal after repeated exposure to nicotine results in less responsive nucleus accumbens cells, which produce dopamine responsible for reinforcement.

=== Demographics ===
As of 2000, smoking was practiced by around 1.22 billion people. At current rates of 'smoker replacement' and market growth, this may reach around 1.9 billion in 2025.

Smoking may be up to five times more prevalent among men than women in some communities, although the gender gap usually declines with younger age. In some developed countries smoking rates for men have peaked and begun to decline, while for women they continue to climb.

As of 2002, about twenty percent of young teenagers (13–15) smoked worldwide. 80,000 to 100,000 children begin smoking every day, roughly half of whom live in Asia. Half of those who start smoking in adolescent years are projected to go on to smoke for 15 to 20 years. As of 2019 in the United States, roughly 800,000 high school students smoke.

The World Health Organization (WHO) states that "Much of the disease burden and premature mortality attributable to tobacco use disproportionately affect the poor". Of the 1.22 billion smokers, 1 billion of them live in developing or transitional economies. Smoking rates have leveled off or declined in the developed world. In the developing world, however, tobacco consumption is rising by 3.4% per year as of 2002.

The WHO in 2004 projected 58.8 million deaths to occur globally, from which 5.4 million are tobacco-attributed, and 4.9 million as of 2007. As of 2002, 70% of the deaths are in developing countries. As of 2017, smoking causes one in ten deaths worldwide, with half of those deaths in the US, China, India and Russia.

share of men who are smoking

share of women who are smoking

== Psychology ==
=== Takeup ===
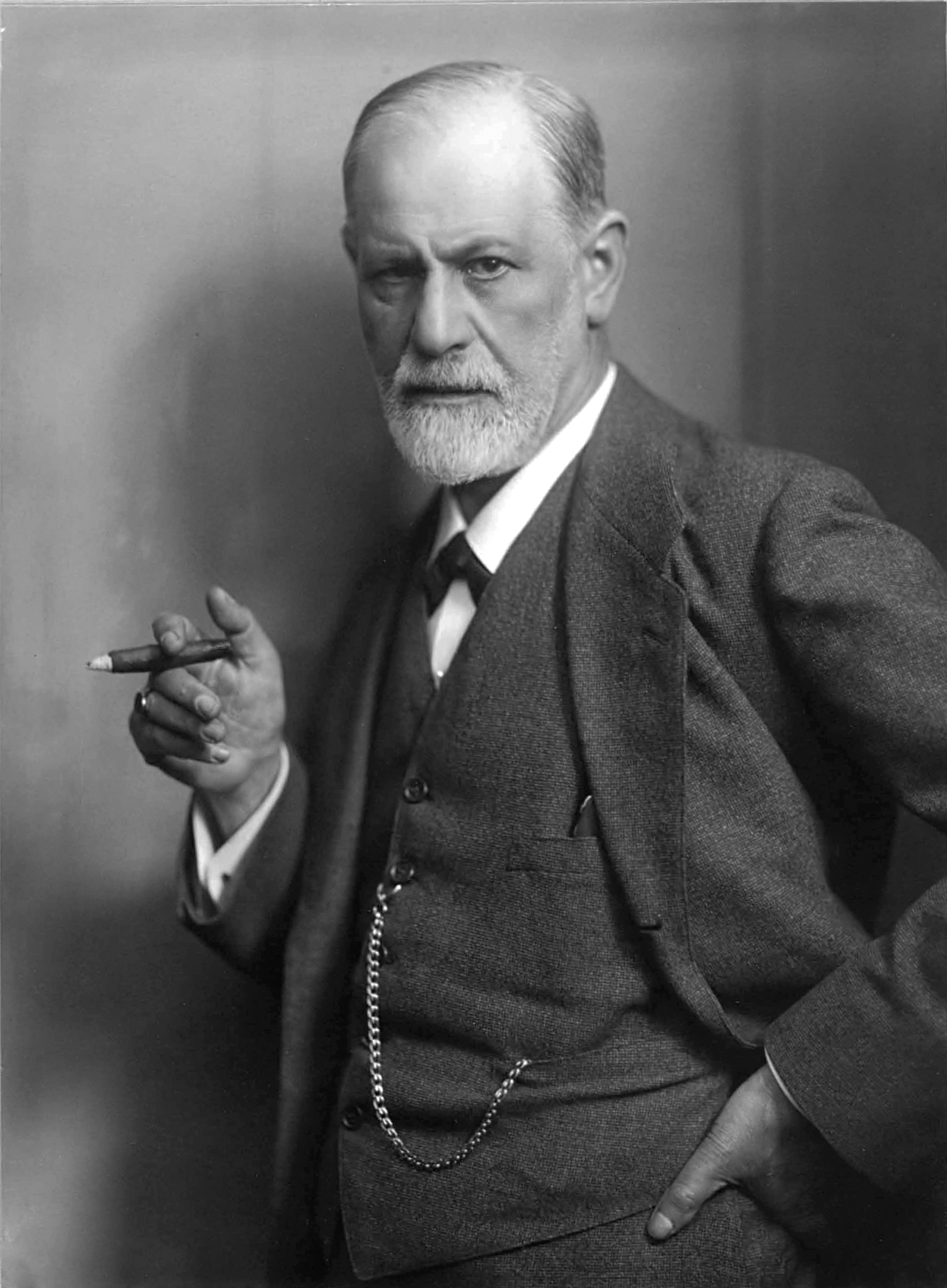
Sigmund Freud, whose doctor assisted his suicide because of oral cancer caused by smoking

Most smokers begin smoking during adolescence or early adulthood. Some studies also show that smoking can be linked to various mental health complications. Smoking has elements of risk-taking and rebellion, which often appeal to young people. The presence of peers who smoke and media featuring high-status models smoking may also encourage smoking. Because teenagers are influenced more by their peers than by adults, attempts by parents, schools, and health professionals at preventing people from trying cigarettes are often unsuccessful.

Children with smoking parents are more likely to smoke than children with non-smoking parents. Children of parents who smoke are less likely to quit smoking. One study found that parental smoking cessation was associated with less adolescent smoking, except when the other parent currently smoked. A current study tested the relation of adolescent smoking to rules regulating where adults are allowed to smoke in the home. Results showed that restrictive home smoking policies were associated with a lower likelihood of trying smoking for both middle and high school students.

Behavioural research generally indicates that teenagers begin their smoking habits due to peer pressure and cultural influence portrayed by friends. However, one study found that direct pressure to smoke cigarettes played a less significant part in adolescent smoking, with adolescents also reporting low levels of both normative and direct pressure to smoke cigarettes. Mere exposure to tobacco retailers may motivate smoking behaviour in adults. A similar study suggested that individuals may play a more active role in starting to smoke than has previously been thought and that social processes other than peer pressure also need to be taken into account. Another study's results indicated that peer pressure was significantly associated with smoking behavior across all age and gender cohorts, but that intrapersonal factors were significantly more important to the smoking behavior of 12- to 13-year-old girls than same-age boys. Within the 14- to 15-year-old age group, one peer pressure variable emerged as a significantly more important predictor of girls' than boys' smoking. It is debated whether peer pressure or self-selection is a greater cause of adolescent smoking.

Psychologist Hans Eysenck (who was later questioned for implausible results and unsafe publications) developed a personality profile for the typical smoker. Extraversion is the trait that is most associated with smoking, and smokers tend to be sociable, impulsive, risk-taking, and excitement-seeking individuals.

=== Persistence ===
The reasons given by some smokers for this activity have been categorized as addictive smoking, pleasure from smoking, tension reduction/relaxation, social smoking, stimulation, habit/automatism, and handling. There are gender differences in how much each of these reasons contributes, with females more likely than males to cite tension reduction/relaxation, stimulation and social smoking.

Some smokers argue that the depressant effect of smoking allows them to calm their nerves, often allowing for increased concentration. However, according to the Imperial College London, "Nicotine seems to provide both a stimulant and a depressant effect, and the effect it has at any time is likely determined by the mood of the user, the environment, and the circumstances of use. Studies have suggested that low doses have a depressant effect, while higher doses have a stimulant effect."

=== Patterns ===
Several studies have established that cigarette sales and smoking follow distinct time-related patterns. For example, cigarette sales in the United States of America have been shown to follow a strongly seasonal pattern, with the high months being the summer months and the low months being the winter months.

Similarly, smoking has been shown to follow distinct circadian patterns during the waking day, with the high point usually occurring shortly after waking in the morning and shortly before going to sleep at night.

== Effects ==
=== Health ===
Common adverse effects of tobacco smoking. The more common effects are in boldface.

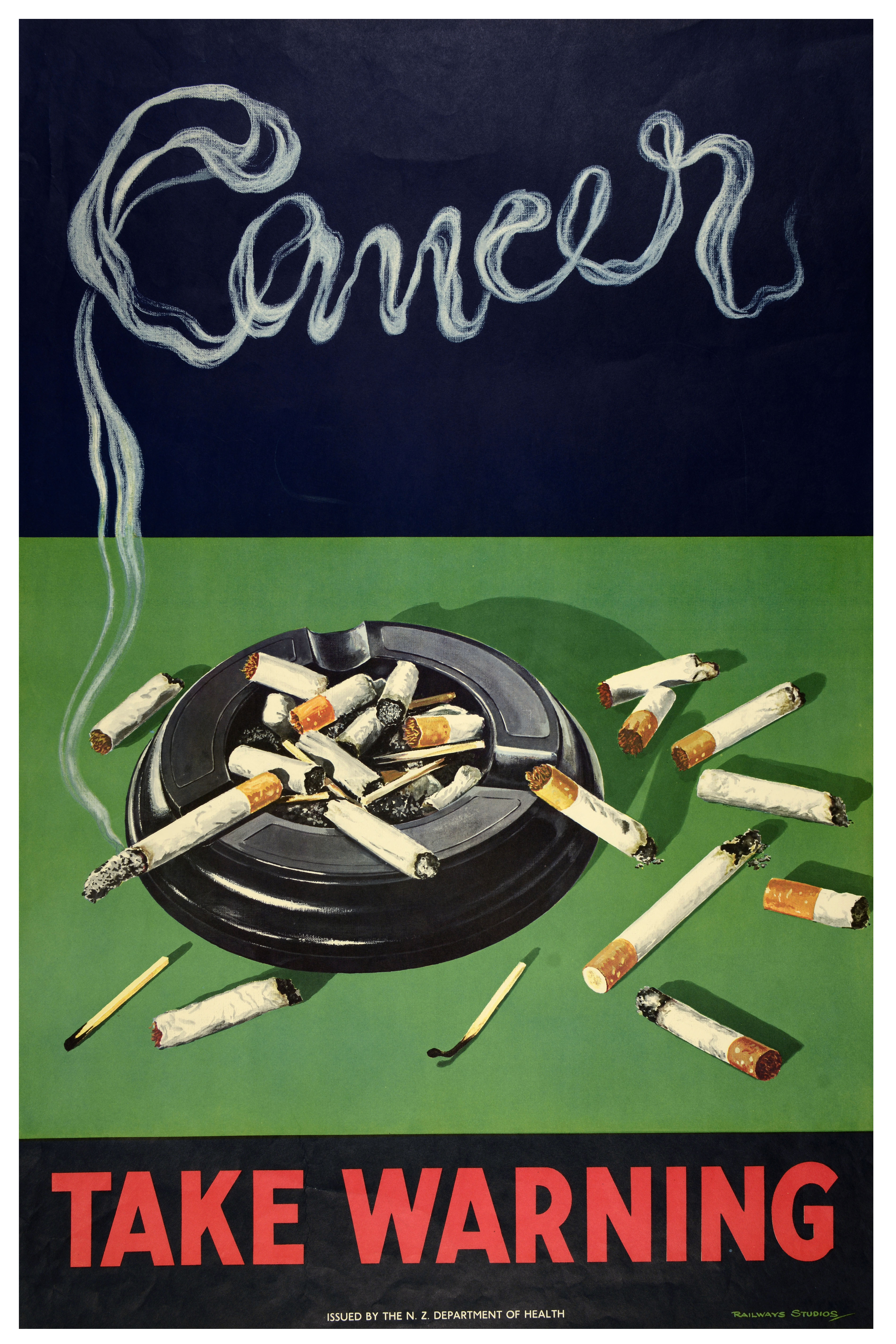
Cancer prevention poster from New Zealand

Tobacco smoking is the leading cause of preventable death and a global public health concern. There are 1.3 billion tobacco users in the world, as per latest data from WHO. One person dies every six seconds from a tobacco related disease.

Tobacco use leads most commonly to diseases affecting the heart and lungs, with smoking being a major risk factor for heart attacks, strokes, chronic obstructive pulmonary disease (COPD), idiopathic pulmonary fibrosis (IPF), and emphysema.

Smoking tobacco causes various types and subtypes of cancers (particularly lung cancer, cancers of the oropharynx, larynx, and mouth, esophageal and pancreatic cancer). Using tobacco, especially together with alcohol, is a major risk factor for head and neck cancer. 72% of head and neck cancer cases are caused by using both alcohol and tobacco. This rises to 89% when looking specifically at laryngeal cancer.

Cigarette smoking increases the risk of Crohn's disease as well as the severity of the course of the disease. It is also the number one cause of bladder cancer. Cigarette smoking has also been associated with sarcopenia, the age-related loss of muscle mass and strength. The smoke from tobacco elicits carcinogenic effects on the tissues of the body that are exposed to the smoke. Regular cigar smoking is known to carry serious health risks, including increased risk of developing various types and subtypes of cancers, respiratory diseases, cardiovascular diseases, cerebrovascular diseases, periodontal diseases, teeth decay and loss, and malignant diseases.

Tobacco smoke is a complex mixture of over 7,000 toxic chemicals, 98 of which are associated with an increased risk of cardiovascular disease and 69 of which are known to be carcinogenic. The most important chemicals causing cancer are those that produce DNA damage, since such damage appears to be the primary underlying cause of cancer. The most carcinogenic compounds in cigarette smoke are acrolein, formaldehyde, acrylonitrile, 1,3-butadiene, acetaldehyde, ethylene oxide, and isoprene. In addition to the aforementioned toxic chemicals, flavored tobacco contains flavorings which upon heating release toxic chemicals and carcinogens such as carbon monoxide (CO), polycyclic aromatic hydrocarbons (PAHs), furans, phenols, aldehydes (such as acrolein), and acids, in addition to nitrogenous carcinogens, alcohols, and heavy metals, all of which are dangerous to human health. A comparison of 13 common hookah flavors found that melon flavors are the most dangerous, with their smoke containing four classes of hazards in high concentrations.

The World Health Organization estimates that tobacco caused 8 million deaths in 2004 and 100 million deaths over the 20th century. Similarly, the United States Centers for Disease Control and Prevention describes tobacco use as "the single most important preventable risk to human health in developed countries and an important cause of premature death worldwide." Although 70% of smokers state their intention to quit, only 3–5% are successful.

The probabilities of death from lung cancer before age 75 in the United Kingdom are 0.2% for men who never smoked (0.4% for women), 5.5% for male former smokers (2.6% in women), 15.9% for current male smokers (9.5% for women) and 24.4% for male "heavy smokers" defined as smoking more than 25 cigarettes per day (18.5% for women). Tobacco smoke can combine with other carcinogens present within the environment to produce elevated degrees of lung cancer.

The risk of lung cancer decreases almost from the first day someone quits smoking, and it drops by 50% after 10 years of smoking cessation. Healthy cells that have escaped mutations grow and replace the damaged ones in the lungs. In the research dated December 2019, 40% of cells in former smokers resembled those of individuals who had never smoked.

Rates of smoking have generally leveled off or declined in the developed world. Smoking rates in the United States have dropped by half from 1965 to 2006, from 42% to 20.8% in adults. In the developing world, tobacco consumption is rising by 3.4% per year.

Smoking alters the transcriptome of the lung parenchyma; the expression levels of a panel of seven genes (KMO, CD1A, SPINK5, TREM2, CYBB, DNASE2B, FGG) are increased in the lung tissue of smokers.

Passive smoking is the inhalation of tobacco smoke by individuals who are not actively smoking. This smoke is known as second-hand smoke (SHS) or environmental tobacco smoke (ETS) when the burning end is present, and third-hand smoke after the burning end has been extinguished. Because of its negative implications, exposure to SHS has played a central role in the regulation of tobacco products. Six hundred thousand deaths were attributed to SHS in 2004. It has also been known to produce skin conditions such as freckles and dryness.

Smokers are at greater risk of developing psychotic disorder. Tobacco has also been described an anaphrodisiac due to its propensity for causing erectile dysfunction. There is a correlation between tobacco smoking and a reduced risk of Parkinson's disease.

=== Economic ===
In countries where there is a universally funded healthcare system, the government covers the cost of medical care for smokers who become ill through smoking in the form of increased tobacco taxation. Two broad debating positions exist on this front, the "pro-smoking" argument suggests that heavy smokers generally do not live long enough to develop the costly and chronic illnesses that affect the elderly, reducing society's healthcare burden, and the "anti-smoking" argument suggests that the healthcare burden is increased because smokers get chronic illnesses younger and at a higher rate than the general population. Data on both positions has been contested. The Centers for Disease Control and Prevention published research in 2002 claiming that the cost of each pack of cigarettes sold in the United States was more than $7 in medical care and lost productivity. The cost may be higher, with another study putting it as high as $41 per pack, most of which however is on the individual and his/her family. This is how one author of that study puts it when he explains the very low cost for others: "The reason the number is low is that for private pensions, Social Security, and Medicare — the biggest factors in calculating costs to society — smoking actually saves money. Smokers die at a younger age and don't draw on the funds they've paid into those systems." Other research demonstrates that premature death caused by smoking may redistribute Social Security income in unexpected ways that affect behavior and reduce the economic well-being of smokers and their dependents. To further support this, whatever the rate of smoking consumption is per day, smokers have a greater lifetime medical cost on average compared to a non-smoker by an estimated $6000. Between the cost for lost productivity and health care expenditures combined, cigarette smoking costs at least 193 billion dollars (Research also shows that smokers earn less money than nonsmokers). As for secondhand smoke, the cost is over 10 billion dollars.

By contrast, some non-scientific studies, including one conducted by Philip Morris in the Czech Republic called Public Finance Balance of Smoking in the Czech Republic and another by the Cato Institute, support the opposite position. Philip Morris has explicitly apologized for the former study, saying: "The funding and public release of this study, which, among other things, detailed purported cost savings to the Czech Republic due to premature deaths of smokers, exhibited terrible judgment as well as a complete and unacceptable disregard of basic human values. For one of our tobacco companies to commission this study was not just a terrible mistake; it was wrong. All of us at Philip Morris, no matter where we work, are extremely sorry for this. No one benefits from the very real, serious, and significant diseases caused by smoking."

Between 1970 and 1995, per-capita cigarette consumption in poorer developing countries increased by 67 percent, while it dropped by 10 percent in the richer developed world. Eighty percent of smokers now live in less developed countries. By 2030, the World Health Organization (WHO) forecasts that 10 million people a year will die of smoking-related illness, making it the single biggest cause of death worldwide, with the largest increase being among women. WHO forecasts the 21st century's death rate from smoking to be ten times the 20th century's rate ("Washingtonian" magazine, December 2007).

The tobacco industry is one of the largest global enterprises. The six largest tobacco companies earned a combined profit of $35.1 billion (Jha et al., 2014) in 2010.

=== Ecological ===
Cigarette butts are a common source of litter. They contain high levels of nicotine, a toxin for most animals. Many animals, including infants, may ingest these butts, facing both the immediate threat of nicotine poisoning and the dangers associated with plastic ingestion. Furthermore, burning cigarette butts can cause wildfires. Disposing of cigarette butts in sewers can lead to clogged drains and subsequent flooding.

Tobacco farming also has negative environmental impacts. It contributes to deforestation, with approximately 5% of global deforestation linked to tobacco cultivation. An estimated one tree is lost for every 300 cigarettes produced. Deforestation leads to climate change, biodiversity loss, soil erosion, and water pollution. Additionally, tobacco farming requires large amounts of fertilizer, causing soil degradation and pollution. Some fertilizers contain radioactive materials that can be transferred to the lungs of smokers and those exposed to secondhand smoke. Tobacco farming also consumes significant water resources, exacerbating water shortages. The overuse of pesticides pollutes water sources, harms wildlife, and poses health risks to tobacco farmers, particularly in developing countries where safety knowledge may be lacking and child labor is prevalent. Tobacco production also releases substantial greenhouse gas emissions, contributing to climate change. Tobacco waste pollutes oceans, rivers, soil, and urban environments. In developing countries, tobacco farming raises food security concerns, as valuable water and farmland are used for tobacco instead of food crops. Overall, tobacco farming causes severe damage to both the environment and human health, necessitating measures to reduce its negative impacts.

=== Social ===
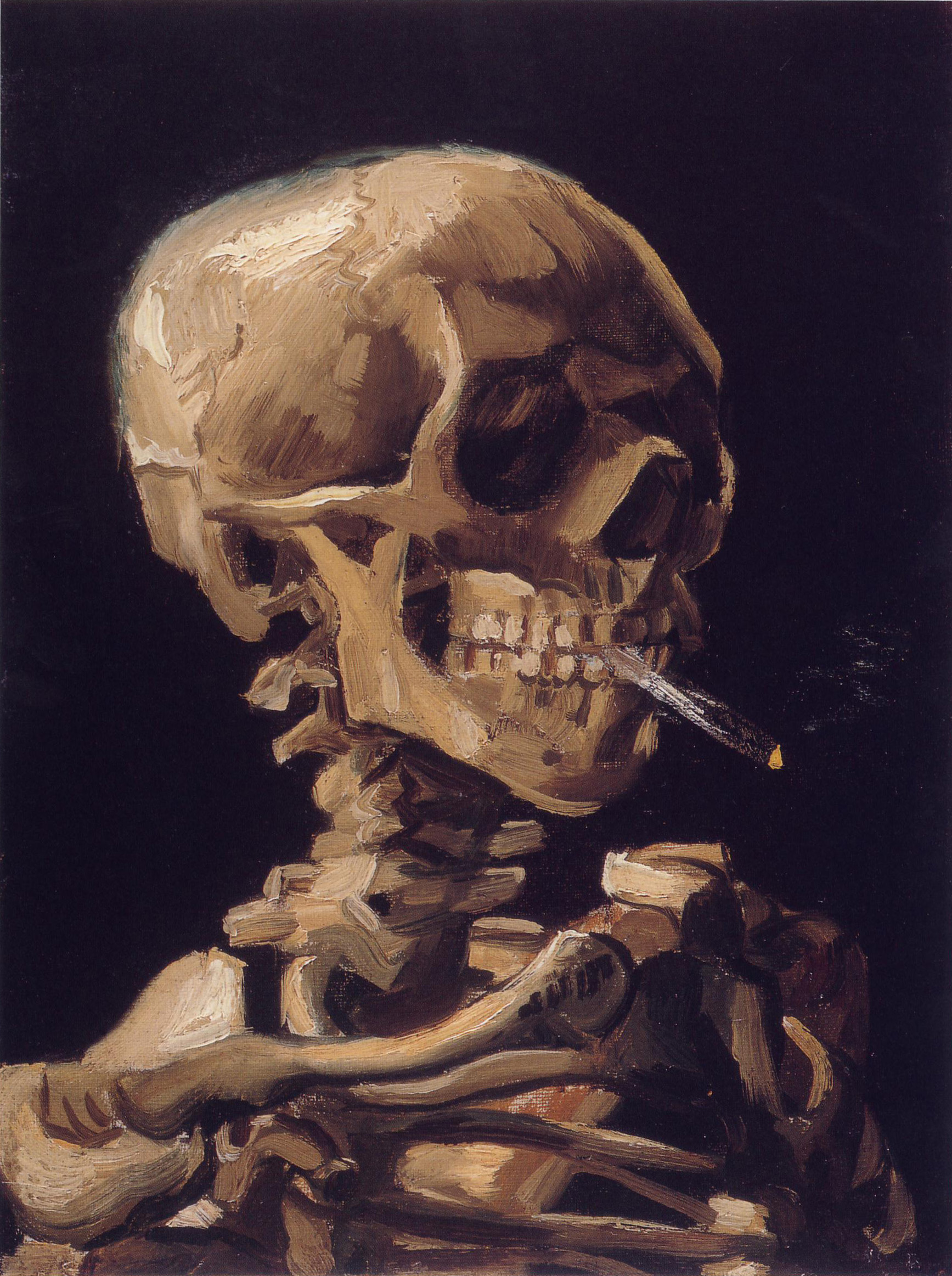
Skull with a burning cigarette, by Vincent van Gogh

Famous smokers of the past used cigarettes or pipes as part of their image, such as Jean-Paul Sartre's Gauloises-brand cigarettes; Albert Einstein's, Douglas MacArthur's, Bertrand Russell's, and Bing Crosby's pipes; or the news broadcaster Edward R. Murrow's cigarette. Writers in particular seem to be known for smoking, for example, Cornell Professor Richard Klein's book Cigarettes are Sublime for the analysis, by this professor of French literature, of the role smoking plays in 19th and 20th century letters. The popular author Kurt Vonnegut addressed his cigarette addiction in his novels. British Prime Minister Harold Wilson was well known for smoking a pipe in public as was Winston Churchill for his cigars. Sherlock Holmes, the fictional detective created by Sir Arthur Conan Doyle, smoked a pipe, cigarettes, and cigars. The DC Vertigo comic book character John Constantine, created by Alan Moore, is synonymous with smoking, so much so that the first storyline by Preacher creator Garth Ennis centered around John Constantine contracting lung cancer. Professional wrestler James Fullington, while in character as "The Sandman", is a chronic smoker to appear "tough".

The problem of smoking at home is challenging for women in many cultures (especially Arab cultures), where it may not be acceptable for a woman to ask her husband not to smoke at home or in the presence of her children. Studies have shown that pollution levels for smoking areas indoors are higher than levels found on busy roadways, in closed motor garages, and during firestorms. Furthermore, smoke can spread from one room to another, even if doors to the smoking area are closed.

The ceremonial smoking of tobacco and praying with a sacred pipe is a prominent part of the religious ceremonies of several Native American Nations. Sema, the Anishinaabe word for tobacco, is grown for ceremonial use and is considered the ultimate sacred plant since its smoke is believed to carry prayers to the spirits. In most major religions, however, tobacco smoking is not specifically prohibited, although it may be discouraged as an immoral habit. Before the health risks of smoking were identified through controlled studies, smoking was considered an immoral habit by certain Christian preachers and social reformers. The founder of the Latter Day Saint movement, Joseph Smith, recorded that on 27 February 1833, he received a revelation which discouraged tobacco use. This "Word of Wisdom" was later accepted as a commandment, and faithful Latter-day Saints abstain completely from tobacco. Jehovah's Witnesses base their stand against smoking on the Bible's command to "clean ourselves of every defilement of flesh" (2 Corinthians 7:1). The Jewish Rabbi Yisrael Meir Kagan (1838–1933) was one of the first Jewish authorities to speak out on smoking. In Ahmadiyya Islam, smoking is highly discouraged, although not forbidden. During the month of fasting however, it is forbidden to smoke tobacco. In the Baháʼí Faith, smoking tobacco is discouraged though not forbidden.

== Public policy ==
On 27 February 2005, the WHO Framework Convention on Tobacco Control took effect. The FCTC is the world's first public health treaty. Countries that sign on as parties agree to a set of common goals, minimum standards for tobacco control policy, and to cooperate in dealing with cross-border challenges such as cigarette smuggling. Currently, the WHO declares that 4 billion people will be covered by the treaty, which includes 168 signatories. Among other steps, signatories are to put together legislation that will eliminate secondhand smoke in indoor workplaces, public transport, indoor public places and, as appropriate, other public places.

=== Taxation ===
Tobacco taxation is the most effective tobacco control measure. It is used by many governments to generate revenue and reduce tobacco consumption. On average, a 10% price increase reduces cigarette consumption by 4–5%.

Its revenue can contribute to the general government budget and/or be used to cover health costs of tobacco smoking. The World Health Organization recommends a minimum 75% tax share of the retail price of tobacco, as a way of deterring cancer, cardiovascular diseases and other negative health outcomes.

=== Restrictions ===
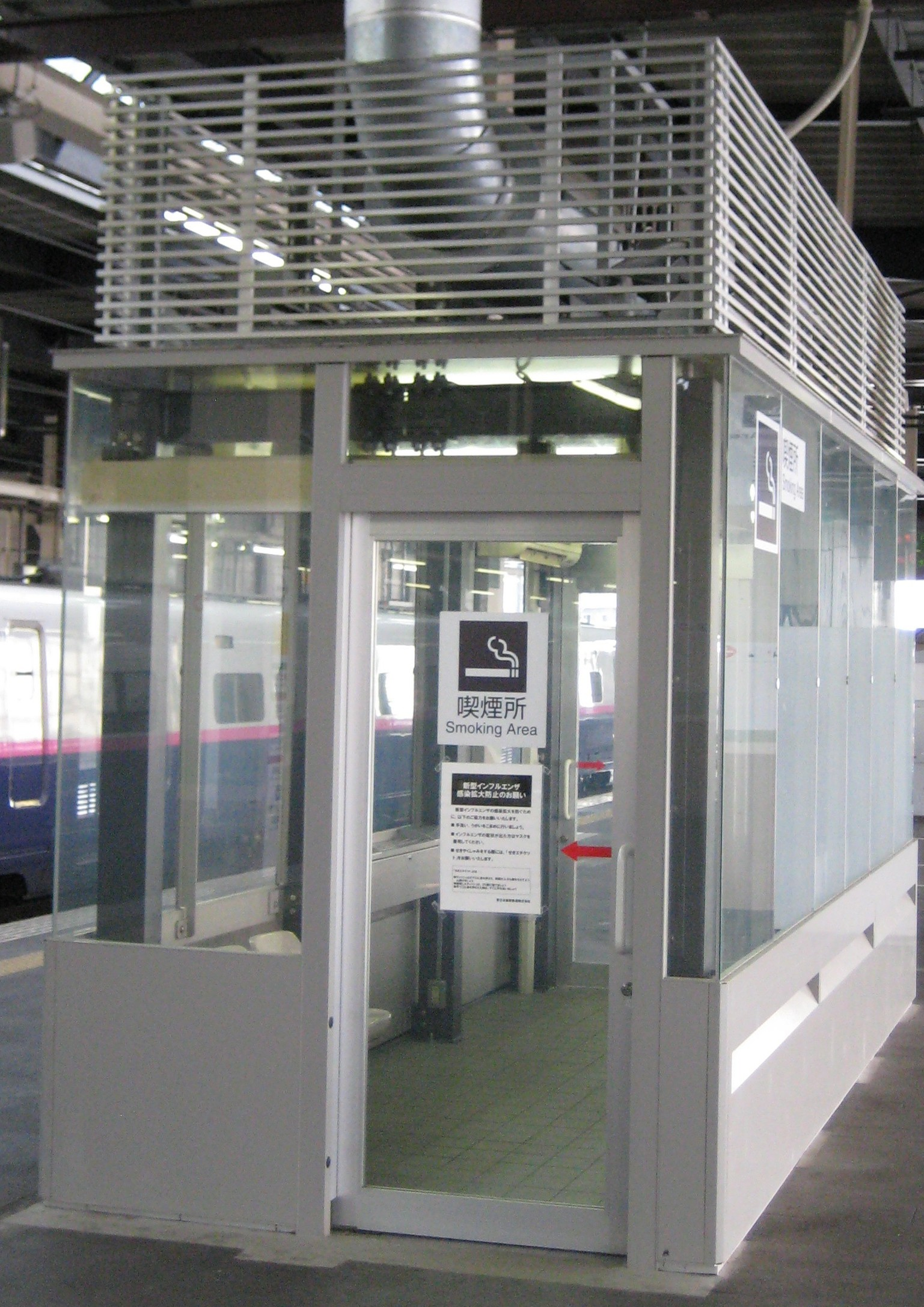
An enclosed smoking area in a Japanese train station. Notice the air vent on the roof.

In June 1967, the US Federal Communications Commission ruled that programs broadcast on a television station that discussed smoking and health were insufficient to offset the effects of paid advertisements that were broadcast for five to ten minutes each day. In April 1970, the US Congress passed the Public Health Cigarette Smoking Act banning the advertising of cigarettes on television and radio starting on 2 January 1971.

The Tobacco Advertising Prohibition Act 1992 expressly prohibited almost all forms of Tobacco advertising in Australia, including the sponsorship of sporting or other cultural events by cigarette brands.

All tobacco advertising and sponsorship on television has been banned within the European Union since 1991 under the Television Without Frontiers Directive (1989). This ban was extended by the Tobacco Advertising Directive, which took effect in July 2005 to cover other forms of media such as the internet, print media, and radio. The directive does not include advertising in cinemas and on billboards or using merchandising – or tobacco sponsorship of cultural and sporting events that are purely local, with participants coming from only one Member State as these fall outside the jurisdiction of the European Commission. However, most member states have transposed the directive with national laws that are wider in scope than the directive and cover local advertising. A 2008 European Commission report concluded that the directive had been successfully transposed into national law in all EU member states and that these laws were well implemented.

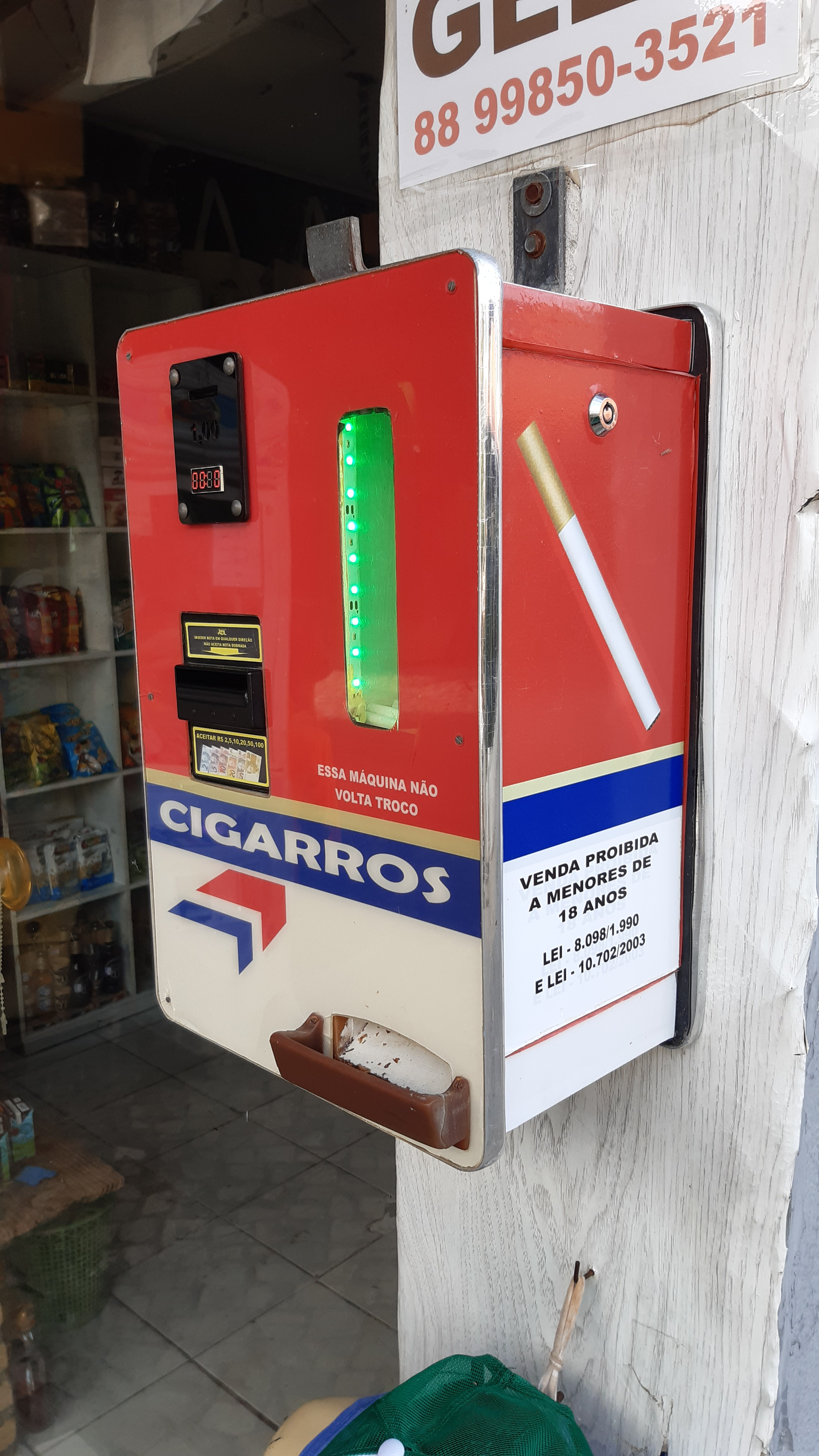
A cigarette dispenser in Canoa Quebrada, Brazil selling individual cigarettes for R$1 in 2024

Some countries also impose legal requirements on the packaging of tobacco products. For example, in the countries of the European Union, Turkey, Australia and South Africa, cigarette packs must be prominently labeled with the health risks associated with smoking. Canada, Australia, Thailand, Iceland and Brazil have also imposed labels upon cigarette packs warning smokers of the effects, and they include graphic images of the potential health effects of smoking. Cards are also inserted into cigarette packs in Canada. There are sixteen of them, and only one comes in a pack. They explain different methods of quitting smoking. Also, in the United Kingdom, there have been many graphic NHS advertisements, one showing a cigarette filled with fatty deposits as if the cigarette is symbolizing the artery of a smoker.

Some countries have also banned advertisements at the point of sale. The United Kingdom and Ireland have limited the advertisement of tobacco at retailers. This includes storing of cigarettes behind a covered shelf not visible to the public. They do, however, allow some limited advertising at retailers. Norway has a complete ban on point-of-sale advertising. This includes smoking products and accessories. Implementing these policies can be challenging; all of these countries experienced resistance and challenges from the tobacco industry. The World Health Organization recommends the complete ban of all types of advertisement or product placement, including at vending machines, at airports and on internet shops selling tobacco. The evidence is as yet unclear as to the effect of such bans.

Many countries have a smoking age. In many countries, including the United States, most European Union member states, New Zealand, Canada, South Africa, Israel, India, Brazil, Chile, Costa Rica and Australia, it is illegal to sell tobacco products to minors and in the Netherlands, Austria, Belgium, Denmark and South Africa it is illegal to sell tobacco products to people under the age of 18. On 1 September 2007 the minimum age to buy tobacco products in Germany rose from 16 to 18, as well as in the United Kingdom where on 1 October 2007 it rose from 16 to 18. Underlying such laws is the belief that people should make an informed decision regarding the risks of tobacco use. These laws have lax enforcement in some nations and states. In China, Turkey, and many other countries, a child has little problem buying tobacco products because they are often told to go to the store to buy tobacco for their parents.

Several countries such as Ireland, Latvia, Estonia, the Netherlands, Finland, Norway, Canada, Australia, Sweden, Portugal, Singapore, Italy, Indonesia, India, Lithuania, Chile, Spain, Iceland, United Kingdom, Slovenia, Turkey and Malta have legislated against smoking in public places, often including bars and restaurants. Restaurateurs have been permitted in some jurisdictions to build designated smoking areas (or to prohibit smoking). In the United States, many states prohibit smoking in restaurants, and some also prohibit smoking in bars. In provinces of Canada, smoking is illegal in indoor workplaces and public places, including bars and restaurants. As of 31 March 2008, Canada has introduced a smoke-free law in all public places, as well as within 10 meters of an entrance to any public place. In Australia, smoke-free laws vary from state to state. In New Zealand and Brazil, smoking is restricted in enclosed public places, including bars, restaurants, and pubs. Hong Kong restricted smoking on 1 January 2007 in the workplace, public spaces such as restaurants, karaoke rooms, buildings, and public parks (bars that do not admit minors were exempt until 2009). In Romania, smoking is illegal in trains, metro stations, public institutions (except where designated, usually outside), and public transport. In Germany, in addition to smoking bans in public buildings and transport, an anti-smoking ordinance for bars and restaurants was implemented in late 2007. A study by the University of Hamburg (Ahlfeldt and Maennig 2010) demonstrates that the smoking ban had, if any, only short-run effects on bar and restaurant revenues. In the medium and long run, no negative effect was measurable. The results suggest either that consumption in bars and restaurants is not affected by smoking bans in the long run or that negative revenue effects from smokers are compensated by increasing revenues from non-smokers.

=== Ignition safety ===
An indirect public health problem posed by cigarettes is that of accidental fires, usually linked with consumption of alcohol. The preliminary investigation into the fire at Wang Fuk Court in Hong Kong has determined that it was caused by a cigarette butt left behind from smoking.Enhanced combustion using nitrates was traditionally used, but cigarette manufacturers have been silent on this subject, claiming at first that a safe cigarette was technically impossible, then that it could only be achieved by modifying the paper. Roll-your-own cigarettes contain no additives and are fire-safe. Numerous fire safe cigarette designs have been proposed, some by tobacco companies themselves, which would extinguish a cigarette left unattended for more than a minute or two, thereby reducing the risk of fire. Among American tobacco companies, some have resisted this idea, while others have embraced it. RJ Reynolds was a leader in making prototypes of these cigarettes in 1983 and will make all of their U.S. market cigarettes fire-safe by 2010. Phillip Morris is not in active support of it. Lorillard (purchased by R. J. Reynolds), the United States' third-largest tobacco company, seems to be ambivalent.

=== Health warnings ===
Individual cigarettes in Canada now carry warnings such as "poison in every puff" and "cigarettes cause impotence" in what the government says is an effort to make it "virtually impossible to avoid health warnings altogether".

== Gateway drug theory ==
The relationship between tobacco and other drug use has been well-established. However, the nature of this association remains unclear. The two main theories are the phenotypic causation (gateway) model and the correlated liabilities model. The causation model argues that smoking is a primary influence on future drug use, while the correlated liabilities model argues that smoking and other drug use are predicated on genetic or environmental factors. One study published by the NIH found that tobacco use may be linked to cocaine addiction and marijuana use. The study stated that 90% of adults who used cocaine had smoked cigarettes before (this was for people ages 18–34). This study could support the gateway drug theory.

== Cessation ==
Quitting smoking often involves advice from physicians or social workers, cold turkey, nicotine replacement therapy, contingent vouchers, antidepressants, vaping, hypnosis, self-help (mindfulness meditation), and support groups.

In the United States, about 70% of smokers would like to quit smoking, and 50% report having attempted to do so in the past year. Without support, 1% of smokers will successfully quit smoking each year. Physician advice to quit smoking increases the rate to 3% per year. Adding first‐line smoking cessation medications (and some behavioral help), increased quit rates to around 20% of smokers in a year. For cessation of smoking, public participation in health campaigns are important.

== See also ==
- List of tobacco-related topics
- Cannabis smoking
- Cigarette smoking among college students
- Cigarette smoking for weight loss
- Electronic cigarette
- Herbal cigarette
- List of cigarette smoke carcinogens
- Snuff (tobacco)
- Smoker's paradox
- Tobacco advertising
- Tobacco control
- History of public health in the United States

== Bibliography ==
- Frieden, Thomas R. et al. The Health Consequences of Smoking: 50 Years of Progress: A Report of the Surgeon General (2014) online
- Gilman, Sander L.; Xun, Zhou (15 August 2004). Smoke: A Global History of Smoking. Reaktion Books. ISBN 978-1-86189-200-3.
- Goodman, Jordan, ed. Tobacco in History and Culture. An Encyclopedia (2 vol, Gage Cengage, 2005) online
- Hirschfelder, Arlene B. Encyclopedia of smoking and tobacco (1999) online
- Oreskes, Naomi, and Erik M. Conway. Merchants of doubt: How a handful of scientists obscured the truth on issues from tobacco smoke to global warming (Bloomsbury Publishing USA, 2011).
- Proctor, Robert N. (15 November 2000). The Nazi War on Cancer. Princeton University Press. ISBN 978-0-691-07051-3.
- World Health Organization (2008). The Global Burden of Disease 2004 Update (PDF). World Health Organization. ISBN 978-92-4-156371-0. Archived (PDF) from the original on 14 November 2008.
- World Health Organization (2008). WHO Report on the Global Tobacco Epidemic, 2008: the MPOWER package (PDF). World Health Organization. ISBN 978-92-4-159628-2. Archived from the original (PDF) on 7 February 2009.
