= Canadian Council for Tobacco Control =

Canadian charity

The Canadian Council for Tobacco Control (CCTC) is a registered Canadian charity. It formerly existed as the Canadian Council on Smoking and Health (CCSH). It was founded in 1974 by several non-governmental organizations "concerned with the tobacco epidemic", including the Canadian Cancer Society, the Heart and Stroke Foundation of Canada, and the Canadian Lung Association. It coordinates Canada's National Non-Smoking Week.

== See also ==
- Tobacco control
