= Kakizome =

Calligraphy term

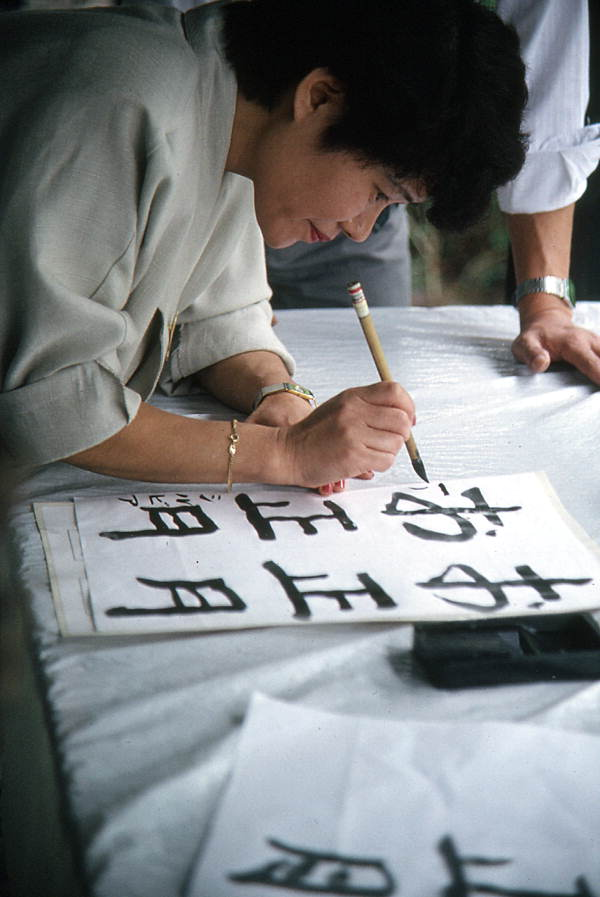
A Florida woman writing "New Year" (お正月)

Kakizome (書き初め, literally "first writing") is a Japanese term for the first calligraphy written at the beginning of a year, traditionally on January 2. Other terms include kissho (吉書), shihitsu (試筆) and hatsusuzuri (初硯).

Traditionally, kakizome was performed using ink rubbed with the first water drawn from the well on New Year's Day. Seated facing a favourable direction, people would write Chinese poetry containing auspicious words and phrases such as long life, spring, or perennial youth. These poems were then often burned.

In modern times, people often write out auspicious kanji rather than poems. School pupils up to senior high school are assigned kakizome as their winter holiday homework. Each year on January 5, several thousand calligraphers gather at the Nippon Budokan in Tokyo's Chiyoda-ku for a kakizome event that is widely covered by media.

The kakizome paper is usually burned on January 14 in the Sagicho festival. If the burning paper flies high, it is said that the person will be able to write a more fair hand.
