= Topi Diwas =

Nepali celebratory event

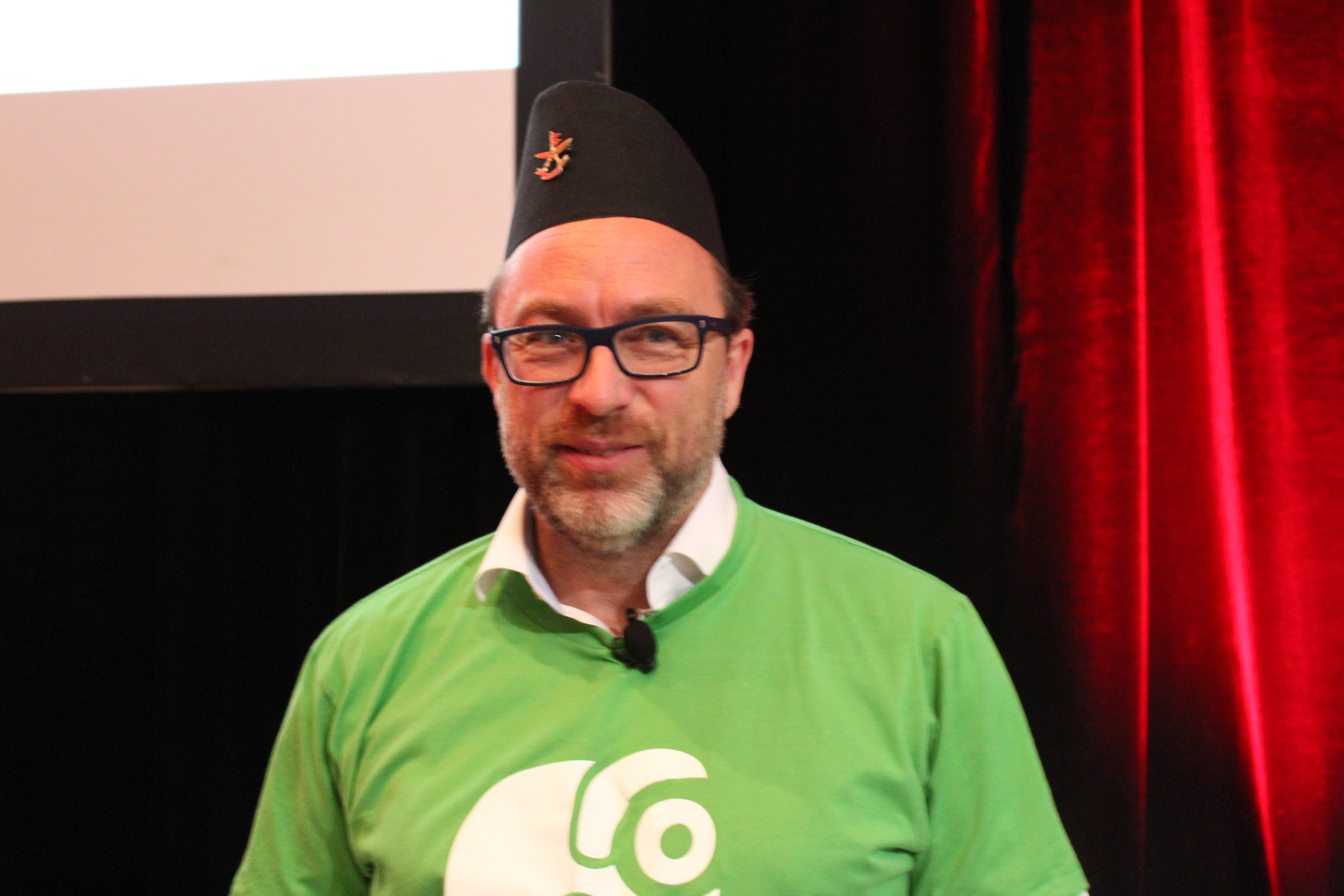
Wikipedia's co-founder Jimmy Wales wearing Bhaad-gaaule topi during closing ceremony of Wikimania-2015, at Mexico City, Mexico

Topi Diwas (Nepali: टोपी दिवस) from Northern Nepal, or Nepali Dhoti Day (Nepali: नेपाली धोती दिवस) from Southern Nepal, is an event celebrated by Nepali people globally on 1 January of English calendar, wearing Dhaka or Bhaad-gaaule topi as their pride.

Most Nepali people wear Dhaka topi and Bhaad-gaaule topi on the day.
