= Cigarettes Are Sublime =

1994 book

- Author: Richard Klein
- Publisher: Duke University Press
- Publication date: 1993

Cigarettes are Sublime is a 1993 book by Richard Klein published by Duke University Press. The author wrote it as therapy when he quit smoking. Klein states in the preface that the "book aims to be simultaneously a piece of literary criticism, an analysis of popular culture, a political harangue, a theoretical exercise, and an ode to cigarettes." The decisive encounter for the author, in terms of coming to terms with his own cigarette habit, came through reading the novel Zeno's Conscience by Italo Svevo.
