= National Non-Smoking Week =

Yearly health campaign in Canada

National Non-Smoking Week is a yearly event in Canada. Established in 1977, it continues to be observed on the third full week of January, starting on Sunday. Coordinated by the Canadian Council for Tobacco Control, it aims to:

- educate Canadians about the dangers of smoking;
- prevent people who do not smoke from beginning to smoke and becoming addicted to tobacco;
- help people quit smoking;
- promote the right of individuals to breathe air unpolluted by tobacco smoke;
- denormalize the tobacco industry, tobacco industry marketing practices, tobacco products, and tobacco use; and
- Assist in the attainment of a smoke-free society in Canada.

== Weedless Wednesday ==
The Wednesday of National Non-Smoking Week is termed Weedless Wednesday. Marijuana smokers are urged to refrain from smoking on this day. The intention is to kickstart the process of quitting smoking as well as gaining media coverage.

== See also ==
- Tobacco smoking
