= Man's Day and Woman's Day (Iceland) =

Traditional celebration days in Iceland

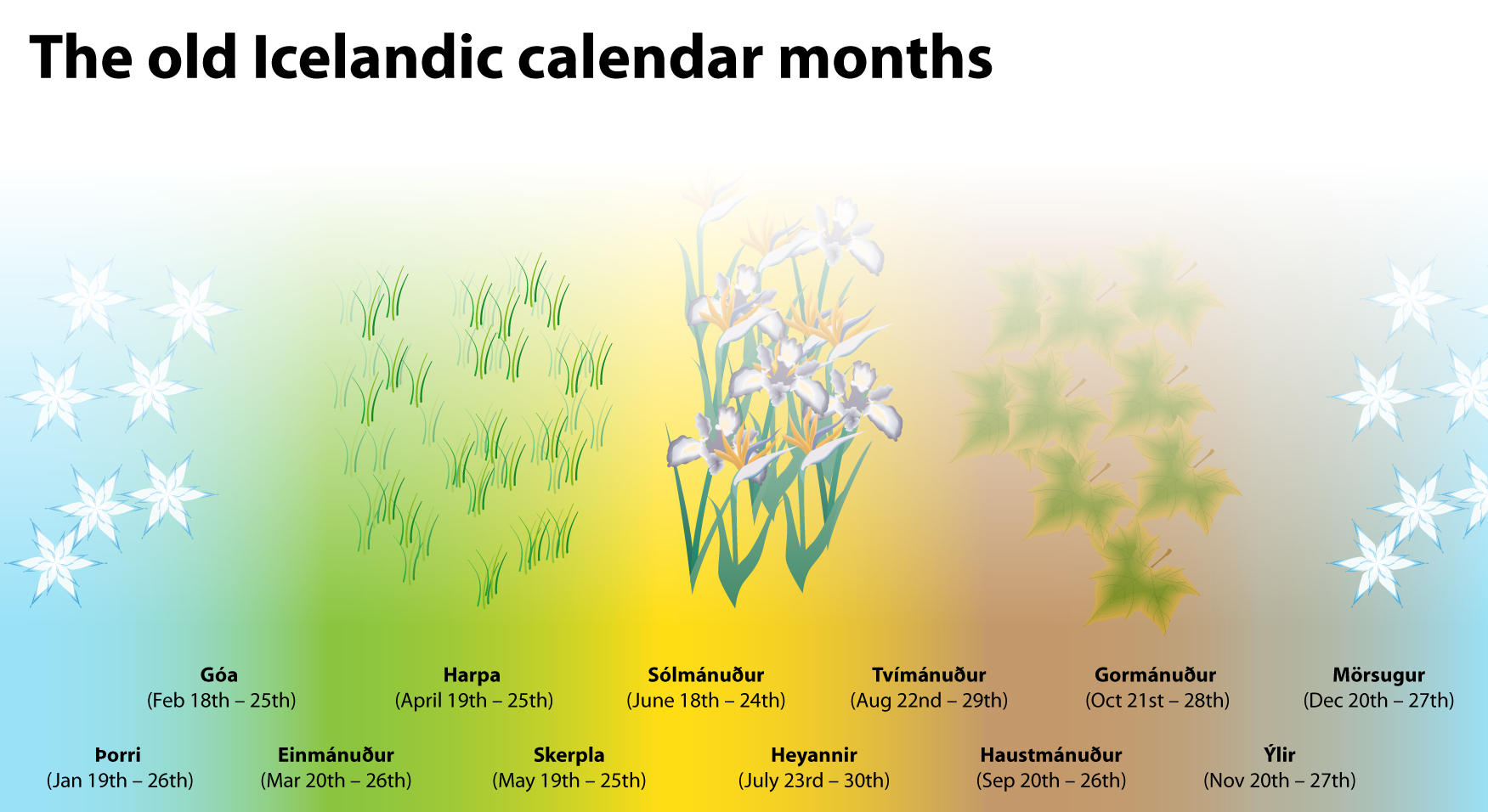
Old Icelandic calendar months

Man's Day and Woman's Day are traditional celebration days in Iceland, which were traditionally determined according to the old Icelandic calendar.

== Man's Day ==
Man's Day (Bóndadagur) fell on the first day in the month of Þorri according to the old Icelandic calendar. Man's Day was traditionally dedicated to the master of the house or farm, who was most often a working farmer. Bóndadagur in Icelandic means "Farmer’s day", and an early (generally considered humorous) reference to it was made in 1864 by Jón Árnason in his book Þjóðsögur (Folk Tales). According to Árnason, the master of the house should arise on the celebration day, put only one leg of his trousers and underwear on, and hop around outside calling men on neighboring farms to attend a feast to welcome the month of Þorri.

The first commercial advertisements referencing Man's Day's appeared in the 1970s. In contemporary Icelandic culture, women commemorate Man's Day by giving their men special attention or a small gift. In many Icelandic homes, it is traditional for women to cook the Icelandic smoked lamb called hangikjöt.

== Woman's Day ==
Woman's Day (Konudagur) falls on the first day of Góa according to the old Icelandic calendar. Woman's Day was traditionally dedicated to the lady of the house or farm (the wife). The first references to it were made by Ingibjörg Schulesen, a sheriff's wife in Húsavík in the period between 1841 and 1861. Today, men commemorate Woman's Day by giving flowers or gifts to significant women in their lives (roughly equivalent to Valentine's Day in other countries).
