= National Science Fiction Day =

Unofficial observance, 2 January

- Date: 2 January
- Next time: 2 January 2027
- Frequency: Annual

National Science Fiction Day is unofficially celebrated by many science fiction fans in the United States on January 2, which corresponds with the official birthdate of famed science fiction writer Isaac Asimov.

While not a federally-recognized holiday, National Science Fiction Day is recognized by organizations such as the Hallmark Channel and by the Scholastic Corporation. It is also listed in the National Day Calendar.

== See also ==
- 3 Ways to Celebrate National Science Fiction Day in the Classroom
