= Johnny Jump Up =

Johnny Jump Up can refer to:

- A number of species of violet (Viola sp.) flower, including:
  - Viola bicolor, also known as the American field pansy
  - Viola cornuta, also known as the tufted pansy
  - Viola pedunculata also known as the California golden violet
  - Viola tricolor, also known as heartsease
- A local name for the blue-black grassquit bird
- Johnny Jump Up (song), an Irish folk song about strong cider
