= Jugend Eine Welt =

Non-profit organization promoting aid to youth

Jugend Eine Welt - Don Bosco Action Austria
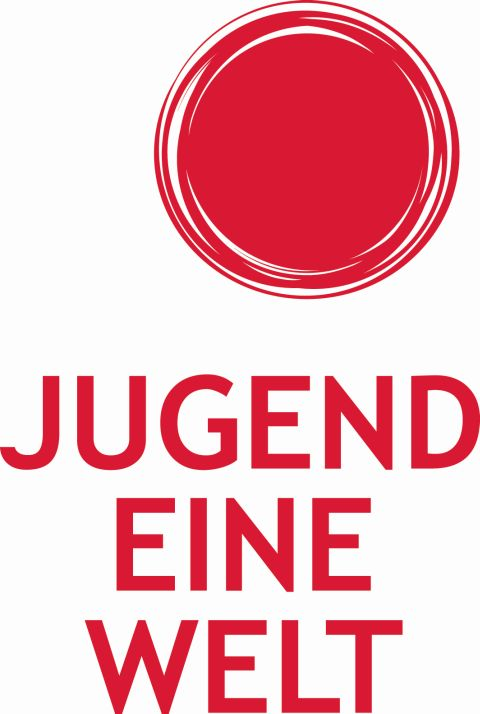
- Logo von Jugend Eine Welt – Don Bosco Aktion Österreich
- Founded: 1997
- Type: Non-profit; NGO
- Headquarters: Vienna, Austria
- Location: Austria
- Services: The organisation´s objective is the encouragement of the holistic development of children and young people and nurtures them with the philosophy of Don Bosco.
- Key people: Reinhard Heiserer (chairman)
- Website: www.jugendeinewelt.at

The non-profit organisation Jugend Eine Welt – Don Bosco Aktion Austria was founded at the inaugural meeting on 28 June 1997. Following a reorganisation in January 2007 it has been called Jugend Eine Welt – Don Bosco Aktion Österreich. Jugend Eine Welt Austria pursues the objectives of promoting aid to youth both nationally and internationally and sustainable development cooperation.

Jugend Eine Welt Austria was one of the first Austrian organisations to be awarded the stamp of quality for charities, receiving it on 14 November 2001. Ever since it has been entitled to carry the stamp without interruption.

== The Mission ==
- encourage development, education and emergency relief projects
- raise awareness in Austria
- enable young people from Austria to do voluntary service
- collect donations, a contribution for development, education and emergency relief projects

== Street Children's Day ==
2009 marked the 75th anniversary of the canonisation of John Bosco, the "Father and Teacher of Youth". To mark the anniversary, Jugend Eine Welt launched Street Children's Day the same year. The "Street Children's Day" is commemorated every year on the January 31st and should highlight the situation of these children and young people and raise funds for projects run by the Salesians of Don Bosco and the Salesian Sisters of Don Bosco in favour of street children worldwide. A „Street Children‘s Day“ information package is sent to parishes, interested teachers and youth groups at the beginning of January. The package included material for a service for children, general background information on the subject of street children and suggestions for campaigns. This material is also available online (in German). Since the first Street Children's Day in 2009 it gained more and more attention in Austrian media, especially in 2011 when the auxiliary bishop of Vienna Franz Scharl cleaned shoes on the streets to commemorate the day.
