= Typing Day =

Annual event in Malaysia

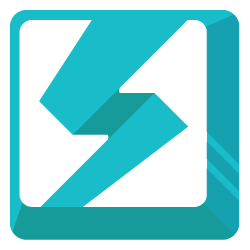
- Observed by: Junior Chamber International
- Date: 8 January
- Next time: 8 January 2027
- Frequency: annual
- Related to: Reading Day

Typing Day (also known as International Typing Day or World Typing Day) is an annual event that falls on 8 January in Malaysia. It is co-organized by the STC (Speed Typing Contest) Team from JCI (Junior Chamber International) Mines and Team TAC (Typo Auto Corrector) to promote speed, accuracy and efficiency in written communication among the public.

== Origin ==
Typing Day was conceptualized in Malaysia and falls yearly on 8 January. It was first celebrated in 2011 and aims to encourage people to express themselves via written communication and also in commemoration of the Malaysian Speed Typing Contest 2011, which broke two records in the Malaysian Book of Records (MBR) i.e. the Fastest Typist and the Largest Participation for a Typing Event. Typing Day was originally conceived by Team TAC (Typo Auto Corrector), which consist of Jay Chong Yen Jye, Nicholas Koay Zhen Lin and Edwin Khong Wai Howe, the winner of the MSC Malaysia-IHL Business Plan Competition (MIBPC) 2010/2011's Business Plan Category. With the aspiration to encourage everyday people especially the younger generation to type and learn proper English, Team TAC has designed and developed the SecondKey, a computer program that automatically corrects wrong English spellings in virtually any online and offline type-written interface (i.e. social network sites, word processing programs, etc.) Working closely together with Microsoft Malaysia, the software is currently being improved and expanded beyond the English language; with various add on features to enhance typing accuracy and efficiency.

Typing Day is held on 8 January because it is one week after new years where everyone will have the time to think through and plan what they want to do for the following days and write it down on this day. For example, documents and ideas like resolution of the past year, vision, mission and objective for this year, compilations of ideas, opinions of the previous years etc. can be produced and shared with others.
