= Jump-up Day =

Annual observance in Montserrat

- Official name: Jump-up Day
- Observed by: people of Montserrat
- Date: January 1(every year)
- Frequency: Annual

Jump-up Day is a holiday celebrated on January 1 in Montserrat. It commemorates the emancipation of the slaves of Montserrat, and is the last day of Carnival on the island. Jump-up Day incorporates steelbands and masquerades, as well as male dancers chosen for their large size, who dance encumbered by chains to represent slavery.
