= Simon Cowling =

British Anglican priest

Simon Charles Cowling (born 1959) has been Dean of Wakefield since 2018.

== Education ==
Cowling was educated at Gonville and Caius College, Cambridge, King's College London and Lincoln Theological College. He was a teacher until his ordination in 1992.

== Ministry ==
He served curacies at St Martin, Potternewton, Leeds from 1991 to 1994 and at St Chad, Far Headingley, Leeds from 1994 to 1996; and was Vicar at St Edmund King and Martyr, Roundhay from 1996 to 2007. He was Area Dean of Allerton from 2004 to 2007; Canon Residentiary and Precentor of Sheffield Cathedral from 2007 to 2013; and Rector of Bolton Priory from 2013 until his appointment as dean. He has announced his intention to retire on 31 July 2025.

Church of England titles
Preceded by Jonathan Greener	Dean of Wakefield; 2018–	Succeeded by Incumbent
