= Jonathan Draper =

Anglican priest (born 1952)

The Very Reverend Jonathan Draper
- Dean of Exeter
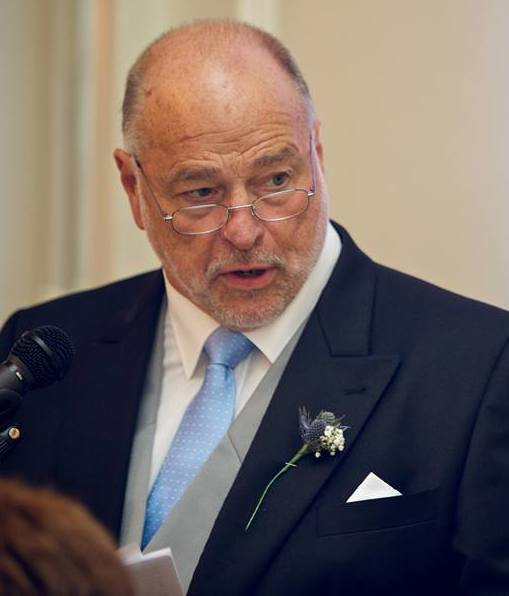
- Draper delivering a sermon at a wedding in 2018
- Church: Church of England
- Diocese: Diocese of Exeter
- In office: 3 March 2012 – 3 July 2017
- Predecessor: Jonathan Meyrick
- Other posts: General Secretary of Modern Church (2017–present); Canon Theologian, York Minster (2000–2012)

Orders
- Ordination: 1983 (deacon); 1984 (priest)

Personal details
- Born: 27 February 1952 (age 74) Boston, Massachusetts, United States
- Denomination: Anglican
- Spouse: Maggie (m. 1979)
- Children: Three
- Profession: Clergyman and theologian
- Education: Gordon College, Massachusetts; St John's College, Durham

Jonathan Lee Draper (born 27 February 1952) is an American Anglican priest, theologian, and academic. Since 2017, he has been the general secretary of Modern Church. From 2012 to 2017, he was the dean of Exeter, at Exeter Cathedral in the Church of England Diocese of Exeter.

== Early life and education ==
Draper was born on 27 February 1952 in Boston, Massachusetts, USA. He was educated at Plainfield High School, New Jersey. He studied at Gordon College, a Christian liberal arts college in Wenham, Massachusetts, and graduated with a Bachelor of Arts (BA) degree in 1976. He then moved to England, and studied at St John's College, Durham. He graduated from the University of Durham with a further BA degree in 1978.

Draper entered Ripon College Cuddesdon, an Anglican theological college near Oxford, to train for ordination. He completed his training in 1983. During this time, he also studied for a Doctor of Philosophy (PhD) degree at St John's College, Durham, which he completed in 1984. His doctoral thesis was titled "The place of the Bible in the theology of Albrecht Ritschl with special reference to Christology and the Kingdom of God".

== Ordained ministry ==
Draper was ordained in the Church of England as a deacon in 1983 and as a priest in 1984. From 1983 to 1985, he served his curacy at St John the Divine, Brooklands, in the Diocese of Manchester. Between 1985 and 1992, he was director of academic studies at Ripon College Cuddesdon, an Anglican theological college where he himself trained for ordination. He also worked as a lecturer in theology at the University of Oxford.

In 1992, Draper returned to parish ministry and served as the vicar of Putney; this parish consists of St. Mary's Church, Putney and All Saints' Church, Putney Common in the Diocese of Southwark. He was also involved in providing continuing ministerial education for clergy and lay ministers of the Kingston Episcopal Area. In 2000, he moved to the Diocese of York where he had been appointed the canon theologian (a canon residentiary) of York Cathedral.

On 15 December 2011, it was announced that Draper would be the next dean of Exeter in the Diocese of Exeter. The dean is the head of the chapter of Exeter Cathedral, and the most senior priest in the diocese. He was installed as dean during Easter 2012. He retired from full-time ordained ministry in August 2017.

== Later life ==
In July 2017, it was announced that Draper would be the next general secretary of Modern Church, a liberal Christian charity. He took up the part-time post on 1 September 2017.

== Personal life ==
Draper met Maggie, his future wife, while studying at Durham University; they married in 1979. Together they have three children.

== Selected works ==
- Draper, Jonathan, ed. (1988). Communion and episcopacy. Oxford: Ripon College Cuddesdon. ISBN 978-0951361108.
- Draper, Jonathan (2003). To love and serve: being the body of Christ in a time of change. London: SPCK. ISBN 978-0281055401.
- Kim, Sebastian C. H.; Draper, Jonathan, eds. (2008). Liberating texts?: sacred scriptures in public life. London: SPCK. ISBN 978-0281058563.
- Kim, Sebastian C. H.; Draper, Jonathan, eds. (2011). Christianity and the renewal of nature: creation, climate change and human responsibility. London: SPCK. ISBN 978-0281063314.

== Styles ==
- 1952–1983: Mr Jonathan Draper
- 1983–1984: The Reverend Jonathan Draper
- 1984–2000: The Reverend Dr Jonathan Draper
- 2000–2012: The Reverend Canon Dr Jonathan Draper
- 2012–present: The Very Reverend Dr Jonathan Draper

Church of England titles
Preceded by Jonathan Meyrick	Dean of Exeter; 2012–2017	Succeeded by Jonathan Greener
