= Church of St John the Divine, Brooklands =

Coordinates: 53.409231°N 2.318678°W

Church of St John the Divine
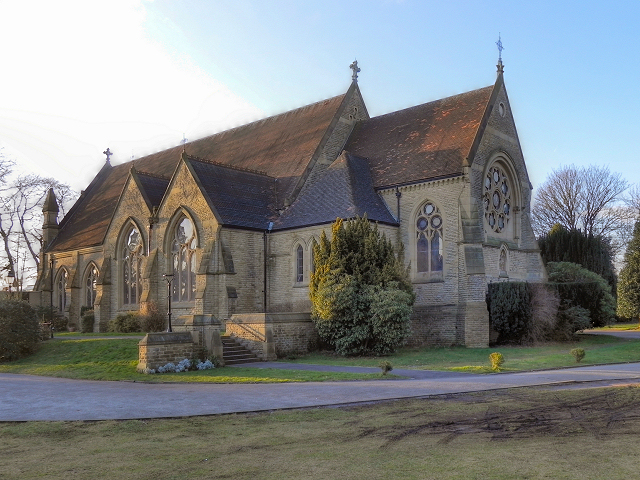
- Church of St John the Divine
- OS grid reference: SJ 78913 90316
- Location: Brooklands Road, Brooklands, Sale, Greater Manchester, M33 3PB
- Country: England
- Denomination: Church of England
- Website: Church website

History
- Status: Active
- Dedication: St John the Divine

Architecture
- Functional status: Parish church
- Heritage designation: Grade II*
- Designated: 3 October 1974
- Architect: Alfred Waterhouse
- Style: Gothic Revival
- Years built: 1864–1868

Administration
- Diocese: Diocese of Manchester
- Archdeaconry: Archdeaconry of Manchester
- Deanery: Manchester South and Stretford
- Parish: St John, Baguley

Clergy
- Vicar: In Vacancy

The Church of St John the Divine is a Church of England parish church in Brooklands, Sale, Greater Manchester. The church is a grade II* listed building.

== History ==
The church was built from 1864 to 1868. It was the first Anglican church designed by Alfred Waterhouse, who had previously only worked on secular buildings. It is in the Gothic Revival style and is made of coursed sandstone rubble with a red tiled roof.

In 1897, a stained glass window designed by Morris & Co. was added to the south nave. In 1907, an Arts and Crafts wrought-iron chancel screen designed by Henry Wilson was added.

On 3 October 1974, the church was designated a grade II* listed building.

== Present day ==
The Parish of St. John, Baguley is in the Archdeaconry of Manchester in the Diocese of Manchester. The main Sunday morning service is a Family Communion.

== Notable clergy ==
- Jonathan Draper, later Dean of Exeter, served his curacy here
- Stephen Cherry, later Dean of King's College, Cambridge, served his curacy here.

=== List of vicars ===
- 1868–1875: Thomas Brooke
- 1876–1912: Hugh Bethell Jones
- 1912–1938: Cyril Bethell Jones
- 1938–1947: J. E. Williams
- 1947–1964: Geoffrey Newton Barker
- 1964–1979: Ernest Buckley
- 1980–1991: Alan Wolstencroft
- 1991–1998: John Findon
- 1999–2012: Ian McVeety
- 2013–2015: Bryan Hackett
- 2017–2025: Richard Sherratt

== See also ==
- Grade II* listed buildings in Greater Manchester
- Listed buildings in Sale, Greater Manchester
