= John Allen (provost of Wakefield) =

Anglican priest (1932–2015)

The Very Reverend John Allen
- Provost of Wakefield
- Diocese: Diocese of Wakefield
- In office: 1982–1997
- Predecessor: John Lister
- Successor: George Nairn-Briggs

Orders
- Ordination: 1968 (deacon); 1969 (priest)

Personal details
- Born: John Edward Allen; 9 June 1932 Rusholme, Lancashire, England
- Died: 9 September 2015 (aged 83)
- Education: Rugby School
- Alma mater: University College, Oxford; Fitzwilliam College, Cambridge

John Edward Allen (9 June 1932 – 9 September 2015) was an Anglican priest in the 20th century. He was Provost of Wakefield from 1982 to 1997.

== Early life ==
Allen was born on 9 June 1932 in Rusholme, Lancashire (now in Greater Manchester). His father was Ronald Edward Taylor Allen, a canon and sometime Vicar of Edgbaston. He was educated at Rugby School, then an all-boys public school. He studied at University College, Oxford, and graduated with a Bachelor of Arts (BA) degree in 1956.

== Early career ==
Allen was in the Colonial Service in Kenya from 1957 to 1963. After Kenya's independence, he moved to a career in business. He worked in Sales and Marketing with Kimberly-Clark until 1966.

Having become unsatisfied with his business career, Allen felt the call to ordination. In 1966, he entered Westcott House, Cambridge, an Anglican theological college. For two years he trained at Westcott and additionally studied theology at Fitzwilliam College, Cambridge. By 1968, he had completed his training and graduated from the University of Cambridge with a Bachelor of Arts (BA) degree.

== Ordained ministry ==
Allen was ordained in the Church of England as a deacon in 1968 and as a priest in 1969. He was initially a Curate at Deal and then Vicar of St Paul’s, Clifton. He was then the incumbent at Chippenham until 1982 when he became Provost of Wakefield, a post he held until 1997.

Allen's churchmanship was described as liberal Catholic in his Church Times obituary.

He died on 9 September 2015 at the age of 83.

Church of England titles
Preceded by John Lister	Provost of Wakefield; 1982 – 1997	Succeeded by George Nairn-Briggs
