= Susanna Parr =

- Born: maybe 1630 or before
- Died: after 1659
- Writing career
- Subject: Protest

Susanna Parr (fl. 1650–1659) was a religious writer in Exeter, Devon, England. She protested when her former minister tried to pressurise her after she attended another church. Her former minister said she was excommunicated and this was all documented in six pamphlets by Parr.

== Life ==
Parr's birth date, birthplace and birth name are unknown. One estimate is that was born in 1630 or before, as it is known that she married a Mr Parr and she had one child. She attended church services in Exeter Cathedral in 1650. This was an independent group that was not associated with the cathedral's hierarchy. The group employed its own minister, Lewis Stucley, in 1650 after it was decided that he would be better than Mr Hanmer. The church and her attendance proceeded for the next four years but in 1654 Parr became discontented. She decided that this group were not the "true church" and she decided to attend Presbyterian services organised by another minister Thomas Ford.

Lewis Stucley became concerned and he sent people to ask Parr if she would return to his church. She would not, and Stucley accused her of "contention" and he held public meetings to highlight her behaviour.

In 1657 her non attendance at her former church was highlighted again by the case of Mary Allein. Allein was a member of Stucley's church and she objected when a petition was circulated at the church. The petition concerned an objection to Oliver Cromwell and Allein's objection was not about the detail of the petition, but she felt that a petition concerning secular affairs should not be circulated during a religious meeting. Allein and her husband decided to leave Stucley's church. Stucley and the church decided to threaten to excommunicate Allein and they added Parr's name into their action. They were asked to answer these charges.

Allein's husband, Toby, non attendance was not raised, so it was Parr and Allein who wrote a reply to the congregation. Stucley refused to read the reply and moved to proclaim their excommunication. Parr's reply was theological and rational and it ran to 114 pages. Toby Allein also published a defence and Stucley also published a reply.

Parr's life after this is not known.
