= Noel Hopkins =

Noel Thomas Hopkins (3 January 1892 – 26 July 1969) was an Anglican priest in the mid 20th century.
He was and educated at Archbishop Holgate's School and Clare College, Cambridge. He was ordained in 1915 and was initially a Curate in Whitby. He was a Chaplain to the British Armed Forces during World War I. He had been interviewed by the Chaplain-General in April, 1917 who described him as ‘Nervous, slight stutter, charming fellow’ and noted his experience ‘In charge of slum church for tenement people; charge of workhouse 2 years; Hospital (Cottage) 9 months’. Impressed, the Chaplain-General sent him to Eastern Command for a year and then to France. Unfortunately, Hopkins’ health broke down, and he spent weeks in hospital with several problems including pharyngitis and influenza. He was, however, fit to transfer to the RAF in 1918, and was demobilised the following year. When peace returned he became Chaplain at Ripon College Cuddesdon. From 1925 to 1933 he was Sacrist of St Paul's Cathedral when he was appointed Provost of Wakefield, a post he held for nearly three decades.
He died on 26 July 1969

Church of England titles
Preceded by William Arthur MacLeod	Provost of Wakefield; 1933 – 1962	Succeeded by Philip Norris Pare
