= Dean of Wakefield =

Church of England senior clergy member

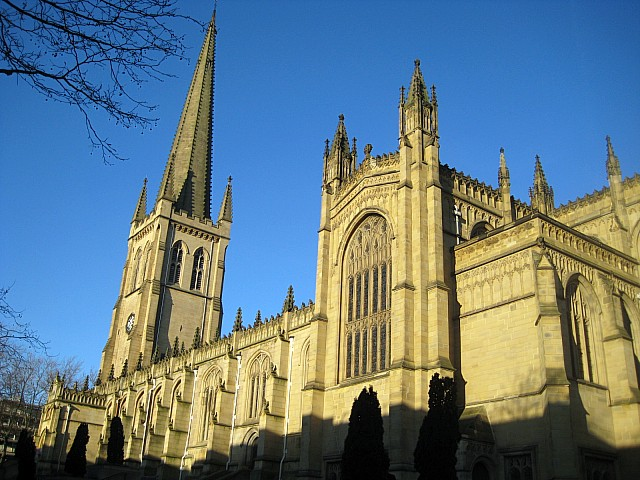
Wakefield Cathedral

The Dean of Wakefield is the head (primus inter pares – first among equals) and chair of the chapter of canons, the ruling body of Wakefield Cathedral. The dean and chapter are based at the Cathedral Church of All Saints Wakefield. Before 2000 the post was designated as a provost, which was then the equivalent of a dean at most English cathedrals. The cathedral is one of three co-equal mother churches of the Diocese of Leeds and a seat of the Bishop of Leeds. The most recent dean was Simon Cowling.

== List of provosts and deans ==
=== Provosts ===
- 1931–1932 William MacLeod
- 1933–1962 Noel Hopkins
- 1962–1971 Philip Pare
- 1972–1982 John Lister
- 1982–1997 John Allen
- 1997–2000 George Nairn-Briggs (became Dean)

=== Deans ===
- 2000–2007 George Nairn-Briggs
- 2007 – 26 November 2017 Jonathan Greener (became Dean of Exeter)
- 2017–2018 (Acting) Tony Macpherson, Sub Dean & Canon Pastor
- 29 September 2018 – 31 July 2025 Simon Cowling

== Sources ==
- “Who was Who” 1897-2007 London, A & C Black, 2007 ISBN 978-0-19-954087-7
- The Times, Thursday, Nov 10, 1932; pg. 1; Issue 46287; col A Death of the first Provost of Wakefield
- Photo of Jonathan Greener
- Cathedral web-site
