= Henry de Raleigh (died 1301) =

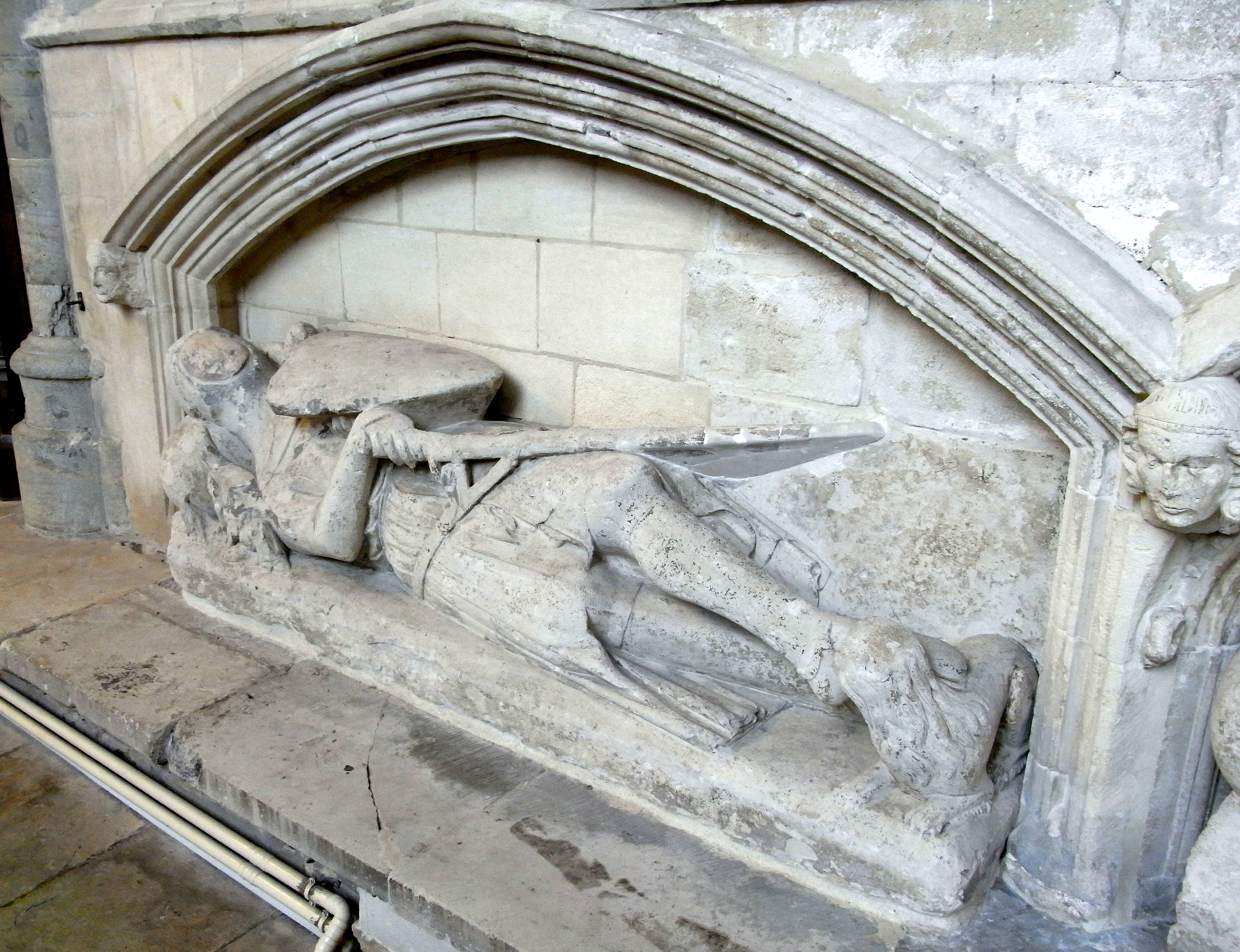
Effigy commonly supposed to represent Henry de Raleigh (d.1301), the westernmost of an adjacent pair of so-called "crusader" effigies, north wall of south choir aisle/ambulatory, Exeter Cathedral

Chequy or and gules, a chief vair, the arms of Raleigh of Raleigh Pilton, later adopted by Chichester

Sir Henry de Raleigh (died 1301) was a knight from Devonshire, England, whose effigy in the form of a cross-legged crusader knight survives in Exeter Cathedral.

== Origins ==
The place of his origin is unclear from surviving records, but he was probably a member of the prominent de Raleigh family seated at the manor of Raleigh in the parish of Pilton, near Barnstaple in North Devon. In the 16th century the arms of Checquy a chief vair were recorded by the antiquarian John Leland as painted on the shield of his effigy in Exeter Cathedral. These arms were later adopted by the prominent Chichester family, the heirs of de Raleigh of Raleigh, Pilton.

== Death and burial ==
He is known to have died whilst living at the Dominican Friary in Exeter, whence his body was forcibly removed by two Cathedral canons, including Walter de Stapledon (d.1326), later Bishop of Exeter, and given burial in the cathedral.

== Monument in Exeter Cathedral ==
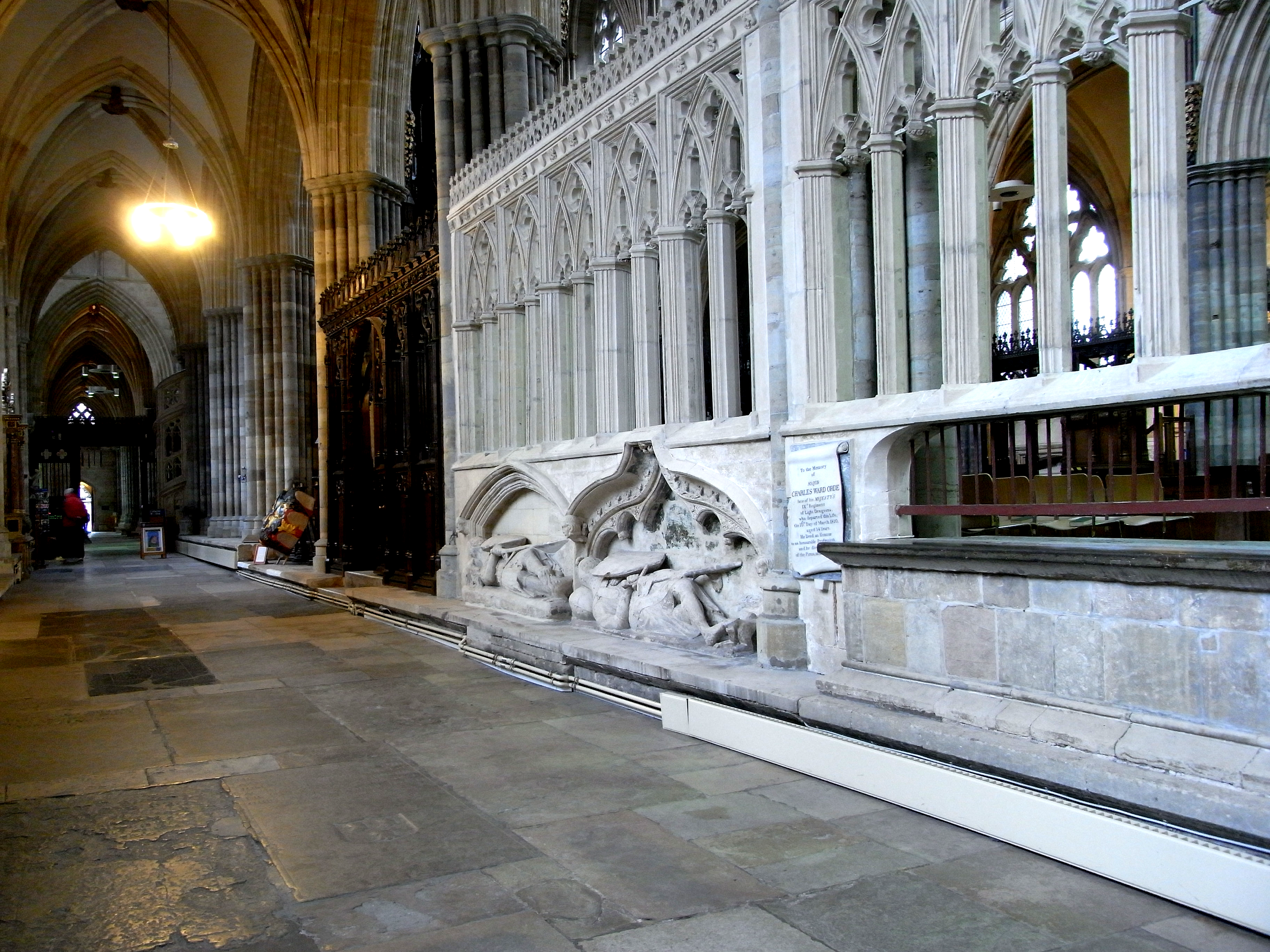
Cross-legged effigies of two knights, believed to represent Sir Henry de Raleigh (d.1301), left, and Sir Humphrey de Bohun, order uncertain. South choir aisle/ambulatory, Exeter Cathedral, looking westwards

The Devon historian Sir William Pole (d.1635) wrote concerning Exeter Cathedral:

"Twoe knightes lye together in the wall w^{ch} devideth the quire & ye ambulatory, the on(e) w^{th} the armes of Bohun on his shield & ye other w^{th} the armes of Ralegh of Ralegh: vid. Checque, or & geules a chief verry".

It is not certain which of the two contemporary effigies of cross-legged knights situated next to each other under separate niches set into the north wall of the south ambulatory of Exeter Cathedral represents Raleigh. Orme (2008) is one of the few commentators who has attempted to decide the matter, and he selected the westernmost (left-hand) effigy, under the arched canopy, as representing Raleigh, thus assigning de Bohun to the easternmost effigy, under the ogee-shaped canopy.

== Sources ==
- Orme, Nicholas, "Whose Body?", published in "The Cathedral Cat, Stories from Exeter Cathedral", 2008, p. 25
