= George Nairn-Briggs =

George Peter Nairn-Briggs (born 5 July 1945) was a provost then the dean of Wakefield. (Note: In 2000 all provosts were redesignated deans.)

He was born on 5 July 1945 and educated at Slough Technical High School and began his working life in local authority housing after which he was a press officer for MAFF. From 1966 he began to study for the priesthood, firstly at King's College London and then at St Augustine's College, Canterbury. He held curacies at St Laurence, Catford and then St Saviour, Raynes Park. After this he was Vicar of Christ the King, Salfords and then St Peter, St Helier (Bishop Andrewes) in Morden. He was the Bishop of Wakefield’s Advisor for Social Responsibility between 1987 and 1997, and a Canon Residentiary at Wakefield Cathedral from 1992. He was then promoted to lead the staff at the Cathedral Church of All Saints, his job title (if not his role) changing in 2000.

He is also the author of several books. (Note: Amongst others he has written Love in Action, 1986; Serving Two Masters, 1988; and It Happens in the Family, 1992.)

== Notes ==
Church of England titles
Preceded by John Edward Allen	Provost, then Dean of Wakefield; 1997–2007	Succeeded by Jonathan Desmond Francis Greener
