= Exeter Cathedral =

Anglican cathedral in Devon, England

- Cathedral Church of Saint Peter in Exeter
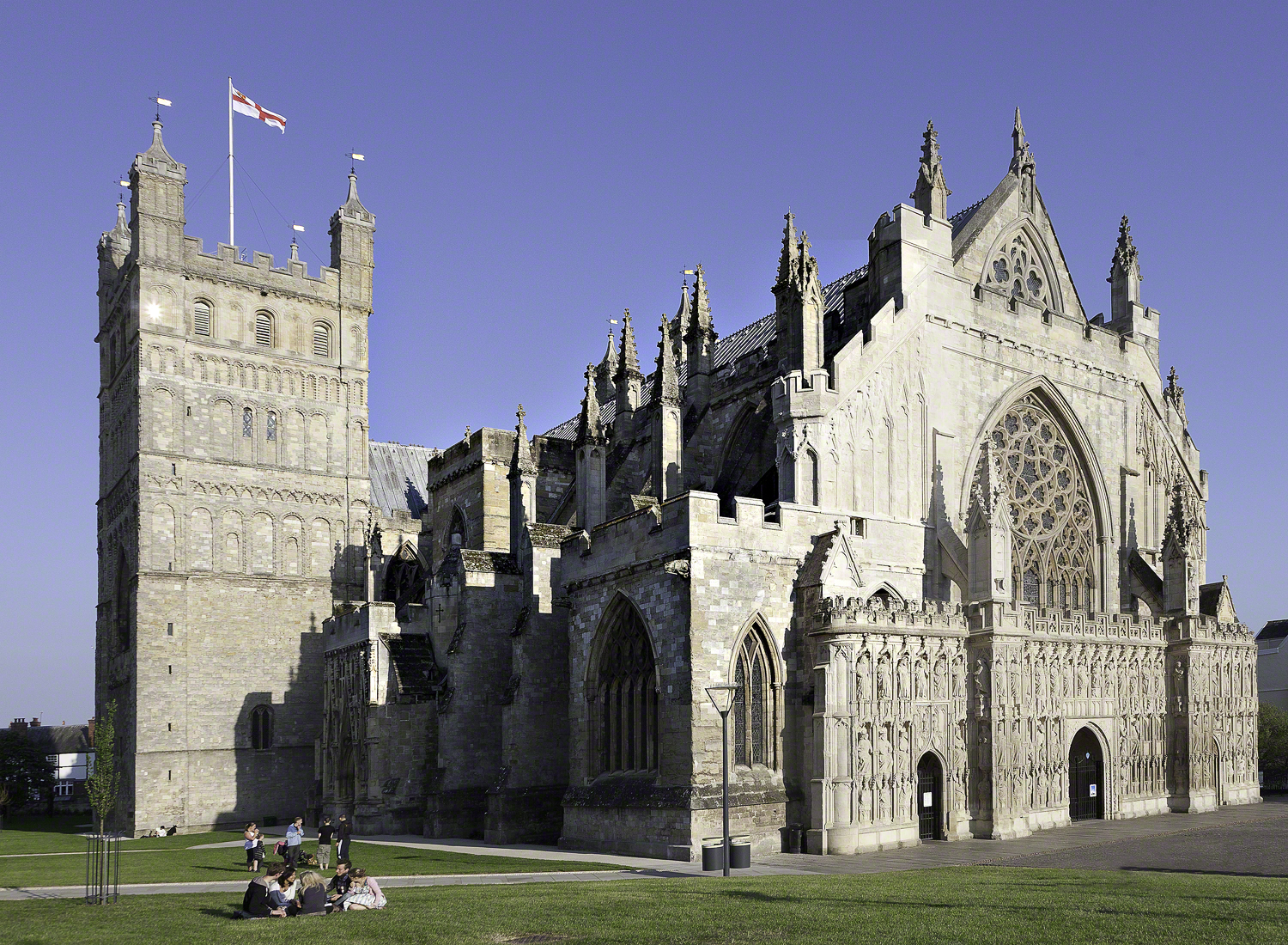

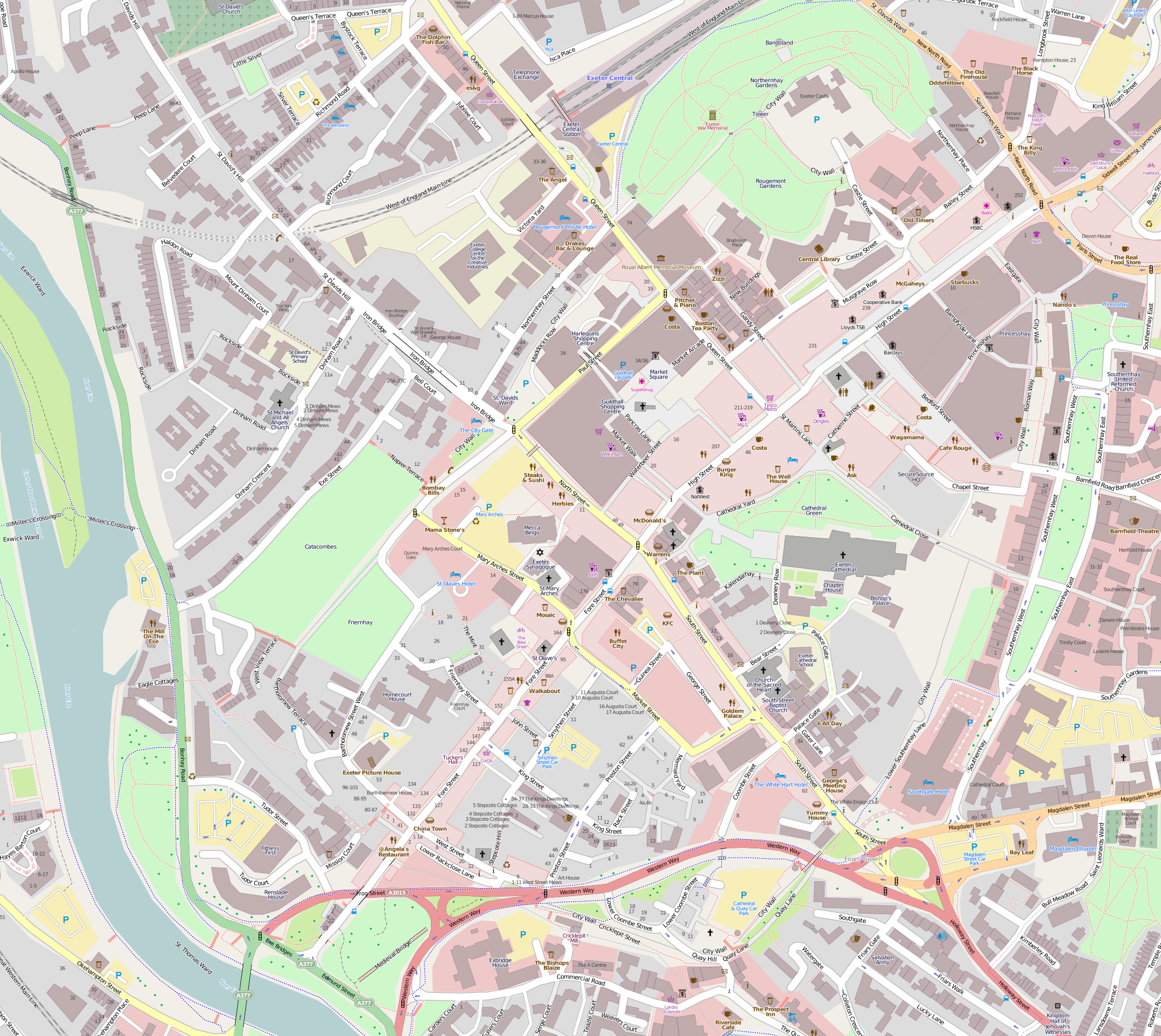
- Shown within Exeter
- 50°43′21″N 03°31′47″W
- OS grid reference: SX 92115 92550
- Location: Exeter, Devon
- Country: England
- Denomination: Church of England
- Previous denomination: Roman Catholic
- Tradition: Anglo-Catholic
- Website: www.exeter-cathedral.org.uk

Architecture
- Functional status: Active
- Previous cathedrals: 2
- Style: Norman, Gothic
- Years built: 1112–1400

Specifications
- Length: 383 feet (117 m)

Administration
- Province: Canterbury
- Diocese: Exeter

Clergy
- Bishop: Mike Harrison (bishop)
- Dean: Jonathan Greener

Exeter Cathedral, properly known as the Cathedral Church of Saint Peter in Exeter, is an Anglican cathedral, and the seat of the Bishop of Exeter, in the city of Exeter, Devon, in South West England. The present building was complete by about 1400 and has several notable features, including an early set of misericords, an astronomical clock and the longest uninterrupted medieval stone vaulted ceiling in the world.

== History ==
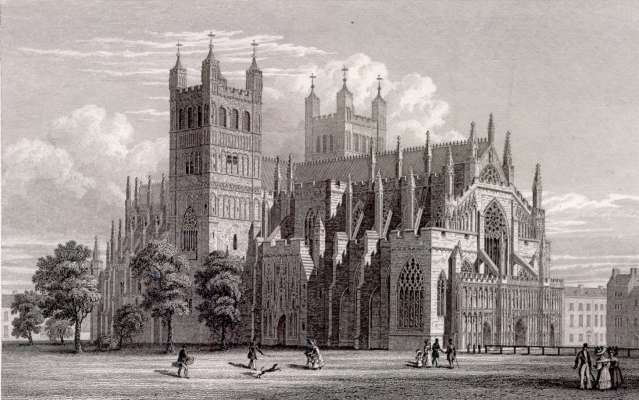
The cathedral in 1830

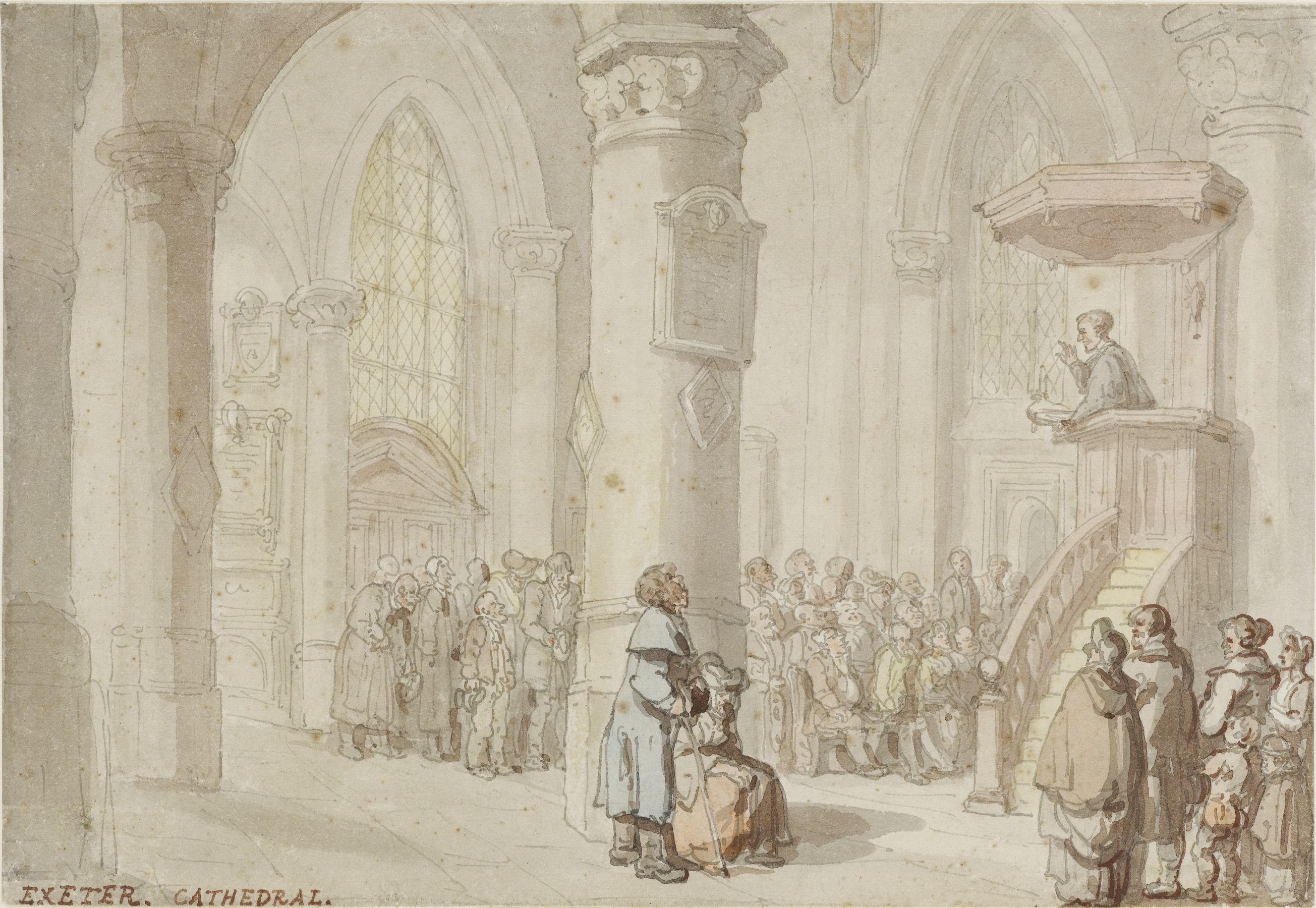
Watercolour painting of A Sermon in Exeter Cathedral by Thomas Rowlandson from the Georgian Era

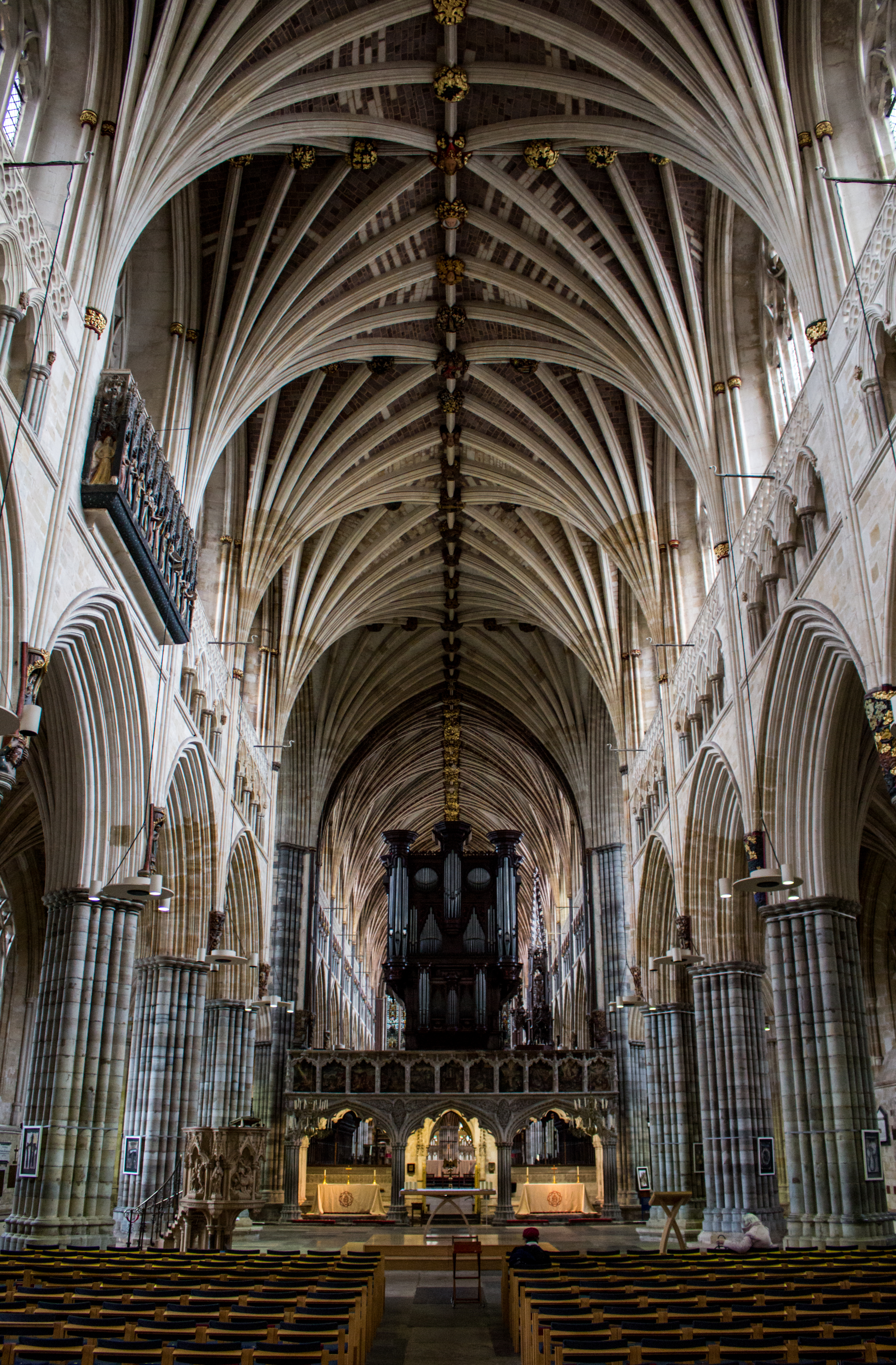
Inside the cathedral, showing the vaulted ceiling – the longest uninterrupted medieval vaulted ceiling in the world

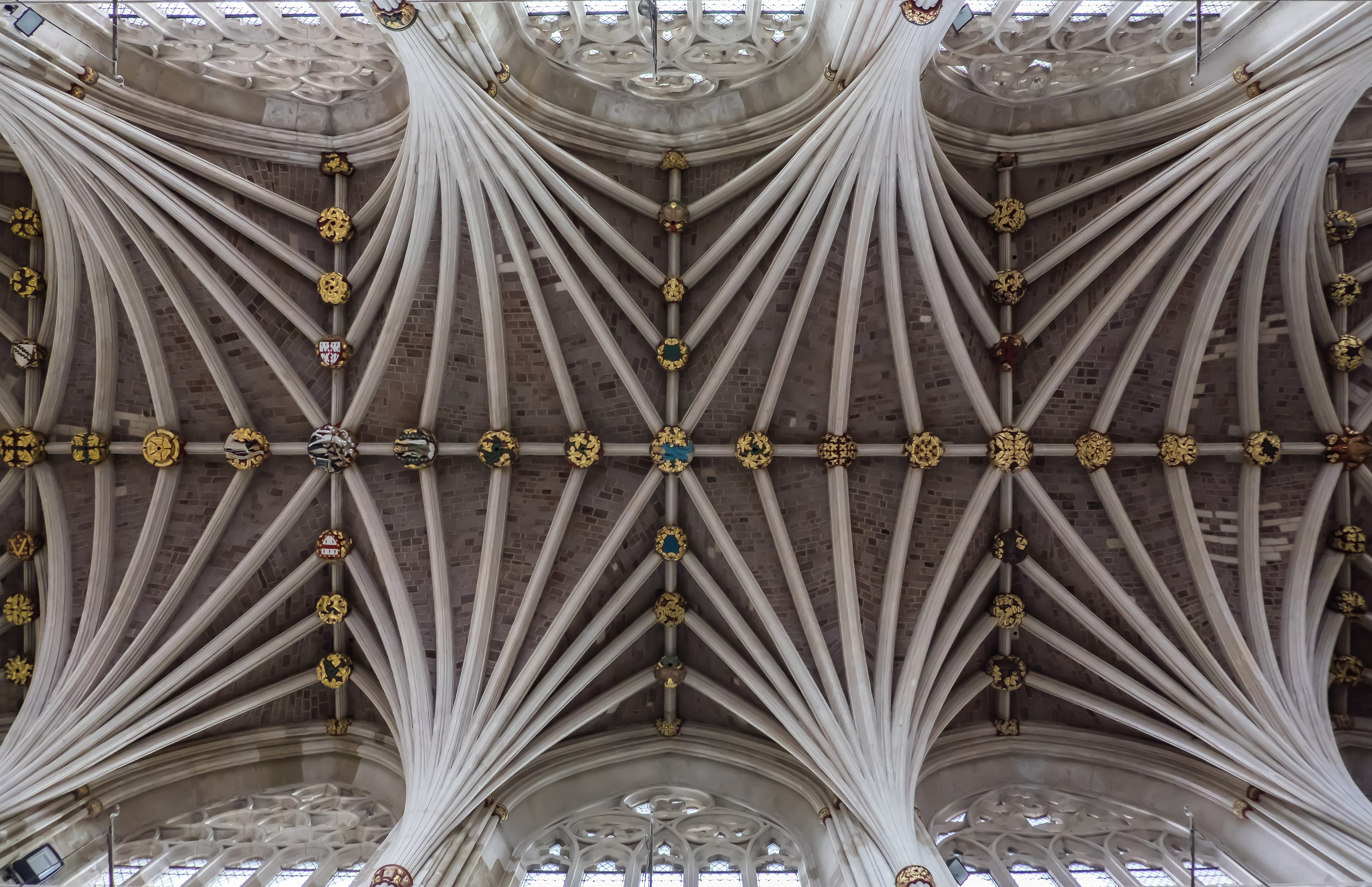
Detail of the vaulted ceiling

The site where Exeter Cathedral was constructed was home to Roman buildings. A legionary fortress was constructed between 50 and 75 AD. A Roman bathhouse was discovered in 1971.

The founding of the cathedral at Exeter, dedicated to Saint Peter, dates from 1050, when the seat of the bishop of Devon and Cornwall was transferred from Crediton because of a fear of sea-raids. A Saxon minster already existing within the town (and dedicated to Saint Mary and Saint Peter) was used by Leofric as his seat.

In 1107 William Warelwast was appointed to the see, and this was the catalyst for the building of a new cathedral in the Norman style. Its official foundation was in 1133, during Warelwast's time, but it took many more years to complete. Following the appointment of Walter Bronescombe as bishop in 1258, the building was already recognised as outmoded, and it was rebuilt in the Decorated Gothic style, following the example of Salisbury. However, much of the Norman building was kept, including the two massive square towers and part of the walls. It was constructed entirely of local stone, including Purbeck Marble. The new cathedral was complete by about 1400, apart from the addition of the chapter house and chantry chapels.

Like most English cathedrals, Exeter suffered during the dissolution of the monasteries, but not as much as it would have done had it been a monastic foundation. Further damage was done during the Civil War, when the cloisters were destroyed. Following the restoration of Charles II, a new pipe organ was built in the cathedral by John Loosemore. Charles II's sister Henrietta Anne of England was baptised here in 1644. In 1650 an independent church was meeting in the cathedral and this small church caused upset when the minister "excommunicated" Susanna Parr.

During the Victorian era, some refurbishment was carried out by George Gilbert Scott. As a boy, the composer Matthew Locke was trained in the choir of Exeter Cathedral, under Edward Gibbons, the brother of Orlando Gibbons. His name can be found scribed into the stone organ screen.

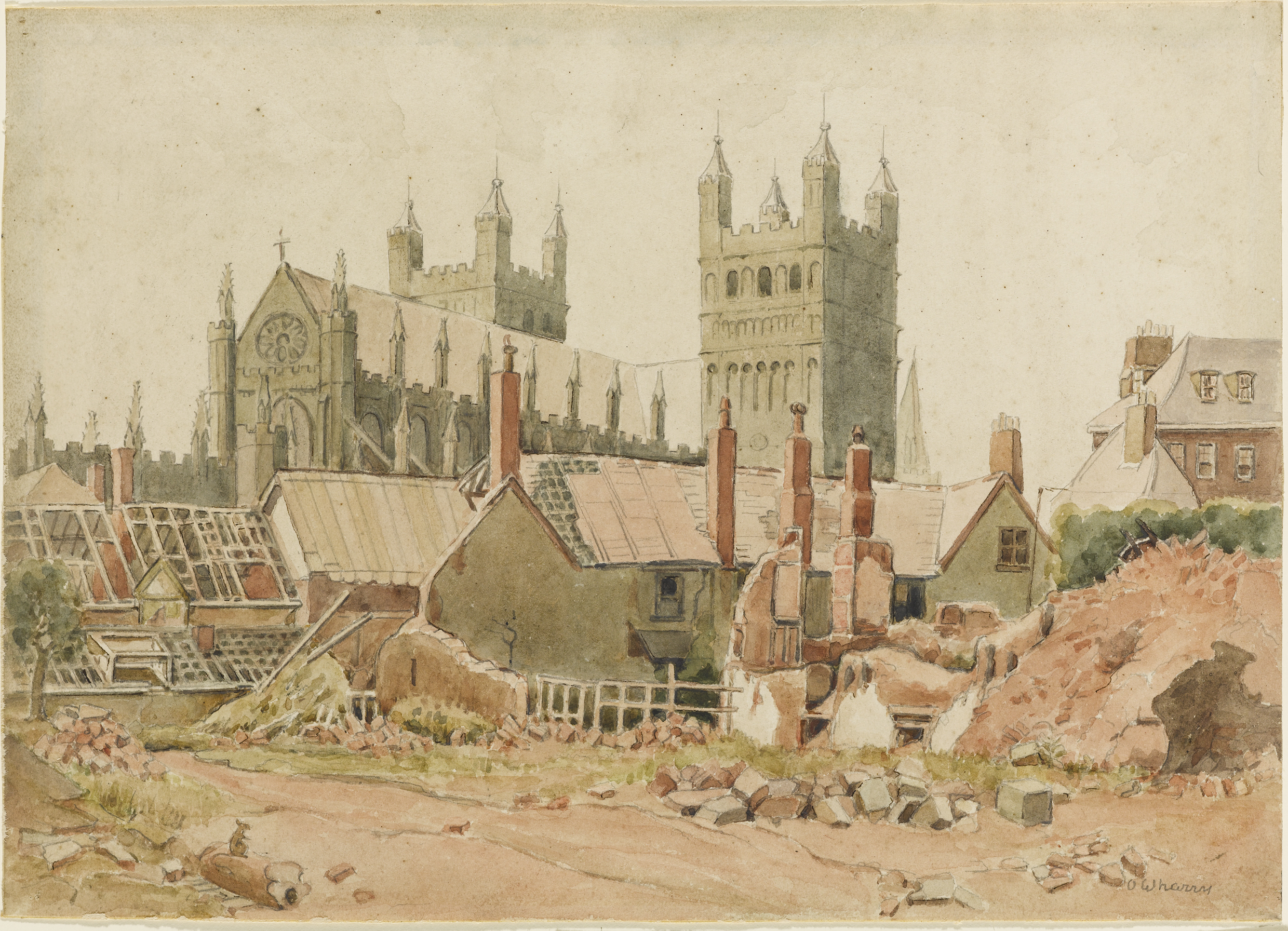
Exeter Cathedral after the Blitz – Olive Wharry – 63-2004-5

During the Second World War, Exeter was one of the targets of a German air offensive against British cities of cultural and historical importance, which became known as the "Baedeker Blitz". On 4 May 1942 an early-morning air raid took place over Exeter. The cathedral sustained a direct hit by a large high-explosive bomb on the chapel of St James, completely demolishing it. The muniment room above, three bays of the aisle and two flying buttresses were also destroyed in the blast. The medieval wooden screen opposite the chapel was smashed into many pieces by the blast, but it has been reconstructed and restored. Many of the cathedral's most important artefacts, such as the ancient glass (including the great east window), the misericords, the bishop's throne, the Exeter Book, the ancient charters (of King Athelstan and Edward the Confessor) and other precious documents from the library had been removed in anticipation of such an attack. The precious effigy of Walter Branscombe had been protected by sand bags.

In July 2023, The Methodist Recorder reported that the cathedral chapter signed a sharing agreement between it and Mint Methodist Exeter for shared use of the Lady Chapel.

== Architecture ==
Flag of Exeter Cathedral since 2014, flown from the North Tower all year round

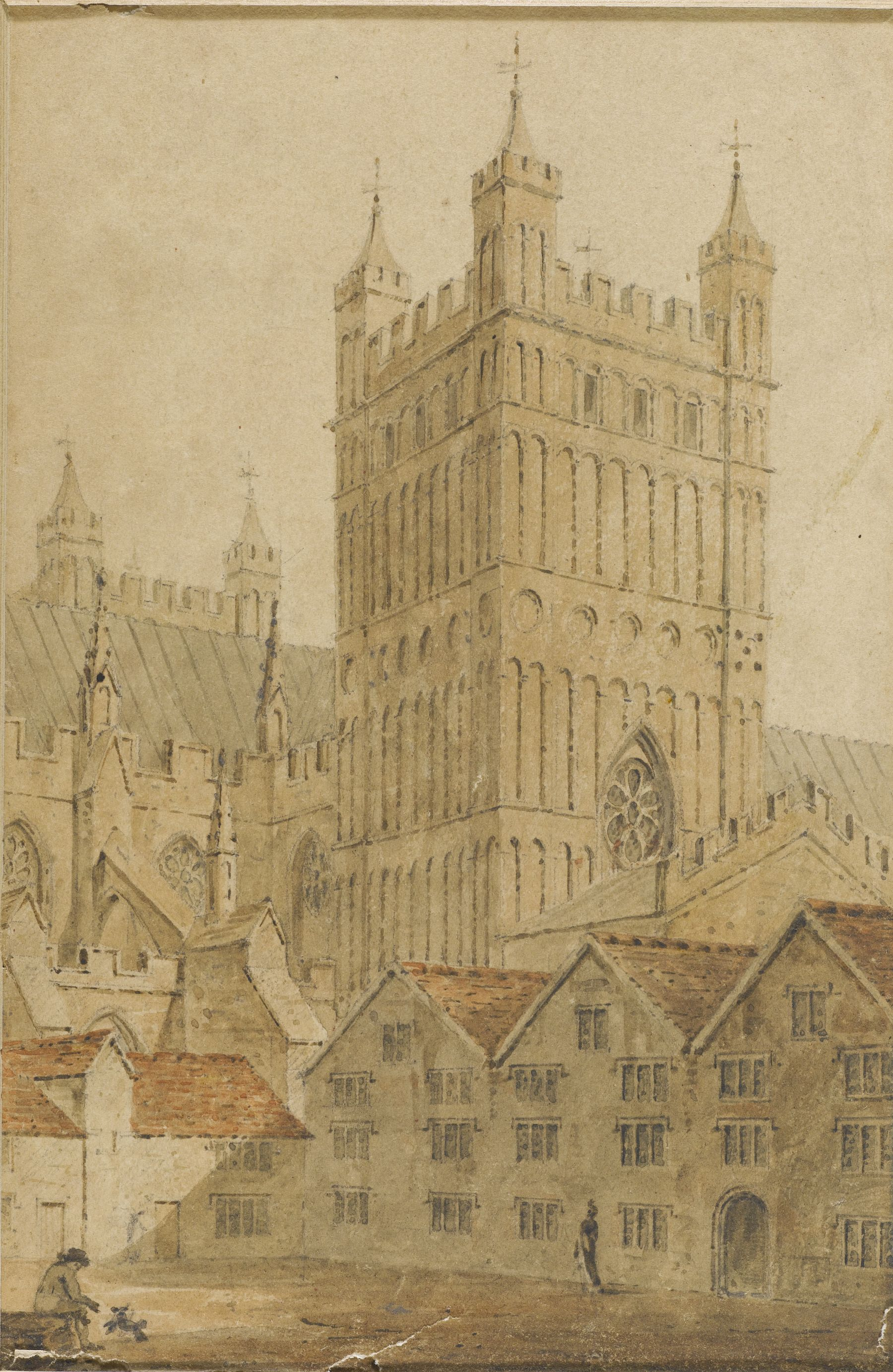
'South Tower of Exeter Cathedral', attributed to W. Davey, about 1800–1830

The Norman cathedral construction began in 1112, presumably at the east end and was consecrated in 1133, by which date the choir, transept and first two bays of the nave were probably complete. As detailed above, remains of the Norman building can be seen in the massive transept towers. By 1160 the nave and west front were complete, and a cloister and chapter house were added between 1180 and 1244.

During the 1270s, a new project began to replace the entire east end, starting with the east end chapels. This work is documented by a very extensive series of fabric rolls. Work advanced slowly, with the retrochoir, presbytery and choir being built in the 1290s. The original choir elevation had two storeys, but was later modified to three, presumably after the arrival of Master Roger in 1297. Master Thomas of Witney was engaged in 1316 to design the choir furnishings, then became master mason and stayed at Exeter until 1342.

By 1328 the church was complete to the first two bays of the nave, where a design change in the vaults is visible. During Master Thomas of Witney's time the east cloister walk was begun (1318–25) and the nave, west front and north cloister walk were probably completed (c.1328–42). That the present west front is on the same site as the Norman predecessor is indicated by the narrowing of the nave bays towards the west, squeezed to meet an existing feature.

The image screen across the west facade and the chantry chapel of Bishop Grandisson located within the west front were probably designed by William Joy, who succeeded Witney as master mason in 1342 but seems to have died in 1347, possibly from the Black Death. From 1377 to 1414 the east, south and west cloister walks were finished by Master Robert Lesyngham, who probably also designed the great East Window (1390–92).

The architecture of Exeter Cathedral at first appears remarkably harmonious with the continuous run of tierceron vaults extending from west to east. Although the bays are irregular in size, the plan is throughout based on a division into ninths. There is also a wonderful array of tracery designs in the clerestorey windows. More detailed analysis nevertheless reveals a number of changes, including the decision to adopt a three-storey facade with a triforium more typical of cathedrals than the previous two-storey design. 3-D scanning of the vaults has also revealed numerous changes to the curvatures of the ribs.

== Notable features ==
A sledge flag used by Robert Falcon Scott in Antarctica during the Discovery Expedition (1901–1904), which was donated to the cathedral by Scott's family in 1920, and is usually on display within the southwest corner of the building.

Notable features of the interior include the misericords, the minstrels' gallery, the astronomical clock and the organ. Notable architectural features of the interior include the multiribbed ceiling and the compound piers in the nave arcade.

The 18-metre-high (59 ft) bishop's throne in the choir was made from Devon oak between 1312 and 1316; the nearby choir stalls were made by George Gilbert Scott in the 1870s. The Great East Window contains much 14th-century glass, and there are over 400 ceiling bosses, one of which depicts the murder of Thomas Becket. The bosses can be seen at the peak of the vaulted ceiling, joining the ribs together. Because there is no centre tower, Exeter Cathedral has the longest uninterrupted medieval vaulted ceiling in the world, at about 96 m (315 ft).

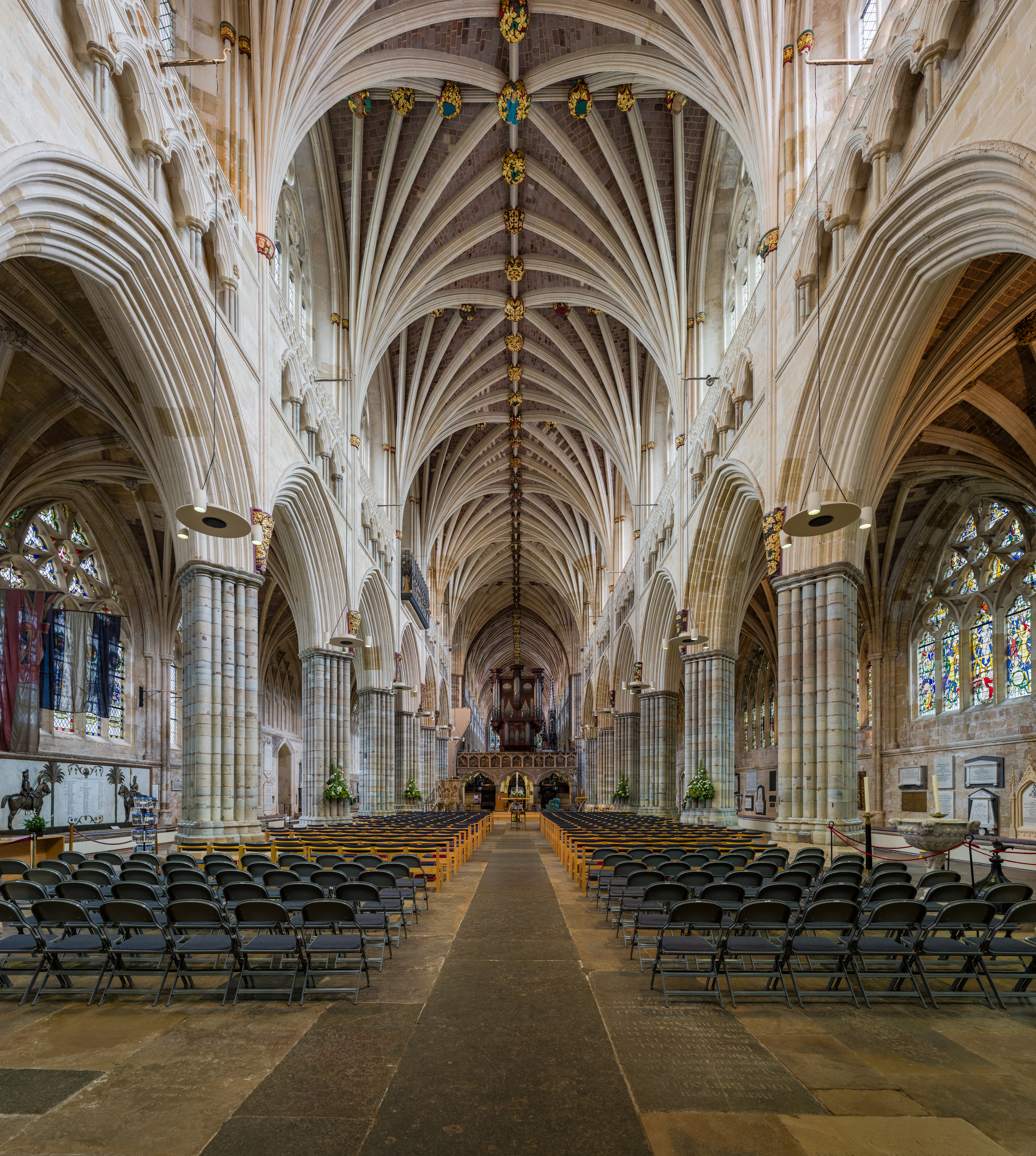
The nave looking east toward the organ

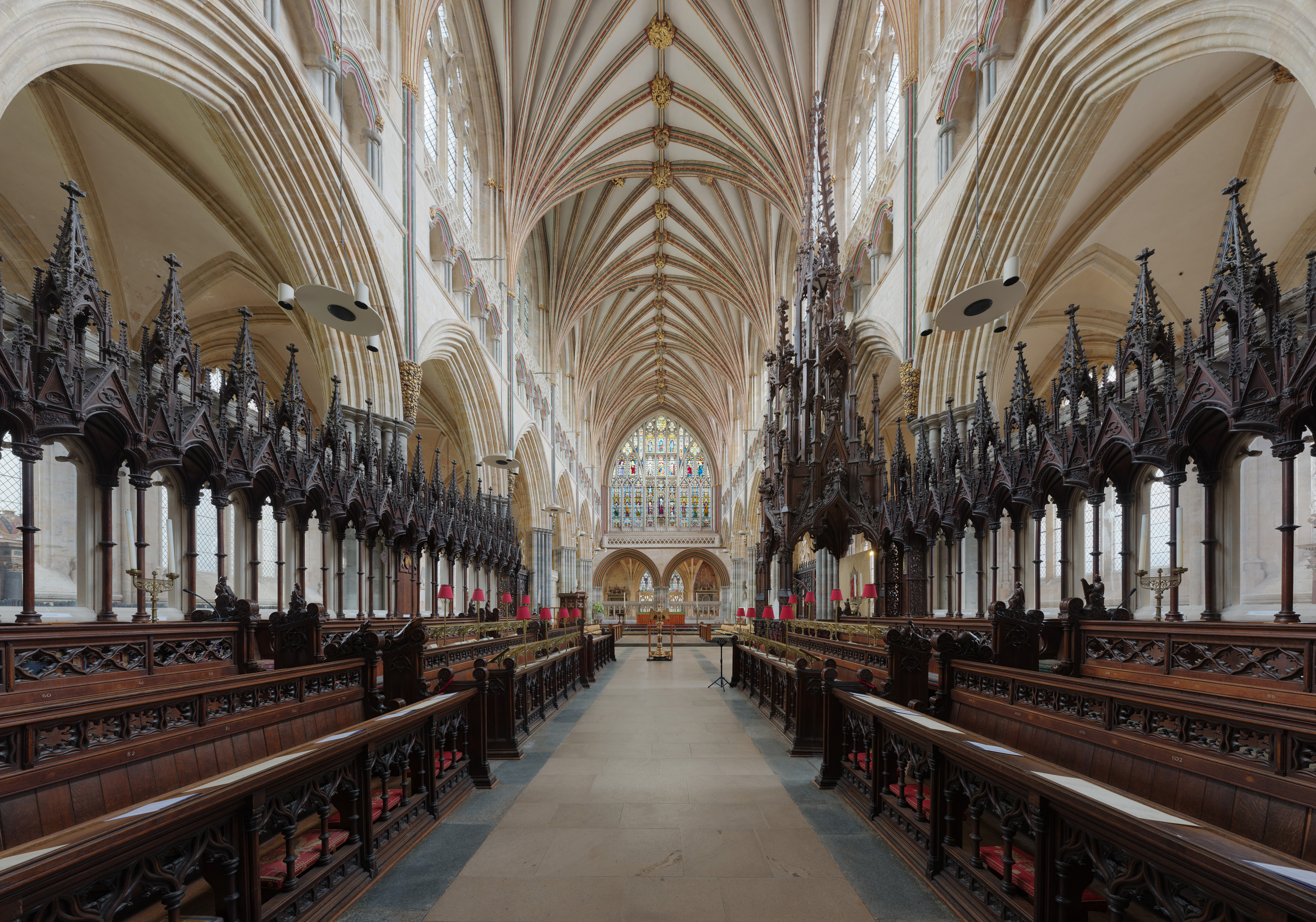
The choir looking east from the organ toward the Lady Chapel

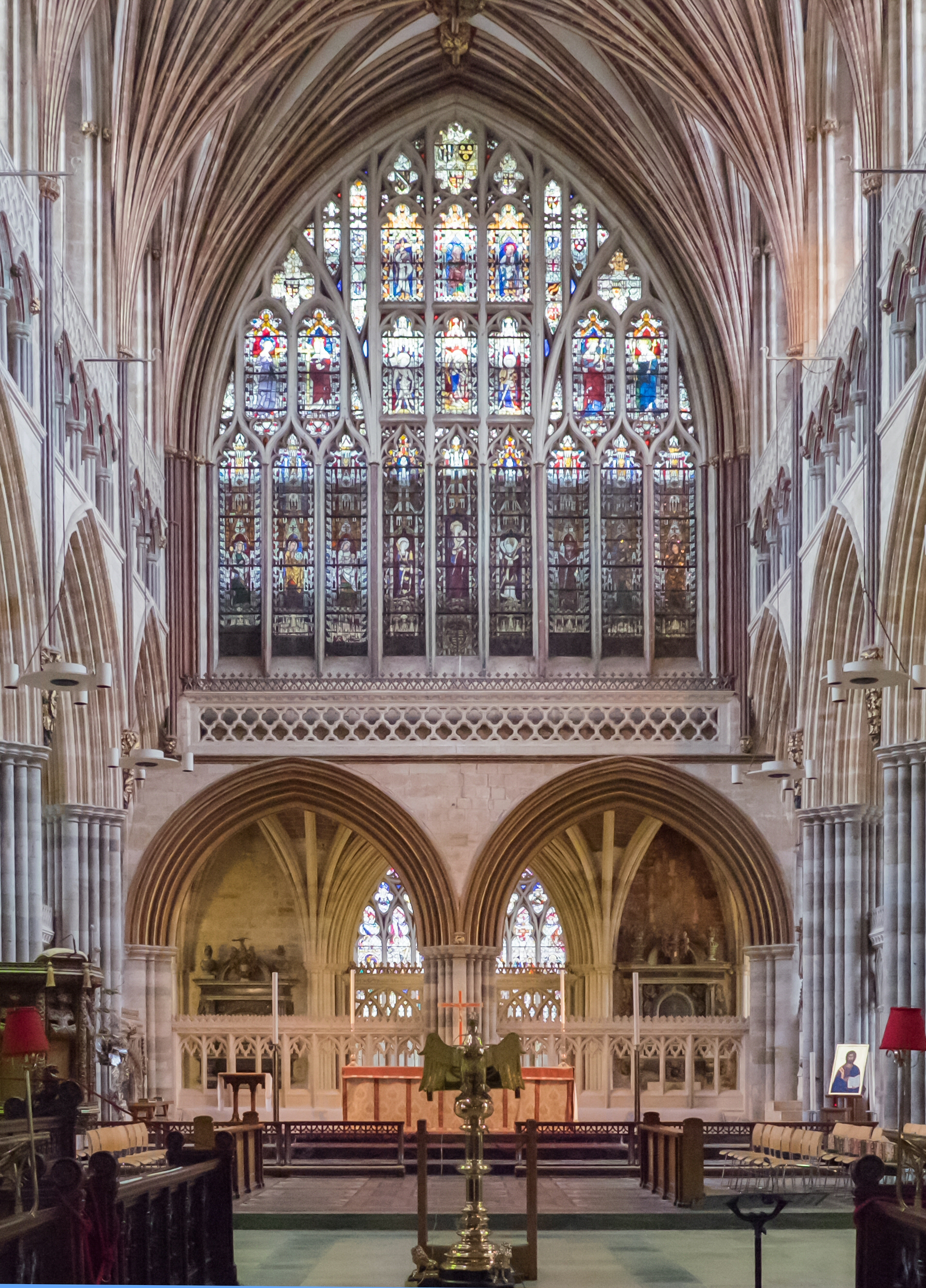
The Great East Window

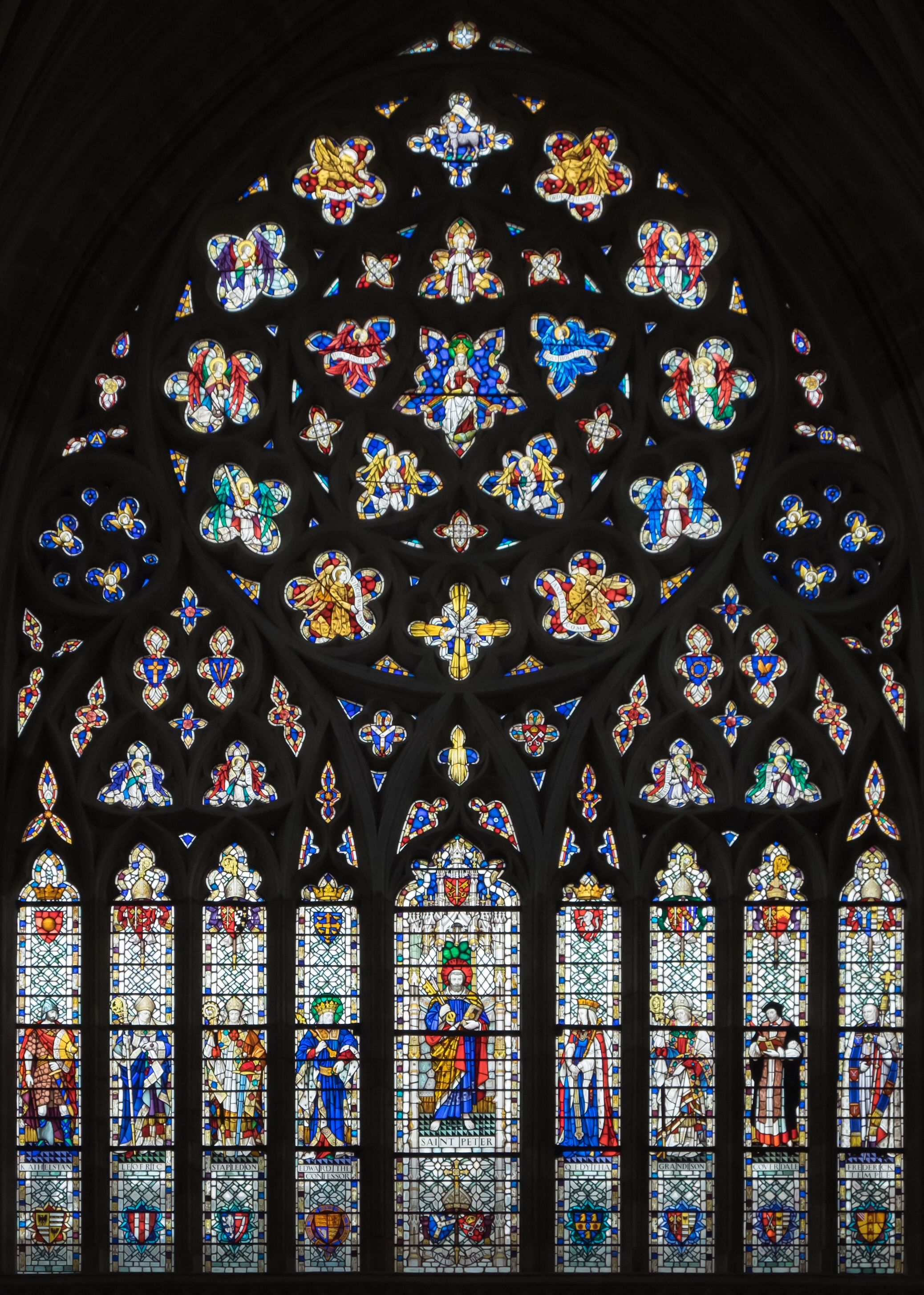
The West Window

Myles Coverdale

=== Misericords ===
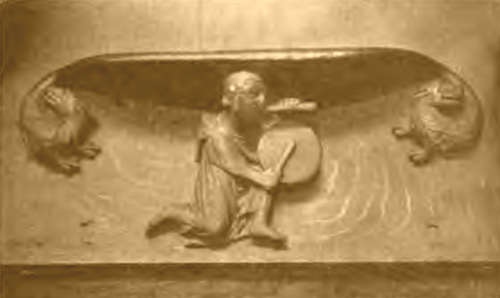
One of the misericords, depicting a pipe and tabor player

The fifty misericords are the earliest complete set in the United Kingdom. They date from two periods: 1220–1230 and 1250–1260. Amongst other things, they depict the earliest known wooden representation of an elephant in the UK. They have supporters.

=== Minstrels' gallery ===
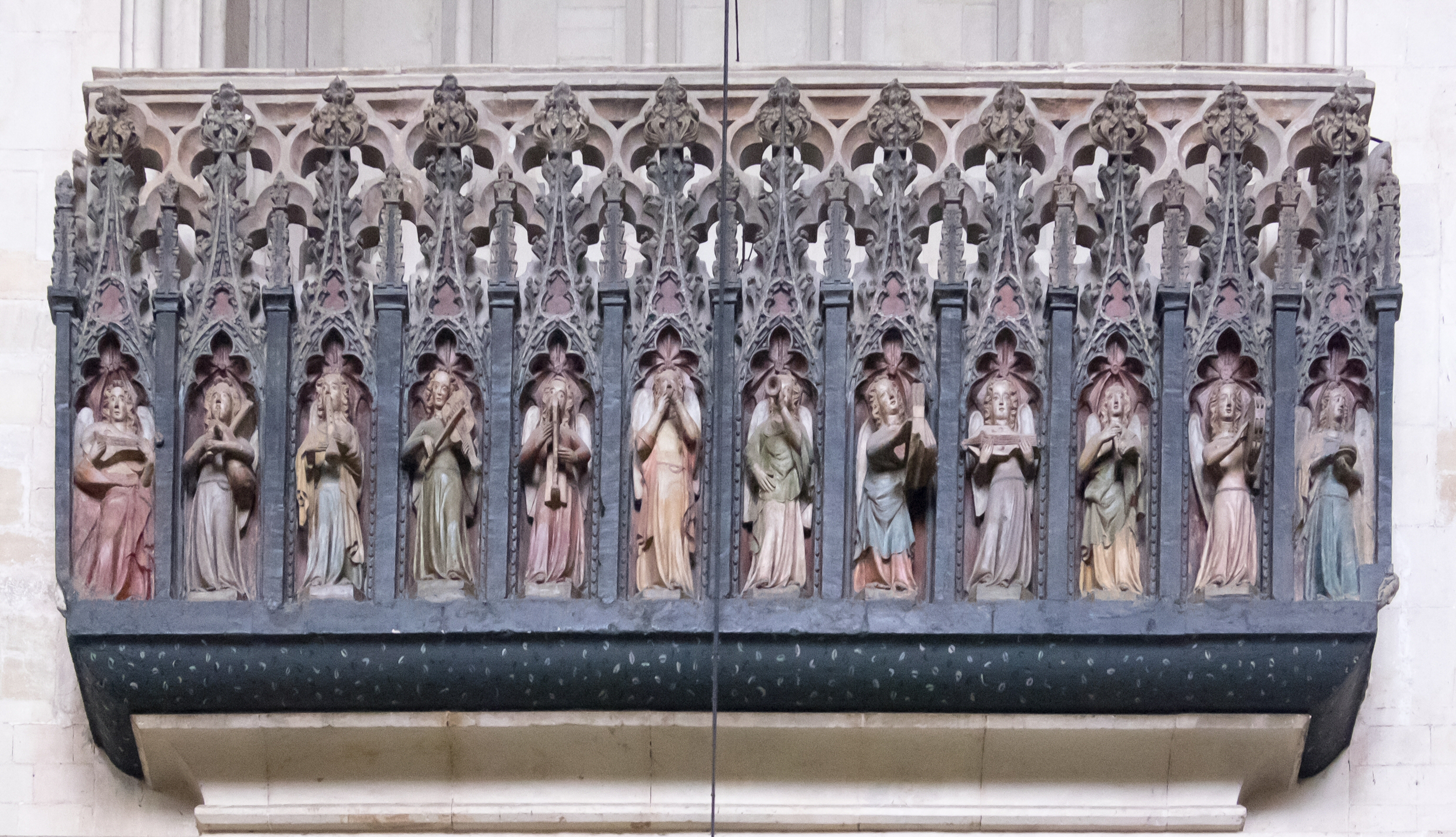
The Minstrels' Gallery

The minstrels' gallery in the nave dates to around 1360 and is unique in English cathedrals. Its front is decorated with 12 carved and painted angels playing medieval musical instruments, including the cittern, bagpipe, hautboy, crwth, harp, trumpet, organ, guitar, tambourine and cymbals, with two others which are uncertain. Since the above list was compiled in 1921, research among musicologists has revised how some of the instruments are called in modern times. Using revised names, the list should now read from left to right gittern, bagpipe, shawm, vielle, harp, jew's harp, trumpet, organ, citole, recorder, tambourine, cymbals.

=== Astronomical clock ===
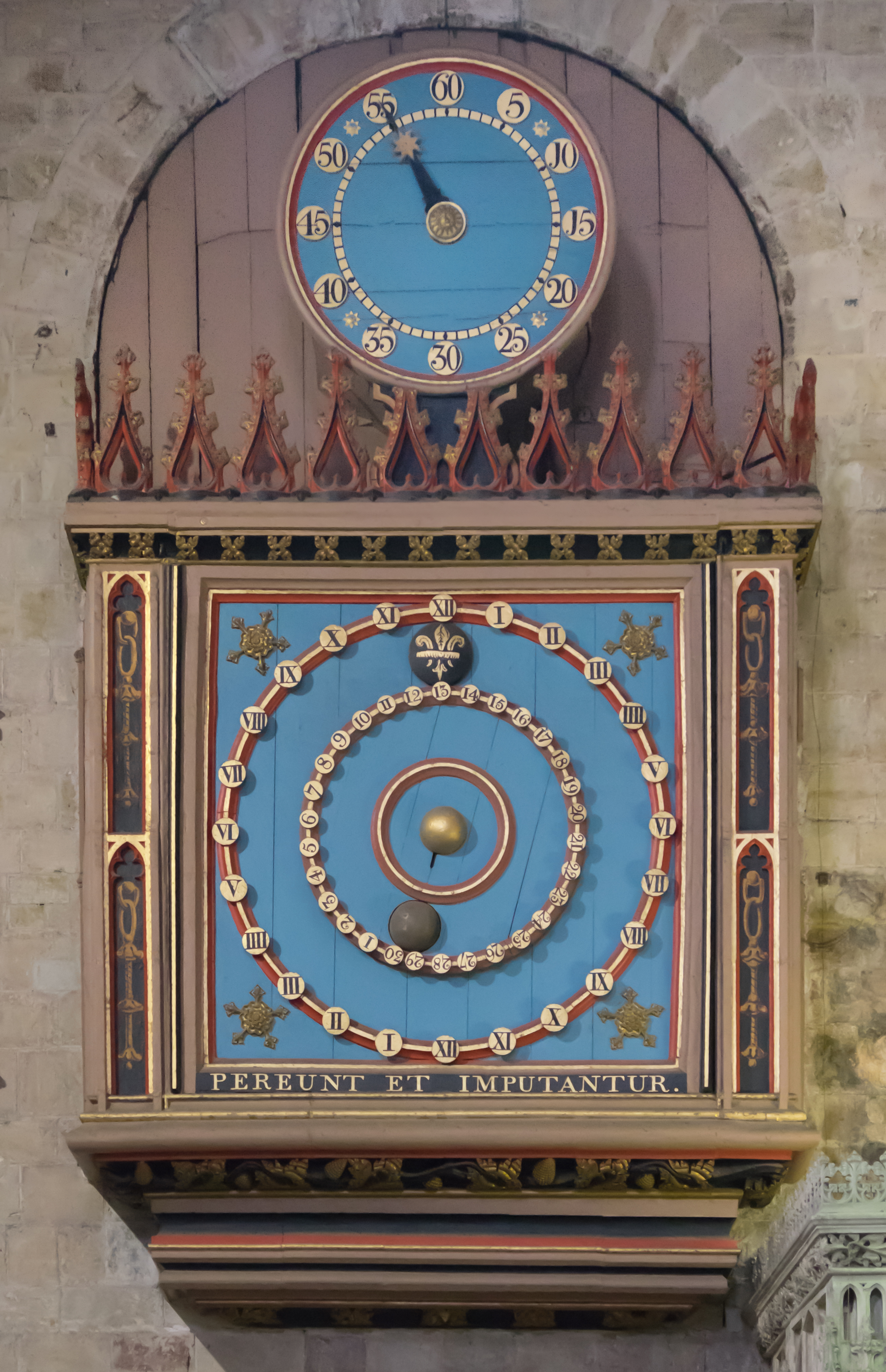
The astronomical clock; the upper minute dial is post-medieval.

The Exeter Cathedral Astronomical Clock is one of the group of famous 14th- to 16th-century astronomical clocks to be found in the west of England. Others are at Wells, Ottery St Mary, and Wimborne Minster.

The main, lower, dial is the oldest part of the clock, dating from 1484. The fleur-de-lys-tipped hand indicates the hour (and the position of the sun in the sky) on a 24-hour analogue dial. The numbering consists of two sets of Roman numerals I to XII. The silver ball and inner dial shows both the age of the moon and its phase (using a rotating black shield to indicate the moon's phase). The upper dial, added in 1760, shows the minutes.

The Latin phrase Pereunt et imputantur, a favourite motto for clocks and sundials, was written by the Latin poet Martial. It is usually translated as "they perish and are reckoned to our account", referring to the hours that we spend, wisely or not. The original clockwork mechanism, much modified, repaired, and neglected until it was replaced in the early 20th century, can be seen on the floor below. The door below the clock has a round hole near its base. This was cut in the early 17th century to allow entry for the bishop's cat to deter vermin that were attracted to the animal fat used to lubricate the clock mechanism.

=== Library ===
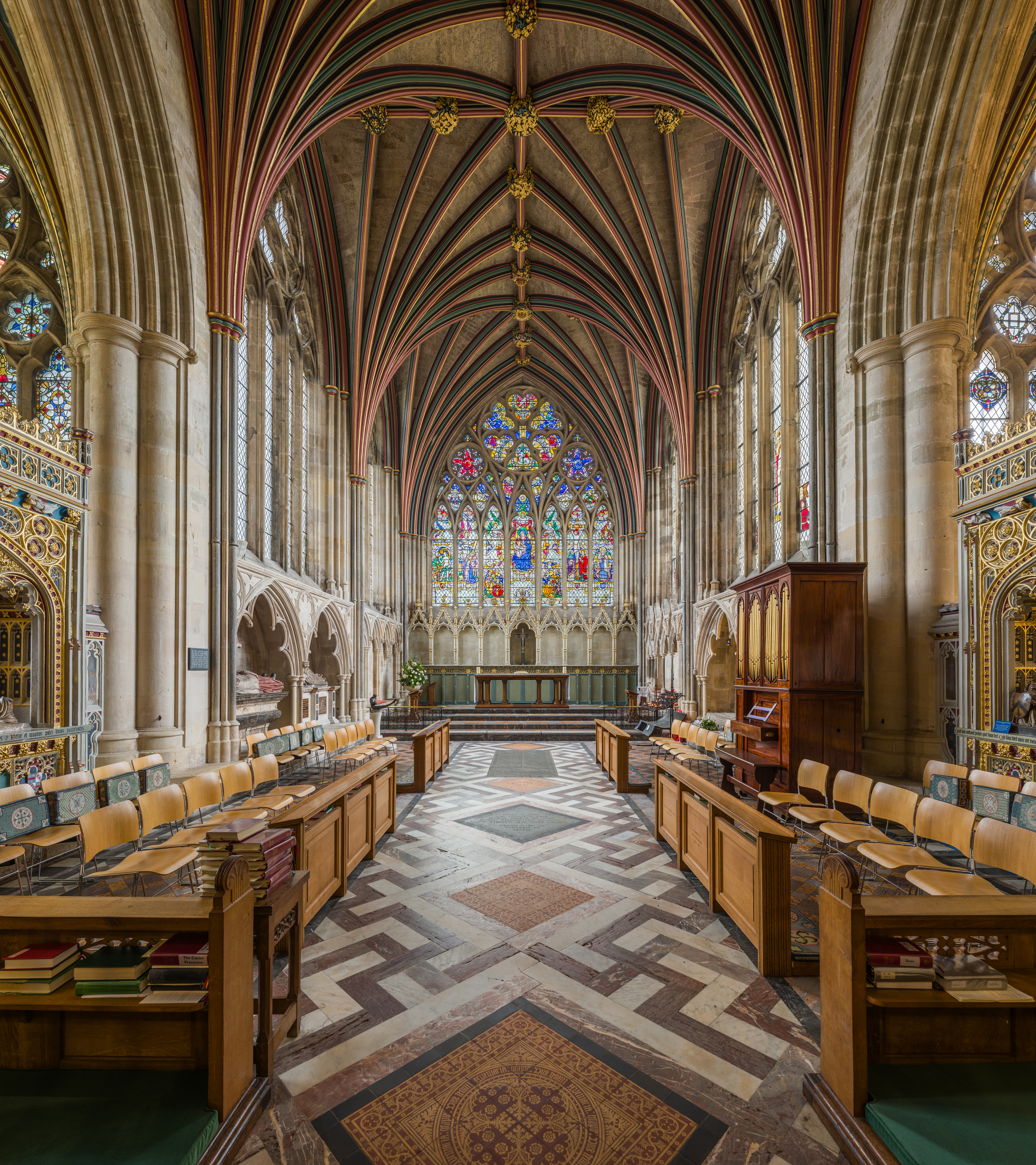
Lady Chapel, where the library was originally located

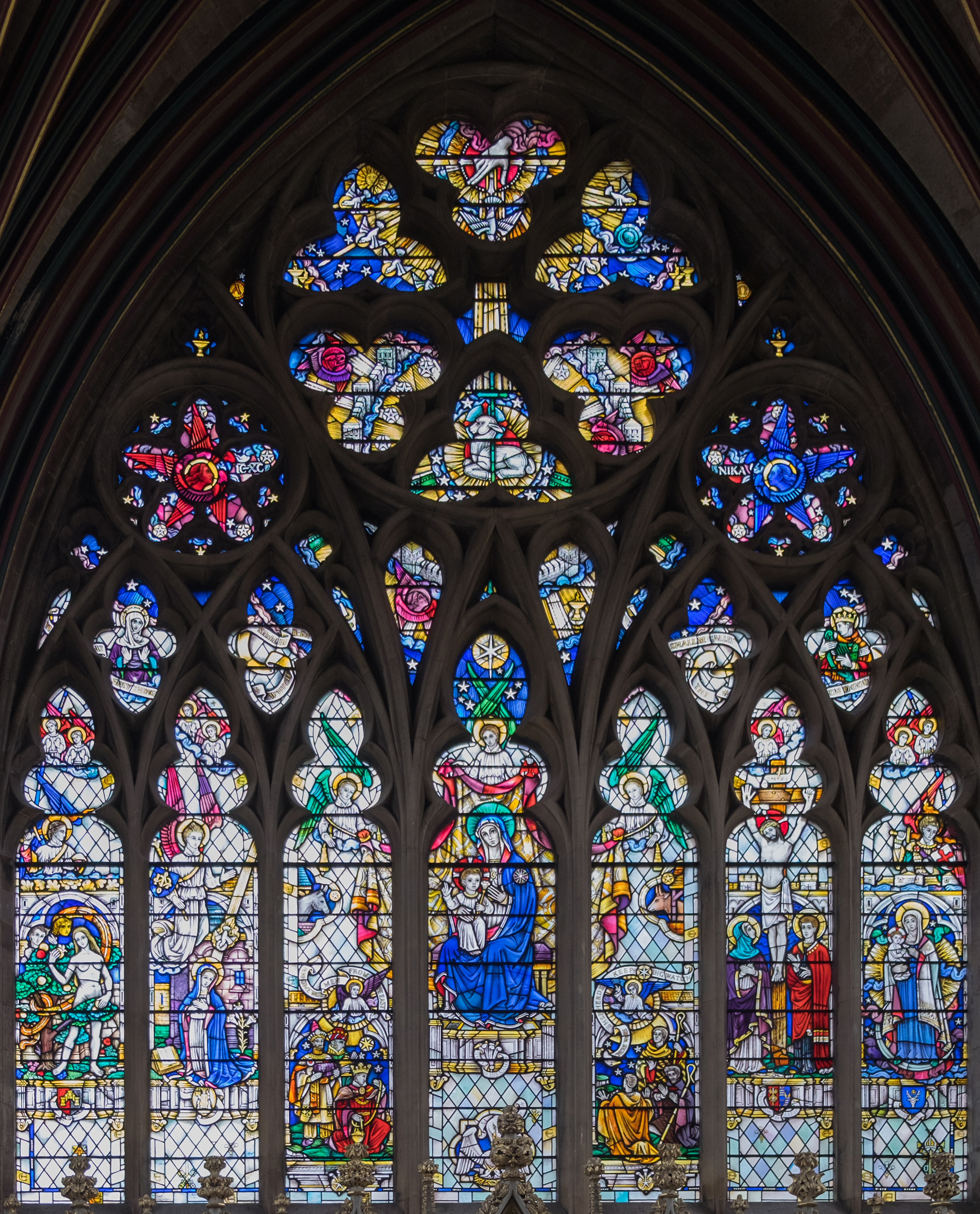
The Lady Chapel east window, inserted post-war replacing Victorian glass which was destroyed during WWII

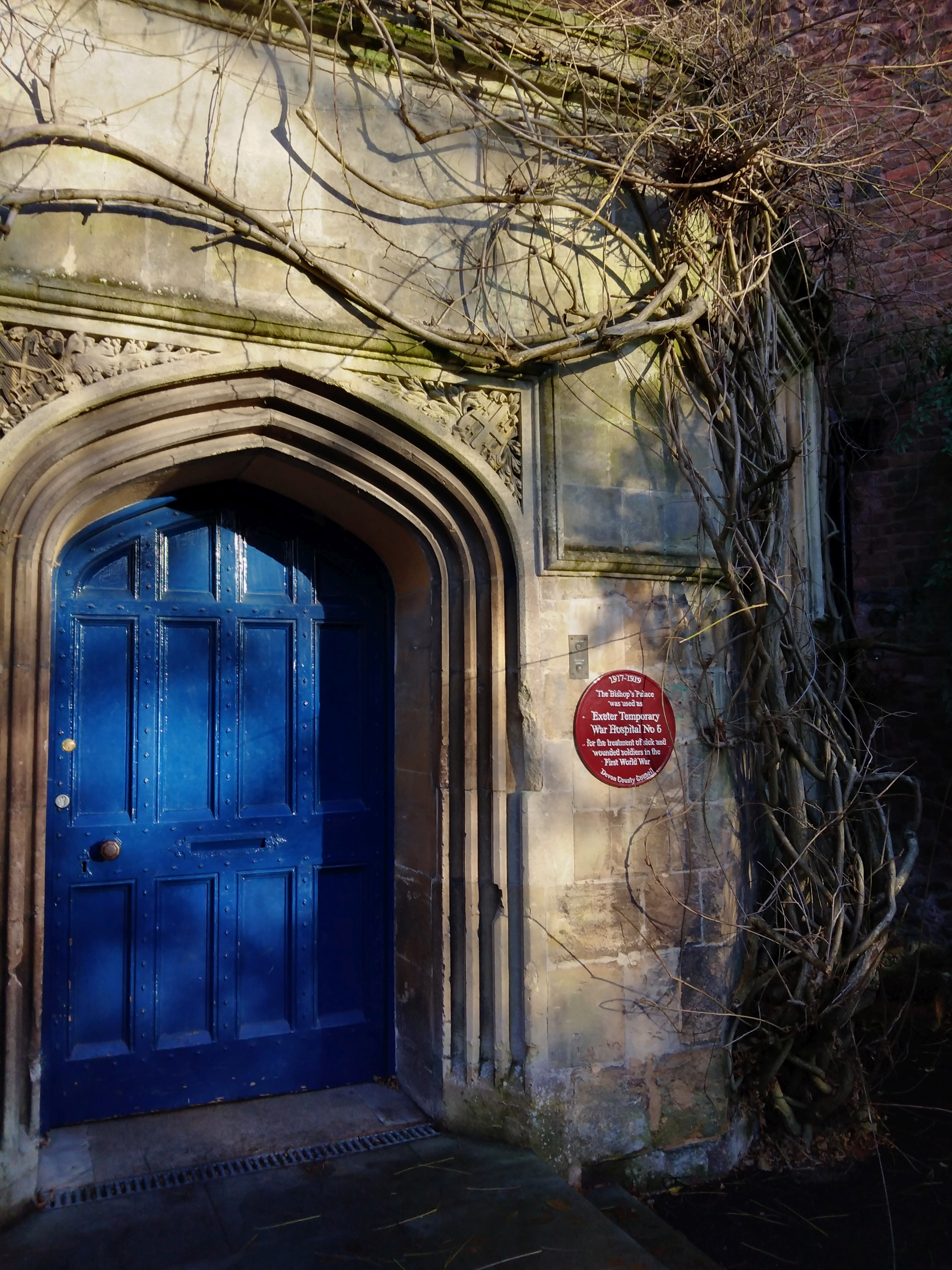
The entrance to the Exeter Cathedral Library & Archives in the west wing of the Bishop's Palace

Si quis illum inde abstulerit eterne subiaceat maledictioni. Fiat. Fiat.
(If any one removes this he shall be eternally cursed. So be it! So be it!)

— Curse written by Leofric on some of the books in his library

The library began during the episcopate of Leofric (1050–1072) who presented the cathedral with 66 books, only one of which remains in the library: this is the Exeter Book (Exeter Cathedral Library MS 3501) of Anglo-Saxon poetry. 16 others have survived and are in the British Library, the Bodleian Library or Cambridge University Library. A 10th-century manuscript of Hrabanus Maurus's De Computo and Isidore of Seville's De Natura Rerum may have belonged to Leofric also but the earliest record of it is in an inventory of 1327. The inventory was compiled by the Sub-Dean, William de Braileghe, and 230 titles were listed. Service books were not included and a note at the end mentions many other books in French, English and Latin which were then considered worthless.

In 1412–13 a new lectrinum was fitted out for the books by two carpenters working for 40 weeks. Those books in need of repair were repaired and some were fitted with chains. A catalogue of the cathedral's books made in 1506 shows that the library furnished some 90 years earlier had 11 desks for books and records over 530 titles, of which more than a third are service books.

In 1566 the Dean and Chapter presented to Matthew Parker, Archbishop of Canterbury, a manuscript of the Anglo-Saxon Gospels which had been given by Leofric; in 1602, 81 manuscripts from the library were presented to Sir Thomas Bodley for the Bodleian Library at Oxford. In 1657 under the Commonwealth the cathedral was deprived of several of its ancillary buildings, including the reading room of 1412–13. Some books were lost but a large part of them were saved due to the efforts of Dr Robert Vilvaine, who had them transferred to St John's Hospital. At a later date he provided funds to convert the Lady chapel into a library, and the books were brought back.

By 1752 it is thought the collection had grown considerably to some 5,000 volumes, to a large extent by benefactions. In 1761 Charles Lyttelton, Dean of Exeter, describes it as having over 6,000 books and some good manuscripts. He describes the work which has been done to repair and list the contents of the manuscripts. At the same time the muniments and records had been cleaned and moved to a suitable muniment room.

In 1820 the library was moved from the Lady Chapel to the chapter house. In the later 19th century two large collections were received by the cathedral, and it was necessary to construct a new building to accommodate the whole library. The collections of Edward Charles Harington and Frederic Charles Cook were together more than twice the size of the existing library, and John Loughborough Pearson was the architect of the new building on the site of the old cloister. During the 20th century the greater part of the library was transferred to rooms in the Bishop's Palace, while the remainder was kept in Pearson's cloister library.

Today, there is a good collection of early medical books, part of which came in 1948 from the Exeter Medical Library (founded 1814), and part on permanent loan from the Royal Devon and Exeter Hospital (1,300 volumes, 1965). The most decorated manuscript in the library is a psalter (MS 3508) probably written for the Church of St Helen at Worcester in the early 13th century. The earliest printed book now in the library is represented by only a single leaf: this is Cicero's De officiis (Mainz: Fust and Schoeffer, 1465–66).

=== Anglo-Saxon Charters ===
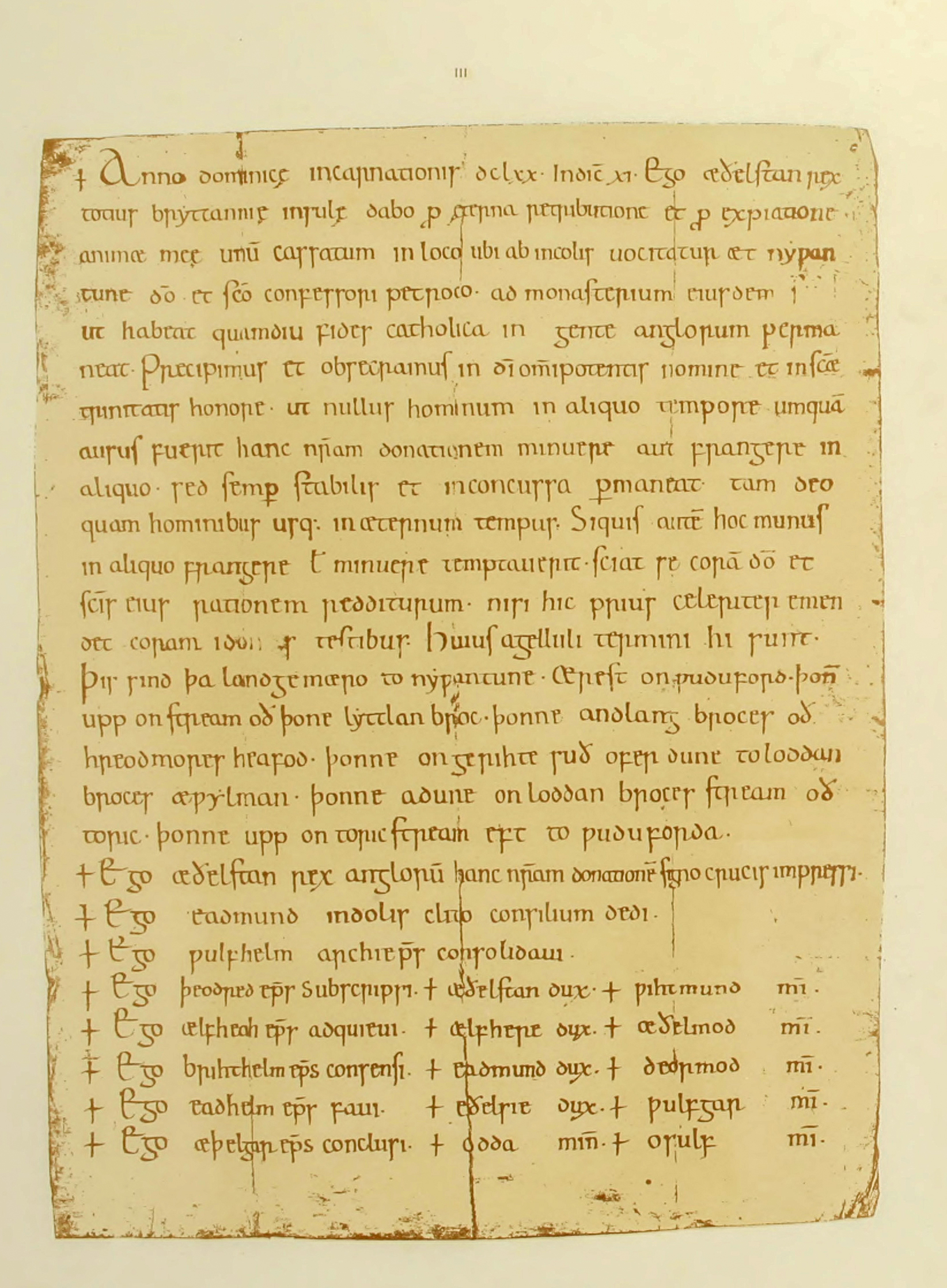
Sawyer 388 Grant of one hide (cassatum) at Newton [St. Petroc] (Nywantune), Devon, by King Athelstan to the monastery of St. Petroc, Bodmin. A late 11th century forgery of a charter that purported to be from AD 670. The charter is one of 36 in the Exeter Cathedral Library collection.

The Exeter Cathedral Library collections holds some 36 Anglo-Saxon Charters, all dating to the 10th and 11th centuries. The texts of 15 were published by James B. Davidson (1883); which Chaplais considered the "largest single collection of apparent original [charters] to have come from the south-west of England". The Ordnance Survey published photozincograph facsimiles of 16 of the charters in 1881.

The collection can be divided into three groups:

1. Charters alleged to have been granted to the monastery of Exeter before 1050 (7 documents)
2. Charters concerning the bishoprics of Crediton and Cornwall (18 documents)
3. Documents connected with Bishop Leofric and the see of Exeter proper (3 documents)

=== Bells ===
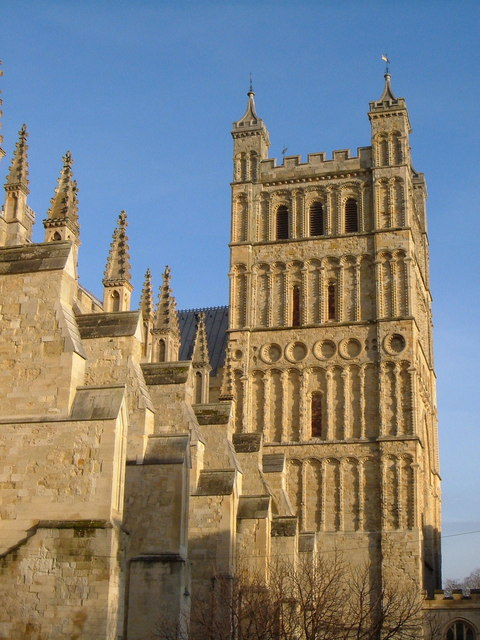
The South Tower where the 12 bells hang

Both of the cathedral's towers contain bells. The North Tower contains an 80-hundredweight (4.1-tonne) bourdon bell, called Peter. Peter used to swing but it is now only chimed.

The South Tower contains the second heaviest peal of 12 bells hung for change ringing in the world, with a tenor weighing 72 long cwt 2 qr 2 lb (8,122 lb or 3,684 kg). They are second only to Liverpool Cathedral in weight. There are also two semitone bells in addition to the peal of 12.

== Dean and Chapter ==
As of 5 December 2020:

- Dean of Exeter — Jonathan Greener (since 26 November 2017 installation)
- Canon Precentor — James Mustard (since 25 March 2018 installation)
- Canon Chancellor — Chris Palmer (since 5 August 2018 installation)
- Canon Steward — Cate Edmonds (SSM; (residentiary canon) since 22 October 2019 installation)

Non-Canons

- Priest Vicar — Ian Morter (Canon Treasurer & Pastor 2010–2017; Priest Vicar since June 2018)
- Priest Vicar — Julian Ould

== Burials ==
A full listing of monuments and transcription of inscriptions in the cathedral is contained in: Hewett, John William, Remarks on the Monumental Brasses and Certain Decorative Remains in the Cathedral Church of St Peter, Exeter, to which is Appended a Complete Monumentarium, published in Transactions of the Exeter Diocesan Architectural Society, Volume 3, Exeter, 1846–1849, pp. 90–138
Persons buried within the cathedral include the following:

- Leofric (bishop), first Bishop of Exeter (1050–1072)
- Robert Warelwast, Bishop of Exeter (1138–1155)
- Bartholomew Iscanus, Bishop of Exeter (1161–1184)
- John the Chanter, Bishop of Exeter (1186–1191)
- Henry Marshal, Bishop of Exeter (1194–1206)
- Simon of Apulia, Bishop of Exeter (1214–1223)
- Walter Bronescombe, Bishop of Exeter (1258–1280)
- Peter Quinel, Bishop of Exeter (1280–1291)
- Henry de Bracton (c. 1210 – c. 1268), English ecclesiastic and jurist
- Sir Henry de Raleigh (died 1301), knight
- Walter de Stapledon, Bishop of Exeter (1308–1326)
- Sir Richard de Stapledon (died 1326), knight, elder brother of Bishop Stapledon
- James Berkeley (died 1327), Bishop of Exeter
- John Grandisson, Bishop of Exeter (1327–1369)
- Hugh Courtenay, 2nd Earl of Devon (1303–1377) and his wife Margaret de Bohun (died 1391)
- Thomas de Brantingham, English lord treasurer and Bishop of Exeter (1370–1394)
- Sir Peter Courtenay (died 1405), fifth son of Hugh Courtenay, 2nd Earl of Devon
- William Wilford (died 1413), Steward, Exeter Mich. 1396–7; receiver 1397–8; Member of the council of 12 1398–9, 1401–2, 1403–4, 1405–6, 1407–8, 1409–10, 1411–12; Mayor of Exeter 1400–1, 1402–3, 1404–5, 1406–7, 1408–9, 1410–11, 1412–13.
- Edmund Stafford, Lord Privy Seal, Lord Chancellor, Baron Stafford and Bishop of Exeter (1395–1419)
- Edmund Lacey, Bishop of Exeter (1420–1455), whose tomb had been a shrine, but which was walled over during the Reformation, fragments were uncovered during the Baedeker Blitz
- John Speke (1442–1518) of Whitelackington, Somerset and of Heywood in the parish of Wembworthy and of Bramford Speke, Devon (buried in the Speke Chantry)
- Hugh Oldham, Bishop of Exeter (1504–1519; buried in the Oldham Chantry)
- William Alley, Bishop of Exeter (1560–1571)
- William Bradbridge, Bishop of Exeter (1571–1578)
- John Woolton, Bishop of Exeter (1579–1594)
- Dr. William Cotton, Bishop of Exeter (1598–1621) buried in Exeter Cathedral. His monument with recumbent effigy survives.
- Ofspring Blackall (1655–1716), Bishop of Exeter (1708–1716) buried on the southern side of the choir in an unmarked grave
- John Ross (1719–1792), Bishop of Exeter (1778–1792) buried in the south aisle of the choir, the place being marked by a flat tombstone and the inscription 'J. R., D.D., 1792.'
- Bryan Blundell (1757–1799), Major General in the Army and Lieutenant Colonel of the 45th Regiment of Foot
- Sir Gawen Carew
- Peter (Pierre) of Courtenay (1126–1183), youngest son of Louis VI of France and his second Queen consort Adélaide de Maurienne.
- Sir Peter Carew (c. 1514 – 1575) is not buried in the cathedral, but is commemorated by a mural monument.
- George Knight-Bruce, Bishop of Bloemfontein (1886– 1891) and first Bishop of Mashonaland (now Harare)(1891–1895) is commemorated by a memorial tablet.
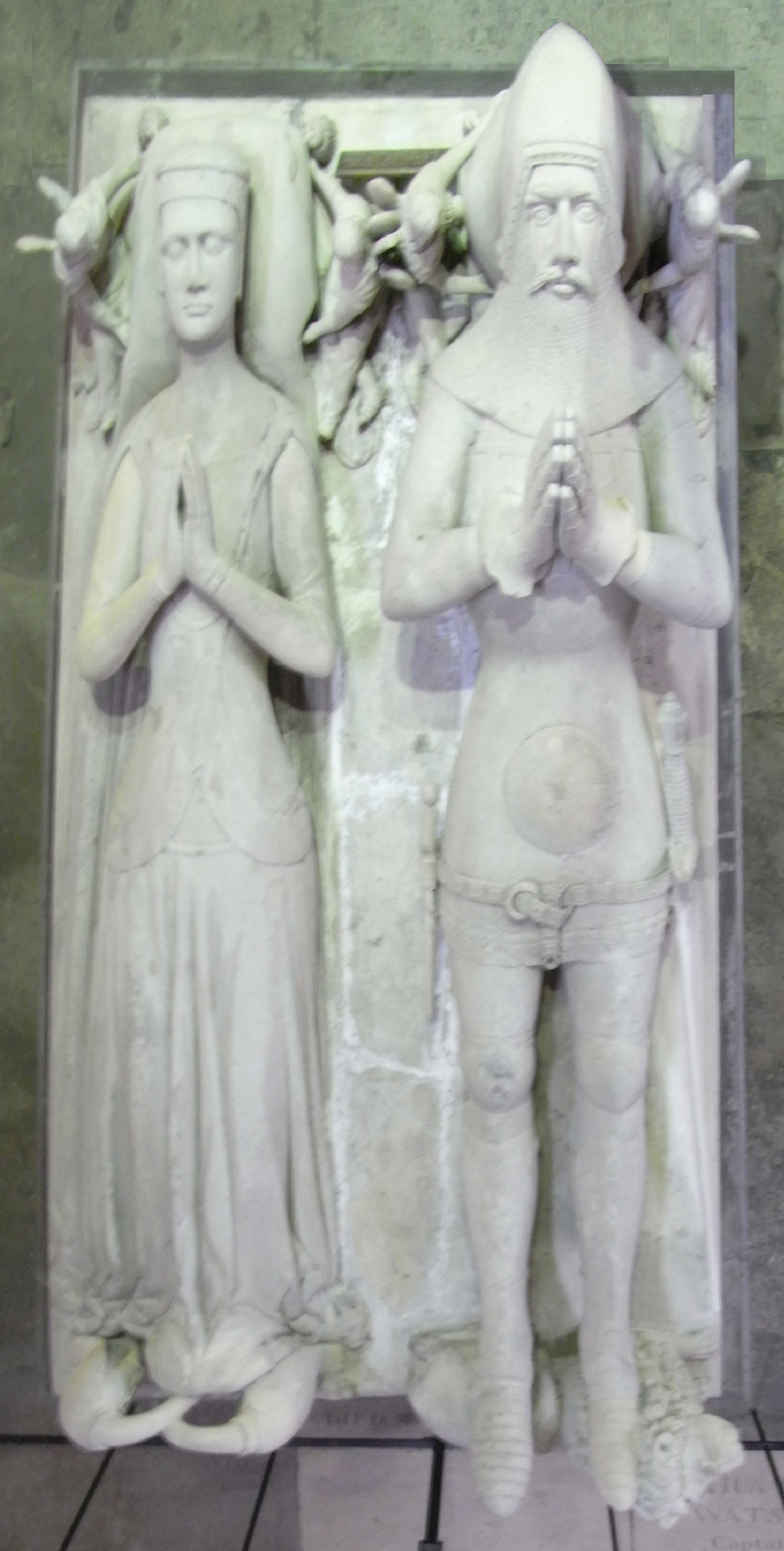
Effigies of Hugh Courtenay, 2nd Earl of Devon, and his wife Margaret de Bohun

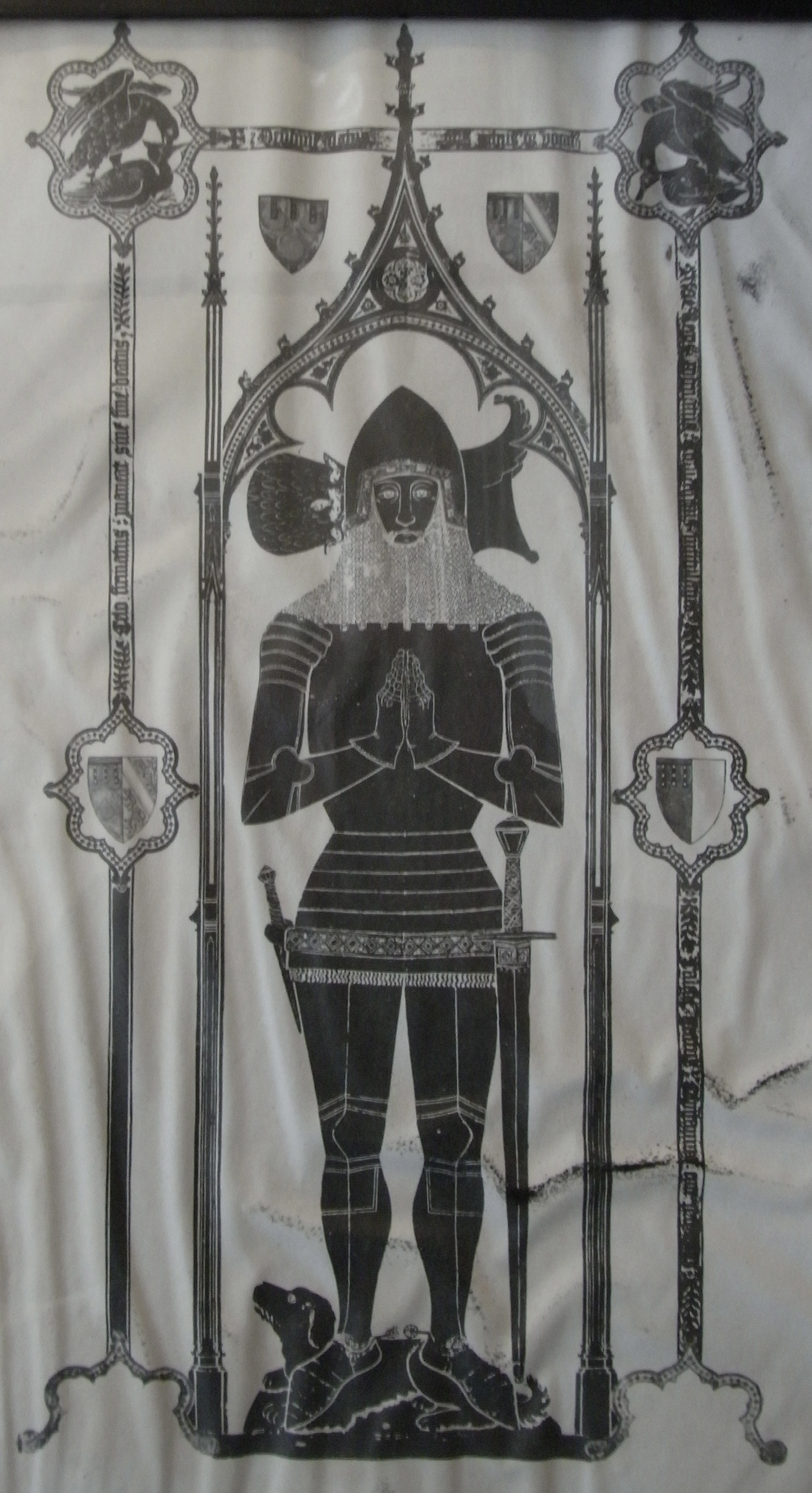
Rubbing from monumental brass of Sir Peter Courtenay, Exeter Cathedral, south aisle

Mural monument to Sir Peter Carew, south transept

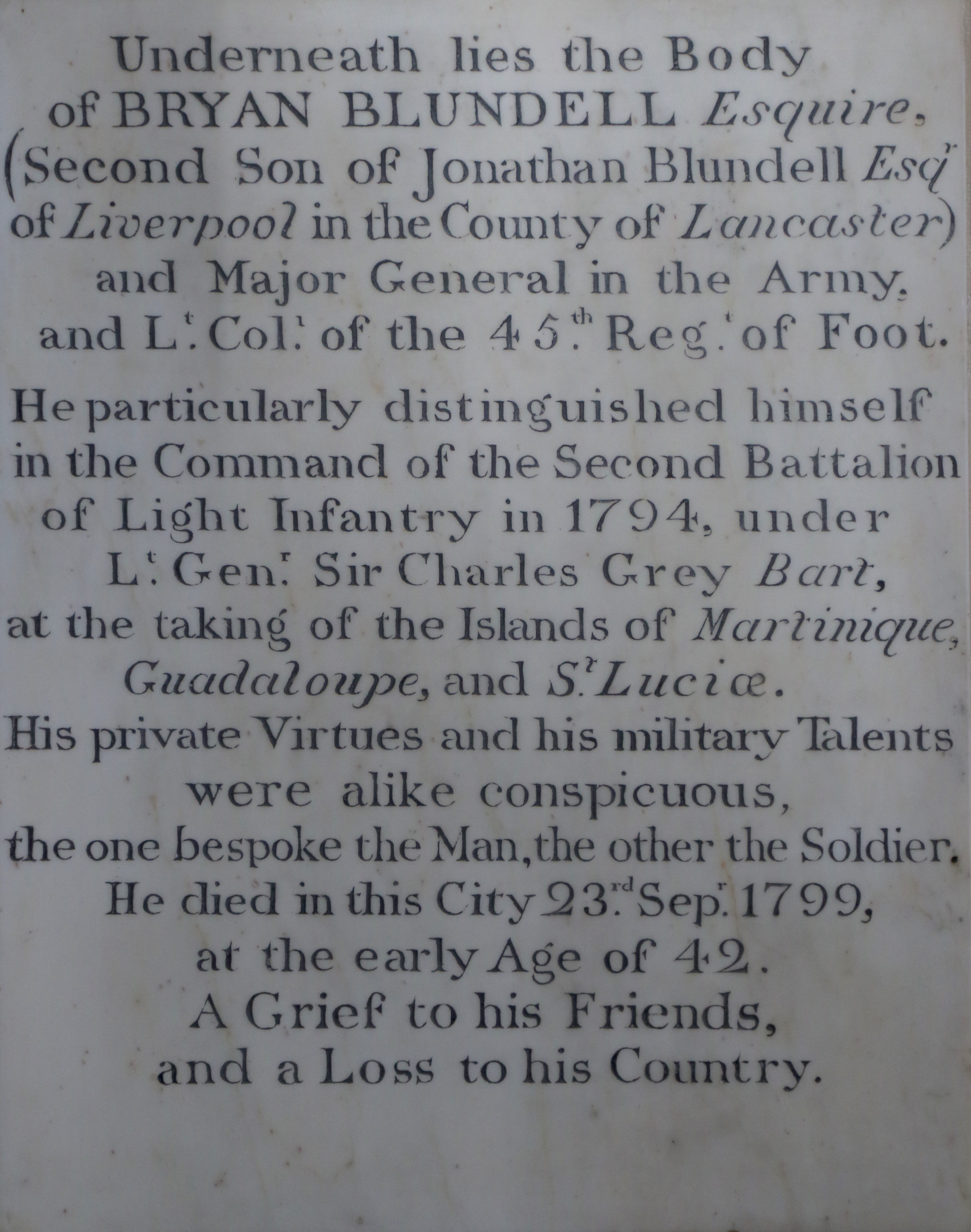
Wall tablet to Major-General Bryan Blundell Esq, north east chapel

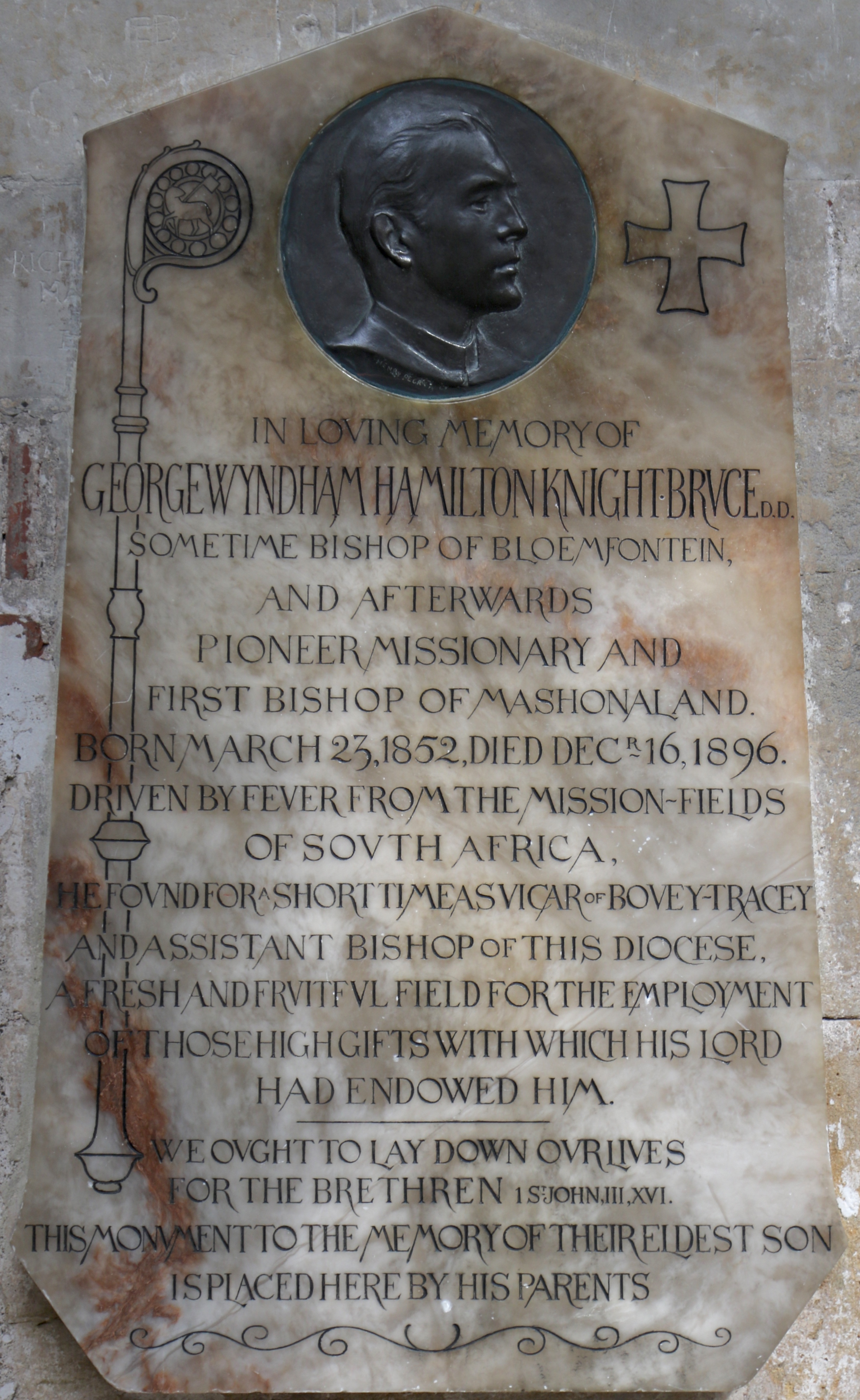
Wall tablet commemorating George Knight-Bruce, first bishop of Mashonaland (now Harare)

== Legends ==
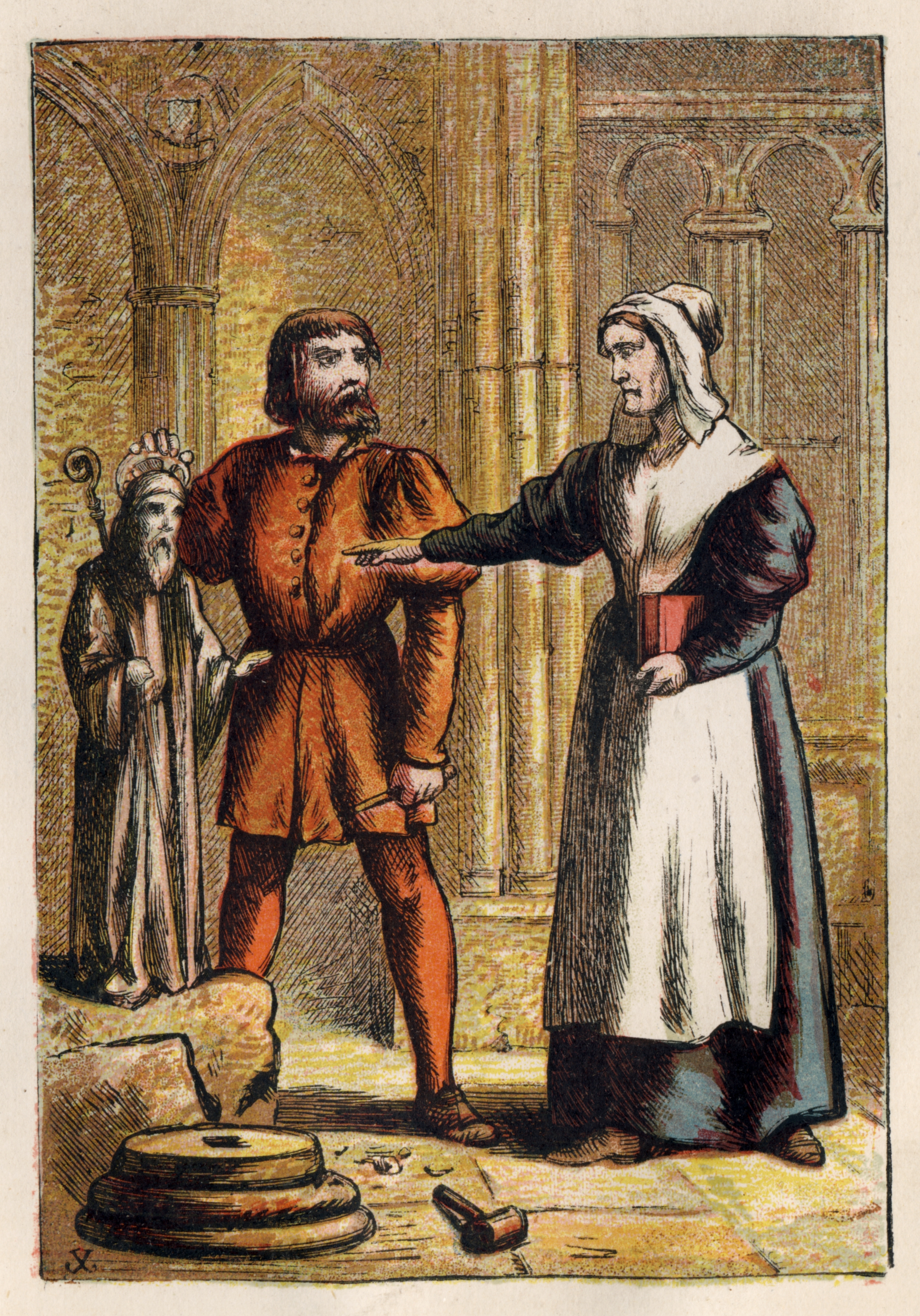
Prest's wife and the Stonemason from an 1887 edition of Foxe's Book of Martyrs

One 19th-century author claimed that an 11th-century missal asserted that King Æthelstan, the previous century, had brought together a great collection of holy relics at Exeter Cathedral; sending out emissaries at great expense to the continent to acquire them. Amongst these items were said to be a little of "the bush in which the Lord spoke to Moses", and a "bit of the candle which the angel of the Lord lit in Christ's tomb".

According to the semi-legendary tale, the Protestant martyr Agnes Prest, during her brief time of liberty in Exeter before her execution in 1557, met a stonemason repairing the statues at the cathedral. She stated that there was no use repairing their noses, since "within a few days shall all lose their heads". There is a memorial to her and another Protestant martyr, Thomas Benet, in the Livery Dole area of Exeter. The memorial was designed by Harry Hems and raised by public subscription in 1909.

== Wildlife ==
The tube web spider Segestria florentina, notable for its iridescent shiny green fangs, can be found within the outer walls. The walls are made of calcareous stone, which decays from acidic pollution, to form cracks and crevices which the spider and other invertebrates inhabit.

== Music ==
=== Choir ===
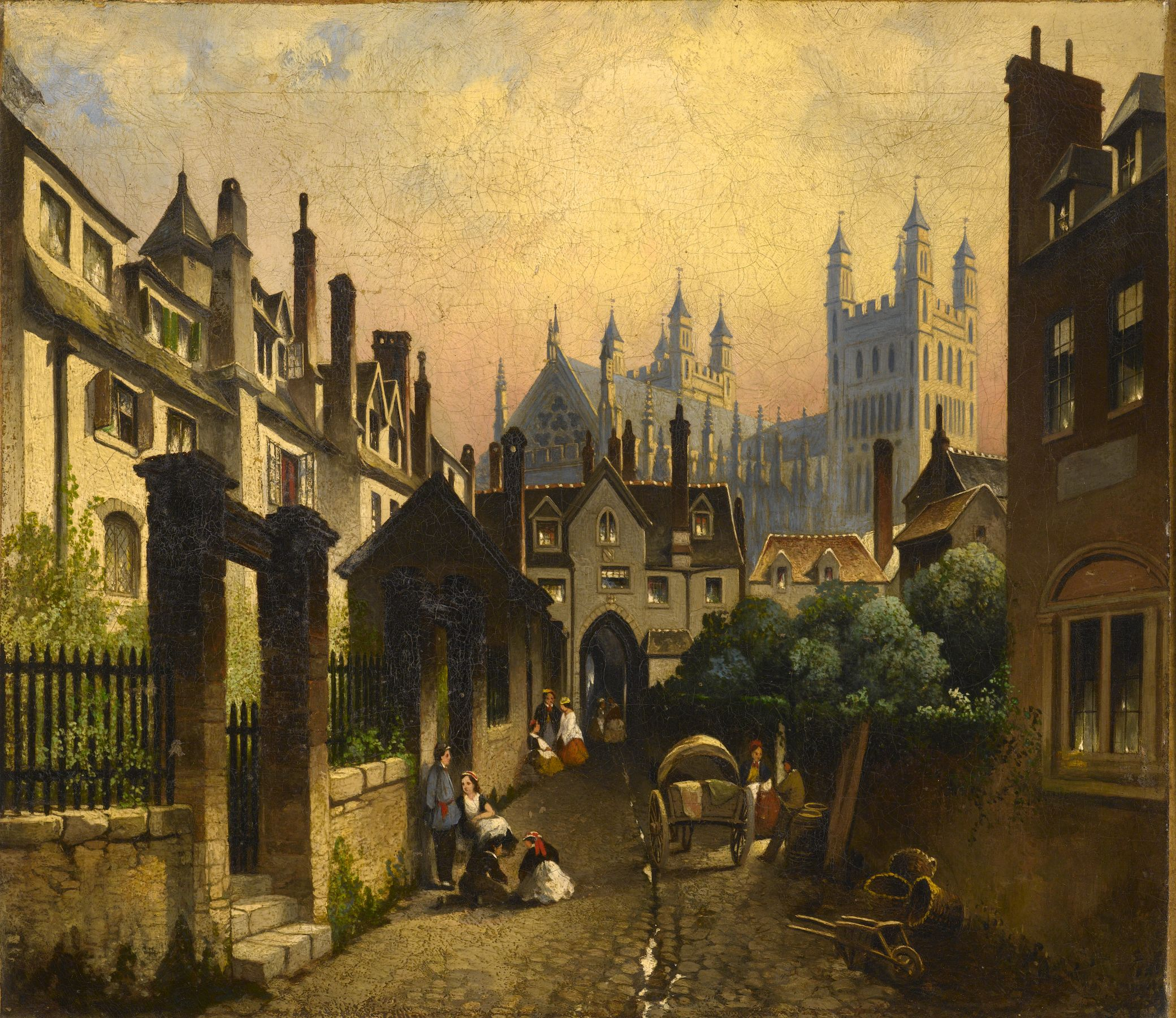
The College of Vicars' Choral, Exeter, oil on canvas by an unknown artist

Exeter Cathedral Choir is composed of 38 Choristers (boys and girls) along with Choral Scholars and Lay Vicars. There is also a voluntary choir, the St Peter's singers, dating back to 1881.

=== Organists ===
Recorded names of organists at Exeter go back to Matthew Godwin, 1586. Notable organists at Exeter Cathedral include Victorian composer Samuel Sebastian Wesley, grandson of Methodist founder and hymn-writer Charles Wesley, educator Ernest Bullock, and conductor Thomas Armstrong. The current Director of Music, Timothy Noon, was appointed in 2016.

=== Organ ===
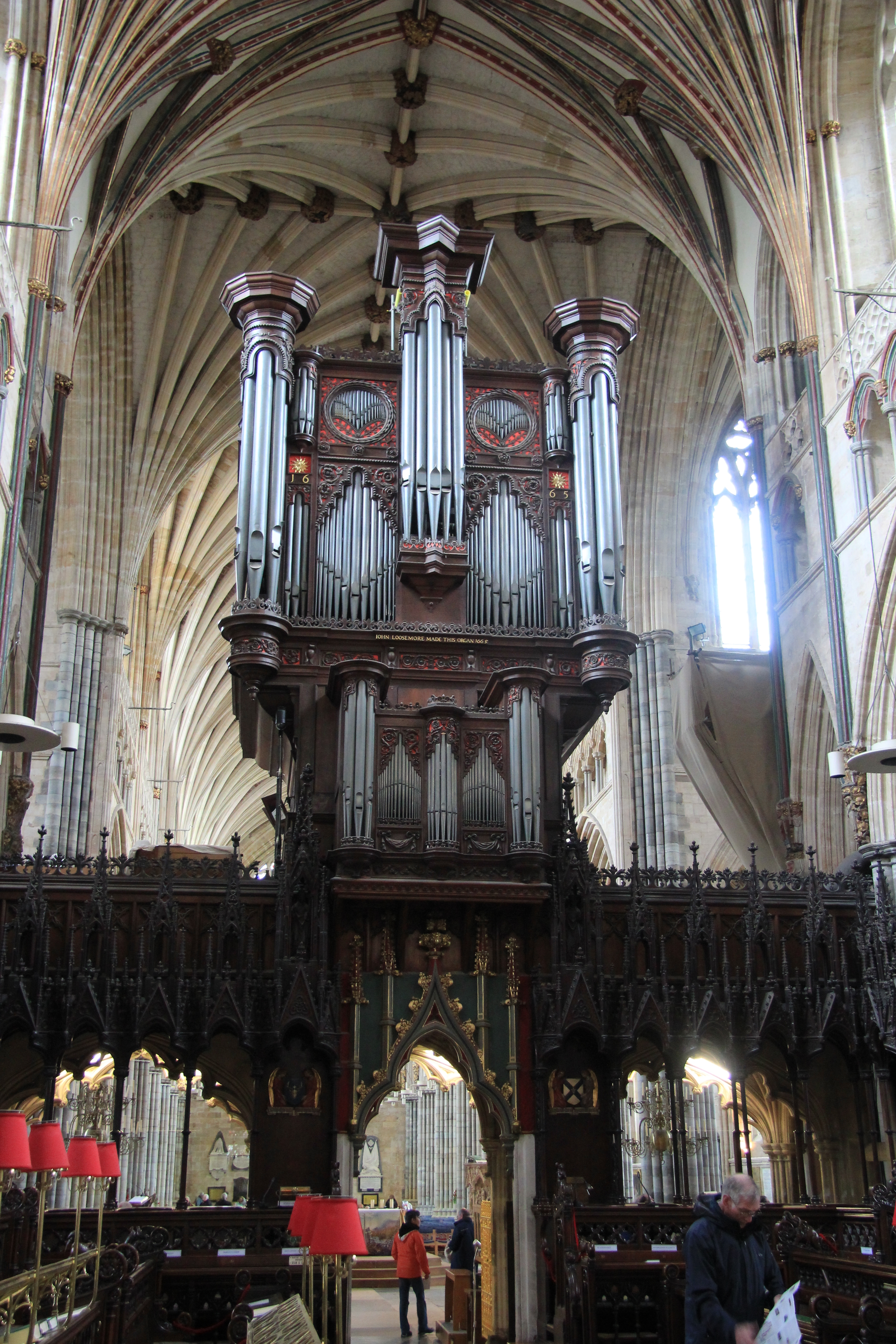
The 17th-century organ case (enlarged in 1891)

The Cathedral organ stands on the ornate medieval screen, preserving the old classical distinction between quire and nave. The first organ was built by John Loosemore in 1665. There was a radical rebuild by Henry Willis in 1891, and again by Harrison & Harrison in 1931. The largest pipes, the lower octave of the 32′ Contra Violone, stand just inside the south transept. The organ has one of only three trompette militaire stops in the country (the others are in Liverpool Cathedral and London's St Paul's Cathedral), housed in the minstrels' gallery, along with a chorus of diapason pipes.

In January 2013 an extensive refurbishment began on the organ, undertaken by Harrison & Harrison. The work consisted of an overhaul and a re-design of the internal layout of the soundboards and ranks of the organ pipes. In October 2014 the work was completed and the organ was reassembled, save for the final voicing and tuning of the new instrument.

== See also ==
- Dean of Exeter
- Exeter Cathedral School
- Exeter monastery
- Myles Coverdale Bishop of Exeter, 1548–1553
- List of cathedrals in the United Kingdom
- List of Gothic Cathedrals in Europe
- Architecture of the medieval cathedrals of England
- Romanesque architecture

== Sources ==
- Addleshaw, Percy (1921). Bell's Cathedrals: The Cathedral Church of Exeter (New and revised ed.). G. Bell & Sons, London. Online copy
- here at Project Gutenberg
- Erskine, Audrey; Hope, Vyvyan; Lloyd, John (1988). Exeter Cathedral – A Short History and Description. Dean and Chapter of Exeter Cathedral. ISBN 0-9503320-4-6.
