= Philip Pare =

Philip Norris Pare was an Anglican priest and author in the second half of the 20th century.

== Biography ==
Pare was born on 13 May 1910 and educated at Nottingham High School and King's College, Cambridge. He was ordained after a period of study at Ripon College Cuddesdon in 1935 and was initially a Curate at All Saints, West Dulwich. After this he was Vice-Principal at Bishops College, Cheshunt and then a Chaplain in the RNVR until the end of World War II. Returning to Cheshunt he was its Vicar until 1957 and then Missioner Canon Stipendiary for the Diocese of Wakefield, a post he held until 1962. He was then Provost of Wakefield until 1971.
He died on 20 April 1992.

Church of England titles
Preceded by Noel Thomas Hopkins	Provost of Wakefield; 1962 – 1971	Succeeded by John Field Lister
