= William MacLeod (priest) =

20th Century Anglican Priest

William Arthur MacLeod was an Anglican priest in the first half of the 20th century.
He was born in Duns in 1867 and educated at Loretto School and Selwyn College, Cambridge. He was ordained in 1892 and was initially a Curate at Christ Church, Greenwich. He then held similar posts at Addington and Godalming. He was British Chaplain in St Petersburg from 1900 to 1908 and then Vicar of All Saints, South Acton until 1919 (including a spell as a Chaplain to the British Armed Forces during World War I) . He was Vicar of Wakefield from 1919 until his death; and when that church became a cathedral, its first Provost.

Church of England titles
Preceded by Inaugural appointment	Provost of Wakefield; 1931 – 1932	Succeeded by Noel Thomas Hopkins
