= John Lister (priest) =

- Provost of Wakefield
- Church: Church of England
- Diocese: Diocese of Wakefield
- In office: 1972 to 1982
- Predecessor: Philip Pare
- Successor: John Allen
- Other post: Archdeacon of Halifax (1961–1972)

Orders
- Ordination: 1939 (deacon); 1941 (priest)

Personal details
- Born: John Field Lister; 19 January 1916
- Died: 23 August 2006 (aged 90)
- Denomination: Anglicanism
- Education: King's School, Worcester
- Alma mater: Keble College, Oxford; Cuddesdon College

John Field Lister (19 January 1916 – 23 August 2006) was an Anglican priest.

== Early life and education ==
Lister was born on 19 January 1916. He was educated at King's School, Worcester, a private school in Worcester, Worcestershire. He studied theology at Keble College, Oxford, graduating with a Bachelor of Arts (BA) degree in 1938; and proceeded MA in 1942. In 1938, he entered Cuddesdon College, an Anglican theological college, to under a years training for ordained ministry.

== Ordained ministry ==
Lister was ordained in the Church of England as a deacon in 1939 and as a priest in 1941. He was initially a Curate at St Nicholas Radford. After this he was Curate at St John the Baptist, Coventry and then Vicar of Brighouse. He was Archdeacon of Halifax from 1961 to 1972, when he became Provost of Wakefield – a post he held for a decade. He retired from full-time ministry in 1982.

== Later life ==
In retirement, from 1982 to 2003, Lister held Permission to Officiate in the Diocese of Canterbury. He died on 23 August 2006, aged 90.

Church of England titles
Preceded by Philip Pare	Provost of Wakefield; 1972–1982	Succeeded by John Allen
