= Jonathan Greener =

Dean of Exeter; British Anglican priest

The Very Reverend Jonathan Greener
- Dean of Exeter
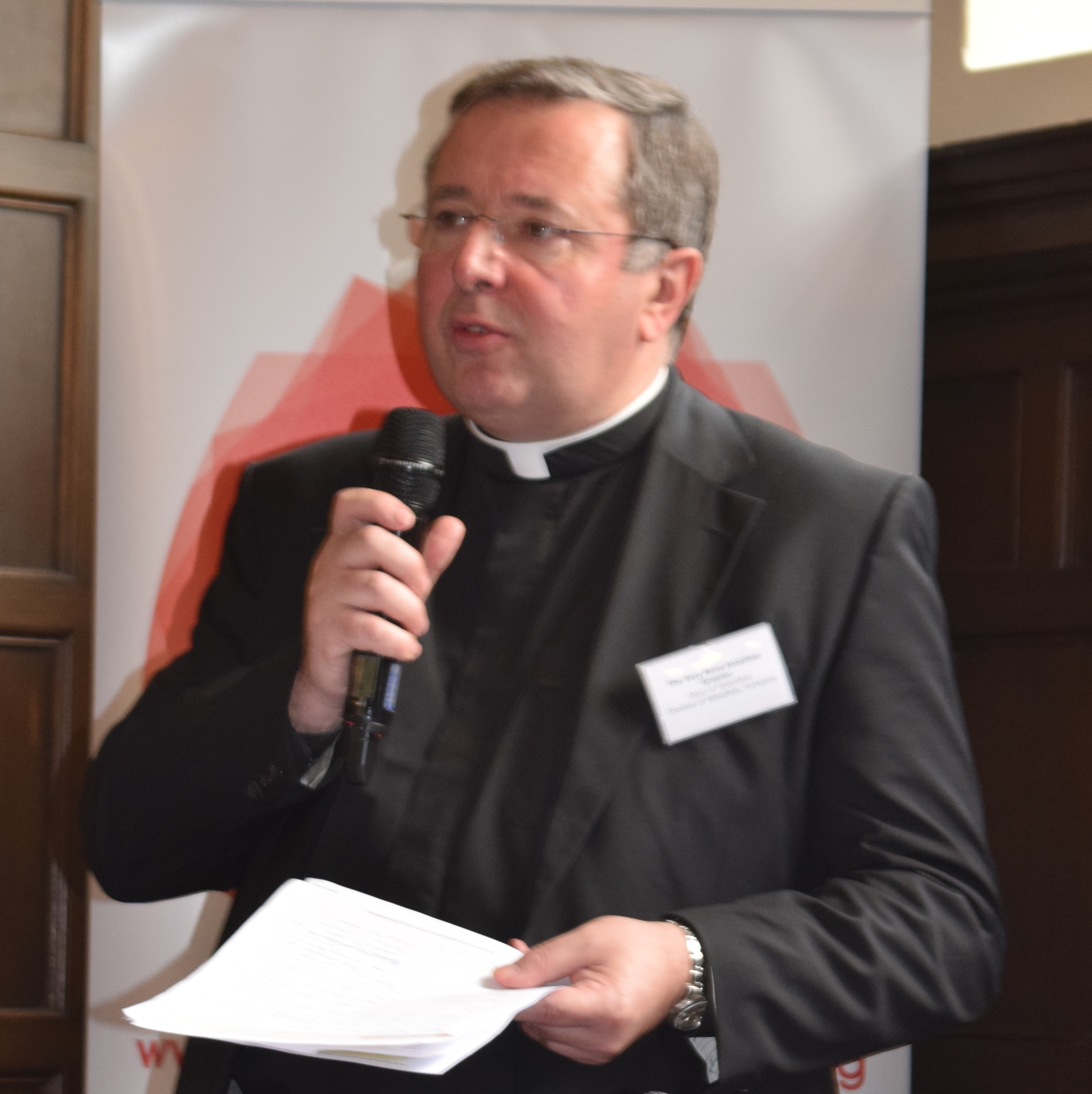
- Greener in 2014
- Church: Church of England
- Diocese: Diocese of Exeter
- In office: 2017–present
- Predecessor: Jonathan Draper
- Other posts: Presiding Dean of the Diocese of Leeds (April 2014–2017); Dean of Wakefield (2007–2017)

Personal details
- Born: Jonathan Desmond Francis Greener; 9 March 1961 (age 65)
- Denomination: Anglicanism
- Spouse: Pamela
- Education: Reigate Grammar School
- Alma mater: Trinity College, Cambridge; College of the Resurrection

Jonathan Desmond Francis Greener (born 9 March 1961) is a British Anglican priest. He was Dean of Wakefield and presiding dean of the Diocese of Leeds. He became Dean of Exeter on 26 November 2017. He will retire from the role in July 2026.

== Early life and education ==
Greener was born on 9 March 1961. He was educated at Reigate Grammar School, a voluntary aided grammar school that became an independent school while he was there. He studied at Trinity College, Cambridge, graduating with a Bachelor of Arts (BA) degree in 1983; as per tradition, his BA was promoted to a Master of Arts (MA Cantab) degree.

After graduating, he worked for five years as a sales and export manager with A & M Hearing; a company run by his father. He then studied for the priesthood at the College of the Resurrection, Mirfield, an Anglo-Catholic theological college in Yorkshire, between 1989 and 1991.

== Ordained ministry ==
Greener was ordained in 1992. He was Assistant Curate at Holy Trinity with St Matthew, Southwark, while Angus Galbraith was incumbent from 1991 to 1994. During this time he organized the opening of the new Church building and community centre "St Matthew at the Elephant" by Diana, Princess of Wales, one of her final public engagements. He then served as domestic chaplain to the Bishop of Truro, Michael Ball from 1994 to 1996. He was Vicar of the Church of the Good Shepherd, Brighton from 1996 to 2003. He the became Archdeacon of Pontefract, a post he held until his elevation to the Deanery in 2007.

Greener appeared prominently in a BBC Four television documentary, Cathedrals, broadcast in November 2013. The programme focused on recent renovations to the cathedral and the impending decision on the Church of England commission's recommendation that the diocese be merged with two other Yorkshire dioceses.

Church of England titles
Preceded by George Nairn-Briggs	Dean of Wakefield; 2007 – 2017	Succeeded by Jonathan Draper
Preceded by Jonathan Draper	Dean of Exeter; 2017–present	Incumbent
