= Order of Brothelyngham =

Fake religious order from 1348

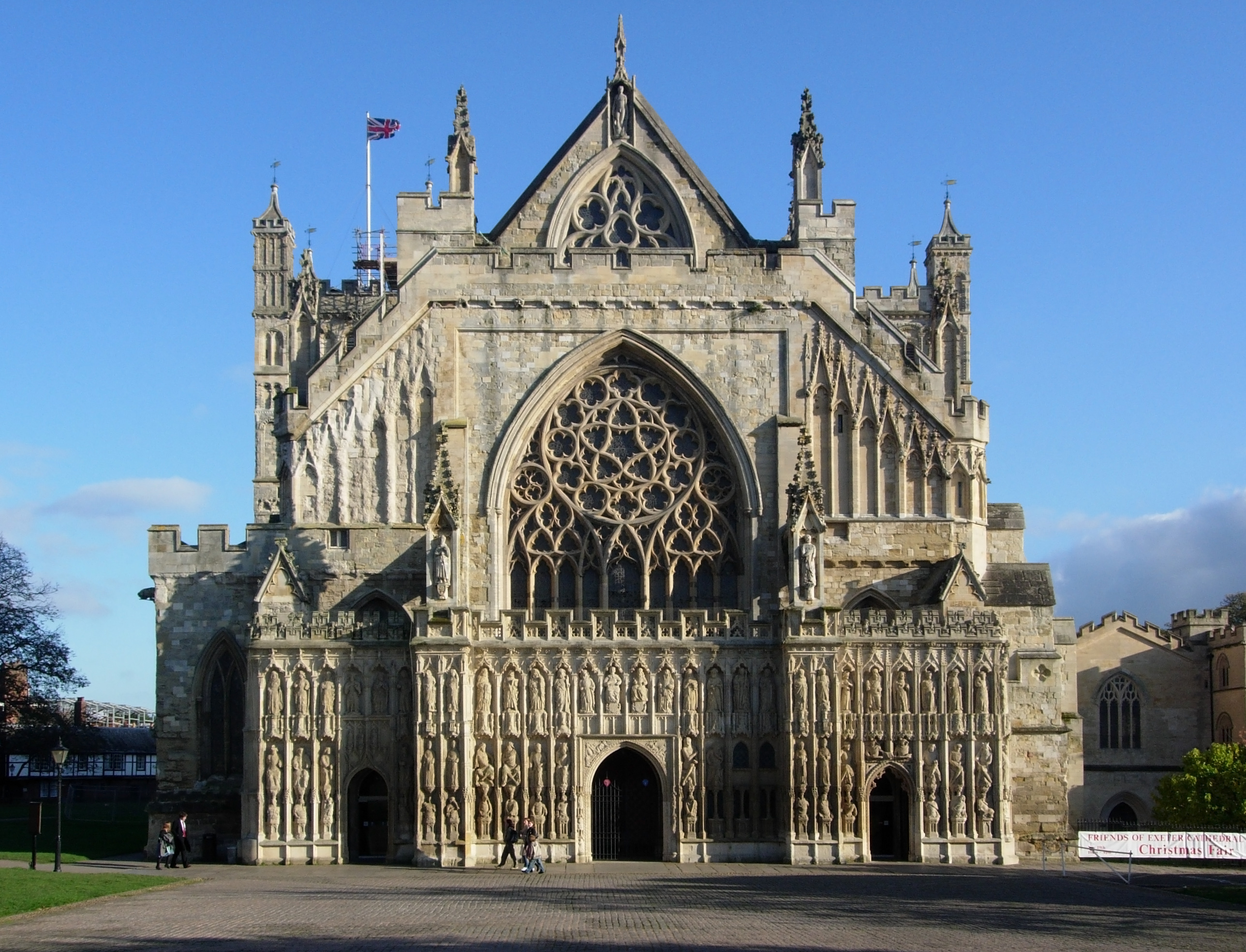
Exeter Cathedral, John Grandisson's episcopal seat as Bishop of Exeter; Grandisson instructed its officials to condemn the Order of Brothelyngham in the city.

The Order of Brothelyngham was a group of men who, in the mid-14th century, formed themselves into a fake religious order in the city of Exeter, England. They may well have been satirising the church, which was commonly perceived as corrupt. Tales of priests and nuns not living according to their religious vows were widespread. The group appears to have named itself after a non-existent place, "Brothelyngham". Such a name would have suggested chaos, wretchedness or some similar context to contemporaries, rather than its modern connotation with a brothel. The men of this fake order dressed as monks, and supposedly elected a madman to rule them as their abbot, possibly from a theatrical stage or throne.

The Brothelynghamite Order caused much trouble in Exeter, regularly emerging from their base—which may have been some form of medieval theatre, or other area of public entertainment—and terrorising the citizens. Bearing their "Abbot" aloft before them, on a mockery of a cathedra, they kidnapped locals whom they held for ransom. They also practised extortion. It is possible that, notwithstanding these activities, they saw themselves as theatrical players rather than criminals. The Bishop of Exeter, John Grandisson, in nearby Chudleigh, issued instructions to his agents to investigate and if they deemed it necessary, to condemn and excommunicate the Order, although the result remains unknown. The bishop clearly expected to find evidence of disobedience and debauchery.

As one of the few such gangs known to modern historians, the Order of Brothelyngham is considered historiographically significant for what it suggests of anti-clerical activities and attitudes in England during the period. The name is generally considered a word play on the Order of Sempringham, which was the target of contemporary gossip and rumour on account of its policy of enclosing both monks and nuns on the same premises.

== Background ==
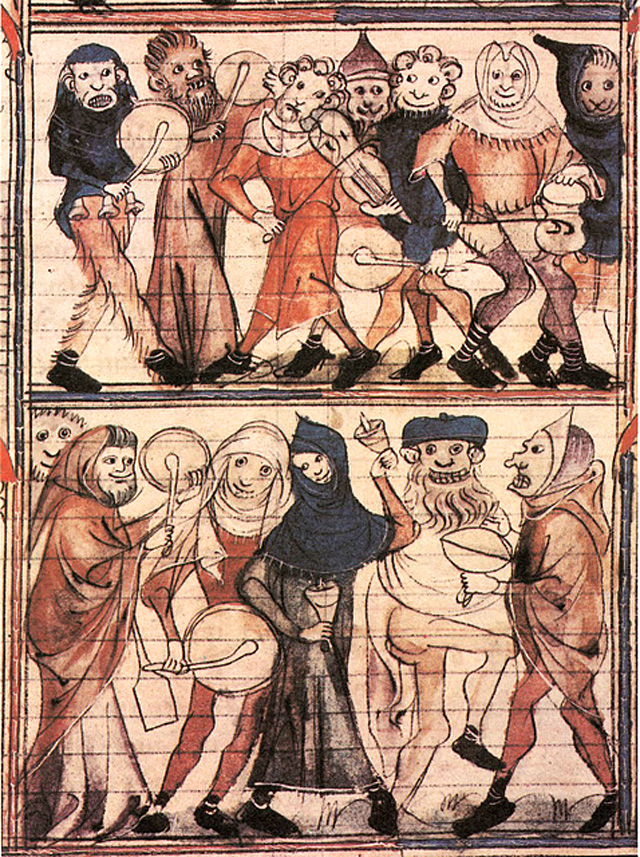
French image of the Feast of Fools taken place at some point in the 14th century, from a contemporary manuscript

=== Socio-religious ===
The Church had waged a campaign against theatrical ludi—or popular games (Note: They originated as part of the Roman Empire's cult of the state, but by the Late Middle Ages were denounced by the Church as loci for the ungodly and easily tempted.)—ever since Pope Innocent III's condemnation of "ludi theatrales" ("theatrical games") in 1207. There he described them as encouraging ludibria, insania, debacctiationes obscoenas ("games, madness [and] obscene debauchery"). The Church was by far the most common target for popular satire; the historian Martha Bayless has calculated that 90 per cent of popular theatrical parodies attacked the Church somehow. The Order of Brothelyngham is considered by historians to have been a pseudo-religious order created in Exeter in 1348 also to satirise the clergy. It was treated by both locals and the establishment with antipathy, even though it appears to have begun life non-violently. Such sociétés joyeuses, or "fool societies", (Note: Scholar Donald Perret has drawn a direct link between the two groups.) while relatively common in France, were rarer in England, argues the scholar E. K. Chambers, and that of Brothelyngham is one of the few known to modern historians. (Note: The literary scholar Enid Welsford has suggested that generally speaking, such fools' societies were "more adapted to the French than the English temperament"; the former very much emphasised the ecclesiastical aspects of their foolery. They granted themselves such parodic titles such as Abbé de Plate Baum (abbot of the empty purse) and Seigneur de la Lune (lord of the moon), notes Katja Gvozdeva. These names and others "are mentioned in connection with the charivari, feasts, and carousing of the fools' societies in the broad context of urban carnival culture". Welsford also notes the similarity between the Order of Brothelyngham and the established old English mythic traditions such as the Lord of Misrule, the Abbot of Unreason, the Christmas Lord and the Twelfth Night King of the Bean.) The medievalist G. G. Coulton has noted that "medieval buffoons often parodied ecclesiastical titles". A similar example to the Order is the boy bishop, whereby a young man—"in a deliberate challenge to the social order"—was dressed in the robes of a bishop and gave quasi-ecclesiastic sermons, on various feast days such as the Feasts of Fools and of Asses. Feast days such as these were specifically intended to mock the church—in the case of the Feast of Fools, over a period of four days—both by its practices and rituals and its hierarchy, and by doing so, celebrate the disfranchised. Ecclesiastical parodies were favoured for their societies (such as the Abbey of Cokaygne) which overturned—albeit temporarily—social norms. They were an early expression of what became known later, in France, as Sociétés Joyeuses. (Note: Sociétés Joyeuses, says Katja Gvozdeva, were theatrical companies often devoted to foolplay and slapstick, visual comedy.) They were also known as "abbeys of misrule"—particularly, comments the historian Katja Gvozdeva, with their emphasis on popular "carnivalesque rituals". The comparison between the Church representing officialdom, and the carnivalesque representing the streets and the poorer classes, as expressed through popular parody, was a Continental phenomenon.

Such groups and their activities were already known of in Exeter in 1333, when John Grandisson, the Bishop of Exeter, had warned his own vicars against making debacaciones obscenas ("obscene remarks") while wearing masque costumes and hiding their identities. He considered their Holy Innocents' Day plays to be scandalous. Although little is known of the groups, the medievalist Lawrence M. Clopper suggests that while often these may have constituted innocent May games, "there seems to have been another game, shared by the young clerici and lay people, that involved tormentors in tattered garments"—again, emulating ecclesiastical robes—or dressed as monks, playing "'somergames' within sacred precincts". One of these summer games, for example, seems to have involved dressing up as the devil, capturing and tormenting those playing the roles of Christ, Peter and Andrew, following which their tormentors received rewards. The spirit behind these activities has been suggested by scholar Bridget Anne Henisch as "limited, licensed anarchy" during which the Church was often "embarrassed by its minor clergy". Grandisson had also mandated against acting and theatres in 1339; from this, Young argues that, by 1348, there was "a lively tradition of popular entertainment in Exeter which only surfaced in the bishops' registers when it spilled over into sacred time or sacred space or made fun of sacred people or things". Grandisson's principal residence was not his Cathedral City, and indeed, comments the medievalist Kathleen Edwards, "in more than forty years [he] apparently never stayed there for one of the great feasts, although he may have occasionally come in for the cathedral services". Max Harris argues—albeit in discussion of Grandisson's 1337 troubles—that Grandisson may not have personally seen the trouble himself or encountered his opponents.

==== Nationally ====
On a national scale, the Black Death had recently arrived in England, probably through Weymouth, Dorset. In response, in a letter known as Terribilis, King Edward III instructed prayers to be said in churches around the country. His letter is dated 28 September 1348, and Grandisson promulgated the royal instruction via the Dean of Exeter, attaching his own thoughts on what was necessary. According to the medievalist Rosemary Horrox, who translated and transcribed the material, he called upon his priests and vicars, "exhorting them with salutary admonitions that those in priests' orders should celebrate mass devoutly". He also "beseech[ed] and order[ed]" them to "arrange solemn public processions through the said city", and requested that he be informed that this had been done by 1 January 1349.

=== Source material ===
The Order of Brothelyngham was brought to the attention of historians in 1897, when Francis Charles Hingeston-Randolph (a 19th-century antiquarian, and prebendary of Exeter Cathedral) published the second volume of his transcriptions of Grandisson's registers; this was part of an ongoing project suggested by his bishop that he should edit the episcopal registers of the diocese. Evidence regarding the Order is scarce and clearly biased. Nothing survives from its creators or members, and the sole source of information stems from a single letter of the Bishop—the Order's avowed opponent—to his staff, filed in the registers. The letter was called Litera pro Iniqua Fraternitate de Brothelyngham, and was promulgated on 11 July 1348. Not only is Grandisson's letter a partisan source, but he would only record events that in his eyes breached canon law, so not necessarily all of the Order's activities might have been recorded. Richard Pearse Chope translated Hingeston-Randolph's transcription of the Bishop's full letter and published it in Devon & Cornwall Notes and Queries in 1921 due to, he wrote, "several points [that] have not yet received any adequate explanation", often because of translation or interpretative differences. (Note: Chope provides examples of such discrepancies among his colleagues; for instance the phrase loco sacrificii had previously been translated as both "in lieu of a sacrifice" but also as "by way of sacrifice".) More recently, portions of Grandisson's registers—including his 1348 letter of complaint—were edited by John M. Wasson as part of the cultural history of Devon of the Records of Early English Drama (REED); the scholar David Grantley, in a review, described the Bishop's "extensive extracts" as being of "enormous significance". Abigail Young provided the translation for Wasson's Latin sources.

== Activities in Exeter ==
=== Name ===
Although the Order claimed to be "of Brothelyngham", this was a fiction; there was no such place. However, the name was not without implication and would have had meaning to contemporaries. They would have understood the word to include the element brethelyng, brethel or brothel, meaning "good for nothing", "chaotic" or "wretched" or "foul", (Note: As used in the 13th-century text, "...brothely [wretchedly] broght to Babyloyn".) rather than a bawdy house. Hingeston-Randolph, who first edited Grandisson's registers, suggested that perhaps their title was bestowed upon the gang by the Bishop himself. Grandisson was indignant, transcribes Chope, that people so worthless would "guiltily laugh at Holy Religion to scorn", as he put it. Wasson translates this as their being "damnably scornful of sacred religion". Hingeston-Randolph appears also to have seen the Brothelynghamites to be more in the manner of a dissenting sect of the Church than a criminal gang. Either way, Grandisson's language made it clear that the group should be stigmatised by Christians. (Note: For example, notes Hingeston-Randolph, at the time, a "bretheling" was a scoundrel, a "brothel" could be a wretched person as well as a place".) Hingeston-Randolph commented:

I must confess that I cannot understand this. There was no such Order, and I believe that there was no such place. I have consulted several well-known experts, but in vain: all were puzzled and interested, but none could help me. The outbreak was, probably, purely local; and it is distinctly stated that these troublesome people had secured the use of the Exeter "Theatre", under the pretence that they were performing a "Play".

The name Brothelyngham was probably a satirical nod towards Sempringham Priory, suggests Chope. Sempringham contained both monks and nuns under the same roof; the scholar Ian Mortimer argues that, as a result, "sniggering in some secular quarters [was] inevitable".

=== Riotousness ===
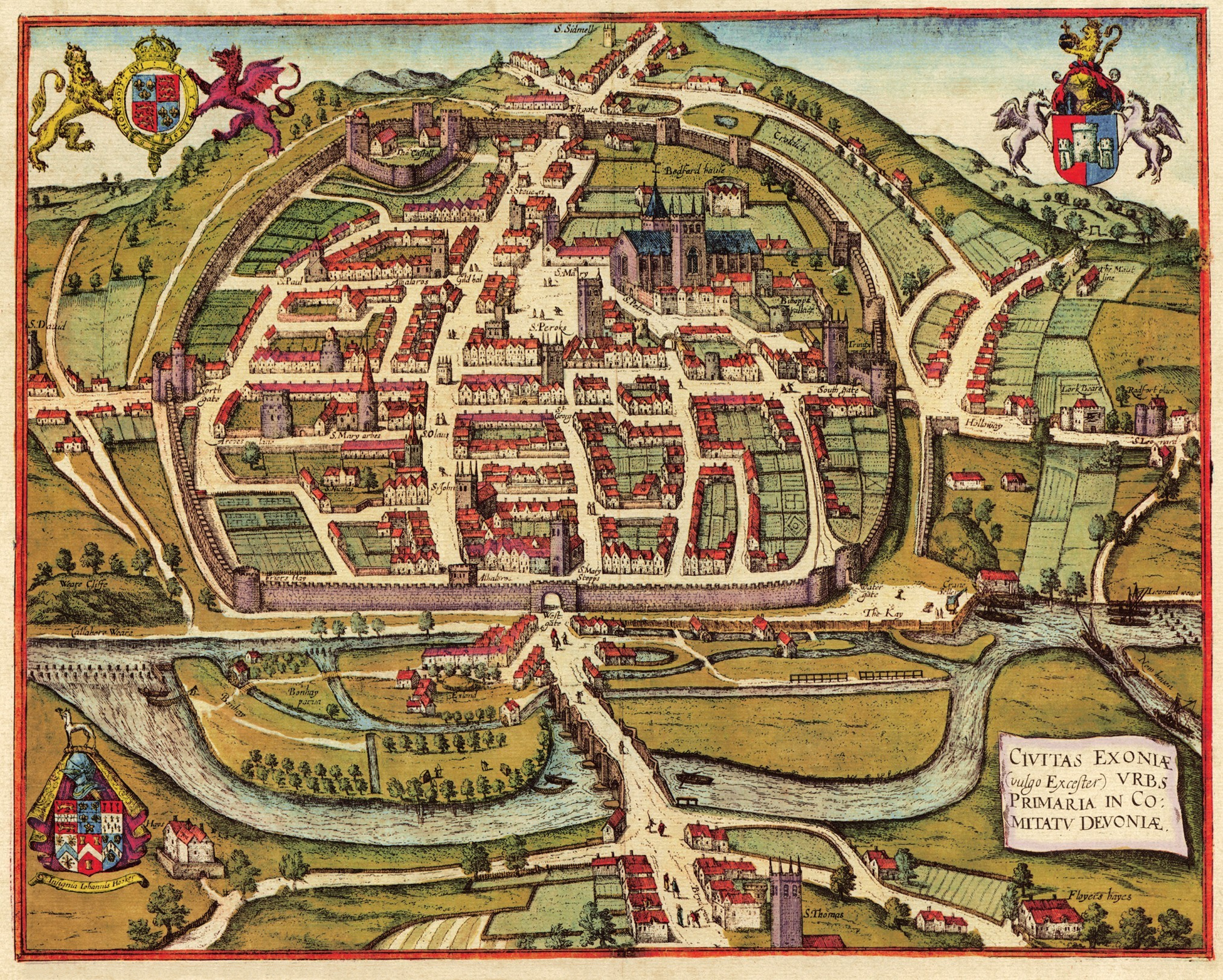
Map of Exeter in 1563

Henisch surmises that it was the Church's very success against its own clergy and their games that led to the adoption of such practices by the laity, as expressed by those in the Brothelyngham Order. This consisted, like most monasteries, solely of men. Although they may have been in the nature of a fanatical religious sect, it is more likely they were composed of disaffected locals, with the object of regaining money they felt was owed them by their Church. There may have been a philanthropic aspect also, as this was a major part in the traditional Feast of Fools.

On repeated occasions throughout 1348 the gang disturbed the peace of the city. On 11 July that year Grandisson wrote from Chudleigh, his main headquarters outside of the cathedral, instructing his chief agents in Exeter—the dean, the archdeacon, and the rector of the cathedral. They were to investigate the Order and its members, whom Grandisson calls "evil persons". The Bishop instructed his men to condemn the Order the following Sunday by means of proclamations in the cathedral and all other churches and chapels of the city. They were to emphasise that those who disobeyed, and failed to publicly withdraw from the fraternity, would not only be excommunicated but met with physical force. The Bishop could—and stated his intention to—call upon the assistance of the city militia if he required.

Grandisson, says Young, believed that "the Order—nay, rather, the horror"—was comparable to "briars and thorns" growing in the field of religion, which needed to be cut away so as to prevent the Church being "dishonoured or disrupted". The historian Audrey Erskine has questioned whether his violent responses to such cults and gangs might reflect something choleric in his character, while Young suggests Grandisson had a Sabbatarian tendency to his approach. His particular focus on the drama as a source of social problems has long been known to historians; as the medievalist John Tydeman argues, Grandisson's "injunctions to his clergy have long constituted a familiar element in histories of medieval drama". However, he also seems to have had an antipathy to any kind of religious innovation in the diocese, opposing both popular religion and the building of new chapels.

Grandisson's instructions to his clerics did not mince words. The scholar J. Kestell Floyer describes it as "a withering blast of sarcasm and indignation". The leader of the Order—whom the members idolised as their abbot—was described by the Bishop, in Coulton's translation, as "a certain crazy lunatic", and in Young's as "an insane and mad man". Having been crowned with a Bishop's mitre, the idiota was enthroned and carried around on a mock-episcopal chair. His followers, in a similar vein, wore monks' habits and used horns to fanfare their abbot, who ruled them from a theatrical stage, in imitation of a Bishop's dais. The horn contrasted with traditional holy bells. The Bishop's use of the word theatre—theatrum—needs analysis, says the historian R. P. Chope, as Exeter possessed no such building in this period such as would be understood in the 20th century. Indeed, Chope points out that even London did not gain a dedicated theatre until the mid-16th century. Instead, Chope suggests that theatrum was a generic word for a stage or anything that could act as a stage when required. Local historian Cecily Radford suggests that it was a wrestling ring, called The Pale, built in 1387, while, more broadly, Marshall suggests that other Early English words such as "public square" could be used synonymously with theatrum.

Debauched in their behaviour, says Gvozdeva, the Brothelyngham men dressed as monks, paraded their abbot around the streets of Exeter on something akin to a litter, and, with their abbot enthroned above them, proceeded to beat up and rob people they met. To the Church, though, they were a criminal gang who, says Chambers, "beset in a great company the streets and places" of Exeter, many of them on horse. They regularly extorted money and kidnapped people, both the religious and laity, from whom they would demand ransoms; Grandisson suggests they robbed from each other's houses when the opportunity presented itself. The scholar Abigail Young suggests that their processions must have involved a large number of people, although it is impossible now to know whether the movement started in great numbers or attracted a crowd as it progressed over the days. Bayless agrees that "medieval parody rarely offers any sophisticated analysis of its target: even at its most critical its aim is not to direct reform but to humiliate the victim", with violence often a first, rather than a last, resort. Grandisson noted that, although the gang called this a ludus, (Note: The Latin word ludi has multiple meanings, ranging from sports and games, to gladiatorial shows, to theatrical performances.)—"under colour and veil of a game, or rather a farce", he says—in his view, "it was sheer rapine". Wasson proposes, for this passage, that "although these things appear to be tried under the colour and guise of a diversion—nay, a derision—it is nevertheless undoubtedly theft, since something is taken from those who are unwilling, and robbery". They were certainly disobedient, and combined with accusations of theft, either would be sufficient to ensure the Bishop's ire.

It is unknown whether they heeded the Bishop's edicts, for despite his earlier threats to excommunicate the Order, no later letter survives suggesting he did so; his letter of 11 July merely places them "in pain of" such punishment should they not obey the ecclesiastical officials. He called the men "a threat to religion, the King and the Church": "not least", comments the scholar Julian Luxford, "to the monks of Cowick and St Nicholas's and the nuns of Polsloe". (Note: Three religious institutions in or close to the city itself.)

== Later events ==
In 1352, Grandisson again wrote to his officials, this time in Totnes and other churches, condemning what he called a group of "disciples of Antichrist". A similar outbreak of anti-clerical fake monasticism in the area, this group of pseudo-monks—describing themselves as an "order of hermits"—occupied Townstal. The men "claimed power by a special papal privilege to hear confession and offer the sacraments" without Grandisson's permission. The same year, Grandisson issued an order, on pain of excommunication, to close down a "harmful" performance—ludum noxium—satirising the city's leather-dressers (or shoemakers), which was causing disturbance. Grandisson condemned the play as being composed "in contumely and opprobrium", or using insulting language and showing scornful contempt.

== Historiography ==
Partial translation of Chope's (1921) transcription of Hingeston-Randolph (1897)	Partial translation of John M. Wasson's 1986 transcription
Not without grave concern has it come to our notice that in our City of Exeter a certain abominable sect of malign men has lately arisen, under the name of the Order, or rather the Error, of Brothelyngham, by the instigation of the sower of evil deeds; which men, forming not a convent, but a plainly unlawful and doubtful conventicle, have set over themselves, under the name of Abbot, a certain lunatic and raver, most fit and proper for their works; and, dressing him in monastic habit, they set him in the theatre (or, upon a stage) and adore him as an idol.	Since it has come to our attention, not without grave disquiet (to us), that in our city of Exeter an abominable sect of some evil persons has sprung up recently with the aid of the Sower of evil deeds under the name of the Order—nay, rather, the horror—of Brothelyngham: which (evil persons), forming not a convent but a clearly unlawful and suspect conventicle, appointed for themselves under the name of Abbot, an insane and mad man, but one extremely well suited to their activities; and, dressing the same man in a monastic habit, worshipping him set in a public place as if (he were) their idol.

The Order's historiographical significance for modern historians, says Gvozdeva, is not that the gang wanted to be proper monks, have an abbot or be part of a mendicant order, but that they took upon themselves the appearance and, in their eyes, the attitudes of one. The historian Martin Heale has described the extent of ill-feeling felt by the general population towards suspected "abbatial greed and luxurious living", which would be against the Rule of their Order. Luxford, meanwhile, has argued that the significance of the Order is what their own expressed beliefs reveal of their own—and probably others'—views of the priesthood: that, for example, "monks and nuns blindly followed leaders, were idolatrous, avaricious, even luxurious (thus 'Brothelyngham')". A comparison with supposed real-life greedy abbots, says Heale, "is hard to mistake". In her study of French late-medieval theatre, Gvozdeva has suggested that the Order of Brothelyngham "demonstrates particularly well the ambiguous relationship between the play, ritual and theatre", noting the theatrical nature of the Order's activities: the members celebrate the investiture of their abbot (whose character is clearly intended to be a burlesque) on trestles (in theatro) accompanied by the sound of horns. It is one of the only known English examples of popular theatrics performed under the guise of religion, argues the Chaucerian Glending Olsen.

== See also ==
- Parody religion
