= Cervulus =

Cervulus is the diminutive of cervus, the Latin name for "deer, stag". It may refer to:

- a historical name of the zoological genus Muntiacus
- Cervula, a Roman-era pagan festival on New Year's Eve
