= Fools Guild =

The Fools Guild is a California based social community that produces total immersion theme parties and other theme events. Members self-identify in some way with The Fool, a role that dates back to medieval times when monarchs and nobles often had their own court jester as part of their household. Fools were more than just comics. The Fool had special permission to be subversive. The Fool could speak the unspeakable, wear the unwearable, and behave in ways that no one else would get away with. The Fools Guild motto is, "In Risu Veritas" – In Laughter There Is Truth.

Most Fools Guild members live in the Los Angeles area, with some in the Bay Area and a few alumni outside California. Though many are actors, artists or creatives, many are simply imaginative souls in a wide range of fields.

== History ==
The Fools Guild started in 1979 at the Renaissance Pleasure Faire of Southern California, where the original improvisational team met while performing as jesters, jugglers, pass-the-hat-acts, and mimes. Originally named by former Pleasure Faire entertainment director Peg Long, The Fools Guild was an improvisational troupe performing at the original Renaissance Pleasure Faire near San Francisco and other Bay Area venues.

Around 1982, the Fools Guild moved south to Los Angeles where they rented a house at 8228 Fountain in West Hollywood. The house had a giant main room and very high ceilings, and the Fools began to host parties, workshops and other performance-centered events. Very quickly a social club of comedic performers evolved and the house became known as the Guild Hall. The house was originally built specifically for parties by the original house builders the Santleys. The Santleys were Vaudeville artists and original members of the Screen Actors Guild. They were also members of the old Hollywood Comedy performers club "The Masquers". The Masquers included silent Film actors and comedy celebrities and they often met at the old 8228 residence.

At the Guild Hall, the Fools events attracted other artists in Hollywood, creating focal point for the emerging "New Vaudeville" scene in Los Angeles. The parties became increasingly ornate, with elaborate themed decor and costumes, and drew a growing roster of local performers, including members of the nearby Groundlings Theatre and The Comedy Club.

In 1987, the Guild Hall was torn down to make room for an apartment building. Guild members protested the development to West Hollywood City Hall but their efforts failed. After a short hiatus, the Guild resumed producing theme parties, now using rented venues. From then until approximately 2010, the central activity of the Fools Guild was producing three parties a year in Los Angeles: Halloween, New Year's Eve, and April Fool's Day.

Since 2010, the Fools Guild has become more subdued, throwing fewer large parties. Every year is different now, but the Guild continues to publish a paper magazine called The Joker, and still crowns a new King (or Queen) of Fools every spring at the Renaissance Pleasure faire in Irwindale.

== Accodales ==
In 1994, The Fools Guild was awarded a Certificate of Merit by the City of Los Angeles for sending volunteer performers into tent cities to entertain survivors of the 1994 earthquake.

In 2004, The American Society of Cinematographers' Technology Committee and the six-studio industry consortium Digital Cinema Initiatives created the ASC-DCI Standard Evaluation Material (StEM) "Mini Movie" as the official image quality reference used to create the requirements and standards for Digital Cinema (Filmed on the Universal backlot with Allen Daviau as director of photography). Then King of Fools Christina Linhardt (AKA Venus Creamus) was hired as casting director for the project, drawing talent almost entirely from the Guild. The Fools Guild is officially thanked in the credits of the StEM movie.

== See also ==
- Feast of Fools
- Lord of Misrule
- The Masquers Playhouse
