= John Grandisson =

14th-century Bishop of Exeter

- Bishop of Exeter
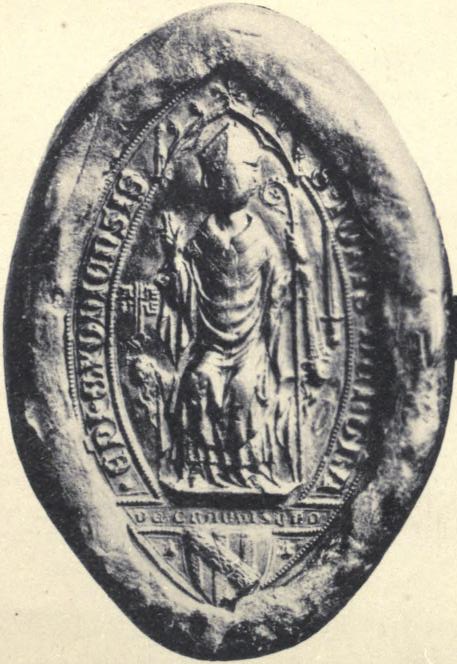
- Seal of John de Grandisson, with legend S(igillum) Jo(han)nis Dei Gra(tia) Epi(scopus) Exoniensis ("seal of John by the grace of God Bishop of Exeter"); Inscribed in Latin beneath the seated figure: De Grandisono, with his arms below and disjointed arms of the See of Exeter at dexter and sinister.
- Appointed: 10 August 1327
- Term ended: 16 July 1369
- Predecessor: John Godeley
- Successor: Thomas Brantingham

Orders
- Consecration: 18 October 1327

Personal details
- Born: 1292
- Died: 16 July 1369 (aged 76–77)
- Buried: Exeter Cathedral
- Denomination: Catholic

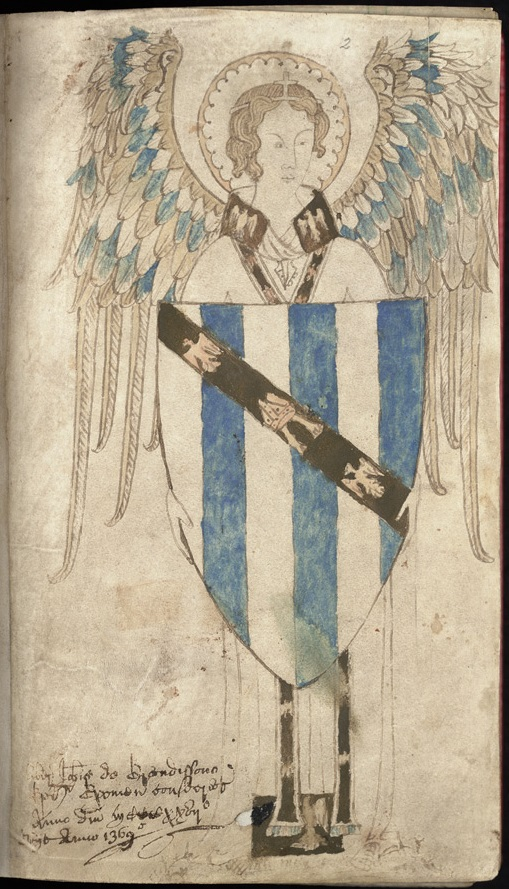
Arms of Bishop Grandisson in his Psalter, held by the British Library. The colours differ from most representations of his arms. The bend is normally gules and the eagles and mitre or.

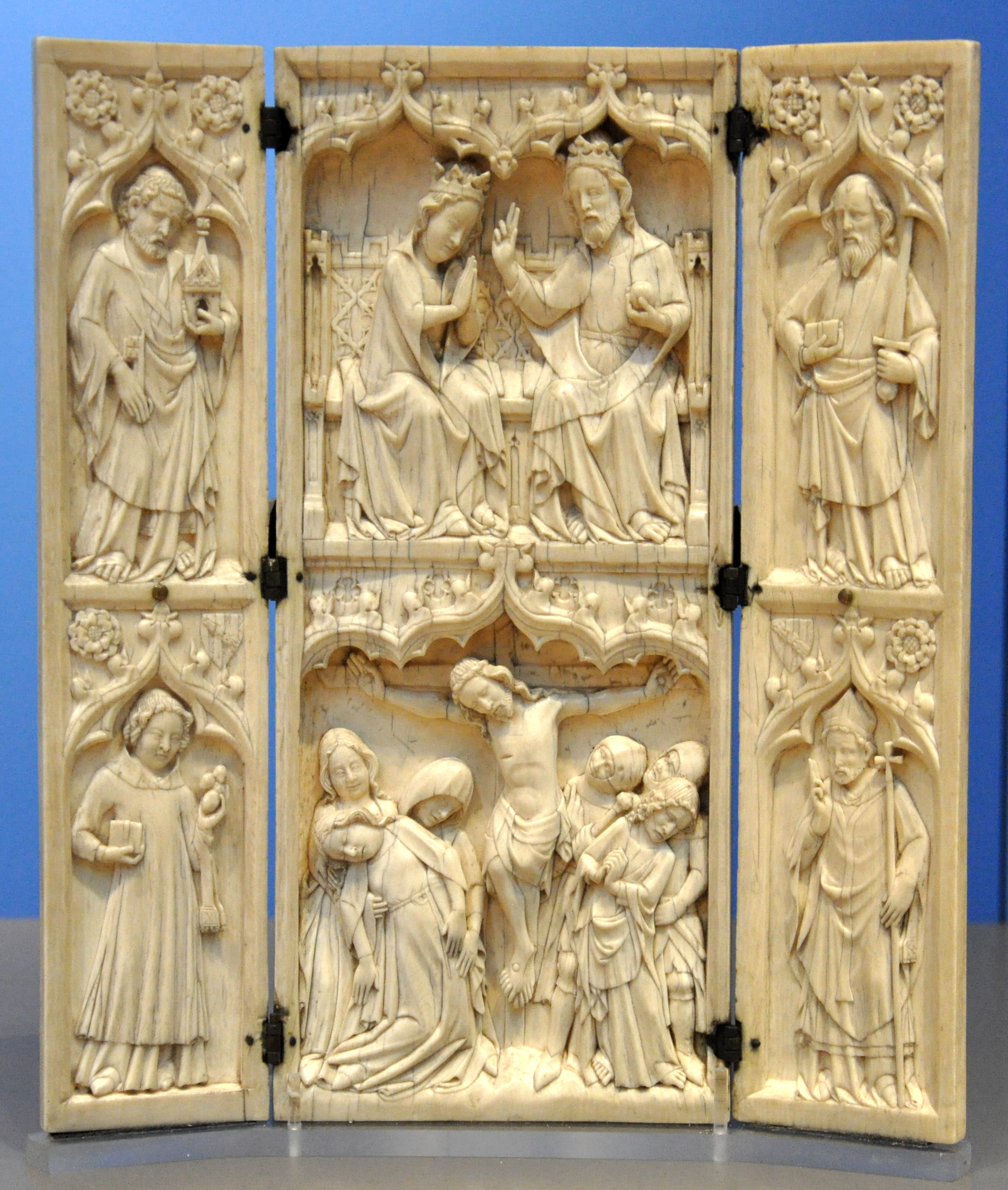
The John Grandisson Triptych, displaying on two small escutcheons the arms of Bishop Grandisson. British Museum

John de Grandisson (1292 – 16 July 1369), also spelt Grandison, (Note: Latinized to de Grandisono. As for example seen on his seal and on the 1299 writ to his father to attend Parliament (G. E. Cokayne, The Complete Peerage, n.s., vol.6, p.60). Literally "from the big noise": de + ablative of grandis-e and of sonus-i (m). The crest of the Grandson family of Grandson, Burgundy from which the Bishop was descended was A bell argent with motto: à petite cloche, grand son ("from a little bell a big noise")) was Bishop of Exeter, in Devon, England, from 1327 to his death in 1369. Several works of art associated with him survive in the British Library, the British Museum and the Louvre in Paris.

== Biography ==
Grandisson was born in 1292 at Ashperton near Hereford, the second son of five of Sir William Grandisson (died 1335). Sir William was the heir of Otto de Grandson (died 1328), close personal friend of King Edward I, and head of the English branch of a family that was based at Grandson Castle, now in Switzerland. His mother, Sybil (died 1334), was a younger daughter and co-heir of Sir John de Tregoz.

He studied at Oxford in 1306, then from 1313 to 1317 he studied theology at the University of Paris under Jacques Fournier, who later became Pope Benedict XII. He returned to study at Oxford 1326–7. Later in Avignon he became the chaplain and friend of Pope John XXII, who mentored him and sent him on diplomatic missions. The Pope rewarded Grandisson by making him prebendary at York, Wells, and Lincoln, and, in October 1310, Archdeacon of Nottingham.

When his elder brother Peter died in 1358 without an heir, John became the head of the family.

=== Bishop of Exeter ===
Grandisson was nominated as Bishop of Exeter on 10 August 1327 and was consecrated on 18 October 1327 at Avignon. His enthronement at Exeter was on 22 August 1328. He then differenced his paternal coat of arms by substituting a bishop's mitre for the central eaglet on the bend.

The Diocese of Exeter was in some disarray after the murder of Bishop Stapeldon in 1326 and the two succeeding short-lived bishoprics of James Berkeley and John Godeley. On his arrival in Exeter, Grandisson encountered a number of problems including debt, hostility from his chapter, and poor relations with Hugh de Courtenay, later to become Earl of Devon. However, his registers record his forceful personality which exhibited itself in his diligent enforcement of discipline, the suppression of abuses and punishment of offenders. On the other hand he took great care for the education and religion of the laity, encouraging interest in St Sidwell and urging the lives of Cornish saints to be recorded. His principal residence was on his manor of Chudleigh and he was evidently an unwilling traveller, only rarely leaving his diocese to attend parliament or an ecclesiastical convocation.

From Bishop Stapledon, Grandisson inherited a partly-rebuilt Cathedral. In December 1328 he consecrated the high altar and then started raising funds from the diocese to complete the nave, of which only the first bay had been completed. He was assisted by master mason, Thomas Witney, who had been working on the cathedral since about 1313. After Witney's death, c.1342, the work was continued by William Joy. Grandisson's main interests for the cathedral were his own chantry chapel, some of the roof bosses (especially the one depicting Thomas Becket's murder – a particular interest of his), and probably the minstrel's gallery.

In 1335 Grandisson founded a College of Secular Canons at Ottery St Mary in Devon, as a choir school for eight boys and a Master of Grammar, which survives today as The King's School. However, his largest project – in which he took a great personal interest – was the rebuilding and establishment as a collegiate church of the church at Ottery St Mary. Taking ten years from 1337, the rebuilding was contemporaneous with work ongoing at Exeter Cathedral and its construction mirrors several features of the cathedral. Grandisson's younger brother Otho helped fund the church and family heraldry appeared widely throughout the building, much of which has been later destroyed or restored away.

Grandisson donated the tenor bell in the south tower of Exeter Cathedral. Named "Grandison" and re-cast at least three times, most recently in 1902 by John Taylor & Co, the current bell bears the inscription "EX DONO IOHANNIS GRANDISON EPISCOPI EXON GVLIELMVS EVANS FECIT 1729".

During his episcopacy, he faced a number of anticlerical movements in Devon. For example, the Order of Brothelyngham—a fake monastic order of 1348—regularly rode through Exeter, kidnapping both religious and laymen, and extorting money from them as ransom. He also outlawed a popular cult that was being promoted by a house of canons at Frithelstock Priory.

=== Death and burial ===
Grandisson died at Chudleigh on 16 July 1369 and was buried in the chapel on the south side of the central doorway of the west front of Exeter Cathedral, a chapel that he had caused to be built. The chapel, dedicated to St Radegund, was defaced and his tomb was destroyed, probably early in the 16th century.

== Surviving works of art ==
There survive two ivory triptychs and a diptych made in England in the 1330s for private devotion and inscribed with the emblems of John Grandisson as Bishop of Exeter. One of them, now known as the John Grandisson Triptych, held at the British Museum in London, is considered a masterpiece of English mediaeval carving. The diptych is in the Louvre Museum in Paris.

An important psalter known as the Grandisson Psalter, owned by Bishop Grandisson, survives in the British Library in London. It records Grandisson's death and the fact that he bequeathed it to royalty.

When Grandisson's looted tomb was reopened in 1956, a small enamelled gold ring was discovered. It shows the Virgin and child and has similarities with enamels created in Paris around the 1330s. It has been suggested that as it is too small to be worn over a glove it may have been one of his most treasured possessions, probably worn hidden from view on his little finger.

== Arms ==
Coat of arms of John Grandisson
Escutcheon Paly of six argent and azure, on a bend gules a mitre between two eaglets or. Other versions These arms are differenced from his paternal arms by the substitution of a mitre for a third eagle on the bend.

== Notes ==
Catholic Church titles
Preceded by John Godeley	Bishop of Exeter; 1327–1369	Succeeded by Thomas Brantingham
