= William Joy =

William Joy (fl. 1310 – 1348) was an English master mason, or architect, of the Decorated Gothic style, known for his work on several English cathedrals.

Joy's cathedral work shows influences of Bristol Cathedral, and he may have originated from that area.

== Early career ==
Joy is first mentioned in the records of the Benedictine abbey church of St Augustine (now Bristol Cathedral) c. 1310, where he may have designed the Berkeley Chapel sacristy. He was next recorded at Salisbury Cathedral, where he created the first of the strainer arches he became known for, designed to stop the collapse of an enlarged crossing tower.

== Wells Cathedral ==
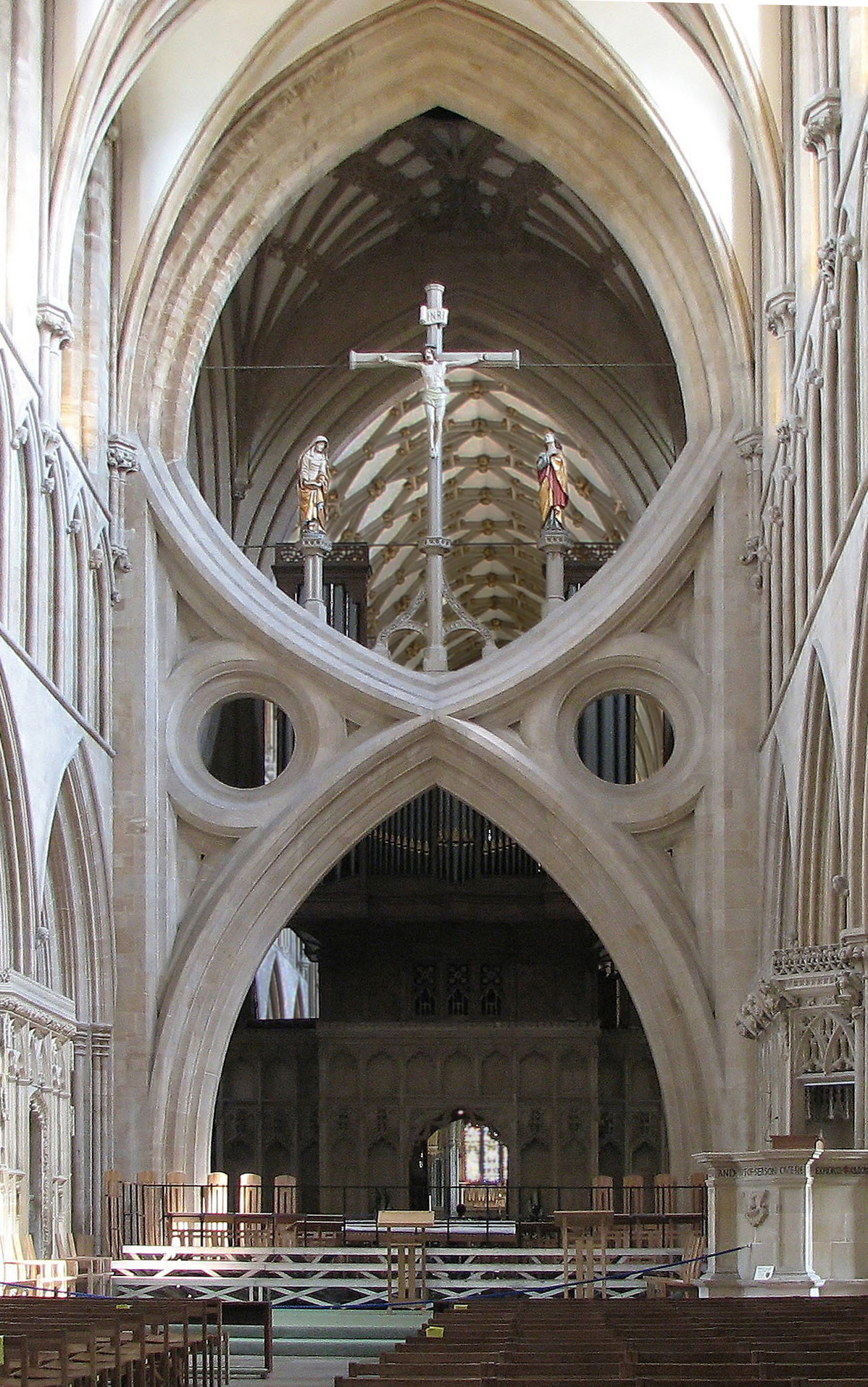
Wells Cathedral: Joy's scissor arches

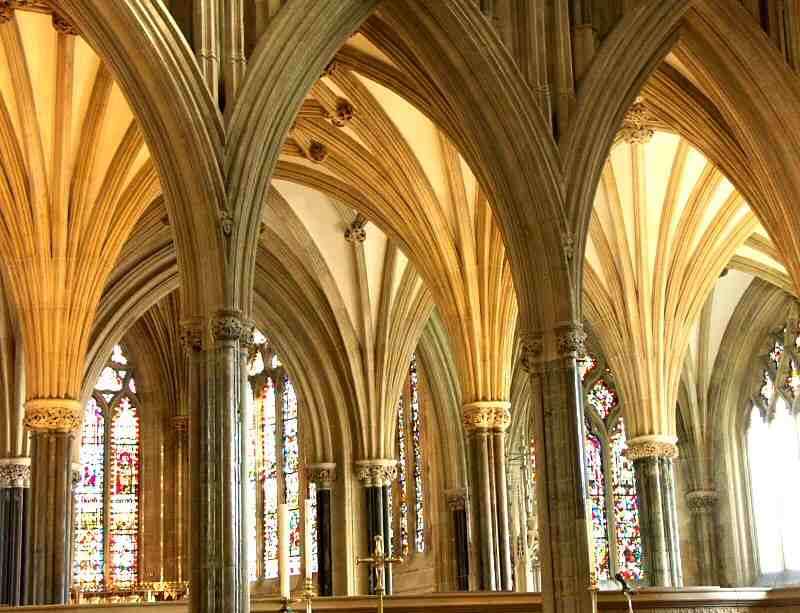
Wells Cathedral retrochoir

William Joy was a colleague of the master mason Thomas Witney, and took over his work at Wells Cathedral in 1329. Joy extended the choir and retrochoir and designed the choir vault. Joy built the scissor arches to prevent the central tower from collapse when cracks appeared in the tower after its height was extended in the 14th century. Several attempts had been made to strengthen the tower, but Joy's unique design has not only held, but decoratively references the Saltire Cross, the cross of St Andrew, the patron of Wells.

== Exeter Cathedral ==
The Bishop of Exeter, John Grandisson, founded a new church at Ottery St Mary, which was built by Joy. In 1342 he was put in charge of works at Exeter Cathedral. Initially he was charged with completing designs by Witney.

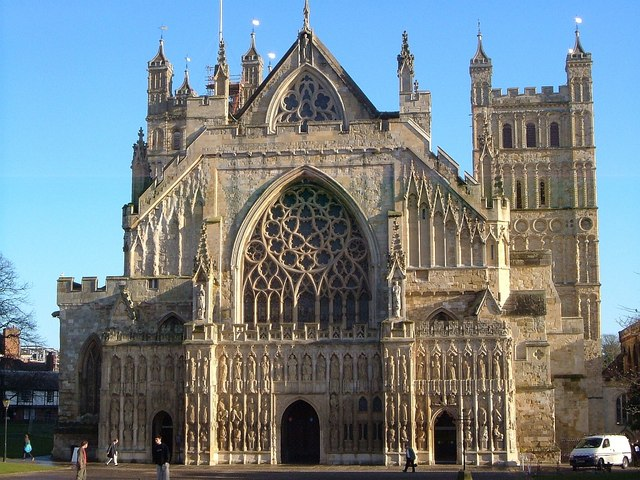
Exeter Cathedral west front

The screen of the west front (illustration) is Joy's design. Consisting originally of two tiers of sculptures in canopies, it covered the original arches and contains the chantry of Bishop Grandisson. The first tier had sculptures of 25 angels, of which 23 remain. The second tier has niches for 25 sculptures of kings and knights. Ten sculptures dating from the 1340s survive today.

Work on the cathedral was halted in 1348 by the Black Death, which struck just before Christmas. As Joy is not mentioned after this date, it is likely that he was one of the victims of the plague.

== Commemoration ==
William Joy's entry in the Oxford Dictionary of National Biography was published in March 2021.
