= John Godeley =

14th-century Bishop of Exeter-elect

- Bishop of Exeter
- Elected: between 5 July and 31 August 1327
- Quashed: 1327
- Predecessor: James Berkeley
- Successor: John Grandisson

Personal details
- Denomination: Catholic

John Godeley (or John Godele) was a medieval Bishop of Exeter elect.

Godeley was elected between 5 July and 31 August 1327, but his election was quashed in 1327.

== Citations ==
Catholic Church titles
Preceded by James Berkeley	Bishop of Exeter; 1327	Succeeded by John Grandisson
