= John Grandisson Triptych =

Ivory triptych carved in England around 1330 AD

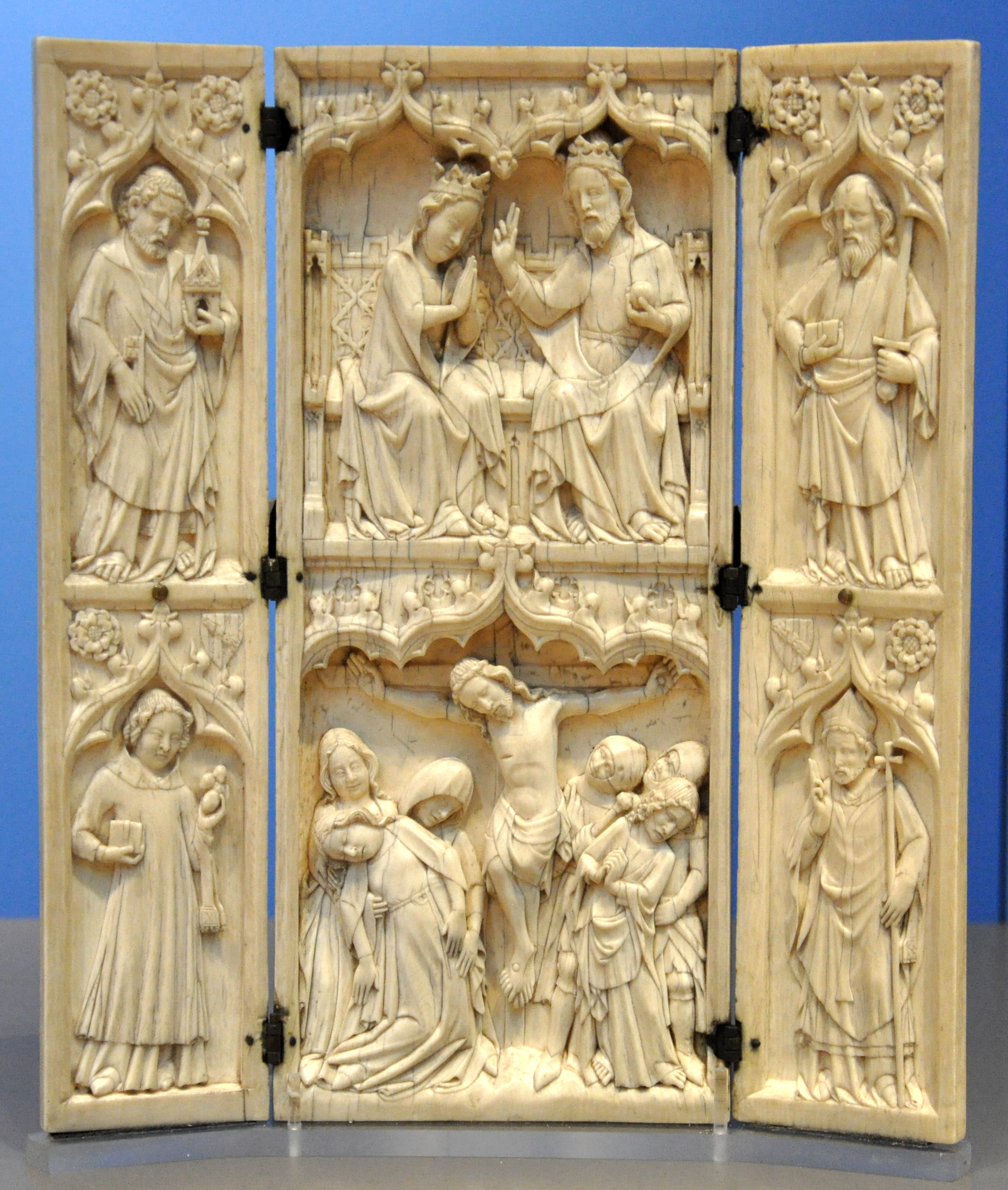
- John Grandisson Triptych
- Material: Ivory
- Size: 23.8cm by 20.6cm
- Created: c. 1330
- Present location: British Museum, London
- Registration: 1861,0416.1

The John Grandisson Triptych is an ivory triptych carved in England around 1330 AD. Since 1861, it has been part of the British Museum's collection.

== Description ==
One of the best preserved English ivories, the John Grandisson Triptych was made between 1330 and 1340. It measures 23.8 centimetres (9.4 in) high by 20.6 centimetres (8.1 in) wide. The triptych is made from three rectangular panels of elephant ivory and folds closed along two sets of three silver hinges. The central panel is divided into two scenes, with the Coronation of the Virgin above and the Crucifixion below. The left and right leaves are similarly split into two scenes, with Saint Peter and his church and Saint Stephen with his stones on the left leaf, and Saint Paul and his sword and Thomas Becket with mitre and crozier on the right leaf. The outer wings are also engraved with John Grandisson's coat of arms. Grandisson regarded Beckett as a hero and had written a biography of him.

== Original ownership ==
John Grandisson, bishop of Exeter from 1327 to 1369, was a man of education, culture, and capital. This example of medieval English ivory carving is unusual because it is carved with the bishop's emblems. Grandisson changed his family's coat of arms by substituting a mitre for the normal central eaglet, making the arms unique to him. His arms appear within an image of Exeter Cathedral, in the psalter of which he was the second owner, now in the British Library as Add MS 21926. The coat of arms almost certainly means that this work of art was commissioned by Bishop Grandisson during his tenure. There is a second ivory triptych in the British Museum and two leaves divided between the British Museum and the Louvre. They are carved with the same arms. The Grandisson ivories in the Louvre and British Museum demonstrate iconographic features that suggest Italian influence and the style of paintings from the province of Siena in Tuscany.

Prior to John Webb buying it on behalf of the British Museum in 1861, the triptych was in the possession of the Russian Prince Aleksey Saltykov. Saltykov bought the artefact in Paris from Louis Fidel Debruge-Duménil.
