= Religion in medieval England =

Aspect of medieval English culture

Richard II presented to the Virgin and Child by his Patron Saint John the Baptist and Saints Edward and Edmund in The Wilton Diptych

Religion in medieval England includes all forms of religious organisation, practice and belief in England, between the end of Roman authority in the fifth century and the advent of the Tudor dynasty in the late fifteenth century. The collapse of Roman authority brought about the end of formal Christian religion in the east of what is now England as Germanic settlers established paganism in the large sections of the island that they controlled. The movement towards Christianity began again in the late sixth and seventh centuries. Pope Gregory I sent a team of missionaries who gradually converted most of the Anglo-Saxon kingdoms, while Scots-Irish monks were active in the north of England. The process was largely complete by the end of the seventh century, but left a confusing and disparate array of local practices and religious ceremonies. The Viking invasions of the eighth and ninth centuries reintroduced paganism to North-East England, leading in turn to another wave of conversions.

The process of conversions led to an explosion of local church buildings and monasteries formed the main basis for the church. Cathedrals were also constructed. These institutions were badly affected in the ninth century by Viking raids and predatory annexations by the nobility. Reforms followed under the kings of Wessex who promoted the Benedictine rule then popular on the Continent. The 1066 Norman Conquest brought a new set of Norman and French churchmen to power; some adopted and embraced aspects of the former Anglo-Saxon religious system, while others introduced practices from Normandy. The French Cluniac order became fashionable and the Augustinians spread quickly from the beginning of the twelfth century, while later in the century the Cistercians reached England. The Dominican and Franciscan friars arrived in England during the 1220s, as well as the religious military orders that became popular across Europe from the twelfth century.

The Church had a close relationship with the English state throughout the Middle Ages. The bishops and major monastic leaders played an important part in national government. After the Norman Conquest kings and archbishops clashed over rights of appointment and religious policy. By the early thirteenth century the church had largely won its argument for independence. Pilgrimages were a popular religious practice throughout the Middle Ages in England. Participation in the Crusades was also seen as a form of pilgrimage, and England played a prominent part in the Second, Third and Fifth Crusades. In the 1380s, several challenges emerged to the traditional theology of the Church, resulting from the teachings of John Wycliffe.

== History ==
=== Anglo-Saxon period ===
==== Paganism and Christianisation ====
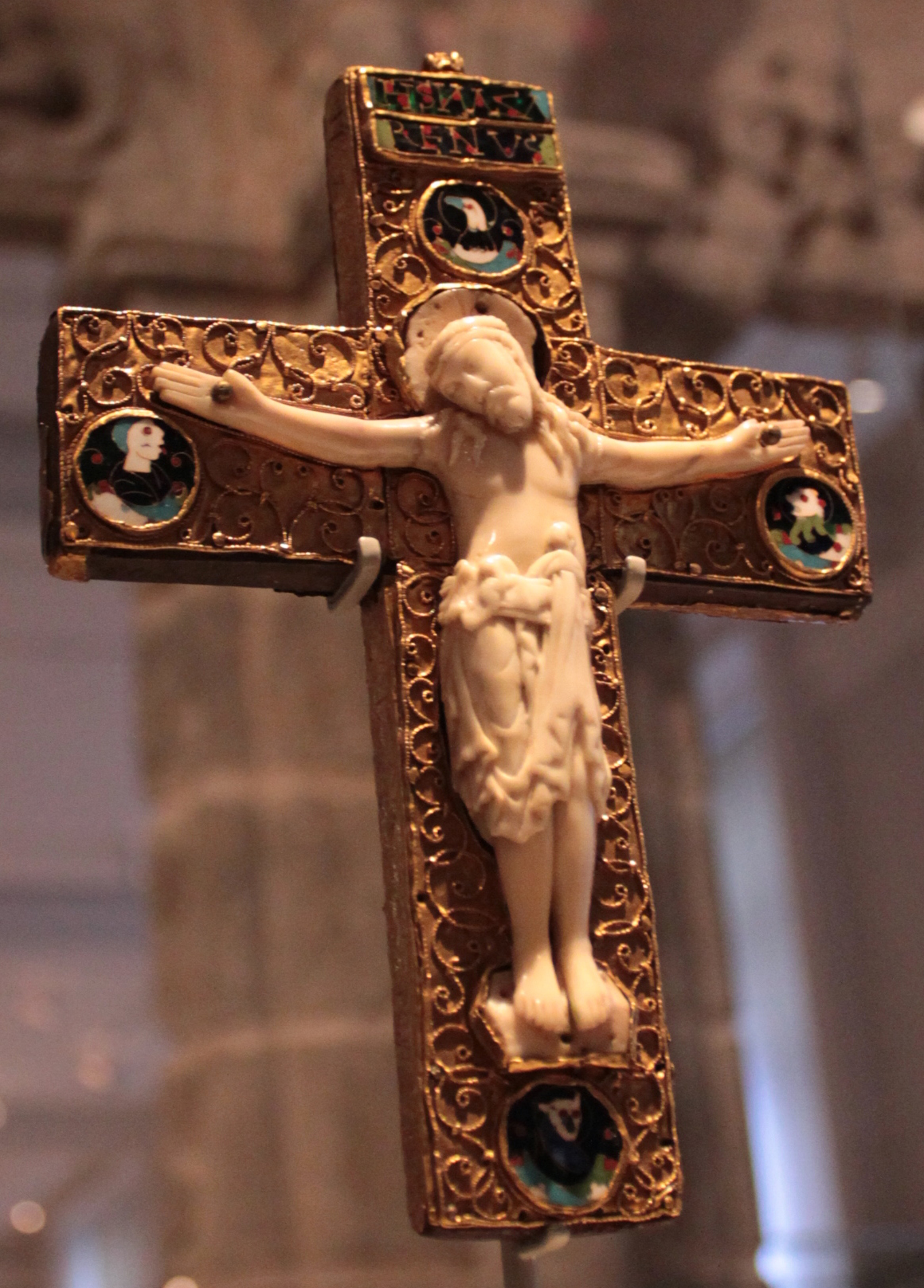
Anglo-Saxon reliquary cross, with English-carved walrus ivory Christ and German gold and cedar cross, c. 1000

After 380, Christianity was the official religion of the Roman Empire. The church in Roman Britain was overseen by a hierarchy of bishops and priests. Many existing pagan shrines were converted to Christian use and few pagan sites still operated by the fifth century. After the fifth century, formal church organisation disappeared in Roman Britain with the collapse of the Roman system and invasions by Germanic pagans. These Anglo-Saxons arrived with their own polytheistic gods, including Woden, Thunor and Tiw, still reflected in various English place names. Despite the resurgence of paganism in England, Christian communities still survived in more western areas such as Gloucestershire and Somerset.

The movement towards Christianity began again in the late sixth and seventh centuries, helped by the conversion of the Franks in Northern France, who carried considerable influence in England. Pope Gregory I sent a team of missionaries—known as the Gregorian mission—to convert King Æthelberht of Kent and his household, starting the process of converting Kent. Augustine became the first Archbishop of Canterbury and started to build new churches across the South-East, reusing existing pagan shrines. Oswald and Oswiu, kings of Northumbria, were converted in the 630s and 640s by Scottish missionaries, and the wave of change carried on through the middle of the seventh century across the kingdoms of Mercia, the South Saxons and the Isle of Wight. The process was largely complete by the end of the seventh century, but left a confusing and disparate array of local practices and religious ceremonies. This new Christianity reflected the existing military culture of the Anglo-Saxons: as kings began to convert in the sixth and seventh centuries, conversion began to be used as a justification for war against the remaining pagan kingdoms, for example, while Christian saints were imbued with martial properties.

Over the next few years, the organisation of the English Church was laid out. While ultimately under papal authority, the church was to be divided into two ecclesiastical provinces, each led by a metropolitan or archbishop. The northern province was based at York, and the southern province was based at Canterbury. The Archbishop of Canterbury had final authority over the entire English Church. This division between the Province of Canterbury led by the Archbishop of Canterbury and the Province of York led by the Archbishop of York remained a permanent feature of the English Church. Controversially, Pope Gregory gave Augustine authority over the bishops of the indigenous Celtic Church. In response, the Celtic bishops refused to cooperate with the Roman missionaries. The Celtic and Latin churches disagreed on several issues. The most important was the date of Easter. There were other differences over baptismal customs and the style of tonsure worn by monks.

King Oswald of Northumbria promoted the Celtic Christian tradition as practiced at Iona, a center of Celtic monasticism. Saint Aidan established a monastery at Lindisfarne. Under King Oswiu of Northumbria, tensions between followers of the Latin and Celtic traditions continued. To settle matters, Osiwu summoned the Synod of Whitby in 664. Both sides made arguments, but the king decided that Northumbria would follow the Latin tradition. His decision was decided on the basis of authority: the successors of Saint Peter outweighed the successors of Saint Columba.

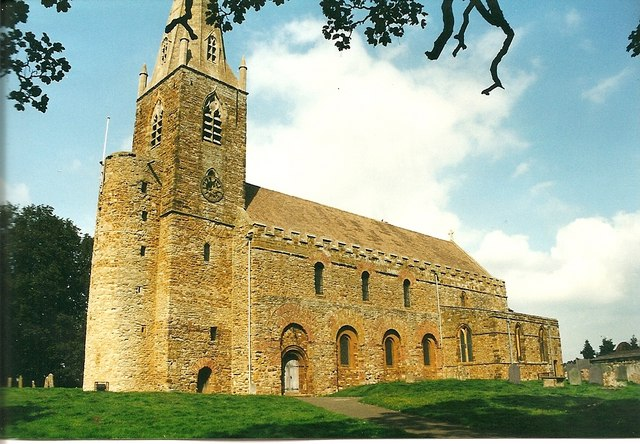
All Saints' Church, Brixworth, built around 680, is an example of early Anglo-Saxon architecture

The Council of Hertford in 673 was the first meeting of bishops from across England. canons were adopted to promote greater uniformity, among these that the English bishops should hold an annual council at Clovesho. It also confirmed the observance of the traditions of the Latin Church over those of the Celtic Church, which had previously held influence in the north and west. A major reorganisation of the English church occurred in the late 700s. King Offa of Mercia wanted his own kingdom to have an archbishop since the Archbishop of Canterbury was also a great Kentish magnate. In 787, a council of the English church attended by two papal legates elevated the Diocese of Lichfield into an archbishopric. There were now three provinces in England: York, Lichfield and Canterbury. However, this arrangement was abandoned in 803, and Lichfield was reabsorbed into the province of Canterbury.

Initially, the diocese was the only administrative unit in the Anglo-Saxon church. The bishop served the diocese from a cathedral town with the help of a group of priests known as the bishop's familia. These priests would baptise, teach and visit the remoter parts of the diocese. Familiae were placed in other important settlements, and these were called minsters. The parish system grew out of manorialism. The parish church was a private church built and endowed by the lord of the manor, who retained the right to nominate the parish priest. The priest supported himself by farming his glebe and was also entitled to other support from parishioners. The most important was the tithe, the right to collect one-tenth of all produce from land or animals. Originally, the tithe was a voluntary gift, but the church successfully made it a compulsory tax by the 10th century.

The Viking invasions of the eighth and ninth centuries reintroduced paganism to North-East England, leading in turn to another wave of conversion. Indigenous Scandinavian beliefs were very similar to other Germanic groups, with a pantheon of gods including Odin, Thor and Ullr, combined with a belief in a final, apocalyptic battle called Ragnarok. The Norse settlers in England were converted relatively quickly, assimilating their beliefs into Christianity in the decades following the occupation of York, of which the Archbishop had survived. The process was largely complete by the early tenth century and enabled England's leading churchmen to negotiate with the warlords. As the Norse in mainland Scandinavia started to convert, many mainland rulers recruited missionaries from England to assist in the process.

==== Unified kingdom ====
English dioceses between 950 and 1035

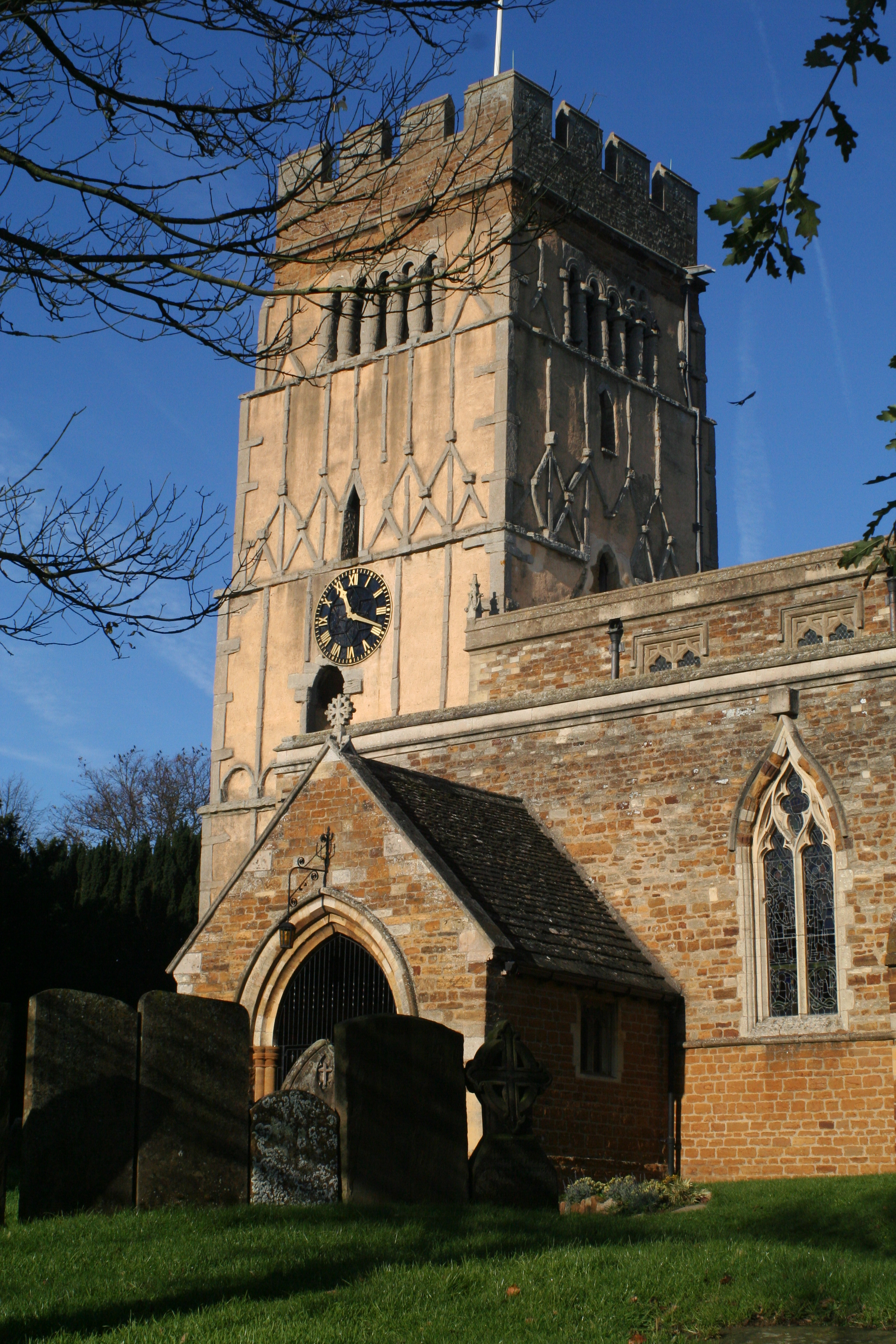
10th-century Saxon west tower and 14th-century south porch of All Saints' Church, Earls Barton, Northamptonshire

Alfred the Great of Wessex and his successors led the Anglo-Saxon resistance and reconquest, culminating in the formation of a single Kingdom of England. The king was regarded not only as the head of the church but also "the vicar of Christ among a Christian folk". Bishops were chosen by the king and tended to be recruited from among royal chaplains or monasteries. The bishop-elect was then presented at a synod where clerical approval was obtained and consecration followed. The appointment of an archbishop was more complicated and required approval from the pope. The Archbishop of Canterbury had to travel to Rome to receive the pallium, his symbol of office. These visits to Rome and the payments that accompanied them (such as Peter's Pence) was a point of contention.

With the conversion of much of England in the sixth and seventh centuries, there was an explosion of local church building. English monasteries formed the main basis for the church and were often sponsored by local rulers. They took various forms, including mixed communities headed by abbesses, bishop-led communities of monks, and others formed around married priests and their families. Cathedrals were constructed, staffed either with secular canons in the European tradition or, uniquely to England, chapters of monks. These institutions were badly affected in the ninth century by Viking raids and predatory annexations by the nobility. By the start of the 10th century, monastic lands, financial resources and the quality of monasteries' religious work had been much diminished.

Reforms followed under the English kings who promoted the Benedictine rule then popular on the Continent. When Edgar the Peaceful became king in 959, there was only one Benedictine monastery in England, Glastonbury Abbey led by Dunstan. The king and Dunstan, who he appointed Archbishop of Canterbury, worked together to promote Benedictine Reform throughout England. As national institutions owning land throughout England, royally controlled and funded monasteries diminished the power of local ealdormen. A reformed network of around 40 monastic institutions across the south and east of England, under the protection of the king, helped reestablish royal control over the reconquered Danelaw.

By the 10th century, the parish system was well established. The parish church was still the property of a local lord, but in towns and the Danelaw the people had acquired ownership. Parish priests were typically local men with a basic education. Many of them were married (especially in the North), but priestly celibacy was becoming more common. For the literate, there was an abundance of vernacular religious literature, such as the Blickling homilies and the writings of Ælfric.

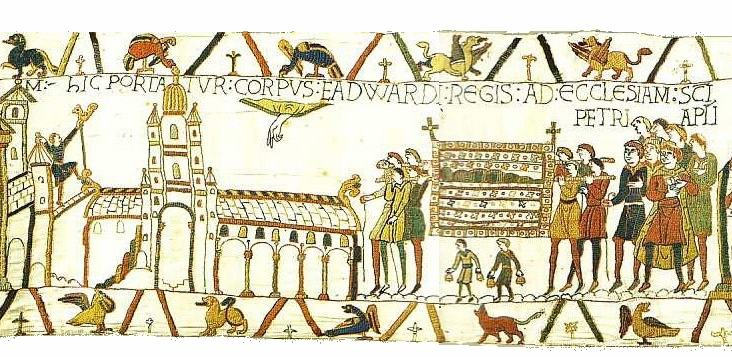
Edward the Confessor's Westminster Abbey, depicted in the Bayeux Tapestry

In 1000, there were eighteen dioceses in England. In the province of Canterbury: Canterbury, Rochester, London, Winchester, Dorchester, Ramsbury, Sherborne, Selsey, Lichfield, Hereford, Worcester, Crediton, Cornwall, Elmham, Lindsey, and Wells. In the province of York: York and Durham. To assist bishops in supervising the parishes and monasteries within their dioceses, the office of archdeacon was created. Once a year, the bishop would summon parish priests to the cathedral for a synod.

In the 1050s, Edward the Confessor rebuilt Westminster Abbey as his burial place. It was modeled on Jumièges Abbey and other Norman churches and was the largest, grandest church building in England. The king's decision to be buried at Westminster rather than at the traditional site of Winchester was part of the process whereby London became the center of English political life.

=== Post-Conquest ===
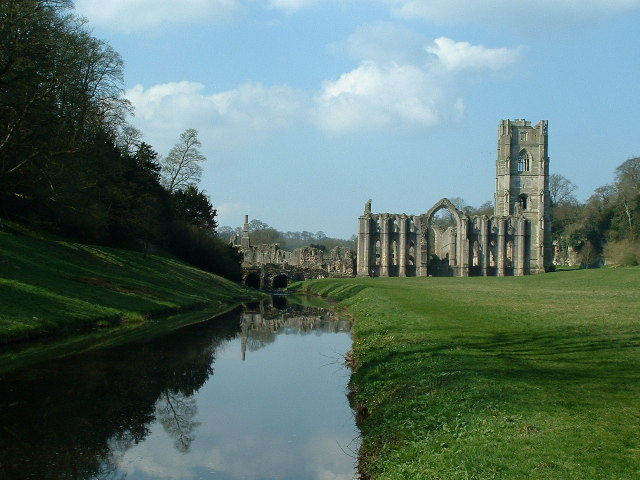
Fountains Abbey, one of the new Cistercian monasteries built in the twelfth century

In 1066, William, Duke of Normandy, invaded England with the blessing of Pope Alexander II. The pope also ordered English clergy to submit to William's authority. Control over the church was an important element in the Norman Conquest of England. In 1070, two papal legates arrived in England to oversee the reform of the church. The legates purged the English episcopate of bishops deemed incompetent, sexually immoral, or who had been appointed by antipopes. This aligned with William's goal of removing unreliable church officials. Afterwards, only two English bishops remained. Lanfranc of Bec was made Archbishop of Canterbury and Thomas of Bayeux was made Archbishop of York.

Some of these Norman and French churchmen adopted and embraced aspects of the former Anglo-Saxon religious system, while others introduced practices from Normandy. Extensive English lands were granted to monasteries in Normandy, allowing them to create daughter priories and monastic cells across the kingdom. The monasteries were brought firmly into the web of feudal relations, with their holding of land linked to the provision of military support to the crown. The Normans adopted the Anglo-Saxon model of monastic cathedral communities, and within seventy years, the majority of English cathedrals were controlled by monks; every English cathedral, however, was rebuilt to some extent by the new rulers. England's bishops remained powerful temporal figures, and in the early twelfth century, raised armies against Scottish invaders and built up extensive holdings of castles across the country.

New religious orders began to be introduced into England. As ties to Normandy waned, the French Cluniac order became fashionable and their houses were introduced in England. The Augustinians spread quickly from the beginning of the twelfth century, while later in the century the Cistercians reached England, creating houses with a more austere interpretation of the monastic rules and building the great abbeys of Rievaulx and Fountains. By 1215, there were over 600 monastic communities in England, but new endowments slowed during the thirteenth century, creating long-term financial problems for many institutions. The Dominican and Franciscan friars arrived in England during the 1220s, establishing 150 friaries by the end of the thirteenth century; these mendicant orders rapidly became popular, particularly in towns, and heavily influenced local preaching. The religious military orders that became popular across Europe from the twelfth century acquired possessions in England, including the Templars, Teutonic Knights and Hospitallers.

== Belief and practice ==
=== Church interiors ===
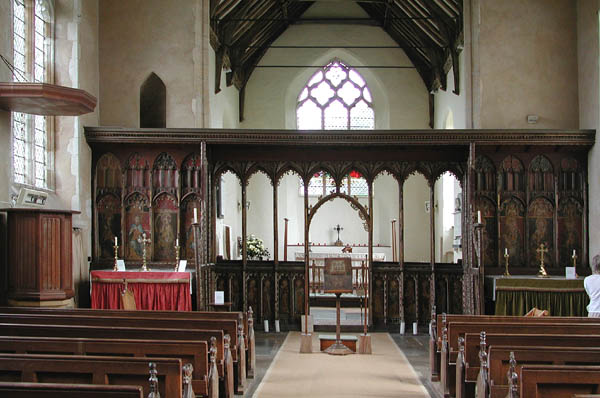
The rood screen at Church of St Helen, Ranworth, Norfolk

Medieval churches were divided into two main sections: the nave where the congregation gathered and the chancel at the east end of the building. The chancel, considered the most sacred part of the church, included the sanctuary where the high altar was located. Beneath the chancel arch, a rood screen blocked the chancel off from the nave. Made of wood, the rood screen included a door and gaps through which the congregation could glimpse into the nave. The rood screen was a visible symbol of the division between the clergy and the laity. Dominating the church was the rood or crucifix mounted above the rood screen. The life-sized image of Christ on the cross was flanked by carved images of the Virgin Mary and the apostle John.

Walls featured colorful paintings illustrating the doctrines of creation, incarnation, atonement, penance, purgatory and judgement. In a time of high illiteracy, these images acted as "books for laymen". One such image was the doom painting above the chancel arch. The doom depicted the Last Judgment, showing Christ in glory, the resurrection of the dead, the saved being welcomed into Heaven, and the damned being dragged to Hell.

=== Liturgy and worship ===
The Mass was at the heart of medieval religion. In the Mass, the priest offered bread and wine on the altar, and, according to the doctrine of transubstantiation, the bread and wine miraculously became the body and blood of Christ, though not in outward appearance. Theologically, this meant that when Christians ate sacramental bread (called the host), Christ became part of them. The Church also taught that the Mass was a sacrifice—the same sacrifice of Christ on the cross—and a means of grace in which forgiveness, salvation and healing were obtained.

Apart from the homily and bidding prayers, the priest spoke or sang the Mass entirely in Latin, which few people understood; however "they knew what it signified." In any case, the priest said much of the mass' prayers in a low voice to God, not for the hearing of those in the nave. Apart from the common prayers of the Creed and Lord's Prayer, when responses were required, these were provided by the choir or the acolytes in the chancel. Most singing was performed by choirs in plainchant or polyphony. While the priest performed the liturgy, the laity prayed and moved around the building (few churches had pews). They could pray at a side altar dedicated to a particular saint. Those who were literate might use a Book of Hours, which adapted the daily monastic liturgy for use by laymen.

The most important part of the Mass was the elevation of the host, allowing the congregation to adore the body of Christ. It was a common belief that to gaze upon the host protected one from sudden death for the rest of that day. While the priest always took communion during the Mass, the laity were only required to receive communion at Easter or major holy days. Preparation for receiving communion included fasting and making full confession of sin to a priest who assigned penance and then pronounced absolution. The communicant entered the chancel through the rood screen and knelt before the priest who placed the host directly into their mouth, so that their hands would not touch it. From the 12th or 13th century, laity generally were not offered the sacramental wine; only the priest received communion in both kinds.

Historian Alec Ryrie notes, "Sermons at Mass were unusual." However, they were becoming more common by the 16th century. Some clergy delivered brief vernacular homilies at Sunday Mass. Most priests were not trained preachers, and clergy needed to have a special license from the bishop in order to preach long sermons. Parishes sometimes heard sermons from visiting friars or other preachers. Each parish was supposed to hear a sermon at least four times annually, but whether this happened depended on how isolated the parish was geographically.

=== Pilgrimage ===
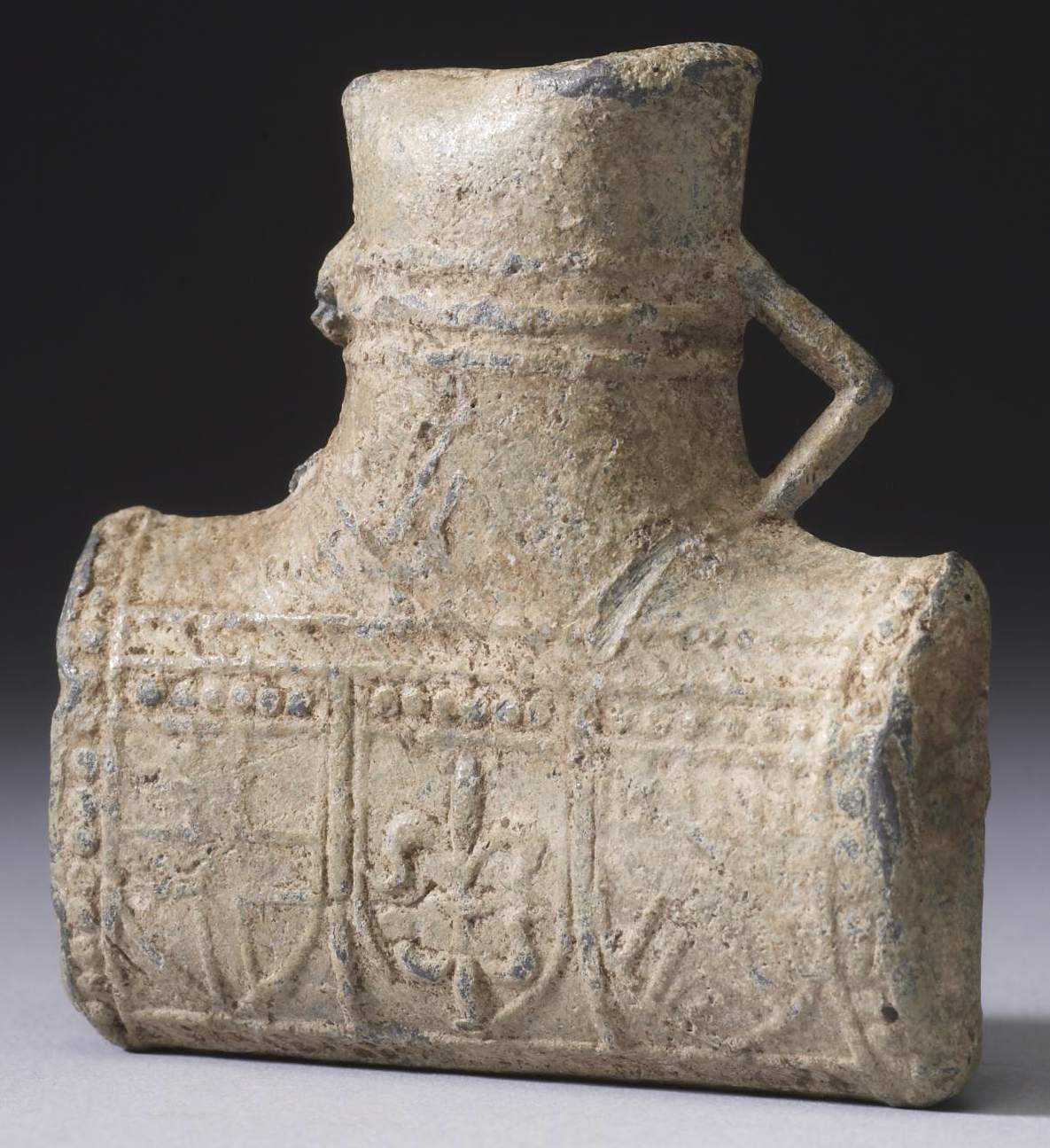
A pilgrim's flask, carried as a protective talisman, containing holy water from the shrine of Thomas Becket in Canterbury Cathedral

Pilgrimages were a popular religious practice throughout the Middle Ages in England. Typically pilgrims would travel short distances to a shrine or a particular church, either to do penance for a perceived sin, or to seek relief from an illness or other condition. Some pilgrims travelled further, either to more distant sites within Britain or, in a few cases, onto the continent.

During the Anglo-Saxon period, many shrines were built on former pagan sites which became popular pilgrimage destinations, while other pilgrims visited prominent monasteries and sites of learning. Senior nobles or kings would travel to Rome, which was a popular destination from the seventh century; sometimes these trips were a form of convenient political exile. Under the Normans, religious institutions with important shrines, such as Glastonbury, Canterbury and Winchester, promoted themselves as pilgrimage destinations, maximising the value of the historic miracles associated with the sites. Accumulating relics became an important task for ambitious institutions, as these were believed to hold curative powers and lent status to the site. By the twelfth century reports of posthumous miracles by local saints were becoming increasingly common in England, adding to the attractiveness of pilgrimages to prominent relics. Major shrines in the late Middle Ages included those of Thomas Becket at Canterbury, Edward the Confessor, at Westminster Abbey, Hugh of Lincoln, William of York, Edmund Rich, Archbishop of Canterbury, who was buried at Pontigny Abbey in France, Richard of Chichester, Thomas Cantilupe of Hereford, St Osmund of Salisbury and John of Bridlington.

Participation in the Crusades was also seen as a form of pilgrimage, and the same Latin word, peregrinatio, was sometimes applied to both activities. While English participation in the First Crusade between 1095 and 1099 was limited, England played a prominent part in the Second, Third and Fifth Crusades over the next two centuries, with many crusaders leaving for the Levant during the intervening years. The idea of undertaking a pilgrimage to Jerusalem was not new in England, however, as the idea of religiously justified warfare went back to Anglo-Saxon times. Many of those who took up the Cross to go on a Crusade never actually left, often because the individual lacked sufficient funds to undertake the journey. Raising funds to travel typically involved crusaders selling or mortgaging their lands and possessions, which affected their families and, at times, considerably affected the economy as a whole.

=== Lollardy ===
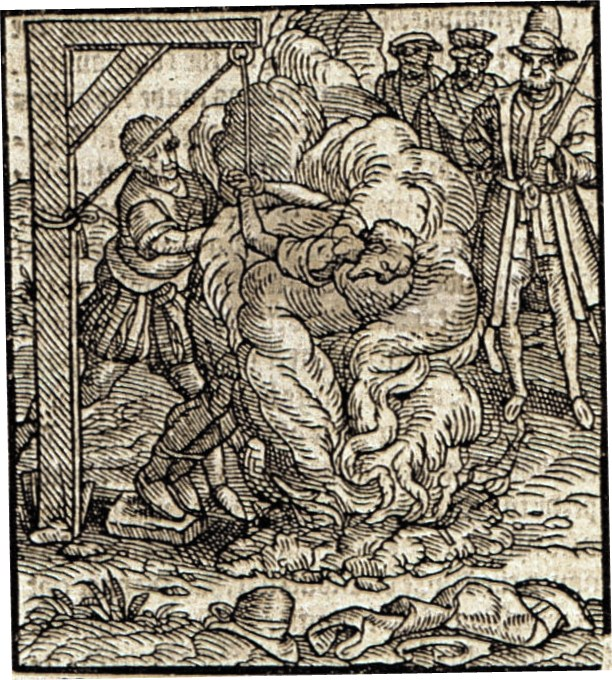
Sir John Oldcastle being burnt for insurrection and Lollard heresy

In the 1380s, several challenges emerged to the traditional teachings of the Church, resulting from the teachings of John Wycliffe, a member of Oxford University. Wycliffe argued that scripture was the best guide to understanding God's intentions, and that the superficial nature of the liturgy, combined with the abuses of wealth within the Church and the role of senior churchmen in government, distracted from that study. A loose movement that included many members of the gentry pursued these ideas after Wycliffe's death in 1384 and attempted to pass a Parliamentary bill in 1395: the movement was rapidly condemned by the authorities and was termed "Lollardy". The English bishops were charged with controlling and countering this trend by disrupting Lollard preachers and enforcing the teaching of suitable sermons in local churches. By the early fifteenth century, combating Lollard teachings had become a key political issue, championed by Henry IV and his Lancastrian followers, who used the powers of both the church and state to combat the heresy. Events came to a head in 1414 at the beginning of the reign of Henry V when Sir John Oldcastle, a suspected Lollard, escaped from imprisonment, prompting a planned rising in London. However, the authorities learned of the plans and arrested the conspirators, resulting in a further round of political trials and persecutions. Oldcastle was captured and executed in 1417 and Lollardy continued as a secret minority sect.

== Church and state ==
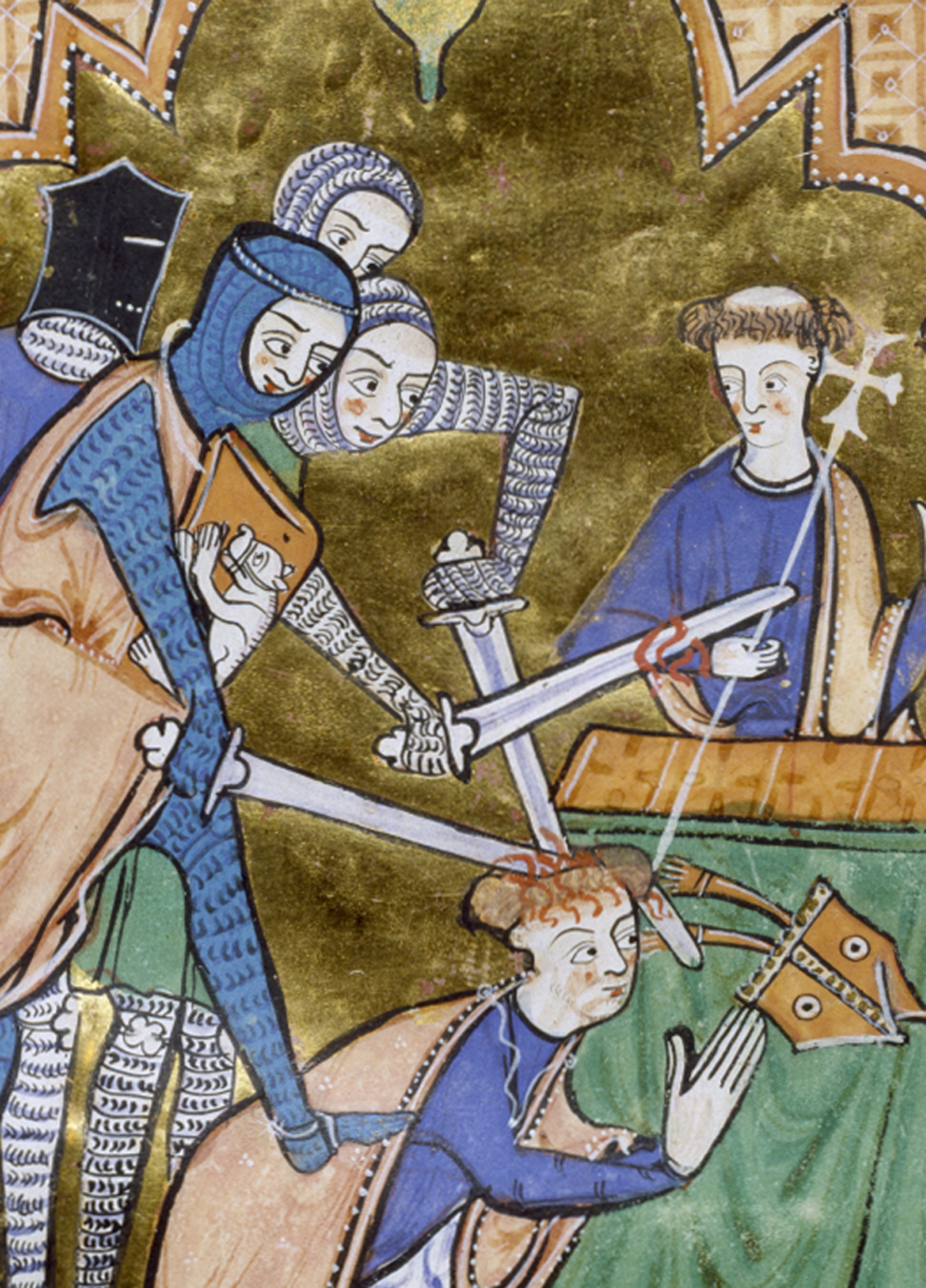
Mid-thirteenth-century depiction of the death of Archbishop Thomas Becket

The Church had a close relationship with the English state throughout the Middle Ages. The bishops and major monastic leaders played an important part in national government, having key roles on the king's council. Bishops often oversaw towns and cities, managing local taxation and government. This frequently became untenable with the Viking incursions of the ninth century, and in locations such as Worcester the local bishops came to new accommodations with the local ealdormen, exchanging some authority and revenue for assistance in defence. The early English church was racked with disagreement on doctrine, which was addressed by the Synod of Whitby in 664; some issues were resolved, but arguments between the archbishops of Canterbury and York as to which had primacy across Britain began shortly afterwards and continued throughout most of the medieval period.

William the Conqueror acquired the support of the Church for the invasion of England by promising ecclesiastical reform. William promoted celibacy amongst the clergy and gave ecclesiastical courts more power but also reduced the Church's direct links to Rome and made it more accountable to the king. Tensions arose between these practices and the reforming movement of Pope Gregory VII, which advocated greater autonomy from royal authority for the clergy, condemned the practice of simony and promoted greater influence for the papacy in church matters. Despite the bishops continuing to play a major part in royal government, tensions emerged between the kings of England and key leaders within the English Church. Kings and archbishops clashed over rights of appointment and religious policy, and successive archbishops including Anselm, Theobald of Bec, Thomas Becket and Stephen Langton were variously forced into exile, arrested by royal knights or even killed. By the early thirteenth century, however, the church had largely won its argument for independence, answering almost entirely to Rome.

Bishops held considerable secular responsibilities. As tenants-in-chief of the crown, they were responsible for providing a quota of armed knights for the king's army. Although they weren't expected to be involved in actual combat, several bishops became active military leaders; an example is Thurstan, Archbishop of York, who mustered the army that defeated the Scots at the Battle of the Standard in 1138. Bishops were also responsible for administering their huge estates and presiding in the courts that dealt with civil disputes within them. They were also required to attend royal councils, and with the development of the Parliament of England in the 13th century, the two archbishops and nineteen bishops were required to take their seats in the House of Lords, along with the abbots and priors of the largest religious houses; collectively, they were known as the Lords Spiritual.

== Judaism ==
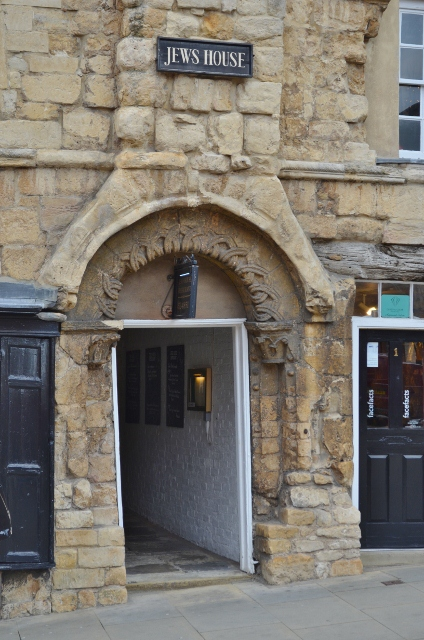
The late 12th century Jew's House in Lincoln.

The first substantial Jewish population in England arrived after the Norman Conquest, reportedly migrating from Rouen in Normandy. By the mid-12th century, there were Jewish communities in most of England's major cities. Although there were violent anti-Jewish massacres and riots in several cities, Jews were theoretically under the protection of the Crown because of their financial importance. However, in 1275, King Edward I passed the Statute of Jewry, which compelled Jews to be identified by a yellow badge and outlawed usury, the lending of money for interest, which was the main source of income for many Jewish families. Following increasing state persecution and attempts to force conversion to Christianity, Edward finally expelled all Jews from England in 1290.
