= The Masquers Playhouse =

Coordinates: 37.926789°N 122.384364°W

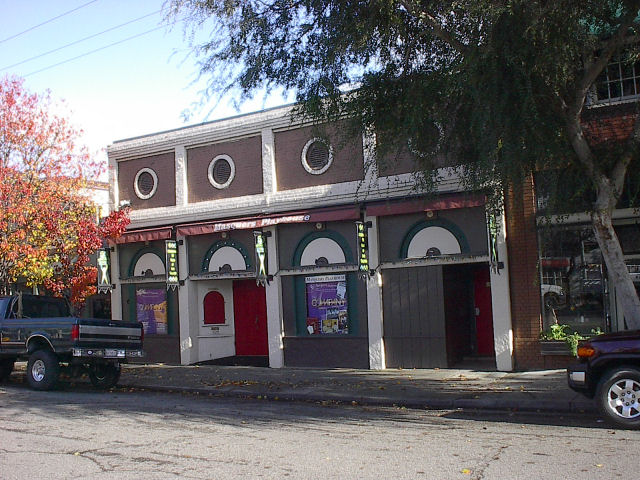
Playhouse Theatre facade in December 2006

The Masquers Playhouse (formerly the Point Richmond Village Playhouse) is an 89-seat community theatre in Point Richmond in Contra Costa County, California.

It is home to the Masquers, a local performing group that has been in production since 1955. Its first play was The Happiest Millionaire in March 1960.

In March 2016 the theatre, then about 110 years old, had to close due to structural problems, but the Masquers continued to stage performances in various nearby venues and held fundraising events to pay for repairs and renovations (seismic retrofitting and wheelchair accessibility).

The East Bay Times reported in June 2020 that repairs were expected to be complete by September (along with a newly remodeled lobby and restrooms).

As of August 2024, according to its website, Masquers was performing three plays and two musicals per year, with performances on Friday and Saturday evenings, and some Sunday matinees. The theatre also hosts children's programs and short-run pieces as part of its Envision program.
