= Cervula =

Roman festival

Cervula or Cervulus was a Roman festival celebrated on the kalends of January (1 January). According to Chambers (1864), remnants seem to have been incorporated into a medieval Christian Feast of the Ass, (Festum Asinorum), which honors the role of donkeys in the Bible, including the Flight into Egypt.
