= James Berkeley (bishop) =

14th-century Bishop of Exeter

- Bishop of Exeter
- Elected: 5 December 1326
- Term ended: 24 June 1327
- Predecessor: Walter de Stapledon
- Successor: John Godeley

Orders
- Consecration: 22 March 1327

Personal details
- Died: 24 June 1327
- Denomination: Catholic
- Coat of arms

James Berkeley (died 1327) was Bishop of Exeter for a period of three months in 1327, a term of office cut short by his death.

== Origins ==
Berkeley was a younger son of Thomas de Berkeley, 1st Baron Berkeley (1245-1321), The Wise, feudal baron of Berkeley of Berkeley Castle in Gloucestershire, by his wife Joan de Ferrers, a daughter of William de Ferrers, 5th Earl of Derby by his wife Margaret de Quincy, a daughter of Roger de Quincy, 2nd Earl of Winchester.

== Career ==
Berkeley was elected bishop on 5 December 1326 and was consecrated on 22 March 1327.

== Death ==
Berkeley died on 24 June 1327, having been murdered and having suffered the destruction and despoliation of his manors, according to the account by his successor John de Grandisson.

== Burial ==
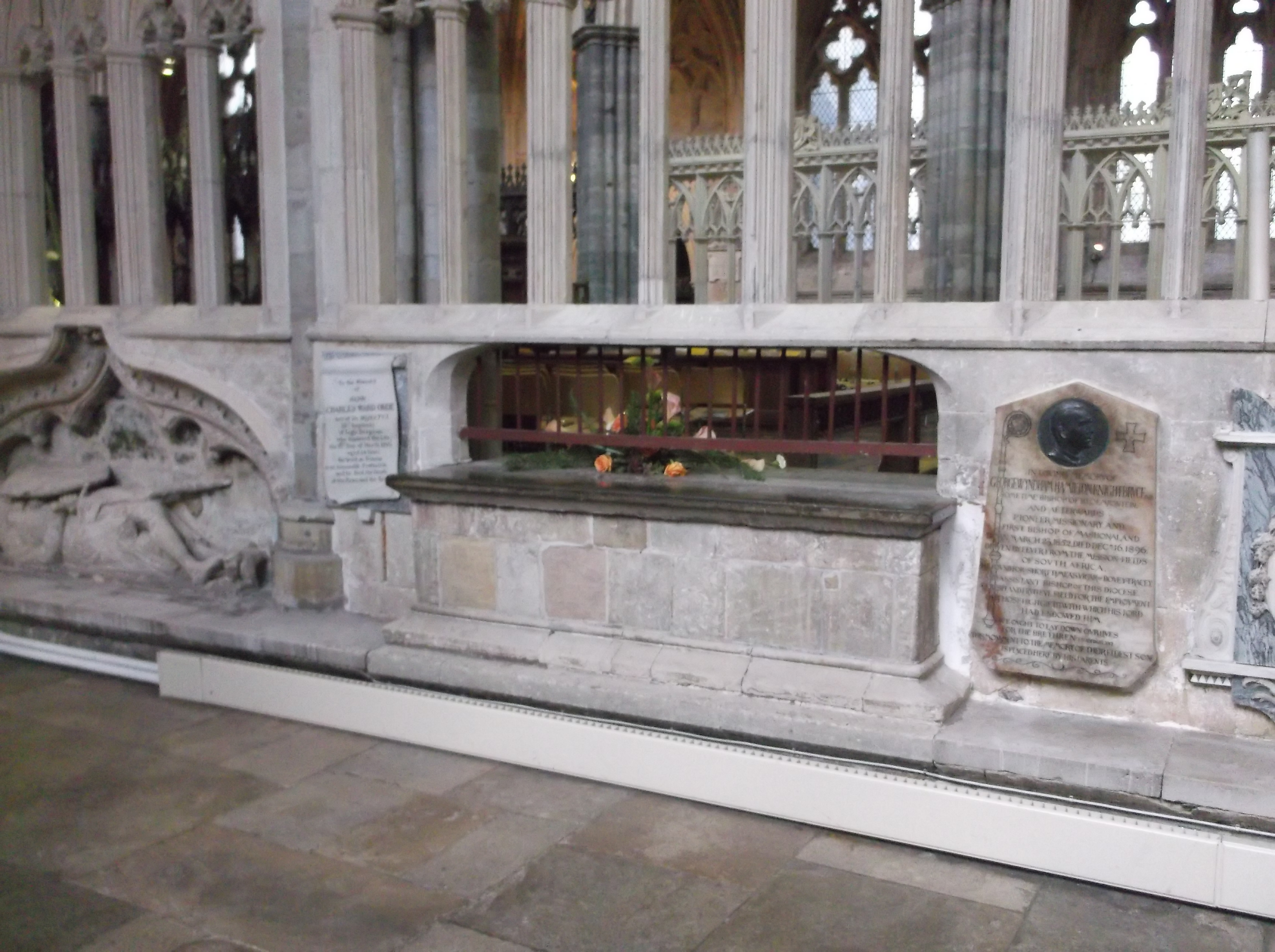
Chest tomb of Bishop James Berkeley (d.1327), north wall of the south ambulatory, Exeter Cathedral

Berkeley was buried in Exeter Cathedral, against the north wall of the south ambulatory, where survives his chest tomb. It is devoid of the monumental brass which originally adorned the Purbeck marble ledger stone top, in the form of a demi-effigy of a bishop wearing a mitre, the indent of which is still visible. Following the Reformation the brass was stripped away in 1561 on the orders of the Cathedral authorities. The antiquarian John Leland (c. 1503-1552) saw the monument complete and recorded in his writings that it bore inscribed Latin verse of which one line was: In Barkley natus, jacet hic Jacobus tumulatus ("In Berkeley (Castle) he was born, here lies James covered"). This is similar to the eight-line leonine verse (or "jingling verse") on the ledger stone of Sir Peter Courtenay (1346–1405), KG, situated a few feet away from the bishop's tomb on the floor of the south ambulatory (but originally part of the Courtenay chantry chapel in the nave) which commences: Devoniae natus, comitis (comes) Petrusque vocatus ("Born of the Earl of Devon, called Peter"). The bishop's monument although now very plain, is of interest as it was constructed whilst the Norman nave was being demolished and rebuilt in the Gothic style, and it was made from some of the stones from the Norman building, alternate squares of pink and cream coloured stone, of which some similar survive in the south aisle of the nave marking the responds of the Norman arcade.

== Citations ==
Catholic Church titles
Preceded by Walter de Stapledon	Bishop of Exeter; 1326–1327	Succeeded by John Godeley
