= Thomas Witney =

Master mason in medieval England

Thomas Witney or Thomas of Witney (fl. 1292–1342) was an English master mason, probably born in Witney, Oxfordshire. The first record of his work is as a mason on the building of St Stephen's Chapel, London in the years following 1292.

He worked on Exeter Cathedral under Bishops Stapledon and Grandisson from about 1313 until his death, and was probably also responsible for the octagonal Lady Chapel in Wells Cathedral.
