= Feast of Fools =

Medieval feast day

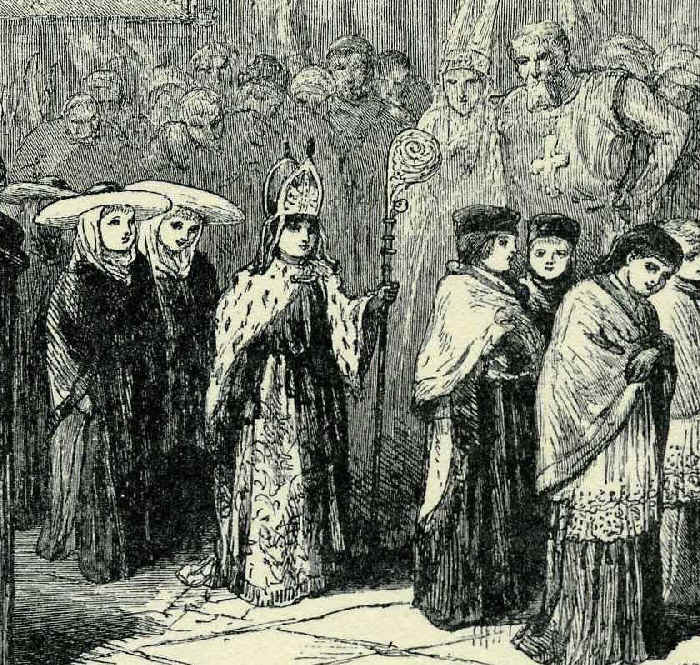
19th-century depiction of a medieval boy bishop, attended by his canons

The Feast of Fools or Festival of Fools (Latin: festum fatuorum, festum stultorum) was a feast day on 1 January celebrated by the clergy in Europe during the Middle Ages, initially in Southern France, but later more widely. During the Feast, participants would elect either a false Bishop, false Archbishop, or false Pope. Ecclesiastical ritual would also be parodied, and higher and lower-level clergy would change places. The lack of surviving documents or accounts, as well as changing cultural and religious norms, has considerably obscured the modern understanding of the Feast, which originated in proper liturgical observance, and has more to do with other examples of medieval liturgical drama, though there is some connection with the earlier pagan (Roman) feasts of Saturnalia and Kalends or the later bourgeois in Sotie. Over the course of a week, the ceremonies would be led by different people in positions of power within the church. On 26 December, St. Stephen's Day, the deacons led the ceremonies. The sub-priests (or vicars) were in charge on 27 December, St. John's Day, the choirboys on 28 December, Holy Innocents’ Day, and the sub-deacons on the first of January, the Feast of the Circumcision. There is some disagreement on whether the term Feast of Fools was originally used to refer to the collection of days or specifically the celebrations taking place on the first of January. The word "fool" is used as a synonym for humble, as was common in the 11th century, rather than the modern use that treats it as another term for clown or jester.

== Origins ==
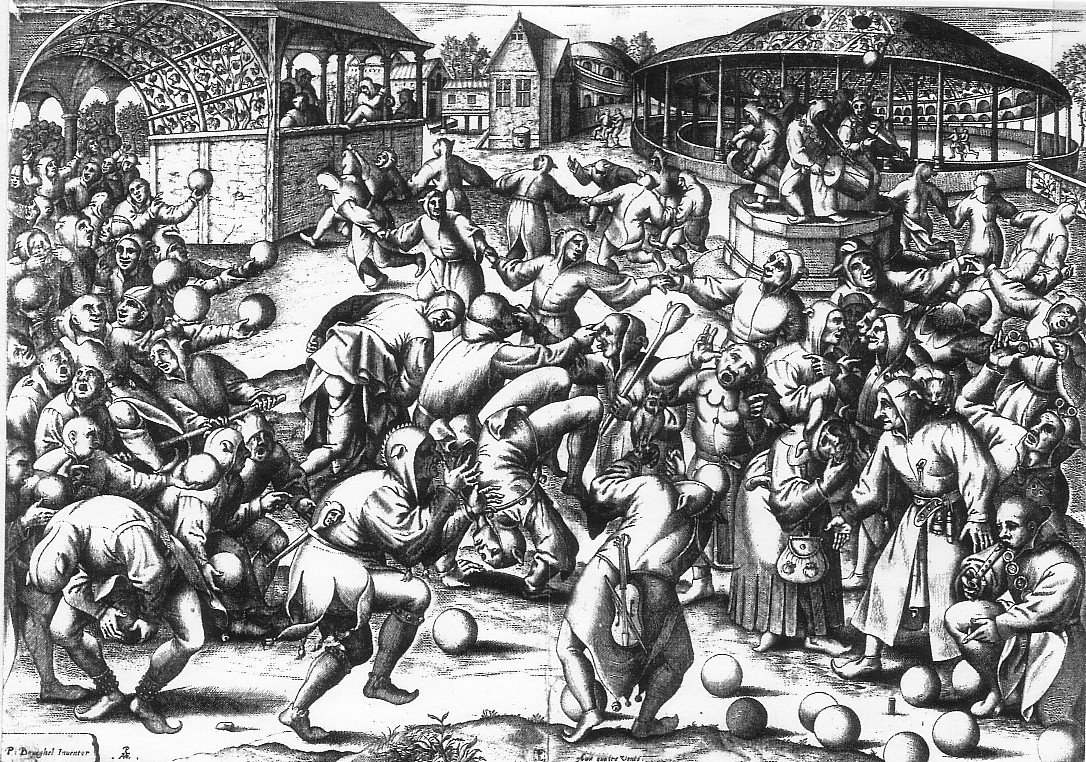
Fools' Convention, 1500, by Pieter Bruegel the Elder

Due to the lack of formal research on the feast, its exact origin is hard to pin down. The most prominent historians place its emergence in Central Europe, somewhere in what is now southeast France, but the margin of error is such that it could have been with France, Italy, or the Holy Roman Empire. Some historians believe a possible start of the feast came between 1119 and 1124, alongside Ordo Rachelis plays as part of the liturgy for Innocents Day (28 December) was Herod games (ludi) as unscripted plays as embellishments of King Herod's involvement that were led by Gerhoh of Reichersberg. These games focused around the alleged absurdity of King Herod, a Jewish-Roman ruler of Judea, and was practiced by storming a cathedral, throwing wooden spears at the choir, and beating by-standers with inflated animal bladders. This is thought to be the start of Feast of Fools since King Herod was coming into vogue in the 11th and 12th centuries, with a notable uptick in the number of plays and pieces being performed about him. Another story that lends strength to the theory of the feast coming from events and plays based on King Herod is his story from the Herod game Office of the Star. The story claims that Herod, who was king of what is now south/central Israel, including Bethlehem, around the nativity of Jesus, learned of Christ's birth and, concerned that a new born king would challenge his own rule of the area, ordered the murder of every new-born boy in his kingdom. The story claims that the murder of Jesus was prevented by King Herod's own page-boys, who then gained God's favor. This is pointed to as the explanation for the reversal of positions with clerical rank during the Feast of Fools, with a God holding page-boys in high regard and not caring for a king. This focus on King Herod is a potential explanation of why the feast did not spread nor survive as long as other festivals, as it was essentially born out of a trend in contemporary medieval theatre. Also this was during the medieval theatre historical backdrop of the fall of the Western Roman Empire and the Catholic Church's discouragement of theatre for being pagan and immoral only to later have their own Christian liturgical dramas like mystery plays such as Ordo Rachelis and passion plays.

The first recorded mention of the feast from the Church comes from between 1160 and 1164 in Paris and was written by John Beleth. He explained how sub-deacons, who it had recently been decided to be the lowest of the highest clerical orders rather than the highest of the lower clerical order, were meant to preside over the Feast of the Circumcision, but that the exact details of the feast had not yet been formalized. It is theorized that this, in combination of the page-boy and King Herod story, is where the tradition of swapping positions within the church came from, showing how God favors the socially low.

== Context and customs ==
The festival seems to have acted as a brief social revolution, in which power, dignity, and impunity was briefly granted to those in a subordinate position. In the views of some historians, this makes the medieval festival a successor to the Roman Kalends of January, although there is no continuity between the two celebrations. Lower-level clergy would also participate in the festival and hold masses on different day which would mock usually church traditions.

On each day of festivities, the participants would elect a single one of them, often referred to as the Archbishop of Fools, and they would carry and wear the items associated with that rank, in addition to gaining the powers normally associated with that position. The meaning of the festival, beyond serving as a chance for joy like any other holiday, was to show that those with power and wealth would eventually fall from grace.

Similar to modern day celebrations like Carnival and Mardi Gras, dancing in a provocative style, wearing masks, and the community being generally more allowing of obscene acts was common place. Additionally, Mardi Gras celebrations include serving of the King Cake or Gallette du Rois, which contains a small token. In earlier times, the person getting the token was crowned as king, and was expected to host the next gathering. Usually celebrated around Epiphany, it is considered a continuation of the ancient Roman Saturnalia where masters would host for their slaves.

== Official condemnation ==
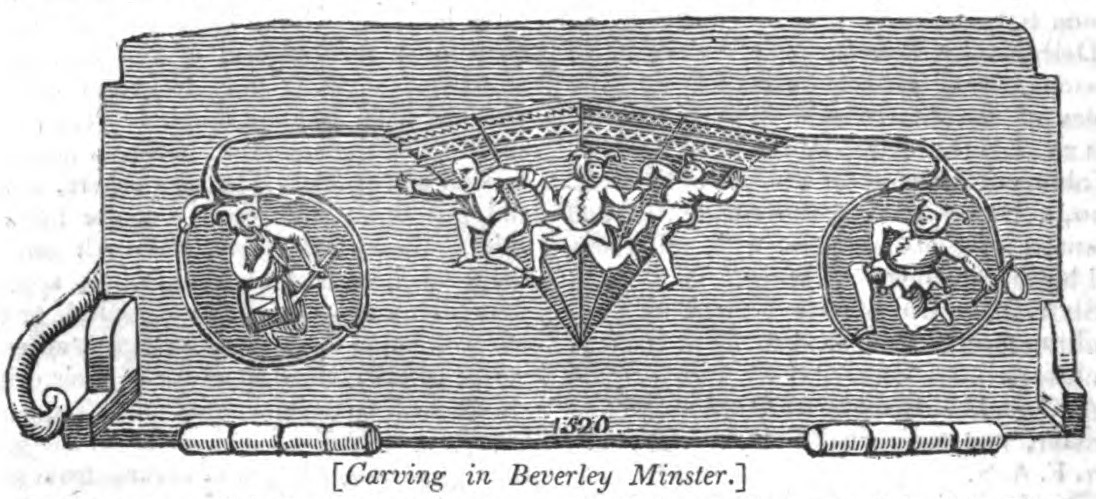
Feast of Fools, Misericord carving in Beverley Minster, East Yorkshire

The Feast of Fools and the subversive traditions associated with it were the object of condemnations of the medieval Church, starting as early as the twelfth century. On the other hand, some Catholic writers have thought it necessary to try to deny the existence of such abuses. One interpretation that reconciles this contradiction is that, while there can be no question that Church authorities of the calibre of Robert Grosseteste repeatedly condemned the license of the Feast of Fools in the strongest terms, such firmly rooted customs took centuries to eradicate. It is certain that the practice lent itself to serious abuses, whose nature and gravity varied at different epochs. It should be said that among the thousands of European liturgical manuscripts the occurrence of anything which has to do with the Feast of Fools is extraordinarily rare. It never occurs in the principal liturgical books, the missals and breviaries. There are traces occasionally in a prose or a trope found in a gradual or an antiphonary. It would therefore seem there was little official approval for such extravagances, which were rarely committed to writing.

In order to curb the extremeness of the festivities after the Feast of Fools, on New Year's Day at Notre-Dame de Paris in the twelfth century, the "Lord of Misrule" or "Precentor Stultorum" was restrained, so that he was to be allowed to intone the prose "Laetemur gaudiis", and to wield the precentor's staff, but this was before the first Vespers of the feast, not during it, though the festival was not entirely banned. During the second Vespers, it had been the custom that the precentor of the fools should be deprived of his staff when the verse in the Magnificat, Deposuit potentes de sede ("He has put down the mighty from their seat") was sung. Hence the feast was often known as the "Festum 'Deposuit'". Eudes de Sully allowed the staff to be taken at that point from the mock precentor but laid down that the verse "Deposuit" not be repeated more than five times. There was a similar case of a legitimized Feast of Fools at Sens about 1220, where the whole text of the office has survived. There are many proses, and interpolations (farsurae) added to the ordinary liturgy, but nothing much unseemly. This prose, or conductus, was not a part of the office, but only a preliminary to Vespers. In 1245 Cardinal Odo, the papal legate in France, wrote to the Chapter of Sens Cathedral demanding that the feast be celebrated with no un-clerical dress and no wreaths of flowers.

== End of the Feast ==
The Feast of Fools was officially forbidden by the Council of Basel in 1431 and again in a document issued by the theological faculty of the University of Paris in 1444; numerous decrees of lower level provincial councils followed. The Feast of Fools was condemned by early Protestants, and among Catholics it seems that the abuse had largely disappeared by the time of the Council of Trent, though instances of festivals of this kind survived in France as late as 1721, in Amiens, France, and Brussels, Belgium in 1719.

== Connections to other holidays ==
- Prior to the creation of the Gregorian Calendar in 1582, most European nations celebrated New Year's Day on 25 March. Since the celebrations of the Feast of Fools generally took place over a week or so, this would cause them to end on 1 April. Those who refused to, or forgot to, change to the new calendar system would be ridiculed as April Fools.
- Due to them all taking place in the post-Christmas season, this festival, the Feast of the Ass, and the Feast of the Circumcision all grew more entangled over the centuries. As a result of fusing with the Feast of the Ass, when the church forbade the festivities from taking place within churches instead of dressing up as high-ranking members of the Church, they instead wore hats to resemble donkey ears.
- Much of the customs in the Feast of Fools have been incorporated into modern-day Carnival, Mardi Gras, and Halloween.

== In popular culture ==
Victor Hugo offers an account of a Feast of Fools in his 1831 novel The Hunchback of Notre-Dame, celebrated on 6 January 1482 (Twelfth Night) when Quasimodo serves as the Pope of Fools. The 1939 film adaptation of the novel opens with the Feast of Fools, where Quasimodo is crowned King of Fools. In Disney's 1996 animated film of the novel, the Feast is shown during the song "Topsy Turvy".

The Feast of Fools and the Church of Rome's efforts to ban it play important roles in Alan Gordon's series of historical novels about the (fictional) Fools' Guild at the turn of the 12th to the 13th centuries. (Not to be confused with the modern Fools Guild.)

== Historiography ==
Possibly as a result of it dying out in the 1700s and possibly as a result of it never spreading as much as other celebrations, there is a lack of research works based specifically upon the Feast of Fools. The first major work was done by Jean Bénigne Lucotte du Tilliot in 1741, titled Memoires pour servir à l’histoire de la fête des foux: Qui se faisoit autrefois dans plusieurs eglises. The first half of the work was effectively a collection of primary sources related to the feast while the second part of the work focused on Infanterie Dijonnaise, a confraternity that he was trying to prove had its beginnings in the feast. The second major work wouldn't come until 1903, written by E. K. Chambers and titled The Mediaeval Stage. Chambers focused heavily on the feast's potential pagan origins, almost writing off its liturgical origins. The last major work was Max Harris's Sacred Folly: A New History of the Feast of Fools, published in 2011 and now considered a standard source. Harris's work argues against nearly everything Chambers stated, arguing instead that the feast has pagan, Christian, and secular roots.

== See also ==
- Play of Daniel
- Goliards
- Liturgical drama
- Substitute king ritual

== Bibliography ==
- Arlt, David Wulf (1970). Ein Festoffizium des Mittelalters aus Beauvais in seiner liturgischen und musikalischen Bedeutung. Cologne: Arno Volk Verlag. "2 Vols."
- Arlt, David Wulf (2000). Fassler, Margot E.; Baltzer, Rebecca A. (eds.). The Office for the Feast of the Circumcision from Le Puy. The Divine Office in the Latin Middle Ages. Translated by Lori Kruckenberg; Kelly Landerkin; Margot E. Fassler. New York: Oxford University Press. pp. 324–343.
- Hughes, David G. (1985). Shapiro, Anne Dhu; Benjamin, Phyllis (eds.). Another Source for the Beauvais Feast of Fools. Music and Context: Essays for John M. Ward. Cambridge: Cambridge University Press. pp. 14–31.
- Sandon, Nick, ed. (1984). The Octave of the Nativity: Essays and Notes on Ten Liturgical Reconstructions for Christmas. London: British Broadcasting Corporation.
