= Feast of the Ass =

Medieval Christian feast

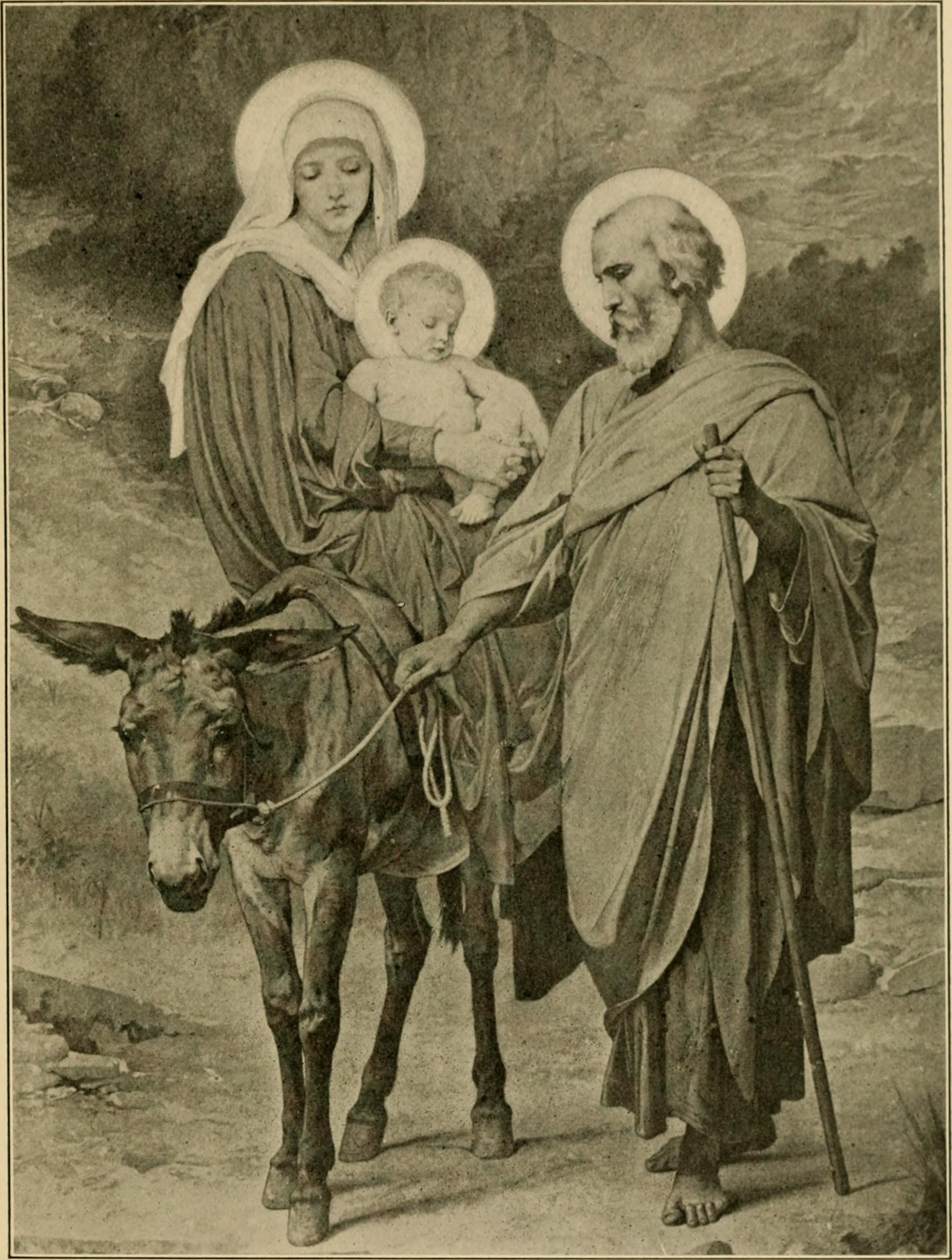
- Flight into Egypt
- Type: Cultural, Western
- Significance: Celebrates the Flight into Egypt
- Date: 14 January
- Next time: 14 January 2027
- Frequency: Annual

The Feast of the Ass (Latin: Festum Asinorum, asinaria festa; French: Fête de l'âne) is a medieval Christian feast observed on 14 January, celebrating the flight into Egypt. It was originally celebrated primarily in France, as a by-product of the Feast of Fools celebrating the donkey-related stories in the Bible, in particular the donkey bearing the Holy Family into Egypt after Jesus' birth.

== History ==
This feast may represent a Christian adaptation of the pagan feast Cervulus, integrating it with the donkey in the nativity story. In connection with the biblical stories, the celebration was first observed in the 11th century, inspired by the pseudo-Augustinian Sermo contra Judaeos c. 6th century.

In the second half of the 15th century, the feast disappeared gradually, along with the Feast of Fools, which was stamped out around the same time. It was not considered as objectionable as the Feast of Fools.

In December of 2024, Dan Savage launched his effort to revive the celebration

== Practices ==
A girl and a child on a donkey would be led through town to the church, where the donkey would stand beside the altar during the sermon.

== Details ==
The preacher impersonates the Hebrew prophets whose messianic utterances he works into an argument establishing the divinity of Christ. After confuting the Jews out of the mouths of their teachers, the orator addresses the unbelieving Gentiles: "Ecce, convertimur ad gentes." The testimony of Virgil, Nabuchodonosor, and the Erythraean Sibyl is interpreted in favor of the general thesis. As early as the eleventh century, this sermon had the form of a metrical dramatic dialogue, the stage-arrangement adhering to the original while modified by additions and adaptations.

A Rouen manuscript of the 13th century exhibits twenty-eight prophets taking part in the play. After Terce, the rubric directs "let the procession move to the church, in the center of which, let there be a furnace and an idol for the brethren to refuse to worship." The procession filed into the choir. On one side were seated Moses, Amos, Isaias, Aaron, Balaam and his Ass, Zachary and Elizabeth, John the Baptist, and Simeon. The opposing team of three Gentile prophets sat opposite. The proceedings were conducted under the auspices of Saint Augustine; the presiding dignitary called on each of the prophets, and each testified to the birth of the Messiah.

After the Sibyl recited her acrostic lines on the Judgement Signs, the prophets sang praise to the long-sought Savior. Mass immediately followed. In all this, the pleasant part to the congregation is the role of Balaam and the Ass; hence, the popular designation of the Processus Prophetarum as the Feast of the Ass. The part of Balaam was dissociated, then expanded into an independent drama. The Rouen rubrics direct two messengers sent by King Balaak to bring forth the prophet. Balaam advances riding on a caparisoned ass (a hobby ass, because the rubric hides somebody beneath the trappings, an unenviable position because of the direction to the rider "and let him goad the ass with his spurs").

According to the Chester pageant, the prophet rode on a wooden animal, because the rubric supposes the speaker for the beast is "in asina". During the next the scene, the ass meets the angel to protest the rider. Post-detachment from the foundation, the Festum Asinorum branched in various directions. In the Beauvais 13th-century document, the Feast of Asses is an independent trope with a different date and intent.

At Beauvais, the Ass continued his role of enlivening the long procession of Prophets. On the January 14, however, he discharged an important function in that city's festivities. On the feast of the Flight into Egypt, a fertile female carrying a child was on a draped ass, and conducted with great and holy gravity to St Stephen's Church. The Ass was stationed at the altar, and the Mass began. After the Introit, a Latin prose was sung.

The first stanza and its French refrain may serve as a specimen of these nine:

Orientis partibus
Adventavit Asinus
Pulcher et fortissimus
Sarcinis aptissimus.

Hez, Sire Asnes, car chantez,
Belle bouche rechignez,
Vous aurez du foin assez
Et de l'avoine a plantez.

(From the Eastern lands, the Ass comes, beautiful and brave, fit to bear burdens. Up! Sir Ass, and sing. Open your pretty mouth. Hay will be yours in plenty, and oats in abundance.)

Post-mass, apparently without awakening the least consciousness of its impropriety, this (in Latin) was observed:

In fine Missae sacerdos, versus ad populum, vice 'Ite, Missa est', ter hinhannabit: populus vero, vice 'Deo Gratias', ter respondebit, 'Hinham, hinham, hinham.'

(At the end of Mass, the priest turned to the spectators. In lieu of saying the 'Ite missa est', will bray thrice; the people instead of replying 'Deo Gratias', say 'Hinham, hinham, hinham.')

This is the solitary example of a service of this nature in connection with the Feast of Ass. The Festum Asinorum was modified into the ceremonies of the Deposuit... or united with the general merry-making on the Feast of Fools. The Processus Prophetarum survives in the Corpus Christi and Whitsun Cycles at the head of the modern English drama.

== See also ==
- Boy bishop
- Christmas
- Donkey walk
- Feast of Fools
- Liturgical drama
- Nativity of Jesus
