= Boy bishop =

Medieval Christian tradition

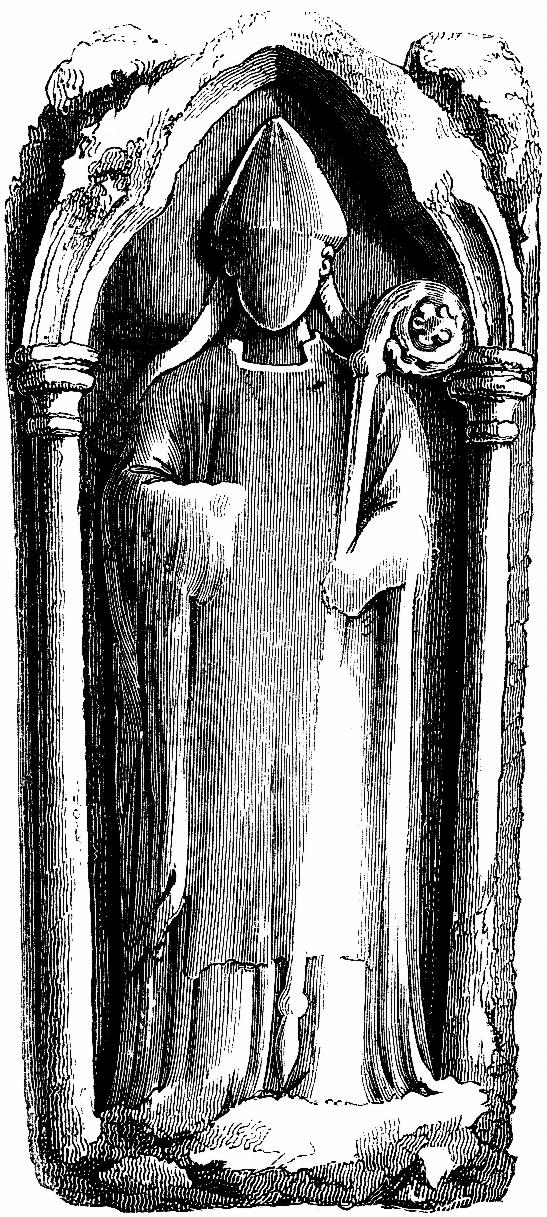
Reputed tomb of a Boy bishop in Salisbury Cathedral in Wiltshire, England

Boy bishop or Chorister Bishop is the title of a tradition in the Middle Ages, whereby a boy was chosen, for example, among cathedral choristers, to parody the adult bishop, commonly on the feast of Holy Innocents on 28 December. This tradition links with others, such as the Feast of Fools and the Feast of Asses.

== History ==
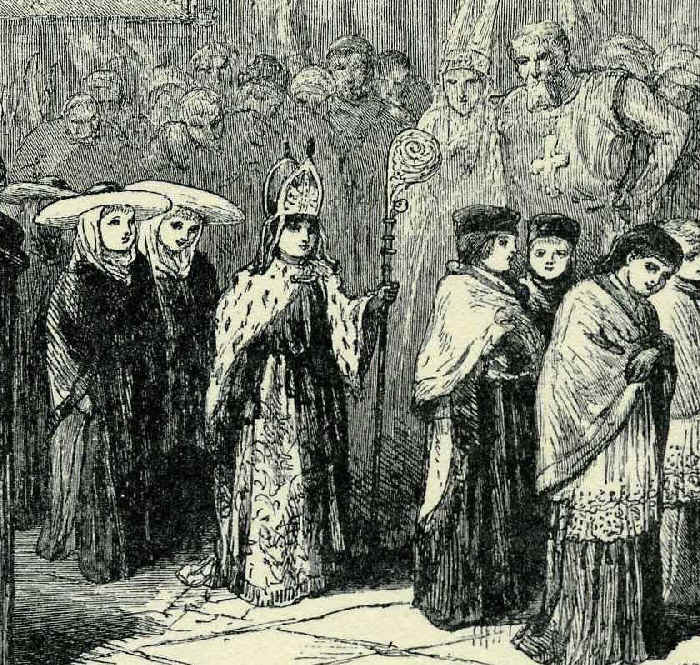
19th-century depiction of a medieval boy bishop, attended by his canons

In England, the boy bishop was elected on the first Sunday of December, the feast of Saint Nicholas, the patron saint of children, and his authority lasted through Holy Innocents' day (28 December). The adult bishop, symbolically, steps down at the deposuit potentes de sede of the Magnificat ('he hath put down the mighty from their seat'), and the boy takes his seat at et exaltavit humiles ('and hath exalted the humble and meek').

After the election, the boy dressed in full bishop's robes with mitre and crozier, and, attended by other boys dressed as priests, made a circuit of the town blessing the people. Typically, the boy bishop and his minions took possession of the cathedral and performed all the ceremonies and offices except Mass. This custom spread to many parishes.

Notwithstanding the intervention of various Church authorities (see Feast of Fools), the popularity of the custom made it resilient. In England, it was abolished by Henry VIII in 1542, revived by Mary I in 1553, and, finally, abolished by Elizabeth I. This tradition continued among Germans, in the so-called Gregoriusfest probably founded by Pope Gregory IV. This tradition continues in Spain. The tradition includes many time-honored legends, such as recognizing a mini-effigy in Salisbury Cathedral as a boy bishop; however, this is likely a tertiary burial of removed organs (sexual organs or viscera) of an adult bishop. There are rumors that they may belong to Richard Poore.

== Revivals ==
The English-speaking world enjoys many versions, including Hereford, revived in 1973 for a special children's service, with both full and traditional ceremonies following annually since 1982. The Boy Bishop preaches a sermon and leads prayers at Diocesan Advent services. Another revival in 1959 was at St George's Parish Church, Stockport. These ceremonies are also at Westminster Cathedral, Salisbury Cathedral, and churches throughout England, including All Saints' Church, Northampton, St John the Baptist, Claines, Worcestershire, where the 50th Junior Bishop was installed on Sunday, 8 December 2024, and St Christopher's Parish Church, Bournemouth, (early 1950s until mid-1980s). The Boy Bishop was installed there on St Christopher's Day (25 July) and 'reigned' for one year, preaching and 'presiding' at youth events. The market town of Alcester, Warwickshire, has St Nicholas night complete with the Boy Bishop on 6 December each year.

The tradition continues in Burgos, Spain. There, the boy-bishop feast is extremely popular before the cathedral choir. After its re-establishment, the boy bishop was revived in 1987 and is celebrated annually. Palencia also holds the ceremony. The tradition in the Monastery of Montserrat by L'Escolania is renowned. The festival was also revived in Chavagnes International College, a Catholic boarding school in France.

In the United States, adoptions of the custom took place in 1979 at the Cathedral of All Saints (Episcopal) in Albany, New York, as part of an annual renaissance fair on the grounds of the Gothic church.

In December 2009, a teenage girl from Wellingborough, England, was appointed Britain's First Girl Bishop at All Saints' Church. Furthermore, it is more widely known as the Chorister Bishop ceremony, rather than the Boy Bishop Ceremony.
