= Purim rabbi =

Mock rabbi during Purim

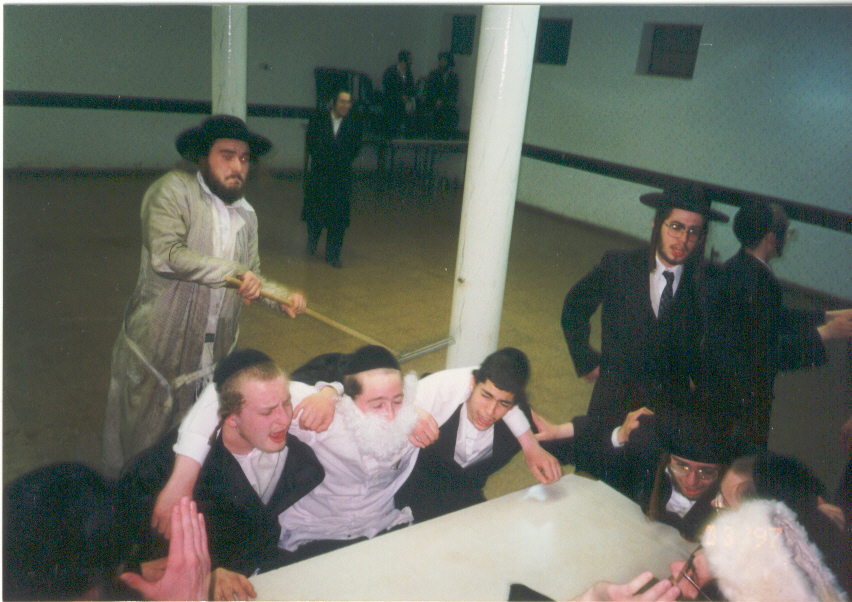
Students of Kohav Miya'akov Yeshiva, Jerusalem, celebrating Purim

A Purim Rabbi of Purim Rav (Hebrew: רב פורים; Rav Purim) is a mock rabbi appointed during the celebration of Purim to recite the Purim Torah and to perform other mock sermons. The Purim Rabbi is not necessarily a real rabbi. The tradition of Purim Rabbi is a widespread parody in Ashkenazi yeshivot, ulpanot and other schools with religious education.

== History ==
The tradition of Purim Rabbi has been common for many centuries in yeshivot of Spain, Italy, France, and Germany, from where it was transferred to Poland as well. The modern tradition of Purim Rabbi in yeshivot is attributed to Volozhin Yeshiva; it is said that the Rosh yeshiva appointed one every year, and Purim Rabbi would satirize the yeshiva life and administration. It is said that Rav Kook was selected to serve as "Purim gabbai" of Volozhin Yeshiva and he recited humorous verses poking fun at yeshiva events and administration. He did so in Hebrew and Aramaic. One of his famous quips is "Berlin will sink and Berlin will rise". According to the Volozhin tradition, the custom of Purim Rabbi was introduced by Rabbi Chaim of Volozhin, the founder of the yeshiva, with the purpose that when he resigned from the Rosh yeshiva office on Purim, then the Purim Rabbi would have a possibility to criticize him (and other officials) in the case he had done something inappropriate during the year.

Some rabbis, such as Sephardi Chief Rabbi of Israel Ovadia Yosef and Ashkenazi Chief Rabbi Yona Metzger, criticize the tradition of Purim Rabbi. There is an opposition to importing the Ashkenazi tradition of Purim Rav into Sephardi yeshivot. At the same time the tradition in Ashkenazi yeshivot may be defended, if it is performed reasonably, without crossing the line between good-spirited jokes and denigrating the Rav. Rabbi Yona Metzger noted that often Purim Rabbis cross the border of good-hearted humor into slander and gossip, which should not be tolerated.

Jeffrey L. Rubenstein points out that Purim rabbi is a case of the Purim tradition of "VeNahafoch hu" ("The opposite happened" - words from the Megillah), i.e., various kinds of reversal, along with dressing men as women. He notes that in the past it was not uncommon to seize the roles rosh yeshiva, rosh qahal, hazzan, etc. during Purim.

== See also ==
- Purim humor
- Lord of Misrule, European court figure appointed to preside over the Feast of Fools, a similar Christian tradition
