= King of Fools =

King of Fools may refer to:

- Quasimodo, given the honorific "King of Fools" in Disney's 1996 film The Hunchback of Notre Dame
- King of Fools (album), an album by Delirious?
- King of Fools (EP), an EP by Edguy
- "King of Fools", a song by Dwight Yoakam from This Time
- "King of Fools", a song by Social Distortion from Somewhere Between Heaven and Hell
- "King of Fools", a song by IQ from their 1997 album Subterranea
- "King of Fools", a song by Brainstorm from their 1997 album Hungry
- "King of Fools", a song by Gene Vincent
- "King of Fools", a song by Poets of the Fall from their 2006 album Carnival of Rust

== See also ==
- Lord of Misrule, a European court figure appointed to preside over the Feast of Fools
- Lords of Misrule (disambiguation)
