= Lord of Misrule (disambiguation) =

The Lord of Misrule was an officer to preside over the medieval Feast of Fools.

Lord of Misrule may also refer to:

- Lord of Misrule (novel), a 2010 novel by Jaimy Gordon
- Lord of Misrule: The Autobiography of Christopher Lee, 2003
- Lord of Misrule, a 2009 novel by Rachel Caine (book 5 of The Morganville Vampires series)
- Lord of Misrule, a 2017 album by Canadian rock band Blood Ceremony
- Lord of Misrule (film), a 2024 folk horror film directed by William Brent Bell

== See also ==
- Lords of Misrule (disambiguation)
