= Gerald Blidstein =

Israeli Jewish law scholar (1938–2020)

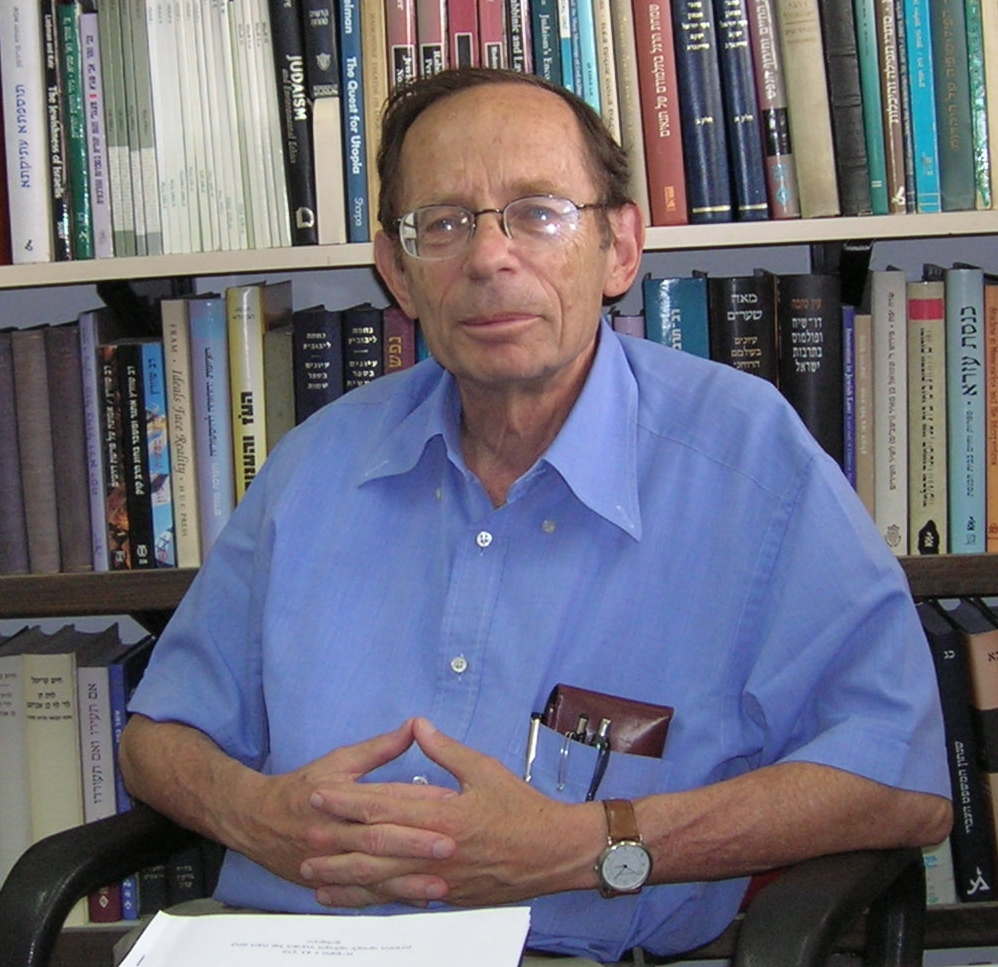
- Professor Yaakov Blidstein
- Born: Gerald Blidstein; June 11, 1938; New York, NY, U.S.
- Died: September 10, 2020 (aged 82); Israel
- Education: Yeshiva College, Columbia University (MA); Yeshiva University (PhD)
- Occupations: Professor of Jewish Philosophy, Dean of the Faculty of Humanities at Ben Gurion University
- Known for: Studies on talmudic and medieval Jewish thought, especially in the works of Maimonides; many articles on contemporary Jewish thought.

Gerald Blidstein (Hebrew: ג'ראלד בלידשטין; June 11, 1938 – September 10, 2020) was professor emeritus of Jewish philosophy at Israel's Ben-Gurion University of the Negev. He was the Israel Prize laureate in Jewish philosophy (2006) and had been a member of the Israel Academy of Sciences since 2007.

== Biography ==
Gerald Yaakov Blidstein was born in New York and received his B.A. from Yeshiva University; his M.A. in 1961 from Columbia University, in English and comparative literature (honors); and his PhD in 1968 from Yeshiva University in Rabbinics. Even many decades after he left Yeshiva College, one of his teachers, Professor Louis Feldman, continued to express pride that Blidstein was one of his students. He received rabbinic ordination from Rabbi Isaac Elchanan Theological Seminary where he studied under Rabbi Joseph B. Soloveitchik. His Ph.D. advisor at Yeshiva University was the scholar of the Talmud Abraham Weiss.

== Academic career ==
Before immigrating to Israel in 1972, he was a lecturer in Jewish studies at Stern College for Women, assistant professor in the Department of Religion at Temple University, and then associate professor at McGill University. He was appointed associate professor at Ben Gurion University of the Negev in 1976 and became full professor at Ben Gurion in 1985. He served as head of the Jewish Philosophy Department at Ben Gurion and also as chair of Goldstein-Goren Department of Jewish Thought at Ben Gurion. He was a senior lecturer in the Department of Talmud and Jewish Philosophy at Tel Aviv University. He spent sabbaticals as the Pew Visiting Professor in Judaic Humanities at Gratz College in Philadelphia, and as the senior fellow, Department of Oriental Studies, at University of Pennsylvania. He was appointed as a fellow at the Israel Institute for Advanced Studies at Hebrew University, and at the Israel Academy of Sciences and Humanities.

Bildstein was awarded the Israel Prize for his seminal work on Jewish political thought and especially for his important studies on the philosophy of Maimonides. The Ministry of Education stated that Blidstein "has made ... a radical breakthrough in research into the halachic philosophy of Maimonides and its influence throughout the generations. In his very accurate analysis of the Halakha, he reveals its philosophical foundations and deepens our understanding of pure philosophy." He wrote books on four topics of the Mishneh Torah of Maimonides: Kings, Prayer, Heretics, and the Laws of Torah Study. His first major work on Maimonides was Political Concepts in Maimonidean Hakakha, first published in 1983, revised and republished in 2003.

In this and other works, Blidstein analyzed the sources of political authority in halakhic literature, and discussed the impact of contemporary culture on Maimonides' rulings. He was the first faculty member of Ben Gurion University to receive the prestigious Israel Prize and was also the first to be appointed to the Israel Academy of Sciences. As a dedicated Zionist, Blidstein wrote, "The Jew who loves his people wishes to experience its fullness, and the adventure, the challenge, of Jewish fullness today is in Israel. The Jew who identifies with his people wishes to be at the cutting edge of its history and that, today, is in Israel."

== Awards and recognition ==
- David Yellin Jerusalem Prize for education and Jewish Studies, 1985.
- Honorary Doctorate from Yeshiva University, 1997
- Israel Prize in Jewish Thought, 2006
- Fellow of the National Academy of Israeli Academy of Sciences and Humanities, 2007

== Published works ==
=== Papers and monographs ===
- "The Dayan's Truth as Decision Tool According to Maimonides," Dine Israel no.24 (2007): 119-160 (Hebrew).
- “Public Respect (Kevod ha-Briyot) and Human Dignity,” in Joseph E. David, ed., Questioning Dignity: On Human Dignity as Supreme Moral Value in the Modern Society (Jerusalem: The Israel Democracy Institute, 2006), 97-138 (Hebrew)
- “Spreading the Faith as a Goal of War in the Doctrine of Maimonides,” in Avriel Bar-Levav, ed., War and Peace in the Hebrew Culture (Jerusalem: Shazar, 2006), 85-97 (Hebrew)
- “Parashat Shemini,” in Hadas Ahituv and Ariel Picar, eds., Likrat Shabbat (Ein Tsurim: Herzog, 2006), 173-176 (Hebrew)
- “On Lay Legislation in Halakhah: The King as Instance,” in Suzanne Last Stone, ed., Rabbinic and Lay Communal Authority (New York: Yeshiva University Press, 2006), 1-17
- “Honoring Parents in Halakhah and Aggadah,” in Yehudah Shaviv, ed., ‘Devarim she-Yesh la-Hem Shiur’: Yehonatan Deviri Memorial Volume (Alon Shvut: Tsomet, 2005), 27-53 (Hebrew)
- “Rabbi J.B. Soloveitchik a Religious-Zionist Thinker, Indeed?” Jerusalem Studies in Jewish Thought, no. 19 (2005): 439-450 (Hebrew)
- “Midrashim on Aharon and Miriam,” in Zeev Gries, et al., eds., Shefa Tal: Studies in Jewish Thought and Hebrew Culture Presented to Brakha Sack (Beer-Sheva: BGU, 2004), 1-12 (Hebrew)
- “The ‘Other’ in Maimonidean Law,” Jewish History, vol. 18, no. 2-3 (2004): 173-195
- “Review of ‘Divine Contradictions: Judaism and the Language of Paradox’, by Harold Fisch,” BaDaD, no. 14 (March 2004): 131-133 (Hebrew)
- “Halakha: The Jewish Normative World,” in Amihai Berholtz, ed., Journey to the Halakhah (Tel-Aviv: Yediot Aharonot, 2003), 21-58 (Hebrew)
- “The Halakhic Concept of a Miracle (Nes),” Daat, no. 50-52 (2003): 1-12 (Hebrew)
- “Review of J.B. Soloveitchik, Man and his Home, Six Essays on Family Life,” Akdamot, no. 13 (2003): 255-261 (Hebrew)
- “The State and the Legitimate Use of Force and Coercion in Modern Halakhic Thought,” Studies in Contemporary Jewry, vol. 18 (2002): 3-22
- “Master and Parent: Comparative Aspects of a Dual Loyalty,(Mishnah Baba Meziah 2:11 and Mark 3:31-35)” in Alan J. Avery-Peck and Jacob Neusner, eds., The Mishnah in Contemporary Perspective (Part One) (Leiden: Brill, 2002), 255-266
- “Review of Eliyahu Capsali, ‘Meah Shearim’, ed. Avraham Shoshana,” Jewish Action, vol. 63, no. 2 (Winter 2002): 63-65
- “Did the Rabbis Cause the Hellenizers to be Forgotten,” in Avi Sagi and Nahem Ilan, eds., Jewish Culture in the Eye of the Storm: A Jubilee Vol. in Honor of Joseph Ahituv (Ein Zurim: Hakibbutz Hameuchad Press and Ne'emanei Torah Va'Avodah, 2002), 321-326 (Hebrew)
- “The Political Thought of Rabbi Shaul Israeli,” in Mordechai Bar-On and Zvi Zameret, eds., On the Two Sides of the Bridge: State and Religion in Israel First Years (Jerusalem: Ben-Zvi Inst., 2002), 350-363 (Hebrew)
- “‘Kiddush Hashem’ and ‘Hillul Hashem’,” Akdamot, no. 11 (2001): 123-128 (Hebrew)
- “Art and the Jew: Review of ‘The Artless Jew: Medieval and Modern Affirmations and Denials of the Visual’, by Kalman Bland,” Torah UMadda Journal, no. 10 (2001): 163-172
- “About the Concept of Positive Commandments Depending on Time in Maimonides’ Thought,” Sinai, no. 128 (2001): 66-71 (Hebrew)
- “Hanukka in Hazal: The Missing Players,” Tradition, vol. 35, no. 3 (Fall 2001): 20-23
- “Be Meticulous in the Prayer – Indeed?” in Joseph Tabory, ed., Kenishta: Studies on Synagogue and it World, vol. 1 (Ramat Gan: Bar-Ilan University Press, 2001), 9-11 (Hebrew)
- “Contemporary Halakhic Decision-Making: An Examination of Maimonides’ Hilkhot Mamrim 1:5,” Dine Israel, no. 20-21 (2000-2001): 3-12 (Hebrew)
- “Residence in the Land of Israel in Maimonidean Law: A Study of the Laws of Kings 5:9-12,” in Ezra Fleischer, et al., eds., Me’ah She’arim: Studies in Medieval Jewish Spiritual Life in Memory of Isadore Twersky (Jerusalem, Magnes, 2001), 171-190 (Hebrew)
- “Yovel: Ideology and History in Rabbinic Law,” in Enrico Rambaldi, ed., Millenarismi nella cultura contemporanea (Milan: Angeli, 2000), 187-198
- “Notes on Some Ideological Aspects of Rabbeinu Hananel’s Commentaries to the Talmud,” Sidra, no. 15 (1999): 5-11 (Hebrew)
- “Review of ‘The History of Sukkot in the Second Temple and Rabbinic Period’, by Jeffrey L. Rubenstein,” JQR, vol. 89, no. 3-4 (Jan.-April 1999): 400-402
- “Halakha and Democracy,” Tarbut Demokratit, no. 2 (1999): 1-41 (Hebrew)
- “Institutionalization of Prophecy in Maimonidean Halakha,” Da’at, no. 43 (Summer 1999): 25-42 (Hebrew)
- “The Congregation and Public Prayer in the Writings of R. Abraham the son of Maimonides,” Pe’amim, no. 78 (Winter 1999): 148-163 (Hebrew)
- “Traditional Discourse and Modern Discourse: More on Autonomy and Authority,” in N. Ilan, et al., eds., 'A Good Eye': Dialogue and Polemic in Jewish Culture: A Jubilee Vol. in Honor of Tova Ilan (Tel Aviv: Hakibbutz Hameuchad and Ne'emanei Torah Va'Avodah, 1999), 687-697 (Hebrew)
- “Sheliah Zibbur: Function and History,” in Joseph Tabory, ed., From Qumran to Cairo: Studies in the History of Prayer (Jerusalem, 1999) 39-73 (Hebrew)
- “Non-Judicial Appointment of the King: Some Non-Maimonidean Views,” Sinai, no. 121 (1998): 165-168 (Hebrew)
- "‘Even if They Tell You the Right is Left‘: The Validity of Moral Authority in the Halakha and its Limitations" (Abbreviated from Avi Sagi and Zeev Safrai, ed., Between Authority and Autonomy in Jewish Tradition (Tel-Aviv: Hakibbutz Hameuchad and Ne'emanei Torah Va'Avodah, 1997), 158-180 (Hebrew).
- “On the Halakhic Thought of Rabbi J. B. Soloveitchik: The Norms and Nature of Mourning,” in Menachem D. Genack, ed., Rabbi J.B. Soloveitchik: Man of Halacha, Man of Halacha (Hoboken: Ktav, 1998), 139-159
- “Review of ‘How Do We Know This? Midrash and the Fragmentation of Modern Judaism’, by Jay M. Harris,” Kiryat Sefer, no. 68 (1998): 205-220 (Hebrew)
- “Review of ‘Commandment and Community: New Essays in Jewish Legal and Political Philosophy’, ed. Daniel H. Frank,” Studies in Contemporary Jewry, vol. 14 (1998): 326-328
- “Maimonides on the Renewal of Semikha: Some Historical Perspective,” Jewish Political Studies Review, vol. 10, no. 3-4 (Fall 1998): 23-46
- “Ethics and Exegesis: The Biblical ‘Stranger’ of Ibn Ezra,” in Arnold Enker and Sinai Deutch, ed., Studies in Jewish Law: Papers Presented at the Lublin Conference in Jewish Law (Ramat-Gan: Bar-Ilan University Press, 1998), 155-167 (Hebrew)
- “Mishnah Avot 1:1 and the Nature of Rabbinic Authority,” in Haim Marantz, ed., Judaism and Education: Essays in Honor of Walter I. Ackerman (Beer Sheva: BGU, 1998), 55-72
- “The Torah of Eretz Yisrael in the Works of the Netziv of Volozhin,” in Aviezer Ravitzky, ed., The Land of Israel in Modern Jewish Thought (Jerusalem, Ben Zvi Inst., 1998), 466-480 (Hebrew)
- “The Status of Islam in Maimonidean Halakha,” in Menachem Mautner, et al., eds., Multiculturalism in a Democratic and Jewish State: The Ariel Rosen-Zvi Memorial Book (Ramot: Tel-Aviv University, 1998), 465-476 (Hebrew)
- “The Character of the Patriarchy in the Halakhic Writings of Maimonides,” Shenaton ha-Mishpat ha-Ivri, no. 20 (1995-1997): 25-48 (Hebrew)
- “Halakha and Democracy,” Tradition, vol. 32, no. 1 (Fall 1997): 6-39
- “Tikkun Olam,” in David Shatz, et al., eds., Tikkun Olam: Social Responsibility in Jewish Thought and Law (Northvale, NJ: Jason Aronson, Inc., 1997), 17-59
- “Review of The Authorized Version of the Code of Maimonides: The Book of Knowledge and the Book of Love, ed. Shlomo Zalman Havlin,” Jewish Action, vol. 58, no. 2 (Winter 1997): 86-88
- “'Even if They Tell You Right is Left’: The Validity of Moral Authority in the Halakha and its Limitations,” in Avi Sagi and Zeev Safrai, ed., Between Authority and Autonomy in Jewish Tradition (Tel-Aviv: Hakibbutz Hameuchad and Ne'emanei Torah Va'Avodah, 1997), 158-180 (Hebrew)
- “The Massacre at Shechem, Collective Punishment, and Contemporary Halakhic Thought,” Et Ha-Da’at, vol. 1 (1997): 48-55 (Hebrew)
- “The Ethical and Legal Status of Hostile Civilian Populations in Contemporary Halakhic Thought,” in State, Government, and International Relations, vols. 41-42 (1997): 155-170 (Hebrew)
- "Rabbinic Judaism and General Culture: Normative Discussion and Attitudes in Judaism's Encounter with Other Cultures: Rejection or Integration, ed. J.J. Schacter (N.J.:Aronson, 1997).
- “The Guttman Report – The End of Commitment?” in Charles S. Liebman and Elihu Katz, eds., The Jewishness of Israelis: Responses to the Guttman Report (Albany, SUNY Press, 1997), 125-129
- “On the Jewish People in the Writings of Rabbi J.B. Soloveitchik,” in Marc D. Angel, ed., Exploring the Thought of Rabbi J.B. Soloveitchik (Hoboken: Ktav Publishing House, 1997), 293-322
- “Parent and Teacher: Halakhic and Comparative Aspects of a Dual Loyalty,” in Mordechai Akiva Friedman, ed., Marriage and the Family in Halakhah and Jewish Thought [=Teudah, vol. 13] (Tel-Aviv: TAU, 1997), 19-34 (Hebrew)
- “On the ‘Fondness of Midrash’: A Note on Maimonidean Technique,” Sinai, no. 118 (1996): 171-175 (Hebrew)
- “On The Halakhic Thought of Rabbi J.B. Soloveitchik: The Norms and Nature of Mourning,” Tradition, vol. 30, no. 4 (Summer 1996): 115-13
- “The Treatment of Hostile Civilian Populations: The Contemporary Halakhic Discussion in Israel,” Israel Studies, vol. 1, no. 2 (Fall 1996): 27-45
- “A Note on Rabbinic Missionizing,” Journal of Theological Studies, vol. 47, no. 2 (Oct. 1996): 528-531
- “Halakhah - The Governing Norm,” Jewish Political Studies Review, vol. 8, no. 1-2 (1996): 37-80
- “Subjectivity in Tannaitic Halakhic Definition,” Torah Umadda Journal, no. 6 (1995-1996): 1-14
- “Parents and Children in Maimonides' Philosophy and Halakha,” Da’at, no. 37 (Summer 1996): 27-36 (Hebrew)
- “Maimonides’ Taqqanah Concerning Public Prayer,” Maimonidean Studies, vol. 3 (1995): 3-28
- “Review of ‘Rabbinic Authority and Personal Autonomy’, ed. Moshe Z. Sokol,” Studies in Contemporary Jewry, vol. 11 (1995): 328-330
- “Review of ‘Jewish Tradition and the Non-Traditional Jew’, ed. J. J. Schacter,” Studies in Contemporary Jewry, vol. 11 (1995): 326-328
- “Review of ‘Ethics of Responsibility: Pluralistic Approaches to Covenantal Ethics’, by Walter S. Wurzburger,” Jewish Action, vol. 56, no. 2 (Winter 1995): 95-96
- “R. Menahem Ha-Me’iri: Aspects of an Intellectual Profile,” Journal of Jewish Thought and Philosophy, no. 5 (1995): 63-79
- “Tikkun Olam,” Tradition, vol. 29, no. 2 (Winter 1995): 5-43
- “The Appointment of Courts in Maimonidean Halakha,” Sinai, no. 115 (1995): 138-148 (Hebrew)
- “Additional Sources for the Tradition ‘He Held Sinai Above Them as a Cask,” Bar-Ilan Annual, vol. 26-27 (1995): 131-134 (Hebrew)
- “Review of ‘Peshat and Derash: Plain and Applied Meaning in Rabbinic Exegesis’, by David Weiss Halivni,” Studies in Contemporary Jewry, vol. 10 (1995): 384-386
- “Maimonidean Structures of Institutional Authority: Sefer Hamitzvot Aseh 172-177,” Dine Israel, vol. 17 (1993-1994): 103-126
- “Even if They Tell You Right is Left’: The Validity of Moral Authority in the Halakha and its Limitations,” in Moshe Beer, ed., Studies in Halakhic and Jewish Thought Presented to Emanuel Rackman (Ramat-Gan, Bar-Ilan University Press, 1994), 221-242 (Hebrew)
- “Mine and Thine: The Problem of Priority in Civil Law (Hashavat Avedah),” Jewish Law Annual, no. 11 (1994): 37-56
- “Biblical Models in the Contemporary Thought of Rabbi J. B. Soloveitchik,” Literature and Theology, vol. 8, no. 3 (September 1994): 236-246
- “The Relationship of the Authority of Rabbinic Enactments and the Holy Temple in an Ancient Ashkenazic Source,” Sinai, no. 112 (1993): 162-165 (Hebrew)
- “Muhtasib and Shoter: The Shape of Cultural Diffusion,” in Jesus Pelaez del Rosal, ed., Sobre la vida Y obra de Maimonides (Cordoba: Ediciones El Almendro, 1993), 37-43
- “In the Shadow of the Mountain: Consent and Coercion at Sinai,” Jewish Political Studies Review, vol. 4, no. 1 (Spring 1992): 41-53
- “Review of Gershon Weiler, ‘Jewish Theocracy’,” JQR, vol. 82, no. 3-4 (January–April 1992): 498-502
- “The Redemption of Captives in Halakhic Tradition: Problems and Policy,” in Selwyn Ilan Troen and B. Pinkus, eds., Organizing Rescue: National Jewish Solidarity in the Modern Period (London: Frank Cass, 1992), 20-30
- “‘Ideal’ and ‘Real’ in Classical Jewish Political Theory,” in Zvi Gitelman, ed., The Quest for Utopia: Jewish Political Ideas and Institutions through the Ages (Armonk, N.Y.: M. E. Sharpe, 1992), 41-66
- “La Halakha comme norme socio-constitutionelle,” in Shmuel Trigano, ed., La sociéte Juive à travers l’histoire, vol. 2 (Paris: Fayard, 1992), 67-113, 536-540
- “The Import of Early Rabbinic Writings for an Understanding of Judaism in the Hellenistic-Roman Period,” in Shemaryahu Talmon, ed., Jewish Civilization in the Hellenistic-Roman Period (Philadelphia, Trinity Press International, 1991), 64-72
- “Moral Generalizations and Halakhic Discourse,” S’vara, vol. 2, no. 1 (Spring 1991): 8-12
- “Hast Thou Chosen Us to Rule? The Political Dimension of Israel’s Election in the Sages’ Literature,” in Shmuel Almog and Michael Heyd, eds., Chosen People, Elect Nation, and Universal Mission (Jerusalem: Shazar, 1991), 99-120 (Hebrew)
- “Communal Law in the Middle Ages,” in Daniel J. Elazar, ed., Am ve-Edah (Jerusalem: Ruben Mass: Jerusalem, 1991), 246-273 (Hebrew)
- “Holy War in Maimonidean Law,” in Joel L. Kraemer, ed., Perspectives on Maimonides: Philosophical and Historical Studies (Oxford: Littman Library, 1991), 209-220
- “On Political Revolution in the Jewish Tradition,” in Daniel J. Elazar, ed., Authority, Power and Leadership in the Jewish Polity: Cases and Issues (New York, University Press of America, 1991), 295-30
- “Where Do We Stand in the Study of Maimonidean Halakhah?” in Isadore Twersky, ed., Studies in Maimonides (Cambridge, MA: Harvard University Press, 1990), 1-30
- “Maimonides and Meiri on the Legitimacy of Non-Judaic Religion,” in Leo Landman, ed., Scholars and Scholarship: The Interaction between Judaism and Other Cultures (New York: Yeshiva University Press, 1990), 27-35
- “Oral Law as Institution in Maimonides,” in Ira Robinson, et al., eds., The Thought of Moses Maimonides: Philosophical and Legal Studies (Lewiston: The Edwin Mellen Press, 1990), 167-182
- “On Individual and Communal Prayer,” Sinai, no. 106 (1990): 255-264 (Hebrew)
- “Review of Contemporary Jewish Religious Thought,” Studies in Contemporary Jewry, vol. 6 (1990): 389-391
- “Ideal and Real in Classical Jewish Political Theory Jewish Political Studies Review, vol. 2, no. 1-2 (Spring 1990): 43-66
- “Muhtasib and Shoter: The Shape of Cultural Diffusion,” Shenaton ha-Mishpat ha-Ivri, no. 14-15 (1988-1989): 89-94 (Hebrew)
- “The State of Israel in Halakhic Thought,” in Shubert Spero and Yitzchak Pessin, eds., Religious Zionism: After 40 Years of Statehood (Jerusalem: Mesilot, 1989), 254-276
- “The Paradoxes of Freedom in Judaic Tradition,” in Annual Sol Feinstone Memorial Lecture (Pennsylvania: Gratz College, 1989), 1-16
- “On the Jewish People in the Writings of Rabbi J.B. Soloveitchik,” Tradition, vol. 24, no. 3 (Spring 1989): 21-43
- “Redemption of Captives in the Halakhic Tradition,” in Benjamin Pinkus and Ilan Troen, eds., Jewish Solidarity in the Modern Era (Beer-Sheva: BGU, 1988), 19-27 (Hebrew)
- “The State of Israel as Viewed by Contemporary Halakhic Authorities,” Dine Israel, vol. 13-14 (1986-1988): 21-42 (Hebrew)
- “Review of Eliezer Berkovits, The Nature and Function of Halakha; and J.B. Soloveitchik, Halakhic Man,” Studies in Contemporary Jewry, no. 3 (1988): 318-322
- “Consent at Sinai: The Midrashic Tradition,” Jewish Political Tradition Working Paper, no. 28 (Ramat-Gan: Bar-Ilan University, 1988), 1-8 (Hebrew)
- “Review of ‘The Halakhic Process: A Systematic Analysis’, by Joel Roth,” JQR, vol. 78, no. 3-4 (Jan.-April 1988): 299-303
- “The Karaites in Maimonidean Law,” Tehumin, vol. 8 (1988): 501-510 (Hebrew)
- “The Status of the Resident Alien in Maimonidean Law,” Sinai, no. 101 (1988): 44-52 (Hebrew)
- “The ‘Havinenu’ Prayer in Maimonidean Law,” Sidra 4 (1988): 5-15 (Hebrew)
- “The Ephraimite Exodus from Egypt: A Re-Evaluation,” Jerusalem Studies in Jewish Thought, no. 5 (1986): 1-13
- "Review of ‘Legal Values and Judaism’, by Zeev Falk,” Dine Israel, vol. 12 (1986): 300-319 (Hebrew)
- “The Attitude of Menachem HaMeiri toward Gentiles: Between Apologetics and Internalization?” Zion, vol. 51, no. 2 (1986): 153- (Hebrew). Reprinted with adapted translation: “The Attitude of Menahem HaMeiri’s Toward Gentiles: Apologetics or Worldview?” Binah, vol. 3 (1994): 119-135.
- “Tradition and Institutional Authority: On Oral Law in Maimonides,” Da’at, no. 16 (1986): 11-27 (Hebrew)
- “Studies in Rashi: Governance,” Eshel Beer Sheva, vol. 3 (1986): 137-148 (Hebrew)
- "Universal Rule in Maimonides", Values and War (Alon Shevut, 1985), pp. 155–173
- "Rabbis Romans, and Martyrdom", Tradition, XXI, 3 (1984), pp. 54–62
- "I.Twersky's Introduction to Maimonides' Code", Pe'amim XI (1982), pp. 135–141
- "On Human Dignity in Rabbinic Law," Annual of Jewish Law, IX- X(1982-3), pp. 127–185
- "The Monarchic Imperative in Rabbinic Thought", AJS Review VII- VIII(1982-
- 1983), pp. 15–40
- "The Uses of the Term 'LeSaber Et Ha'Ozen'...", Sinai XCI (1982), 241- 244
- "The License to Teach and its Social Significance in Maimonides", Tarbiz LI(1982), pp. 577–588. Reprinted in M. Idel, ed., A Reader in Maimonidean Research
- (Jerusalem, 1985), pp. 416–426
- "Joy in Maimonides' Ethics", Eshel Be'er Sheva, II (1980), pp. 145–164.
- "A Further Note on Torah SheBe'Al Peh", Sinai LVII (1980), pp. 88.
- "Filial Piety in Law and Lore", The Jewish Family on Our Time, II (1980), pp. 43–73
- "The Idea of Oral Law in R. Sherira's Epistle", Da'at IV (1980), pp. 5–16
- "First-fruits in Rabbinic Law", Eshel Be'er Sheva, I (1976), pp. 78–88
- "The Personal Status of Captive and Apostate Women in the Middle Ages", Annual of Jewish Law (Hebrew U.), III (1977), pp. 35–117
- "Notes on Women and Mizvot", Amudim, 379 (1977), pp. 260–261
- "Torah and Inspiration in the Dead Sea Scrolls and Psalms 119", Bet Miqra III (62) (1975), pp. 382–388.
- "The Plural Torah", De'ot XLIV (1975), pp. 270–275
- "The Sources of the Term Torah SheBe 'Al Peh," Tarbiẕ XLIII (1974), 496-498
- "J. L. Margaliot as Halakhist", HUCA XLIV (1973), pp. 19–25
- "The Spoils of Egypt in Rabbinic Sources", Sinai XLIII (1970), pp. 233– 243
- "Communal Law in the Middle Ages", Dinei Yisrael IX (1978–80), pp. 127–164 (Translation of this article published in "Individual and Community in the Middle Ages", in D. Elazar, ed., Kinship and Consent (Ramat Gan, 1981), 217-258.
- "On Political Structures - Four Medieval Comments", Jewish Journal of Sociology, XXII,1 (June, 1980), 47-58
- "The Concept of 'Oral Law' in Maimonides", Jewish Law Annual, 1 (1978) 108-122
- "Who Is Not a Jew? - The Medieval Discussion", Israel Law Review, XI, 3 (July, 1976), pp. 369–390
- "Nullification of Idolatry in Rabbinic Law" Proceedings, American Academy for Jewish Research, XLI (1974)1-44.
- "Bastards and Proselytes in 4Q Florilegium and Rabbinic Sources", Revue de Qumran, V, 2 (1974), 80-85
- "R. Yohanan, Idolatry, and Public Privilege", Journal for the Study of Judaism V,3 (1974), 31-38
- "Kaddish and Other Accidents", Tradition, XIV, 3 (1974), 80-85
- "Mosaics, Prostration, and Worship in the Talmud", Bulletin of the Institute of Jewish Studies, II (London, 1974), 19-41.
- "Exclusion From the Community and Atimeia", Vetus Testamentum, XXIV, 3 (1974), 357-360.
- "The Function of Dina DeMalkhuta Dina in the Medieval Jewish Community". Jewish Journal of Sociology, XV, 2 (Winter, 1973),213- 219.
- "Hefker bet din Hefker in Talmudic and Medieval Law", Dinei Yisrael, IV (TelAviv U.,1973), 213-219
- "The Tannaim and Art, Problems and Prospects", Perspectives in Jewish Learning (Chicago), V (1973), 13-27
- "A Gift of Strenae to the Partiarch ", IEJ, XXII (1972), 150-152
- "Sheliah Zibbur: " Historical and Phenomenological Considerations," Tradition XII, 1 (Summer, 1971), 69-77
- "A Rabbinic Response to the Messiah Doctrine of the Scrolls?"Journal of Biblical Literature, XC (1971), 3, 330-332
- "Method in the Study of Talmud", Journal of the American Academy of Religion, XXXIX,2 (June, 1971) 186-192
- "The Sale of Animals to Gentiles in Talmudic Law", Jewish Quarterly Review, LXI, 3 ( Jan. 1971), 188-198
- "Jews and the Ecumenical Dialogue"; Tradition, XI, 2 (Summer, 1970), 103-110
- "Public and Personal Prayer", Tradition, X, 3-4 (Summer, 1969),22-28
- "Man and Nature in the Sabbatical Year", Tradition, IX, 4 (Winter, 1966) 48-55
- "The Limits of Prayer", Judaism XV, 2 (Spring, 1966), 48-55. Reprinted: S. Schwarzschild, ed., Understanding Jewish Prayer (New York, 1972), 112-121; D. Deroven, ed., Prayer (New York, 1970), 41-51
- "Capital Punishment - The Classic Jewish Discussion", Judaism, XIV, (Spring, 1965), 150-172. Republished: A. Corre, ed. Understanding the Talmud (N.Y. 1978) pp. 313–325; M. Kellner, Contemporary Jewish Ethics (N.Y. 1978) 310-320.
- Nature in Psalms", Judaism, XIII, 1 (Winter, 1964), 29-37

=== Encyclopedia articles ===
- "Messiah in Rabbinic Thought", Encyclopedia Judaica, 11: 1410-12. Jerusalem: Keter Publishing House, 1972
- "Even Shetiyyah", EJ, 6: 985-6.
- "Priests in Rabbinic Law", EJ, 1088-9.
- "Israel, Kingdom of (Aggadah)", EJ, 9:1047-8.
- "Nasi", EJ, 12: 833-5.
- “Sherira Gaon,” in The Encyclopedia of Religion, vol. 13 (New York: Macmillan, 1987), 241
- “Halakhah: History,” Ibid., vol. 6 (New York: Macmillan, 1987), 158-164
- “Hai Ga’on,” Ibid, vol. 6 (New York: Macmillan, 1987), 153
- “Gershom b. Yehudah,” Ibid., vol. 5 (New York: Macmillan, 1987), 536
- “Yizhak Alfasi,” Ibid., vol. 1 (New York: Macmillan, 1987), 203-204
- “Tosafot,” in R.J.Zwi Werblowsky and Geoffrey Wigoder, eds., Oxford Dictionary of the Jewish Religion (Oxford: OUP, 1997), 699
- “Hiddushim,” in R.J.Zwi Werblowsky and Geoffrey Wigoder, eds., Oxford Dictionary of the Jewish Religion (Oxford: OUP, 1997), 321
- "Reasons for the Commandments" (supplement), EJ (Second Edition), Detroit: Macmillan and Keter Publishing House, 2007. Vol. 5, p. 86 and p. 90.

=== Books edited ===
- Eshel Be'er Sheva, Vol. I (1976). With R. Bonfil, Y. Salmon.
- Eshel Be'er Sheva, Vol. II (1980). With R. Bonfil, Y. Salmon.
- Eshel Be'er Sheva, Vol. III (1986). With Y. Salmon, E. Yasif
- Me'ah She'arim: Studies ...in Memory of Isadore Twersky (2001). With E. Fleisher, Horowitz, B. Septimus
- Shabbat: Idea, History, Reality (Hebrew), BGU: Beer Sheba, 2004.

=== Books written ===
- Honor Thy Father and Mother: Filial Responsibility in Jewish Law and Ethics, (New York:Ktav Pub. House, 1975,1976).
- Ekronot Mediniyim Be-Mishnat Ha-Rambam. Trans. "Political Concepts in Maimonidean Halakha." (Jer.:Bar Ilan, 1983). Awarded Jerusalem Prize in Jewish Studies, 1985. 2nd ed., revised, 319pp. 2001
- Prayer in Maimonidean Halakha (Hebrew) Beersheba and Jerusalem: BGU Press and Mossad Bialik, 1994.
- In the Rabbi's Garden: Adam and Eve in the Midrash, (N.J.:Aronson, 1997).
- Authority and Dissent in Maimonidean Law, in Hebrew. (Tel Aviv, 2002)
- The Death of Moses: Readings in Midrash, (Alon Shvut:Herzog Academic College, 2008).
- Society and Self : On the Writings of Rabbi Joseph B. Soloveitchik, (N.Y.:OU Press, 2012).
- "Upon them we shall meditate": Studies on Maimonides’ “Laws of the Study of Torah,” [in Hebrew] (Be'er Sheva: Ben Gurion Univ., 2017).

== See also ==
- List of Israel Prize recipients
