= Purim humor =

Jewish humor during the celebration of Purim

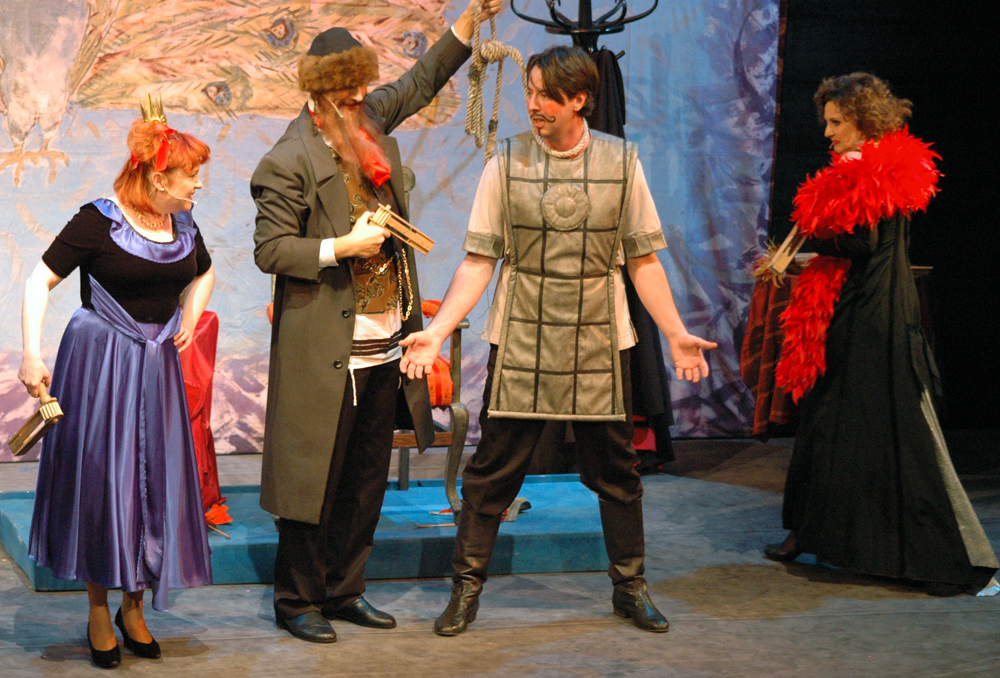
A Purim spiel by the Jewish Theatre, Warsaw, 2009

Purim humor, Purim jokes, and Purim pranks are elements of joyful celebration of the holiday of Purim. Notable expressions of Purim humor of long tradition are Purim Torah read by Purim Rabbi and Purim spiel.

== Purim Torah and Purim spiel ==
Purim Torah are humorous and satirical comments in the learned style of talmudic or halakhic comments in relation to Purim and read during Purim by a Purim rabbi. A notable historical example is the 14th century Masekhet Purim (A Tractate on Purim) by Kalonymus ben Kalonymus, condemned by many scholars.

A Purim spiel ("Purim play") is a dramatization of classical stories, most often of the Book of Esther, in which the story of Purim is recounted. This tradition dates at least to mid-16th century. Over time it acquired the comic character. Today, Purim spiels can be comedies about anything related to Jews and Judaism.

Before the Purim of 1993, a parody on parody appeared on soc.culture.jewish in a thread titled "Talmud Fortran" with commentary on computer programming in the style of Purim Torah. Some comments: "As I recall you are not (in certain days) permitted to separate the good from the bad. How does this apply to debugging programs during these days?" - "So long as there is less than one part in 60 of bugs in the code, it is kosher...<>"

== Purim jokes ==
Purim jokes are on subjects associated with the things and events related to Purim and its history traditionally told on this day. Many of them are "in-jokes" which are difficult to understand without the knowledge of the Jewish culture. For example: "Why is the Shabbat before Purim called Shabbat Zachor? BECAUSE THAT IS THE LAST THING YOU WILL REMEMBER FOR A LONG TIME!" (Note: Besides terminology (Shabbat, Zachor, Shabbat Zachor), the understanding of the joke relies on the awareness of the tradition of heavy inebriation, allowable during Purim.) Moritz Steinschneider wrote that some Purim jokes can be recorded only in "Jargon": Was soll mir die [sic] פ in ןמה?—Ei, sie steht ja nicht!—Warum steht sie nicht?—Wozu soll sie mir?—Das ist doch meine אישק (Frage)!.

There is a cycle of question-answer jokes, kind of pranks, arising from klotz kashes, in which a rabbi (especially a Purim rabbi during silly Purim Torah discussions) or a teacher is asked a silly question. (Nathan Lopes Cardozo writes that a good teacher must have a knack of turning a real klutz kashe into a profound one. Below is an example of a klotz kashe joke:

Dear Esteemed Rabbi: Ever since McDonald’s came to Israel, I have this craving for a real cheeseburger. As an observant Jew, what can I do about it?

Dear Glutton: The Torah says: “You should not boil a kid in its mother’s milk.” It does not say: “You shouldn’t boil a cow in its own milk!” So according to Jewish Law, you can make yourself a real cheeseburger this way:
Go to a kosher slaughterhouse and have them remove the cow’s milk right after it’s been slaughtered. According to the Halakha, like everything else in a slaughtered animal, that milk is considered now to be “meat” (b'sari). Then all you have to do is to make cheese from that milk, and then slop that “meaty” cheese on real kosher beef – and voila, a kosher cheeseburger!

By the way, if you have any of that milk left over, you can finish off your meat meal with a milkshake!! However, I do suggest that you not leave any of this milk for the next day because you might accidentally drink it with your regular cheese sandwich – and then you would be transgressing the kosher laws in a very unusual fashion.

The Judaism section of the Stack Exchange Network of question-and-answer websites named Mi Yodeya has a special policy about posting Purim Torah klotz kashes. In particular, it says: "Purim Torah questions are on-topic only once a year, and will be closed after Purim."

== Purim pranks ==
Purim pranks are a notable part of the celebration of Purim. Some or them may be insulting and even harmful. There is a scholarship on what Halakha says on whether harm, insult (lashon hara), or injury – whether physical (towards property or a person) or verbal – are admissible in the course of Purim pranks or jokes. There are various interpretations, however Rav Yosef Zvi Rimon comes to a conclusion that insults and minor physical harm are admissible as long they are sincere expressions of joy of mitzva and the harmful acts were not of evil intention; this kind of humor must be used with caution. Purim jokes are for the joy of mitzva, not for just jesting. Purim spiels may include a good deal of insults and foul language directed both at biblical characters and modern real persons.

Since Purim pranks are commonly delivered in a dead serious tone, they may be misunderstood for a real thing. For example, in March 2017, a prank pulled by the officials of the town of Psagot went too far: the social media got ahold of a letter on local official stationery that Jared Kushner and Ivanka Trump would be visiting the town for Shabbos and Kushner would be delivering a dvar Torah in the local synagogue. Hundreds of people from the nearby places phoned the residents of Psagot to ask for a stay during the event, while leftist groups started arranging buses with protesters.

== See also ==
- The Megillah, a musical by Itzik Manger in the style of Purim spiel
- Adloyada
- Latke–Hamantash Debate
- Feast of Fools
