= Purim costume =

Costumes worn on Purim

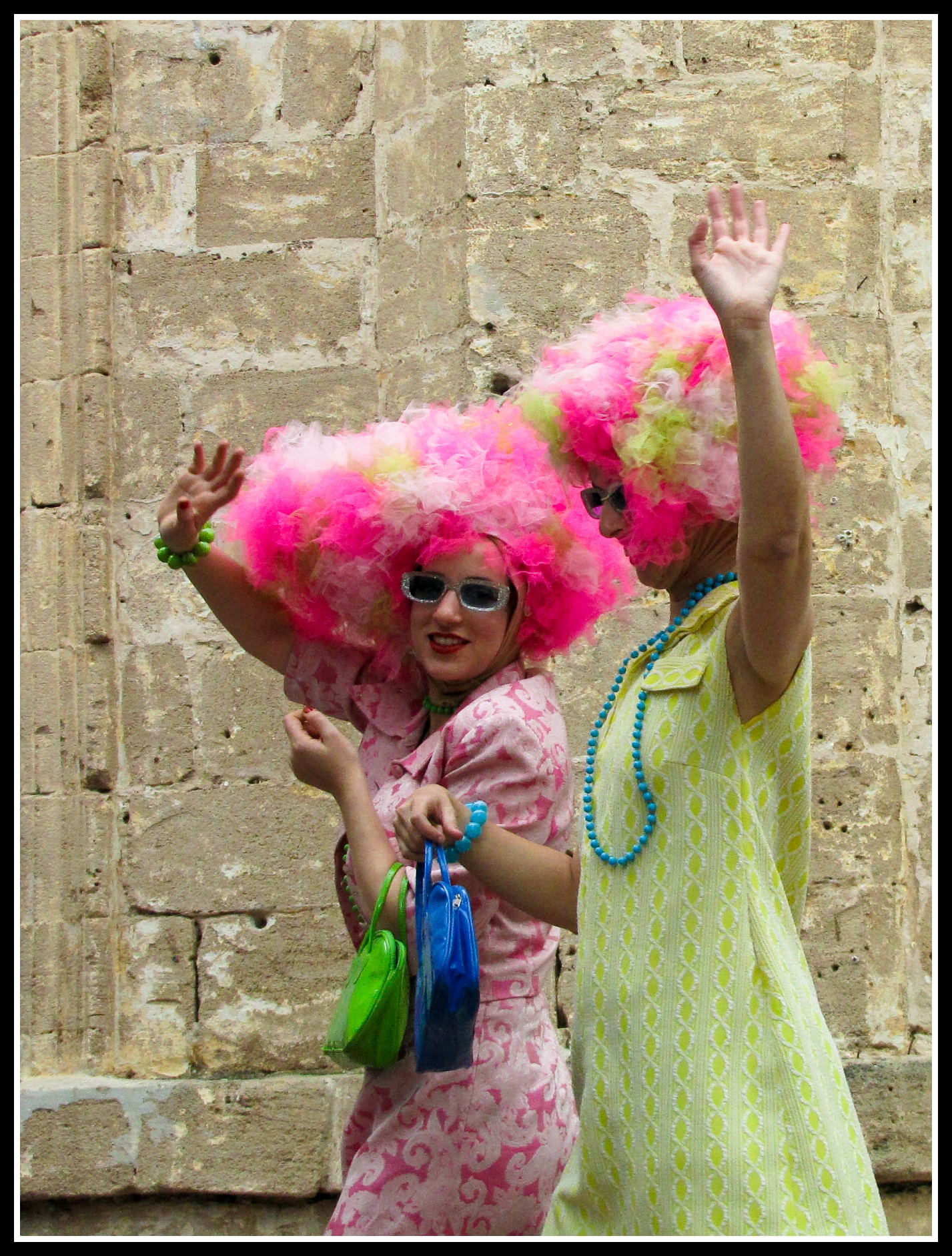
Purim, 2010

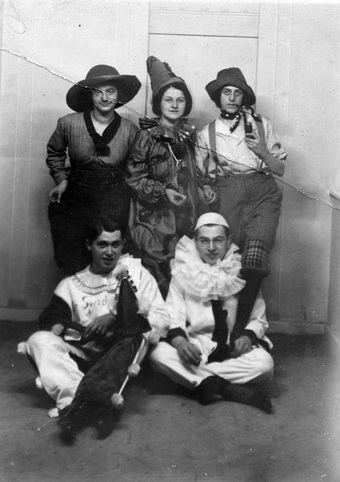
Purim costumes, 1914

One tradition attached to the Jewish holiday of Purim is the wearing of costumes. The tradition may have originated among Italian Jews at the end of the 15th century. There are several reasons given as to how the tradition is connected to the holiday.

== History ==
There are no sources in the Talmud, Mishnah or Gaonic writings that mention the custom. Bibliographer Moritz Steinschneider thought that the custom of masquerading in costumes and the wearing of masks possibly originated among the Italian Jews at the end of the 15th century and was influenced by the Roman carnival, as Purim usually coincides with Mardi Gras. Rabbi Yair Hoffman writes that Steinschneider was mistaken and offers other theories. Jewish philosopher Kalonymus ben Kalonymus (1286–1328), an author of an early Purim Torah, Masekhet Purim, mentioned cross-dressing: "The young men of Israel will boast and exult in honor and glory, because they will go crazy, and because they will exult, this one will wear a woman’s dress and have huge breasts, and this one will be like one of the empty ones, with a drum and a dance of joy and threesomes, some with men and women". Another early mention is by 15th-century Rabbi Judah Minz, who wrote that there is no prohibition involved in dressing up on Purim, even in dressing like a woman, since the reason is to imbue happiness and not for the purpose of immorality. This is quoted by the Ramah in Shulchan Aruch Orach Chayim 696:8.

The practice spread across Europe, but was only introduced into Middle Eastern countries during the 19th century. The first Jewish codifier to mention the custom was Judah Minz. Iranian Jews use traditional Persian costumes and masks.

During World War II, Purim started becoming commercialized. The rise of Halloween-esque costumes in Israel took place in the following decades, after the founding of the state and in the 1960s and 1970s, when it was economically possible.

== Reasons ==
The primary reason for masquerading is that it alludes to the hidden aspect of the miracle of Purim, which was "disguised" by natural events but was really the work of the Almighty.

Disguises also allow greater anonymity for givers and recipients of tzedakah (charity) and mishloach manot publicly given out on the Purim day as part of the celebration, thus preserving the dignity of the recipient.

Additional explanations are based on:

- Targum on Esther (Chapter 3) which states that Haman's hate for Mordecai stemmed from Jacob's 'dressing up' like Esau to receive Isaac's blessings;
- Others who "dressed up" or hid whom they were in the story of Esther:
  - Esther not revealing that she is a Jewess, and her name is similar to the Hebrew word for "hidden";
  - Mordecai wearing sackcloth;
  - Mordecai being dressed in the king's clothing;
  - "[M]any from among the peoples of the land became Jews; for the fear of the Jews was fallen upon them" (Esther 8:17); on which the Vilna Gaon comments that those gentiles were not accepted as converts because they only made themselves look Jewish on the outside, as they did this out of fear;
- To recall the episodes that only happened in "outside appearance" (as stated in Talmud Megillah 12a) that the Jews bowed to Haman only from the outside, internally holding strong to their Jewish belief, and likewise, God only gave the appearance as if he was to destroy all the Jews while internally knowing that he will save them.

== Criticism ==
Rabbi Isaiah Horowitz criticized the custom of Purim costumes, writing that it is a frivolous custom to be avoided. Rabbi Samuel Aboab argued that it involves following non-Jewish practices, and Rabbi Meir Mazuz strongly opposed it due to its origins in Christian carnivals and other reasons.

Many rabbis have strongly criticized the practice of cross-dressing on Purim. Rabbi Chaim Yosef David Azulai lamented that Jews were adopting non-Jewish customs and succumbing to the evil inclination, thus violating Torah commandments on the holy day of Purim. Rabbi Joel Sirkis raised another concern, stating that cross-dressing leads to inappropriate mixing of genders, deeming it an improper custom. Rabbi Moshe Rivkas added that many calamities and decrees arose from this practice. In contrast, some authorities like Rabbi Judah Minz permitted the custom and even sharply criticized those who opposed it.
