= Purim spiel =

Ensemble of festive practices during Purim

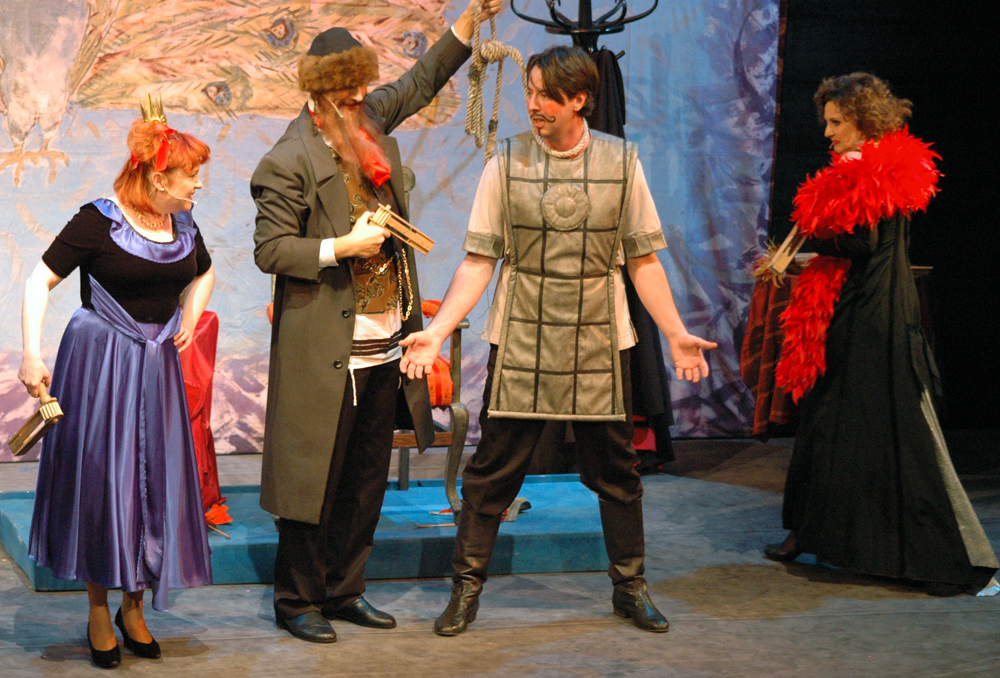
Purim spiel performance in the Jewish Theatre of Warsaw, Poland in March 2009

A Purim spiel (also spelled Purimshpil, Yiddish: פּורימשפּיל, from Yiddish shpil 'game, play', see also spiel) or Purim play is an ensemble of festive practices for Purim. It is usually a comic dramatization of the Book of Esther, the central text and narrative that describes what transpired on Purim and why it is celebrated as an important Jewish holiday.

== History ==
The Purim spiel is considered the "only genuine folk theater that has survived a thousand years in European culture." Integrating texts, theater, music, dance, songs, mimes, and costumes, the Purim spiel is considered to be the origin of Yiddish theatre. The descriptive term "Purim spiel" became widely used among Ashkenazi Jews as early as the mid-1500s.

By the 18th century in eastern Romania and some other parts of Eastern Europe, Purim spiels had evolved into broad-ranging satires with music and dance, for which the story of Esther was little more than a pretext. Since satire was deemed inappropriate for a synagogue, these events were usually performed outdoors in the synagogue courtyard.

By the mid-19th century, some routines were based on other stories, such as Joseph sold by his brothers, Daniel, or the Binding of Isaac. Other traditional forms of Purim spiel have included puppet shows for children, reenacting the Purim story with the Purim characters performing comic antics.

In 2015, the French Ministry of Culture added the Purim spiel to its Inventory of the Intangible Cultural Heritage of France.

== Modern practice ==
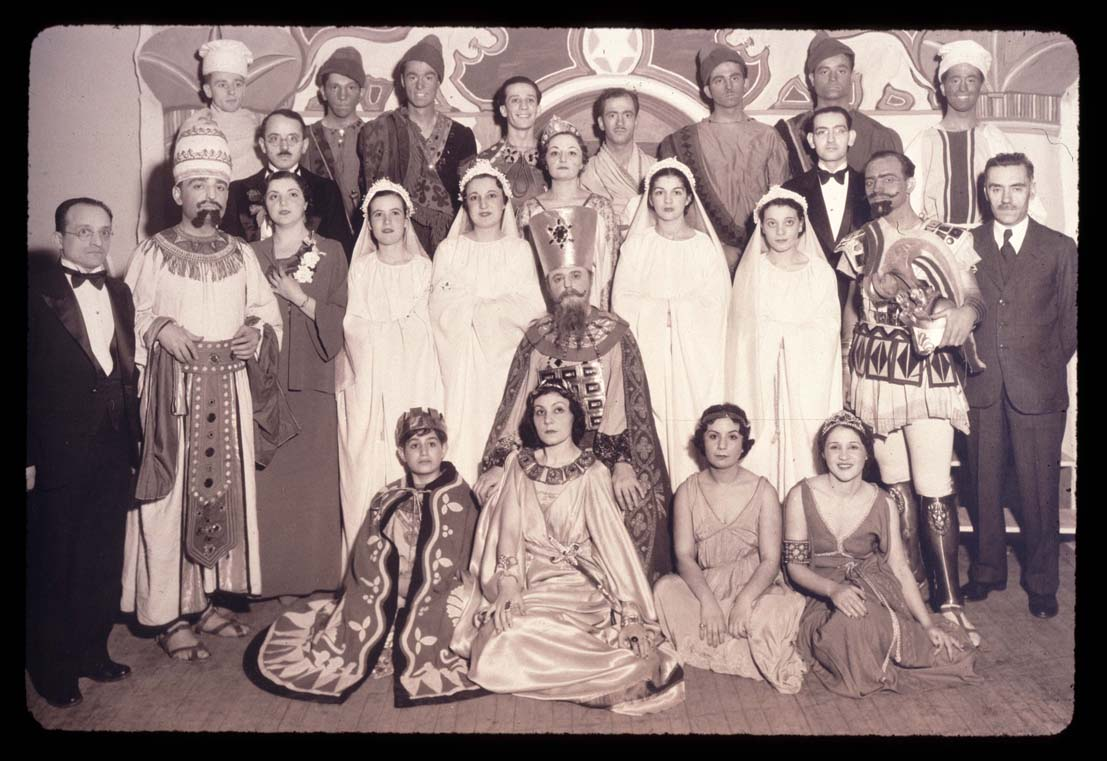
Cast of the Purim play staged by the Sephardic Community in New York, 1936

Purim spiels are performed annually in many American synagogues, and in Jewish communities in much of Europe. In France, for example, Purim plays continue to be widely performed in active Ashkenazi communities.

In many modern-day synagogues, a Purim spiel is an informal theatrical production with costumed participants, often including children. Typically, each congregation writes its own new Purim spiel every year, or acquires a new script from elsewhere. Purim spiels often include parodies of popular songs or well-known musicals. Purim spiels are often used to satirically address modern social and political issues through the biblical narrative, "using the ancient story to poke fun at current reality."

== See also ==
- The Megillah, a 1965 Israeli musical in Yiddish based on the 1936 book Songs of the Megillah by Itzik Manger
- Purim humor
