= Purim Torah =

Humorous and satirical comments in the learned style of Talmudic or Halakhic comments

Purim Torah is humorous and satirical comments that constitute a parody of the learned style of talmudic or halakhic comments customarily read, recited from memory or authored on or for the Jewish holiday of Purim. Purim Torah can be simple or elaborate.

== History ==
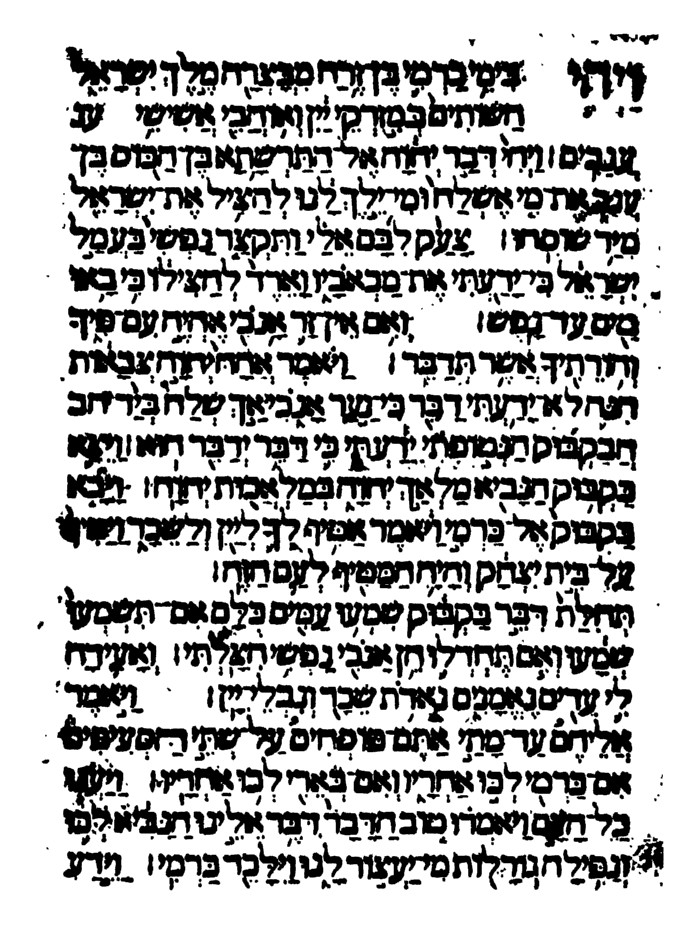
Prophet's Bottle (חבקבוק הנביא, a pun with חבקוק הנביא, "Habakkuk the Prophet"; A parody written in Biblical Hebrew about a war between water and wine

While one may find various forms of Jewish humor and satire in Talmud, parodies in Jewish literature started appearing only in the twelfth century. In some examples, the boundary between humor and irreverence is very thin. An example of such is the fourteenth century Masekhet Purim by Kalonymus ben Kalonymus, condemned by many scholars.

Purim Torah authors, often displaying an amazing grasp of Jewish knowledge, playfully use some of the far-fetched methods of Talmudic logic and Biblical exegesis in order to reach absurd conclusions. Another popular method is "play on words" where a reasonable word or phrase is purposefully misinterpreted as something absurd that sounds similar. For example the verse in the Megilla that states "Vashti made a feast for the women" sounds similar (in Hebrew) to "Vashti was made like [as big as] two women".

Ashkenazi culture has a variation of the Purim Torah that is acted out, often with elaborate costumes known as a Purim Shpiel, from the Yiddish for "Purim play".

== Talmudic sources ==
Eliezer Segal points to a passage in the Talmud as the first suggestion of a Purim Torah. In a passage on Hulin 139b, a sage offers up a series of interesting puns in order to find allusions to characters from the Purim story in the Torah. Others such as Israel Davidson state that while there is humor present in the Talmud, calling any part of it a parody is simply untrue.

== See also ==
- Purim humor
