= Lords of Misrule =

Lords of Misrule may refer to:

- Lords of Misrule, a 1976 novel by Nigel Tranter
- "Lords of Misrule" a short story in the Viriconium series by M. John Harrison
- Lords of Misrule (comics), a series of comics by a number of authors including John Tomlinson
- "The Lords of Misrule", a short story by Dana Cameron
- Lords of Misrule: Mardi Gras and the Politics of Race in New Orleans, a book by James Gill
- The Lords of Misrule: Poems 1992-2002, a book by X. J. Kennedy

== See also ==
- Lord of Misrule, from which the phrase is derived
