= Jeffrey L. Rubenstein =

American scholar of Talmud and Rabbinic Literature

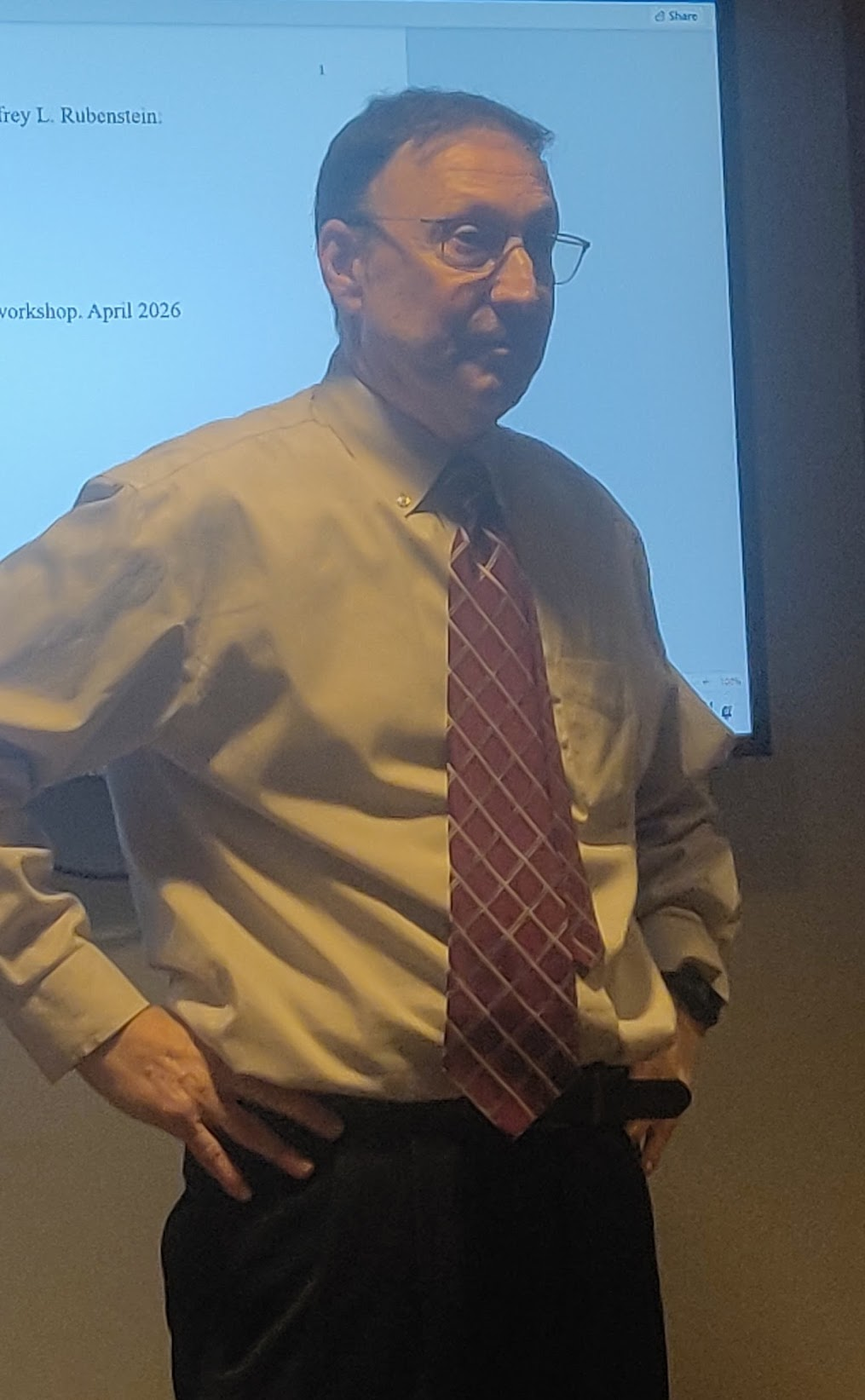
- Born: 1964 (age 61–62); Johannesburg, South Africa
- Education: Oberlin College (BA); Jewish Theological Seminary (MA); Columbia University (PhD)
- Known for: Literary analysis of the Babylonian Talmud, History of Sukkot
- Scientific career
- Fields: Talmud, Rabbinic literature, Jewish studies
- Workplaces: New York University
- Doctoral advisor: David Weiss Halivni

Jeffrey L. Rubenstein is an American scholar and academic. He is the Skirball Professor of Talmud and Rabbinic Literature in the Department of Hebrew and Judaic Studies at New York University (NYU). His research primarily explores Talmudic narratives, specifically the literary and cultural analysis of the stories within the Babylonian Talmud.

In 2012, Rubenstein was elected a Fellow of the American Academy for Jewish Research.

== Education ==
Rubenstein graduated from Oberlin College in 1985 with a degree in Religion and subsequently received a Master’s degree in Jewish Studies from the Jewish Theological Seminary in 1987. He earned his Ph.D. in Religion from Columbia University in 1992 under the supervision of David Weiss Halivni.

== Academic career ==
Rubenstein holds the Skirball Professorship of Talmud and Rabbinic Literature at New York University, where he teaches courses on Talmud, rabbinic literature, Jewish ethics, and “Texts and Ideas” in the NYU CORE curriculum.

He is active in scholarly associations such as the Society for Jewish Ethics, the Association for Jewish Studies, and the Jewish Law Association.

Rubenstein’s scholarship is frequently cited in academic studies of rabbinic narrative and law. His narrative-focused approach has shaped contemporary understanding of rabbinic storytelling as both literary and cultural phenomena.

== Research interests ==
Rubenstein specializes in Talmudic stories, Midrash, the historical development of Jewish law and liturgy, and the study of ethical ideas in rabbinic texts. His scholarship also includes work on the Dead Sea Scrolls and Syriac Christian literature from late antiquity.

== Selected bibliography ==
=== Books authored ===
- The History of Sukkot in the Second Temple and Rabbinic Periods (Brown Judaica Series 302, 1995). ISBN 978-1946527288
- Talmudic Stories: Narrative Art, Composition and Culture (Baltimore: Johns Hopkins University Press, 1999). ISBN 978-0801861468
- Rabbinic Stories (New Jersey: Paulist Press, 2002). ISBN 978-0809140244
- The Culture of the Babylonian Talmud (Baltimore: Johns Hopkins University Press, 2003). ISBN 978-0801873881
- Stories of the Babylonian Talmud (Baltimore: Johns Hopkins University Press, 2010). ISBN 978-0801894497
- The Land of Truth: Talmud Tales, Timeless Teachings (Nebraska: Jewish Publication Society and University of Nebraska Press, Nebraska, 2018). ISBN 978-0827613089

=== Books translated and edited ===
- The Formation of the Babylonian Talmud by David Weiss Halivni (Oxford University Press, 2013). ISBN 978-0199739882
- Creation and Composition: The Contribution of the Bavli Redactors (Stammaim) to the Aggada (Tübingen: Mohr-Siebeck, 2005). ISBN 978-3161486920
- The Aggadah of the Bavli and its Cultural World (Providence, RI: SBL Press, 2018). ISBN 978-1946527080
- Studies in Rabbinic Narrative, Volume 1 (Brown Judaic Studies, 2021).
- Studies in Rabbinic Narrative, Volume 2 (Brown Judaic Studies, 2024).
