= Kalonymus ben Kalonymus =

French Jewish philosopher and translator

Kalonymus ben Kalonymus ben Meir
- קלונימוס בן קלונימוס
- Born: 1286; Arles
- Died: after 1328; Arles
- Education: Philosophy and rabbinical literature at Salon-de-Provence
- Occupations: Translator, writer

Kalonymus ben Kalonymus ben Meir (Hebrew: קלונימוס בן קלונימוס), also romanized as Qalonymos ben Qalonymos or Calonym ben Calonym, also known as Maestro Calo (Arles, 1286 – died after 1328), was a Jewish philosopher, translator, and hakham of Provence.

Kalonymus studied philosophy and rabbinical literature at Salon-de-Provence under the direction of Abba Mari ben Eligdor and Moses ben Solomon of Beaucaire. Kalonymus also studied medicine, but seems not to have practiced it.

Kalonymus was from a prominent and distinguished Provençal Jewish family. Kalonymus and Kalonymus's father each bore the title Nasi (prince).

== At Rome ==
About 1314, Kalonymus settled at Avignon, and there later became associated with Robert, King of Naples, who sent Kalonymus (with letters of recommendation) on a scientific mission to Rome. Kalonymus's learning and character gained the consideration of the Roman Jewish notables; and when family members, finding that Kalonymus's sojourn at Rome was longer than had been anticipated, recalled Kalonymus, the poet Immanuel the Roman wrote a letter to Nasi Samuel of Arles, protesting in the name of the Jewish community of Rome against Kalonymus's departure. According to Moritz Steinschneider and Gross, Kalonymus was the poet referred to by Immanuel (ib. p. 28) as having pleaded the cause of the Roman Jews before the pope at Avignon in 1321, but this assertion needs confirmation since the exact dates of Kalonymus's stay in Rome can not be ascertained. Heinrich Graetz and Adolf Neubauer believe Kalonymus went to Rome after a sojourn in Catalonia, which was in 1322, and believe the fact that Kalonymus does not mention Rome in Eben Boḥan confirms this supposition. In 1328 Kalonymus was in Arles, and probably remained there until dying at an unknown date.

== Works ==
Kalonymus acquired a high reputation both as an original writer and as a translator. Kalonymus began a literary career when only twenty years old. Kalonymus's translations, which, with the exception of one that was printed, are all still in manuscript, include the following (arranged in chronological order, the Hebrew titles being those of the translations):

- Ha-'Ammud be-Shoroshe ha-Refuah, translation of the Arabic work Kitab al-'Imad fl Uṣul al-Ṭibb of Ali ibn Ridwan. This translation, completed at Arles Oct. 10, 1307, was the second made by Kalonymus, the first having been lost in 1306 during the banishment of the Jews from France.
- Sefer Galyanus be-Ḥaḳna ube-Kulga, Galen's work on clysters and colic, from the Arabic version of Hunayn ibn Ishaq.
- Sefer Galyanus be-Haḳḳazah, Galen's work on bleeding, probably made from the Arabic version of Hunayn ibn Ishaq.
- Treatise on the five geometrical bodies by Euclid, in relation to the theory of Apollonius of Perga, and the commentary of Simplicius of Cilicia.
- Ha-Dibbur ha-Meshullash, treatise on the triangle, by Abu Sa'adan.
- Sefer Meshalim be-Tishboret, on mathematical propositions.
- Sefer ha-Temunah ha-Ḥittukit, a work on geometry, entitled Fi al-Shakl al-Ḳuṭṭa, by Thābit ibn Qurra.
- Ma'amar be-Iẓṭawwonot ube-Ḥiddudim, treatise on cylinders and cones.
- Bi'ur Sefer Ṭobiḳi, Averroes's commentary on the topics.
- Bi'ur Sufisṭiḳi, Averroes's commentary on sophisms.
- Bi'ur Sefer ha-Mofet, Averroes's large commentary on the second analytics.
- Sefer ha-Ẓemaḥim, treatise on the plants, attributed to Aristotle, with the commentary thereon by Averroes.
- Ma'amar be-Sekel weha-Muskal, treatise on the intellect and the intelligible, by al-Farabi.
- Ma'amar be-Mispar ha-Ḥokmot, on the division of the sciences, by Al-Farabi.
- Sefer ha-Peri ha-Niḳra Meah Dibburim, commentary on the Centiloquium of (Pseudo-)Ptolemy, translated from the Arabic version of Ahmad ibn Yusuf.
- Iggeret be-Ḳiẓẓur ha-Ma'amar be-Moladot, short treatise on nativities, by al-Kindi.
- Iggeret be-'Illot, treatise on the influence of the heavenly bodies on rain, by Al-Kindi.
- The middle commentary of Averroes on physics.
- Sefer ha-Hawayh weha-Hippased, Averroes's middle commentary on generation and corruption.
- Sefer Otot ha-Shamayim, Averroes's middle commentary on meteors.
- Iggeret Ba'ale Ḥayyim, ("Treatise on Animals"), translated from the twenty-first treatise of the Encyclopedia of the Brethren of Purity, published in 1557 at Mantua, and in 1704 at Frankfort-on-the-Main. This translation was rendered into Judæo-German by Enoch ben Ẓebi (Hanover, 1718) and into German, under the title Abhandlung über die Thiere, by Julius Landsberger (Darmstadt, 1882).
- Sefer Mah-she-aḥar ha-Ṭeba' , Averroes's middle commentary on metaphysics.
- Treatise on arithmetic by Nicomachus, accompanied by a commentary of Abu Sulaiman Rabiya ibn Yaḥya.
- Be-'Inyane ha-Kokabim ha-Nebukim, translation of Ptolemy's treatise on the planets.
- Sefer Arshmidah, Archimedes' treatise on the sphere and the cylinder, translated from the Arabic version of Qusta ibn Luqa.
- Iggeret be-Laḥiyt ube-Maṭar, al-Kindi's treatise on humidity and rain.
- Averroes's dissertations on the first book of the Prior Analytics.
- Iggeret be-Siddur Ḳeri'at ha-Ḥokmot, Al-Farabi's treatise on the method of studying philosophy.
- Destructio Destructionis, a Latin translation from the Arabic of The Incoherence of the Incoherence written by Averroes against al-Ghazali.

Kalonymus's original works are as follows:

- An answer in Hebrew addressed to Joseph Caspi, in opposition to the latter's Ḳundreṣim (Quinterniones). The answer refers chiefly to Caspi's work on the Bible, entitled Ṭirat Kesef, or Sefer ha-Sod. After having paid homage to the talent and learning of Caspi, Kalonymus criticizes the book, in which Kalonymus claims to have detected many errors. Kalonymus states that in any case, even if the work were perfect, it ought not to have been published, on account of its disrespectful treatment of Biblical personages. The answer was published by Joseph Perles under the title Kalonymos ben Kalonymos Sendschreiben an Joseph Caspi (Munich, 1879).
- Sefer Melakim, a treatise on arithmetic, geometry, and astrology, of which only a fragment has been discovered by Steinschneider (Munich MS. No. 290). This treatise was composed at the request of a "great king," whom Steinschneider believes to have been Robert of Anjou.
- Even Boḥan, an ethical treatise composed in the year 1322. The treatise is written in cadenced prose, imitating, though with less elegance, the style of Jedaiah Bedersi's Beḥinat 'Olam. The author intended in the Even Boḥan to show the perversities of their contemporaries, as well as their own, passing in review all the social positions of which men are proud and arguing that these are vanity, at the end enumerating the sufferings of Israel and expressing the hope that God will have pity on their people who, in the three years (1319–22) during which time the Even Boḥan was written, had suffered persecution at the hands of the shepherds and the leprous, besides an auto-da-fé of the Talmud at Toulouse. The book also contains a poem expressing Kalonymus's lament at being born a man and desire to be a woman. The Even Boḥan was first published at Naples in 1489, and passed through many editions. It was twice translated into German, first by Moses Eisenstadt, or, according to Joseph Zedner, by Katzenellenbogen (Sulzbach, 1705), and then in cadenced prose by W. Meisel (Budapest, 1878).
- Masekhet Purim ("Tractate of Purim"), a Purim Torah, a parody intended to be read during Purim, written at Rome. Caricaturing the rabbinical style of argument, the author humorously criticizes everyone, not excluding themself. This kind of parody found many imitators. The Masseket Purim was first published at Pesaro (1507–20).

A large number of other works have been wrongly attributed to Kalonymus ben Kalonymus.

== Transgender legacy ==
In the satirical poem Even Boḥan, Kalonymus expresses lament at and curses having been born a boy, referring to their penis as a מוּם mum or 'defect'. Kalonymus wishes to have been created a woman. This poem has been increasingly embraced by some in the LGBTQIA+ Jewish community as an expression of gender dysphoria and transgender identity, suggesting that the poet may have been a trans woman. Judaism traditionally recognizes a number of gender or (inter)sex categories besides man and woman (although those genders are defined in terms of physical sexual characteristics, not self-perception), and it is impossible to know the gender identity of this person who lived in the 14th century for certain. Some scholars view Kalonymus ben Kalonymus as a possible example of a transgender person in Jewish history.

== Bibliography ==
- This article incorporates text from a publication now in the public domain: Singer, Isidore; et al., eds. (1901–1906). "KALONYMUS BEN KALONYMUS BEN MEÏR". The Jewish Encyclopedia. New York: Funk & Wagnalls.
- Leopold Zunz, G. S. iii. 150–155.
- Kayserling, Leben Kalonymus ben Kalonymus, prefixed to Meisel's German transl. of the Eben Boḥan.
- Gross, in Monatsschrift, 1879, pp. 470 et seq.
  - idem, Gallia Judaica, p. 84.
- Moritz Steinschneider, in Ersch and Gruber, Encyc. section ii., part 28, pp. 169–175.
- Heinrich Graetz, Gesch. vii. 288.
- Ernest Renan-Neubauer, Les Ecrivains Juifs Français, pp. 71 et seq.
