= Lord of Misrule =

European court figure appointed to preside over the Feast of Fools

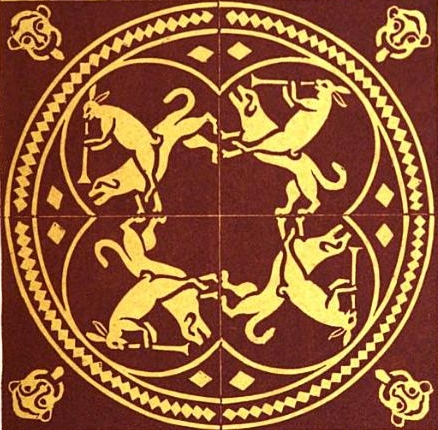
In the spirit of misrule, identified by the grinning masks in the corners, medieval floor tiles from the Derby Black Friary show a triumphant hunting hare mounted on a dog.

In England, the Lord of Misrule – known in Scotland as the Abbot of Unreason and in France as the Prince des Sots – was an officer appointed by lot during Christmastide to preside over the Feast of Fools. The Lord of Misrule was generally a peasant or sub-deacon appointed to be in charge of Christmas revelries, which often included drunkenness and wild partying.

The Catholic Church in England held a similar festival involving a boy bishop. This custom was abolished by Henry VIII in 1541, restored by the Catholic Mary I and again abolished by Protestant Elizabeth I, though here and there it lingered on for some time longer. In continental Europe, it was suppressed by the Council of Basel in 1431, but was revived in some places from time to time, even as late as the eighteenth century. In the Tudor period, the Lord of Misrule (sometimes called the Abbot of Misrule or the King of Misrule) is mentioned a number of times by contemporary documents referring to revels both at court and among the ordinary people.

While mostly known as a British holiday custom, some folklorists, such as James Frazer and Mikhail Bakhtin (who is said to have borrowed the novel idea from Frazer), have claimed that the appointment of a Lord of Misrule comes from a similar custom practised during the Roman celebration of Saturnalia. In ancient Rome, from 17 to 23 December (in the Julian calendar), a man chosen to be a mock king was appointed for the feast of Saturnalia, in the guise of the Roman deity Saturn. This hypothesis has been heavily criticized by William Warde Fowler and as such, the Christmas custom of the Lord of Misrule during the Christian era and the Saturnalian custom of antiquity may have completely separate origins; the two separate customs, however, can be compared and contrasted. Many of the customs regarding the Lord of Misrule have been incorporated into modern-day Carnival and Mardi Gras celebrations.

== History ==
=== Ancient Rome ===
On 1 January, 400 CE, the bishop Asterius of Amasea in Pontus (modern Amasya, Turkey) preached a sermon against the Feast of Calends ("this foolish and harmful delight") that describes the role of the mock king in Late Antiquity. The New Year's festival included children arriving at each doorstep, exchanging their gifts for reward:

This festival teaches even the little children, artless and simple, to be greedy, and accustoms them to go from house to house and to offer novel gifts, fruits covered with silver tinsel. For these they receive, in return, gifts double their value, and thus the tender minds of the young begin to be impressed with that which is commercial and sordid.

— Asterius, in "Oratio 4: Adversus Kalendarum Festum"

It contrasted with the Christian celebration held, not by chance, on the adjoining day:

We celebrate the birth of Christ, since at this time God manifested himself in the flesh. We celebrate the Feast of Lights (Epiphany), since by the forgiveness of our sins we are led forth from the dark prison of our former life into a life of light and uprightness.

— Asterius, "Oratio 4"

Significantly, for Asterius the Christian feast was explicitly an entry from darkness into light, and although no conscious solar nature could have been expressed, it is certainly the renewed light at midwinter that was celebrated among Roman pagans, officially from the time of Aurelian, as the "festival of the birth of the Unconquered Sun". Meanwhile, throughout the city of Amasea, although entry into the temples and holy places had been forbidden by the decree of Theodosius I (391), the festival of gift-giving when "all is noise and tumult" in "a rejoicing over the new year" with a kiss and the gift of a coin, went on all around, to the intense disgust and scorn of the bishop:

This is misnamed a feast, being full of annoyance; since going out-of-doors is burdensome, and staying within doors is not undisturbed. For the common vagrants and the jugglers of the stage, dividing themselves into squads and hordes, hang about every house. The gates of public officials they besiege with especial persistence, actually shouting and clapping their hands until he that is beleaguered within, exhausted, throws out to them whatever money he has and even what is not his own. And these mendicants going from door to door follow one after another, and, until late in the evening, there is no relief from this nuisance. For crowd succeeds crowd, and shout, shout, and loss, loss.

— Asterius, "Oratio 4"

Honest farmers coming into the city were likely to be jeered at, spanked and robbed. Worse,

"Even our most excellent and guileless prophets, the unmistakable representatives of God, who when unhindered in their work are our faithful ministers, are treated with insolence." For the soldiers, they spend all their wages in riot and loose women, see plays perhaps, "for they learn vulgarity and the practices of actors". Their military discipline is relaxed and slackened. They make sport of the laws and the government of which they have been appointed guardians. For they ridicule and insult the august government. They mount a chariot as though upon a stage; they appoint pretended lictors and publicly act like buffoons. This is the nobler part of their ribaldry. But their other doings, how can one mention them? Does not the champion, the lion-hearted man, the man who when armed is the admiration of his friends and the terror of his foes, loose his tunic to his ankles, twine a girdle about his breast, use a woman's sandal, put a roll of hair on his head in feminine fashion, and ply the distaff full of wool, and with that right hand which once bore the trophy, draw out the thread, and changing the tone of his voice utter his words in the sharper feminine treble?

In The Golden Bough, James Frazer cites a Greek martyrology which claims that during Saturnalia in Durostorum on the Danube (modern Silistra), Roman soldiers would choose a man from among themselves to be a ceremonial "temporary king" for thirty days. At the end of that term, this soldier was to cut his own throat on the altar of Saturn. The Christian Saint Dasius was supposedly chosen for this ritual, but refused to participate, and was martyred as a result. Frazer speculated that a similar ritual of human sacrifice could be the origin of the British Lord of Misrule.

=== Tudor England ===
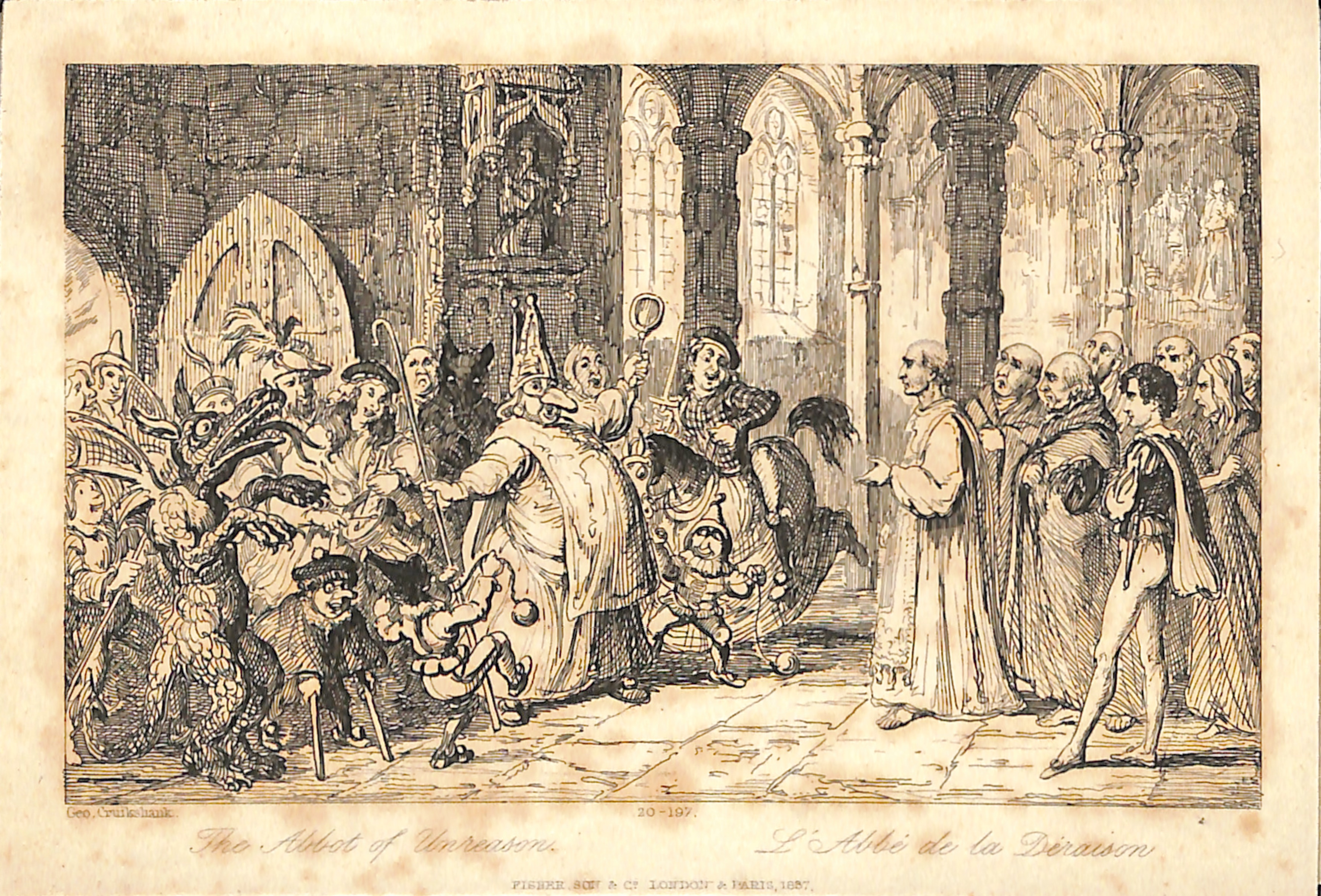
The Abbot of Unreasons by Cruikshank

In the Tudor period, John Stow in his Survey of London, published in 1603, gives a description of the Lord of Misrule:

[I]n the feaste of Christmas, there was in the kinges house, wheresoeuer hee was lodged, a Lord of Misrule, or Maister of merry disports, and the like had yee in the house of euery noble man, of honor, or good worshippe, were he spirituall or temporall. Amongst the which the Mayor of London, and eyther of the shiriffes had their seuerall Lordes of Misrule, euer contending without quarrell or offence, who should make the rarest pastimes to delight the Beholders. These Lordes beginning their rule on Alhollon Eue [Halloween], continued the same till the morrow after the Feast of the Purification, commonlie called Candlemas day: In all which space there were fine and subtle disguisinges, Maskes and Mummeries, with playing at Cardes for Counters, Nayles and pointes in euery house, more for pastimes then for gaine.

The Lord of Misrule is also mentioned by Philip Stubbes in his Anatomie of Abuses (1585), where he states that "the wilde heades of the parishe conventynge together, chuse them a grand Capitaine (of mischeefe) whom they ennobel with the title Lorde of Misrule." He then describes how they dress colourfully, tie bells onto their legs, and "go to the churche (though the minister be at praier or preachyng) dauncying and swingyng their handercheefes."

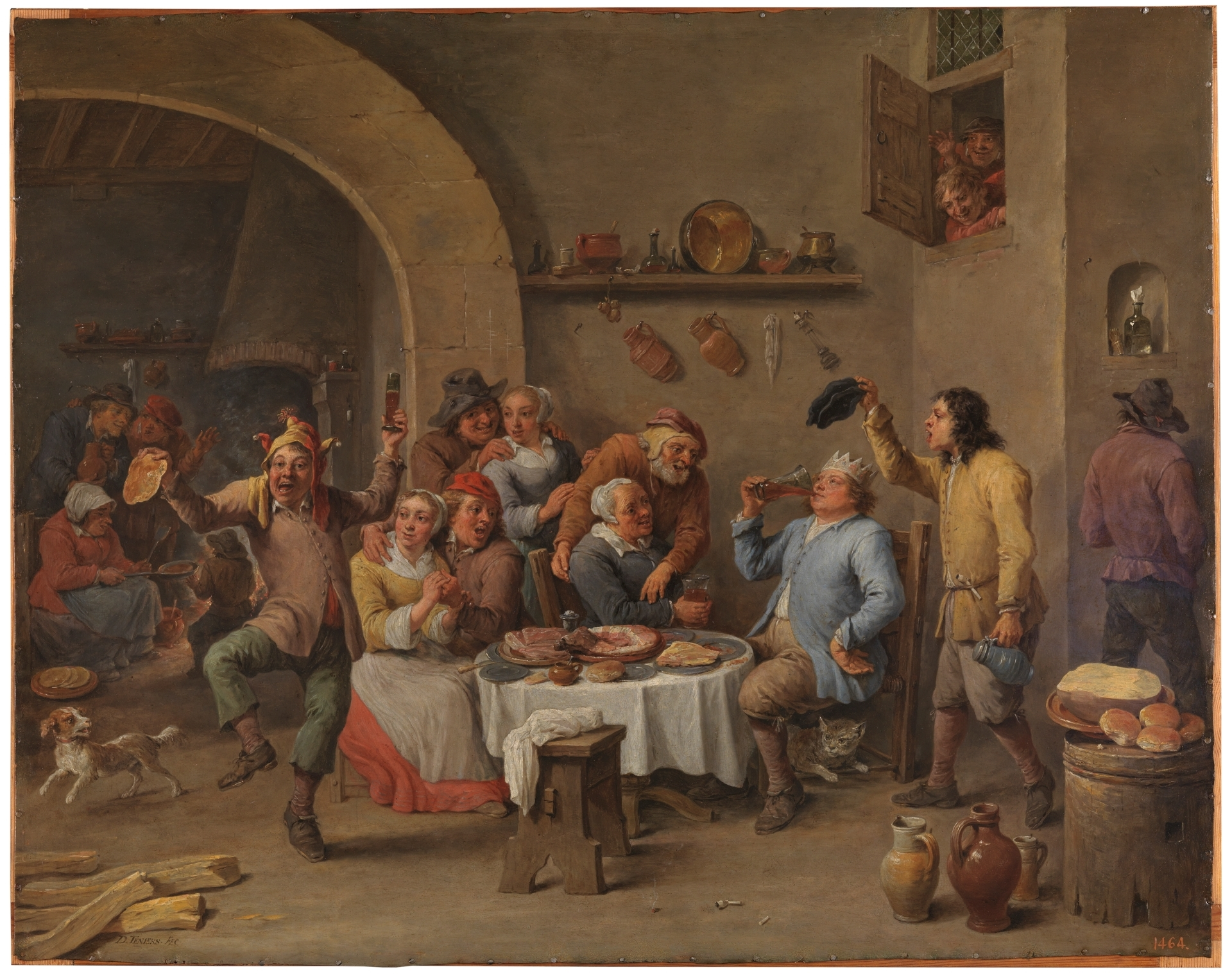
The King Drinks (between 1634 and 1640) by David Teniers the Younger, showing a Twelfth Night celebration with a Lord of Misrule

In 1570, Archbishop Grindal of York sought to restrict the activities of the Lords of Misrule and "summer lords and ladies" with an injunction against behaviour that might disrupt church services, by forbidding:

anye lordes of misrule or sommerr Lordes or ladyes or anye disguised persons or others in Christmasse or at May games ... to come unreverentlye into anye churche or chapell or churchyard and there daunce or playe anye unseemelye partes ... in the tyme of divine service or of anye sermon.

== Decline of the custom in Britain ==
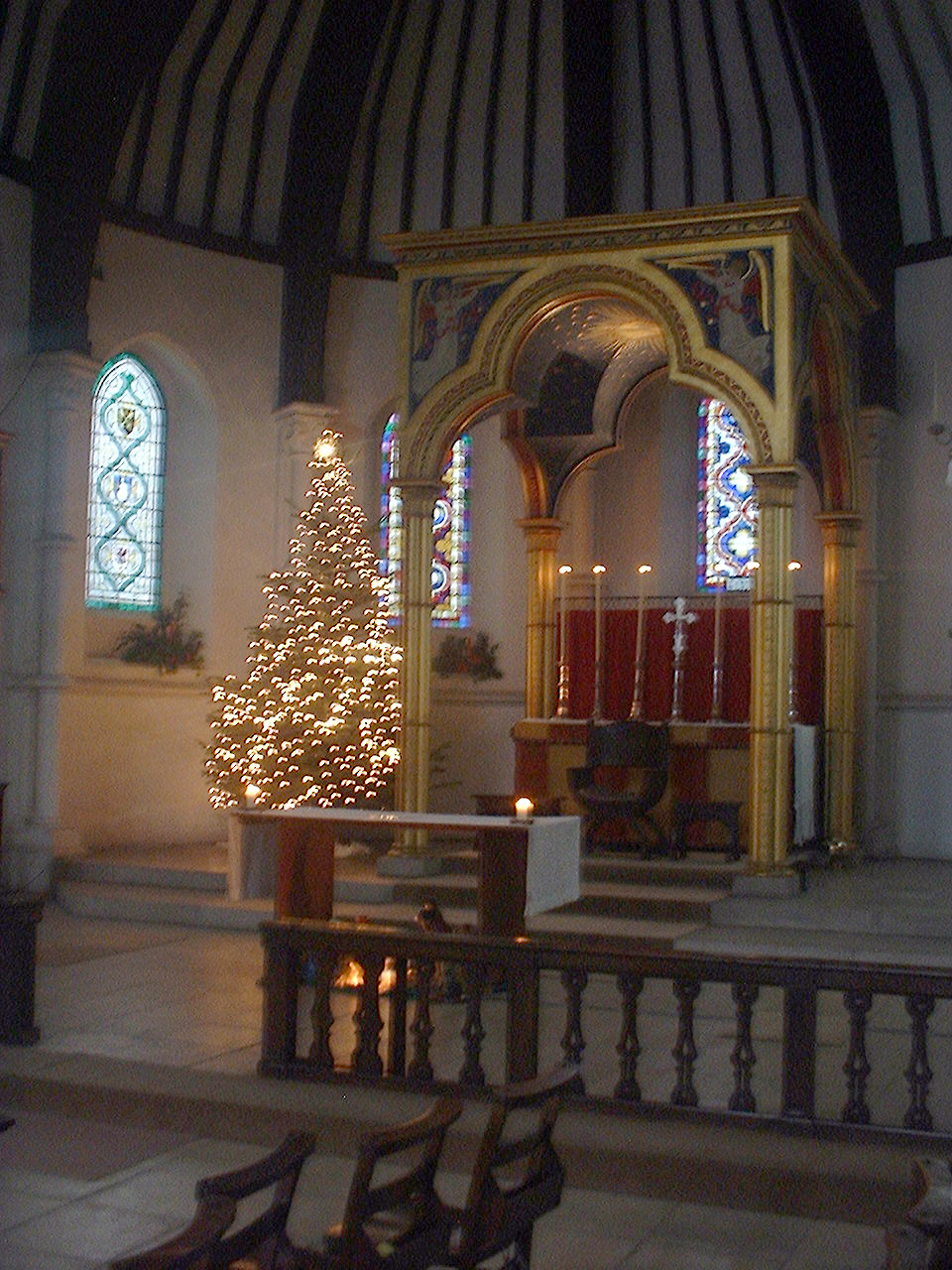
The Oxford Movement and writings by authors such as Charles Dickens brought the religious and family oriented aspects of Christmastide to the forefront of the celebration, cementing popular traditions that are maintained to this day.

With the rise of the Puritan party in the 17th century Church of England, the custom of the Lord of Misrule was outlawed as it was deemed "disruptive"; even after the Restoration, the custom remained banned and soon became forgotten. In the early 19th century, the Oxford Movement in the Anglican Church ushered in "the development of richer and more symbolic forms of worship, the building of neo-Gothic churches, and the revival and increasing centrality of the keeping of Christmas itself as a Christian festival" as well as "special charities for the poor" in addition to "special services and musical events". Charles Dickens and other writers helped in this revival of the holiday by "changing consciousness of Christmas and the way in which it was celebrated" as they emphasized family, religion, gift-giving, and social reconciliation as opposed to the historic revelry common in some places.

== See also ==
- Bracebridge Dinner
- Nine Lessons and Carols
- Carnival
- Purim rabbi, Mock rabbi during Purim, similar Jewish tradition
